= Paweł Szwajdych =

Polish footballer

Personal information
- Full name: Paweł Szwajdych
- Date of birth: 5 July 1983 (age 43)
- Place of birth: Kraków, Poland
- Height: 1.86 m (6 ft 1 in)
- Position: Midfielder

Senior career*
| Years | Team | Apps | (Gls) |
| 2001–2009 | Cracovia | | |
| 2004 | → ŁKS Łódź (loan) | 28 | (1) |
| 2005–2006 | → Kmita Zabierzów (loan) | | |
| 2008 | → Kmita Zabierzów (loan) | 13 | (0) |
| 2009 | → Stal Stalowa Wola (loan) | 12 | (0) |
| 2009–2010 | Kmita Zabierzów | 23 | (6) |
| 2010–2011 | Puszcza Niepołomice | 29 | (2) |
| 2011–2012 | LKS Mogilany | | |
| 2012 | Dalin Myślenice | 23 | (9) |
| 2013–2018 | Wiślanie Jaśkowice | | |
- * Club domestic league appearances and goals

Paweł Szwajdych (born 5 July 1983) is a Polish former professional footballer who played as a midfielder.

== Honours ==
Wiślanie Jaśkowice

- IV liga Lesser Poland West: 2016–17
