= D'sean Theobalds =

English footballer (born 1995)

Personal information
- Date of birth: 21 October 1995 (age 31)
- Place of birth: London, England
- Height: 1.79 m (5 ft 10 in)
- Position: Midfielder

Team information
- Current team: Concord Rangers

Youth career
- West Ham United
- Barnet

Senior career*
Years	Team	Apps	(Gls)
2012–2013	Redbridge	6	(1)
2016	Barkingside	2	(0)
2016–2018	Leatherhead	63	(5)
2018	Concord Rangers	8	(1)
2018	Leatherhead	14	(2)
2018–2020	Tonbridge Angels	44	(5)
2020	Korona Kielce	2	(0)
2020	Korona Kielce II	1	(0)
2020–2021	Tonbridge Angels	14	(0)
2021	Unia Tarnów	8	(2)
2021–2022	Dartford	4	(0)
2022	Welling United	2	(0)
2022	Kingstonian	6	(0)
2022–	Concord Rangers	16	(1)
- * Club domestic league appearances and goals as of 17:10, 19 May 2023 (UTC)

D'sean Theobalds (born 21 October 1995) is an English professional footballer who plays as a midfielder for Concord Rangers.

== Career ==
Theobalds joined Tonbridge Angels from Leatherhead in December 2018, having previously played for Redbridge and Barkingside. He went on to make 44 league appearances for the club, helping them achieve promotion to National League South in his first season. On 6 February, he joined Ekstraklasa side Korona Kielce on a three-and-a-half-year deal. On 16 February 2020, he made his professional debut, starting and playing 62 minutes in the 0–0 draw with Jagiellonia Białystok.

On 5 August 2020, Theobalds left Korona Kielce by mutual consent after making two appearances for the club. A month later he returned to his previous club, Tonbridge Angels.

On 18 March 2021, Theobalds returned to Poland to join fourth-tier side, Unia Tarnów.

After six first-team appearances for Dartford in all competitions, Theobalds joined Welling United until the end of the 2021-22 season. On 18 March 2022, Welling United announced that Theobalds had left the club along with four other players.

On 23 March 2022, Theobalds signed for Isthmian League Premier Division side Kingstonian.

== Career statistics ==
As of match played 26 November 2022

Appearances and goals by club, season and competition
Club	Season	League			National cup (Note: Includes FA Cup)		League cup		Other		Total	
Club	Season	Division	Apps	Goals	Apps	Goals	Apps	Goals	Apps	Goals	Apps	Goals
Redbridge	2012–13	Isthmian League Division One North	6	1	0	0	—		0	0	6	1
Barkingside	2016–17	Essex Senior League	2	0	0	0	—		0	0	2	0
Leatherhead	2016–17	Isthmian League Premier Division	26	4	—		—		—		26	4
Leatherhead	2017–18	Isthmian League Premier Division	37	1	6	0	—		1 (Note: Appearance in the Alan Turvey Trophy)	0	44	1
Leatherhead	Total		63	5	6	0	—		1	0	70	5
Concord Rangers	2018–19	National League South	8	1	—		—		—		8	1
Leatherhead	2018–19	Isthmian League Premier Division	14	2	6	0	—		2 (Note: One appearance in the Alan Turvey Trophy, one in the FA Trophy)	0	22	2
Tonbridge Angels	2018–19	Isthmian League Premier Division	22	0	—		—		3 (Note: Appearances in the Isthmian League Premier Division play-offs)	0	25	0
Tonbridge Angels	2019–20	National League South	22	5	1	1	—		3 (Note: Appearances in the FA Trophy)	1	26	7
Tonbridge Angels	Total		44	5	1	1	—		6	1	51	7
Korona Kielce	2019–20	Ekstraklasa	2	0	—		—		—		2	0
Korona Kielce II	2019–20	III liga, group IV	1	0	—		—		—		1	0
Tonbridge Angels	2020–21	National League South	14	0	3	0	—		0	0	17	0
Unia Tarnów	2020–21	IV liga Lesser Poland (East)	8	2	—		—		—		8	2
Dartford	2021–22	National League South	4	0	0	0	—		2 (Note: One appearance in the London Senior Cup) (Note: One appearance in the Kent Senior Cup)	1	6	1
Welling United	2021–22	National League South	2	0	—		—		—		2	0
Kingstonian	2021–22	Isthmian League Premier Division	6	0	—		—		1 (Note: One appearance in the Surrey Senior Cup)	0	7	0
Concord Rangers	2022–23	National League South	16	1	0	0	—		1	0	17	1
Career total			190	17	16	1	0	0	13	2	219	20

== Honours ==
Tonbridge Angels

- Ryman Premier League Super Play-off final winners: 2018–19

Unia Tarnów

- IV liga Lesser Poland (East): 2020–21
