= Liga Okręgowa (group: Kraków II) =

Liga Okręgowa (group: Kraków II) or Klasa Okręgowa (group: Kraków II) is one of the groups in the Liga Okręgowa regional league in Lesser Poland Voivodeship, which represents the sixth level of the Polish football hierarchy.

The winners of the group are promoted to the IV liga Lesser Poland, while the weakest teams are relegated to Klasa A.

The introduction of Kraków II along with Kraków I groups were introduced in the 2011/12 season, with further extension to Kraków III from 2013/14 season onwards. Before that, there was one Kraków group in the Liga Okręgowa.

The tournament is organized by the Lesser Poland Football Association (Polish: Małopolski Związek Piłki Nożnej, MZPN).

== Season 2020/21 ==
The 2020/21 season kicked off with 15 teams instead of the usual 14. Skawinka Skawina was relegated to the group from IV liga. Orlęta Rudawa and Zwierzyniecki KS Kraków were promoted from their respective Klasa A groups (Kraków II and Kraków III). Prądniczanka Kraków and Grębałowianka Kraków competed in the Kraków I in the previous season and transferred to Kraków II group for this season. TS Węgrzce and Błękitni Modlnica, that competed in this group in the season before, transferred to Kraków I. Wiślanie II Jaśkowice, that finished eleventh the 2019/20 season, did not enroll for this season's competition.

The team finishing on the top of the table will win promotion to the IV liga, while the teams finishing in the bottom three (13,14,15) will be relegated to Klasa A.

=== League table ===
Pos	Team	Pld	W	D	L	GF	GA	GD	Pts	Promotion
1	Wieczysta Kraków	14	14	0	0	114	6	+108	42	Promotion to IV liga Lesser Poland
2	Prądniczanka Kraków	14	11	2	1	64	23	+41	35	
3	Prokocim Kraków	14	11	0	3	34	13	+21	33	
4	Kmita Zabierzów	14	9	2	3	30	11	+19	29	
5	Skawinka Skawina	14	9	0	5	44	39	+5	27	
6	Hutnik II Kraków	14	7	2	5	46	36	+10	23	
7	KS Borek (Kraków)	14	6	0	8	32	49	−17	18	
8	Kaszowianka Kaszów	14	4	3	7	28	36	−8	15	
9	Grębałowianka Kraków	14	5	0	9	25	56	−31	15	
10	Orlęta Rudawa	14	4	3	7	30	58	−28	15	
11	Nadwiślan Kraków	14	4	2	8	21	36	−15	14	
12	Dąbski KS Kraków	14	4	1	9	28	60	−32	13	
13	Piast Wołowice	14	3	3	8	20	42	−22	12	Relegation to Klasa A
14	Zwierzyniecki KS Kraków	14	2	3	9	15	34	−19	9	Relegation to Klasa A
15	Bronowianka Kraków	14	1	1	12	18	50	−32	4	Relegation to Klasa A

Updated to match(es) played on 3 March 2021. Source:
Rules for classification: 1. Number of points reached in the entire series of games; 2. Number of points reached in direct matches; 3. Goal difference in direct matches; 4. Goal difference in direct matches – away goals counted twice; 5. Goal difference in the whole series of games; 6. Number of goals scored in the entire series of games.

== Season 2019/20 ==
Due to the COVID-19 pandemic, the season did not restart after the winter break in March. Garbarnia II Kraków was promoted to IV liga, but none of the teams was relegated.

=== League table ===
Pos	Team	Pld	W	D	L	GF	GA	GD	Pts	Promotion
1	Garbarnia II Kraków	13	12	0	1	40	12	+28	36	Promotion to IV liga Lesser Poland
2	Wieczysta Kraków	13	11	2	0	64	7	+57	35	
3	Hutnik II Kraków	13	8	1	4	40	16	+24	25	
4	Prokocim Kraków	13	7	3	3	25	19	+6	24	
5	TS Węgrzce	13	6	3	4	26	17	+9	21	
6	Kaszowianka Kaszów	13	5	6	2	26	18	+8	21	
7	Bronowianka Kraków	13	6	1	6	21	29	−8	19	
8	Błękitni Modlnica	13	5	3	5	29	24	+5	18	
9	Piast Wołowice	13	5	1	7	28	32	−4	16	
10	Kmita Zabierzów	13	4	3	6	18	39	−21	15	
11	Wiślanie II Jaśkowice	13	4	2	7	22	32	−10	14	
12	KS Borek (Kraków)	13	2	1	10	15	34	−19	7	
13	Dąbski KS Kraków	13	1	3	9	16	44	−28	6	
14	Nadwiślan Kraków	13	0	1	12	8	55	−47	1	

Updated to match(es) played on 27 September 2020. Source:
Rules for classification: 1. Number of points reached in the entire series of games; 2. Number of points reached in direct matches; 3. Goal difference in direct matches; 4. Goal difference in direct matches – away goals counted twice; 5. Goal difference in the whole series of games; 6. Number of goals scored in the entire series of games.

== Season 2018/19 ==
=== League table ===
Pos	Team	Pld	W	D	L	GF	GA	GD	Pts	Promotion
1	Skawinka Skawina	26	20	4	2	78	33	+45	64	Promotion to IV liga Lesser Poland
2	Wieczysta Kraków	26	18	4	4	83	39	+44	58	
3	TS Węgrzce	26	15	5	6	63	42	+21	50	
4	Garbarnia II Kraków	26	15	3	8	90	43	+47	48	
5	Błękitni Modlnica	26	12	7	7	77	45	+32	43	
6	KS Borek (Kraków)	26	12	4	10	49	51	−2	40	
7	Bronowianka Kraków	26	10	6	10	50	54	−4	36	
8	Wiślanie II Jaśkowice	26	11	3	12	40	68	−28	36	
9	Hutnik II Kraków	26	11	2	13	69	67	+2	35	
10	Piast Wołowice	26	8	4	14	34	60	−26	28	
11	Nadwiślan Kraków	26	8	2	16	41	78	−37	26	
12	Prokocim Kraków	26	5	10	11	43	52	−9	25	
13	Świt Krzeszowice	26	7	3	16	52	75	−23	24	Relegation to Klasa A
14	Iskra Radwanowice	26	1	1	24	16	78	−62	4	Relegation to Klasa A

Updated to match(es) played on 16 June 2019. Source:
Rules for classification: 1. Number of points reached in the entire series of games; 2. Number of points reached in direct matches; 3. Goal difference in direct matches; 4. Goal difference in direct matches – away goals counted twice; 5. Goal difference in the whole series of games; 6. Number of goals scored in the entire series of games.

== Season 2017/18 ==
=== League table ===
Pos	Team	Pld	W	D	L	GF	GA	GD	Pts	Promotion
1	Kaszowianka Kaszów	26	19	5	2	74	34	+40	62	Promotion to IV liga Lesser Poland
2	Błękitni Modlnica	26	17	2	7	79	52	+27	53	
3	Bronowianka Kraków	26	16	4	6	58	23	+35	52	
4	Prokocim Kraków	26	14	5	7	50	34	+16	47	
5	Garbarnia II Kraków	26	14	4	8	68	34	+34	46	
6	Świt Krzeszowice	26	14	2	10	60	50	+10	44	
7	Skawinka Skawina	26	9	7	10	34	43	−9	34	
8	Iskra Radwanowice	26	8	7	11	44	45	−1	31	
9	Piast Wołowice	26	9	2	15	38	54	−16	29	
10	KS Borek (Kraków)	26	8	4	14	35	51	−16	28	
11	Wieczysta Kraków	26	7	5	14	39	58	−19	26	
12	Nadwiślan Kraków	26	7	4	15	44	81	−37	25	
13	Kmita Zabierzów	26	5	5	16	32	64	−32	20	Relegation to Klasa A
14	Wisła Jeziorzany	26	4	6	16	24	56	−32	18	Relegation to Klasa A

Updated to match(es) played on 10 June 2018. Source:
Rules for classification: 1. Number of points reached in the entire series of games; 2. Number of points reached in direct matches; 3. Goal difference in direct matches; 4. Goal difference in direct matches – away goals counted twice; 5. Goal difference in the whole series of games; 6. Number of goals scored in the entire series of games.

== Season 2016/17 ==
=== League table ===
Pos	Team	Pld	W	D	L	GF	GA	GD	Pts	Promotion
1	Clepardia Kraków	26	18	3	5	76	36	+40	57	Promotion to IV liga Lesser Poland
2	Prokocim Kraków	26	17	2	7	55	26	+29	53	
3	Kaszowianka Kaszów	26	16	4	6	61	37	+24	52	
4	Nadwiślan Kraków	26	13	6	7	57	47	+10	45	
5	Bronowianka Kraków	26	13	5	8	51	38	+13	44	
6	Garbarnia II Kraków	26	12	7	7	58	48	+10	43	
7	Iskra Radwanowice	26	10	4	12	44	53	−9	34	
8	Kmita Zabierzów	26	9	5	12	43	53	−10	32	
9	Wisła Jeziorzany	26	8	7	11	31	42	−11	31	
10	KS Borek (Kraków)	26	9	3	14	30	38	−8	30	
11	Świt Krzeszowice	26	7	5	14	46	53	−7	26	
12	Piast Wołowice	26	7	5	14	33	51	−18	26	
13	Tęcza Piekary	26	5	6	15	30	68	−38	21	Relegation to Klasa A
14	Podgórze Kraków	26	6	2	18	36	61	−25	20	Relegation to Klasa A

Updated to match(es) played on 18 June 2017. Source:
Rules for classification: 1. Number of points reached in the entire series of games; 2. Number of points reached in direct matches; 3. Goal difference in direct matches; 4. Goal difference in direct matches – away goals counted twice; 5. Goal difference in the whole series of games; 6. Number of goals scored in the entire series of games.

== Season 2015/16 ==
=== League table ===
Pos	Team	Pld	W	D	L	GF	GA	GD	Pts	Promotion
1	Dalin Myślenice	26	19	5	2	86	25	+61	62	Promotion to IV liga Lesser Poland
2	Kaszowianka Kaszów	26	18	6	2	65	19	+46	60	
3	Kmita Zabierzów	26	13	8	5	47	36	+11	47	
4	Nadwiślan Kraków	26	13	3	10	58	46	+12	42	
5	Prokocim Kraków	26	12	5	9	52	54	−2	41	
6	Garbarnia II Kraków	26	11	6	9	67	41	+26	39	
7	KS Borek (Kraków)	26	10	6	10	27	35	−8	36	
8	Clepardia Kraków	26	9	7	10	56	42	+14	34	
9	Piast Wołowice	26	8	9	9	40	47	−7	33	
10	Tęcza Piekary	26	7	5	14	37	61	−24	26	
11	Podgórze Kraków	26	7	5	14	42	57	−15	26	
12	Świt Krzeszowice	26	6	7	13	44	76	−32	25	
13	Zjednoczeni Branice (Kraków)	26	4	5	17	27	69	−42	17	Relegation to Klasa A
14	Lotnik Kryspinów	26	4	5	17	26	66	−40	17	Relegation to Klasa A

Updated to match(es) played on 18 June 2016. Source:
Rules for classification: 1. Number of points reached in the entire series of games; 2. Number of points reached in direct matches; 3. Goal difference in direct matches; 4. Goal difference in direct matches – away goals counted twice; 5. Goal difference in the whole series of games; 6. Number of goals scored in the entire series of games.

== Season 2014/15 ==
=== League table ===
Pos	Team	Pld	W	D	L	GF	GA	GD	Pts	Promotion
1	Skawinka Skawina	24	17	5	2	53	24	+29	56	Promotion to IV liga Lesser Poland
2	Kaszowianka Kaszów	24	16	3	5	72	30	+42	51	
3	Sokół Kocmyrzów Baranówka	24	14	5	5	64	36	+28	47	
4	Prokocim Kraków	24	11	6	7	30	31	−1	39	
5	Piast Wołowice	24	11	5	8	51	40	+11	38	
6	Podgórze Kraków	24	9	7	8	46	40	+6	34	
7	Garbarnia II Kraków	24	10	4	10	52	41	+11	34	
8	Kmita Zabierzów	24	8	6	10	29	33	−4	30	
9	Zjednoczeni Branice (Kraków)	24	9	3	12	31	47	−16	30	
10	KS Borek (Kraków)	24	8	6	10	39	39	0	30	
11	Lotnik Kryspinów	24	5	4	15	19	43	−24	19	
12	Liszczanka Liszki	24	5	3	16	30	60	−30	18	Relegation to Klasa A
13	Pozowianka Pozowice	24	3	3	18	18	70	−52	12	Relegation to Klasa A

Updated to match(es) played on 20 June 2015. Source:
Rules for classification: 1. Number of points reached in the entire series of games; 2. Number of points reached in direct matches; 3. Goal difference in direct matches; 4. Goal difference in direct matches – away goals counted twice; 5. Goal difference in the whole series of games; 6. Number of goals scored in the entire series of games.

== Season 2013/14 ==
=== League table ===
Pos	Team	Pld	W	D	L	GF	GA	GD	Pts	Promotion
1	Proszowianka Proszowice	22	18	2	2	95	15	+80	56	Promotion to IV liga Lesser Poland
2	Kaszowianka Kaszów	22	12	7	3	44	14	+30	43	
3	Skawinka Skawina	22	12	5	5	49	27	+22	41	
4	Prokocim Kraków	22	11	6	5	54	34	+20	39	
5	Podgórze Kraków	22	11	5	6	53	35	+18	38	
6	Kmita Zabierzów	22	9	6	7	46	32	+14	33	
7	Garbarnia II Kraków	22	9	5	8	58	34	+24	32	
8	Piast Wołowice	22	7	2	13	40	49	−9	23	
9	Pogoń Skotniki (Kraków)	22	5	6	11	20	51	−31	21	
10	Lotnik Kryspinów	22	5	2	15	18	65	−47	17	
11	Pozowianka Pozowice	22	4	3	15	17	92	−75	15	
12	Tramwaj Kraków	22	2	5	15	17	63	−46	11	Supplementary play-offs for participation in the Liga Okręgowa in Kraków for next season.

Updated to match(es) played on 14 June 2014. Source:
Rules for classification: 1. Number of points reached in the entire series of games; 2. Number of points reached in direct matches; 3. Goal difference in direct matches; 4. Goal difference in direct matches – away goals counted twice; 5. Goal difference in the whole series of games; 6. Number of goals scored in the entire series of games.

=== Supplementary play-offs ===
A one match play-off was held between the last team of Kraków II Tramwaj Kraków and the last team of Kraków III Zjednoczeni Branice (Kraków). The winner of the play-offs would stay i the Liga Okręgowa, whiles the looser would get relegated to Klasa A

6 August 2014
17:30 CET (UTC+1)

Tramwaj Kraków	1–5	Zjednoczeni Branice
Kacper Makówka 50' (pen.)	Report	Paweł Brak 12', 32' (pen.), 83' (pen.), 85' (pen.); Paweł Zegarek 62'

Bronowianka Kraków Stadion, Kraków

== Season 2012/13 ==
Due to the extension of the Liga Okręgowa, Pozowianka Pozowice, Pogoń Skotniki (Kraków) and Tramwaj Kraków did not get relegated at the end of season.

=== League table ===
Pos	Team	Pld	W	D	L	GF	GA	GD	Pts	Promotion
1	Wiślanie Jaśkowice	32	22	5	5	81	35	+46	71	Promotion to IV liga Lesser Poland
2	Zjednoczeni Branice (Kraków)	32	21	4	7	74	42	+32	67	
3	Raba Dobczyce	32	15	13	4	71	50	+21	58	
4	Wiślanka Grabie	32	17	6	9	75	41	+34	57	
5	Hejnał Krzyszkowice	32	17	6	9	85	56	+29	57	
6	Jordan Sum Zakliczyn	32	13	8	11	56	52	+4	47	
7	Pcimianka Pcim	32	12	9	11	57	56	+1	45	
8	Gościbia Sułkowice	32	11	11	10	54	36	+18	44	
9	Skawinka Skawina	32	11	11	10	60	59	+1	44	
10	Orzeł Myślenice	32	12	8	12	50	59	−9	44	
11	Piast Wołowice	32	12	7	13	69	62	+7	43	
12	Lotnik Kryspinów	32	12	6	14	56	45	+11	42	
13	Rokita Kornatka	32	8	11	13	40	63	−23	35	
14	LKS Śledziejowice	32	7	11	14	47	64	−17	32	
15	Pozowianka Pozowice	32	6	7	19	36	81	−45	25	
16	Pogoń Skotniki (Kraków)	32	5	5	22	27	82	−55	20	
17	Tramwaj Kraków	32	4	6	22	42	97	−55	18	

Updated to match(es) played on 30 June 2013. Source:
Rules for classification: 1. Number of points reached in the entire series of games; 2. Number of points reached in direct matches; 3. Goal difference in direct matches; 4. Goal difference in direct matches – away goals counted twice; 5. Goal difference in the whole series of games; 6. Number of goals scored in the entire series of games.

== Season 2011/12 ==
=== League table ===
Pos	Team	Pld	W	D	L	GF	GA	GD	Pts	Promotion
1	Czarni Staniątki	32	22	8	2	91	31	+60	74	Promotion to IV liga Lesser Poland
2	Wiślanie Jaśkowice	32	20	6	6	84	35	+49	66	Promotion play-offs to IV liga Lesser Poland
3	Raba Dobczyce	32	18	4	10	56	44	+12	58	
4	Piast Wołowice	32	18	4	10	65	53	+12	58	
5	Wiślanka Grabie	32	17	3	12	53	53	0	54	
6	Pcimianka Pcim	32	16	4	12	64	41	+23	52	
7	LKS Śledziejowice	32	15	6	11	59	42	+17	51	
8	Hejnał Krzyszkowice	32	16	2	14	72	58	+14	50	
9	Gościbia Sułkowice	32	15	4	13	54	46	+8	49	
10	Jordan Sum Zakliczyn	32	13	7	12	47	36	+11	46	
11	Skawinka Skawina	32	13	4	15	55	62	−7	43	
12	Tramwaj Kraków	32	12	6	14	59	64	−5	42	
13	Pogoń Skotniki (Kraków)	32	12	4	16	45	51	−6	40	
14	Orzeł Myślenice	32	10	6	16	44	59	−15	36	
15	Sęp Droginia	32	9	2	21	35	69	−34	29	Relegation to Klasa A
16	Wróblowianka Wróblowice (Kraków)	32	5	4	23	28	85	−57	19	Relegation to Klasa A
17	Nadwiślanka Nowe Brzesko	32	2	4	26	26	108	−82	10	Relegation to Klasa A

Updated to match(es) played on 9 June 2012. Source:
Rules for classification: 1. Number of points reached in the entire series of games; 2. Number of points reached in direct matches; 3. Goal difference in direct matches; 4. Goal difference in direct matches – away goals counted twice; 5. Goal difference in the whole series of games; 6. Number of goals scored in the entire series of games.

=== Promotion play-offs ===
Pos	Team	Pld	W	D	L	GF	GA	GD	Pts	Promotion
1	Jutrzenka Giebułtów	2	1	1	0	5	3	+2	4	Promotion to IV liga Lesser Poland
2	Wiślanie Jaśkowice	2	1	0	1	7	7	0	3	
3	KS Chełmek	2	0	1	1	2	4	−2	1	

Updated to match(es) played on 24 June 2012. Source:
Rules for classification: 1. Number of points reached in the entire series of games; 2. Number of points reached in direct matches; 3. Goal difference in direct matches; 4. Goal difference in direct matches – away goals counted twice; 5. Goal difference in the whole series of games; 6. Number of goals scored in the entire series of games.
