= Kraków Metro =

Planned rapid transit system in Poland

Overview
- Locale: Kraków
- Transit type: Rapid transit
- Number of lines: 0 (2 planned)
- Number of stations: 0 (29 planned)
- Website: https://krakow.pl/288854,artykul,metro.html

Operation
- Operation will start: c. 2035

Technical
- System length: 0 km (28.5 km (17.7 mi) planned)

2022 Map of the planned first premetro line overlaid over the Kraków Tram network

The Kraków Metro (Polish: Metro w Krakowie) is a planned autonomous rapid transit system in the Polish city of Kraków. The projected span of the system with two lines and 29 stations was presented by the city in September 2025.

== History ==
The first plan for the construction of a Kraków Metro appeared in the 1960s, when the conference of scientists and transport specialists entitled "Metro in Krakow" was held. In 1973 work began on tunnel underneath the Krakow's main railway station. According to the initial plans, the structure was to be much longer, but at the end only a 1420-metre-long tram tunnel from the Mogilskie Roundabout to Kraków University of Technology was opened in 2008.

The idea of building the Kraków Metro came back in 2014, when the project was put to a referendum, in which 55.11% of residents voted in favour of its implementation. In 2021 a feasibility study of the project was presented, where the premetro variant from Bronowice to Nowa Huta was recommended. As of January 2024, the environmental impact assessment was being made. Due to the current plans, the construction works could start in 2029 and will last for around 4 years. In June 2024, the premetro project underwent major changes under the city's new administration.

In September 2025 a new, expanded metro project was unveiled. The city is currently looking for a contractor.

== Plan ==
The system is planned to have two lines running largely along the same track, with a total length of 28.5 km and 29 stations. Line 1 (M1) would begin in Opatkowice and Line 2 (M2) in Kurdwanów, with them meeting at Brożka station and terminating at Nowa Huta. 40% of the city's population would be within 10 minutes of a metro station on foot.

The system would use autonomous trains that would arrive every 2 minutes on the central segment and 4 minutes after the lines split.

Construction is set to cost between 13 and 15 billion zł, start in 2030 at the latest, and take around 5 years, with the opening forecast being set to 2035.
