= Maciej Palczewski =

Polish footballer (born 1982)

Personal information
- Date of birth: 1 February 1982 (age 44)
- Place of birth: Kraków, Poland
- Height: 1.95 m (6 ft 5 in)
- Position: Goalkeeper

Team information
- Current team: Cracovia (goalkeeper coaching coordinator); Poland U20 (goalkeeping coach)

Senior career*
Years	Team	Apps	(Gls)
1999–2004	Wisła Kraków II		
2000–2001	→ Cracovia (loan)		
2001	→ Wawel Kraków (loan)		
2001–2002	→ Dalin Myślenice (loan)		
2002	→ Wisłoka Dębica (loan)		
2004	Proszowianka Proszowice		
2004–2005	Szczakowianka Jaworzno	11	(0)
2005–2006	Garbarnia Kraków		
2006–2007	Arka Gdynia	0	(0)
2007–2009	Przebój Wolbrom	51	(0)
2009	Okocimski KS Brzesko	12	(0)
2009–2013	Przebój Wolbrom	108	(0)
2013–2015	LKS Śledziejowice		
2015	Tramwaj Kraków		
2015–2017	Wiślanie Jaśkowice		
2017–2021	Orzeł Piaski Wielkie	57	(0)
2021	Wiara Lecha Poznań	4	(0)
2023–2024	Orzeł Piaski Wielkie	8	(0)
- * Club domestic league appearances and goals

Maciej Palczewski (born 1 February 1982) is a Polish goalkeeping coach and former professional footballer who played as a goalkeeper.

== Career ==
As a player, having gone through Wisła Kraków's youth system, he played mostly for teams in his home region: Cracovia, Dalin Myślenice, Wisłoka Dębica, Szczakowianka Jaworzno, Proszowianka Proszowice, Okocimski Brzesko and Przebój Wolbrom, however he never played in the Ekstraklasa.

In May 2023, it was announced that Palczewski would leave Lech Poznań at the end of the season. In November that same year, it was announced by Cracovia that Palczewski would become the club's goalkeeper coaching coordinator.

== Honours ==
Wiślanie Jaśkowice

- IV liga Lesser Poland West: 2016–17
