= Mathieu Scalet =

French footballer (born 1997)

Personal information
- Date of birth: 1 April 1997 (age 29)
- Place of birth: Annemasse, France
- Height: 1.86 m (6 ft 1 in)
- Position: Midfielder

Team information
- Current team: Odra Opole
- Number: 8

Youth career
- 2002–2011: Saint-Genis-Ferney-Crozet
- 2011–2013: Meyrin
- 2013–2014: Saint-Genis-Ferney-Crozet

Senior career*
Years	Team	Apps	(Gls)
2015–2016	Wisła Kraków II	40	(6)
2016–2017	Beskid Andrychów	6	(1)
2017–2021	Śląsk Wrocław II	69	(34)
2017–2021	Śląsk Wrocław	16	(2)
2021–2023	Podbeskidzie Bielsko-Biała	36	(4)
2023–2026	Motor Lublin	72	(5)
2026–	Odra Opole	0	(0)
- * Club domestic league appearances and goals as of 21:35, 29 May 2026 (UTC)

Mathieu Scalet (born 1 April 1997) is a French professional footballer who plays as a midfielder for I liga club Odra Opole.

== Career ==
=== Youth career ===
Scalet started his career with the youth teams of French side Saint-Genis-Ferney-Crozet before moving to Poland to join Wisła Kraków and then Beskid Andrychów. He made several appearances for the Wisła Kraków second team during his spell at the club.

=== Śląsk Wrocław ===
On 26 November 2017, Scalet made his senior debut for Śląsk Wrocław as a 90th-minute substitute during their 1–0 victory over Zagłębie Lubin, coming on to provide the assist for Piotr Celeban to score the winner. He has also played several games for the Śląsk Wrocław second team in the fourth and fifth tiers of Polish football.

=== Podbeskidzie Bielsko-Biała ===
In 2021, Scalet joined I liga side Podbeskidzie Bielsko-Biała on a one-year deal after the contract with his former club ended. He made his debut for Podbeskidzie on 1 August 2021, during a 1–1 draw against Górnik Polkowice. He scored his first goal there in a 1–2 away victory over ŁKS Łódź. On 20 November 2021, in a 4–0 home victory over Górnik Polkowice, he scored a doublet.

Throughout the 2021–22 season, Scalet appeared in 28 matches, scoring four goals. On 31 May 2022, the prolongation of his contract for further two years was announced by Podbeskidzie. In the next season, he made his appearance in eight matches, but he did not score a goal.

=== Motor Lublin ===
On 23 June 2023, Scalet joined I liga side Motor Lublin on a two-year deal. A clause was added to his contract that allowed it to be prolonged by half of its original length. In Motor, he was assigned with a squad number #37. He made his debut for Motor in a 3–2 home victory over Zagłębie Sosnowiec, which took place on 21 June 2023. He scored his first goal for his new team on 8 December, during a 0–4 away victory in a rematch against Zagłębie. He was released by Motor in June 2026 after his contract had expired. In total, he made 75 appearances in all competitions for Motor, scoring five goals and recording three assists.

=== Odra Opole ===
On 18 June 2026, I liga club Odra Opole announced the signing of Scalet on a deal until June 2028, with an option for another year.

== Honours ==
Śląsk Wrocław II

- III liga, group III: 2019–20
- IV liga Lesser Poland East: 2018–19
