= Filip Piszczek =

Polish footballer (born 1995)

Personal information
- Full name: Filip Piszczek
- Date of birth: 26 May 1995 (age 31)
- Place of birth: Nowy Targ, Poland
- Height: 1.90 m (6 ft 3 in)
- Position: Forward

Team information
- Current team: Sandecja Nowy Sącz
- Number: 25

Youth career
- –2011: Lubań Tylmanowa

Senior career*
Years	Team	Apps	(Gls)
2012–2013	Lubań Tylmanowa	15	(0)
2013	Lubań Maniowy	14	(7)
2014–2018	Sandecja Nowy Sącz	78	(12)
2014	→ Poprad Muszyna (loan)	14	(2)
2018–2022	Cracovia	73	(10)
2019–2021	Cracovia II	16	(13)
2020	→ Trapani (loan)	11	(2)
2022	Jagiellonia Białystok	5	(0)
2022–2024	FC Imabari	5	(0)
2024	Bohemians	21	(2)
2025	Ischia	13	(5)
2025–	Sandecja Nowy Sącz	32	(9)
- * Club domestic league appearances and goals as of 14:28, 6 June 2026 (UTC)

Filip Piszczek (born 26 May 1995) is a Polish professional footballer who plays as a forward for II liga club Sandecja Nowy Sącz.

== Club career ==
On 31 January 2020, he joined Italian Serie B club Trapani on loan.

On 25 February 2022, he moved to Jagiellonia Białystok on a half-a-year deal with a two-year extension option.

After an unsuccessful stint in Białystok, in July 2022 he signed for Japanese third division side FC Imabari.

== Career statistics ==
As of match played 6 June 2026

Appearances and goals by club, season and competition
Club	Season	League			National cup (Note: Includes Polish Cup, FAI Cup)		Europe		Other		Total	
Club	Season	Division	Apps	Goals	Apps	Goals	Apps	Goals	Apps	Goals	Apps	Goals
Lubań Tylmanowa	2011–12	Klasa A Podhale	5	0	—		—		—		5	0
Lubań Tylmanowa	2012–13	Klasa A Podhale	10	0	—		—		—		10	0
Lubań Tylmanowa	Total		15	0	—		—		—		15	0
Lubań Maniowy	2013–14	IV liga Lesser Poland	14	7	—		—		—		14	7
Sandecja Nowy Sącz	2013–14	I liga	0	0	0	0	—		—		0	0
Sandecja Nowy Sącz	2014–15	I liga	5	0	0	0	—		—		5	0
Sandecja Nowy Sącz	2015–16	I liga	21	3	1	0	—		—		22	3
Sandecja Nowy Sącz	2016–17	I liga	20	3	2	0	—		—		22	3
Sandecja Nowy Sącz	2017–18	Ekstraklasa	32	6	3	1	—		—		35	7
Sandecja Nowy Sącz	Total		78	12	6	1	—		—		84	13
Poprad Muszyna (loan)	2014–15	III liga, gr. G	14	2	—		—		—		14	2
Cracovia	2018–19	Ekstraklasa	28	6	2	1	—		—		30	7
Cracovia	2019–20	Ekstraklasa	15	0	3	1	1 (Note: Appearance in UEFA Europa League)	0	—		19	1
Cracovia	2020–21	Ekstraklasa	22	2	2	0	—		1 (Note: Appearance in Polish Super Cup)	0	25	2
Cracovia	2022–22	Ekstraklasa	8	2	0	0	—		—		8	2
Cracovia	Total		73	10	7	2	—		—		80	12
Cracovia II	2019–20	IV liga Lesser Poland	4	6	—		—		—		4	6
Cracovia II	2021–22	III liga, gr. IV	12	7	—		—		—		12	7
Cracovia II	Total		16	13	—		—		—		16	13
Trapani (loan)	2019–20	Serie B	11	2	—		—		—		11	2
Jagiellonia Białystok	2021–22	Ekstraklasa	5	0	—		—		—		5	0
FC Imabari	2022	J3 League	5	0	—		—		—		5	0
FC Imabari	2023	J3 League	0	0	—		—		—		0	0
FC Imabari	Total		5	0	—		—		—		5	0
Bohemians	2024	LOI Premier Division	21	2	3	0	—		—		24	2
Ischia	2024–25	Serie D - H	13	5	—		—		—		13	5
Sandecja Nowy Sącz	2025–26	II liga	30	9	—		—		2 (Note: Appearances in II liga promotion play-offs)	0	32	9
Career total			295	62	16	3	1	0	3	0	315	65

== Honours ==
Sandecja Nowy Sącz

- I liga: 2016–17

Cracovia

- Polish Cup: 2019–20
- Polish Super Cup: 2020

Cracovia II

- IV liga Lesser Poland West: 2019–20
