= Piotr Tomasik =

Polish footballer

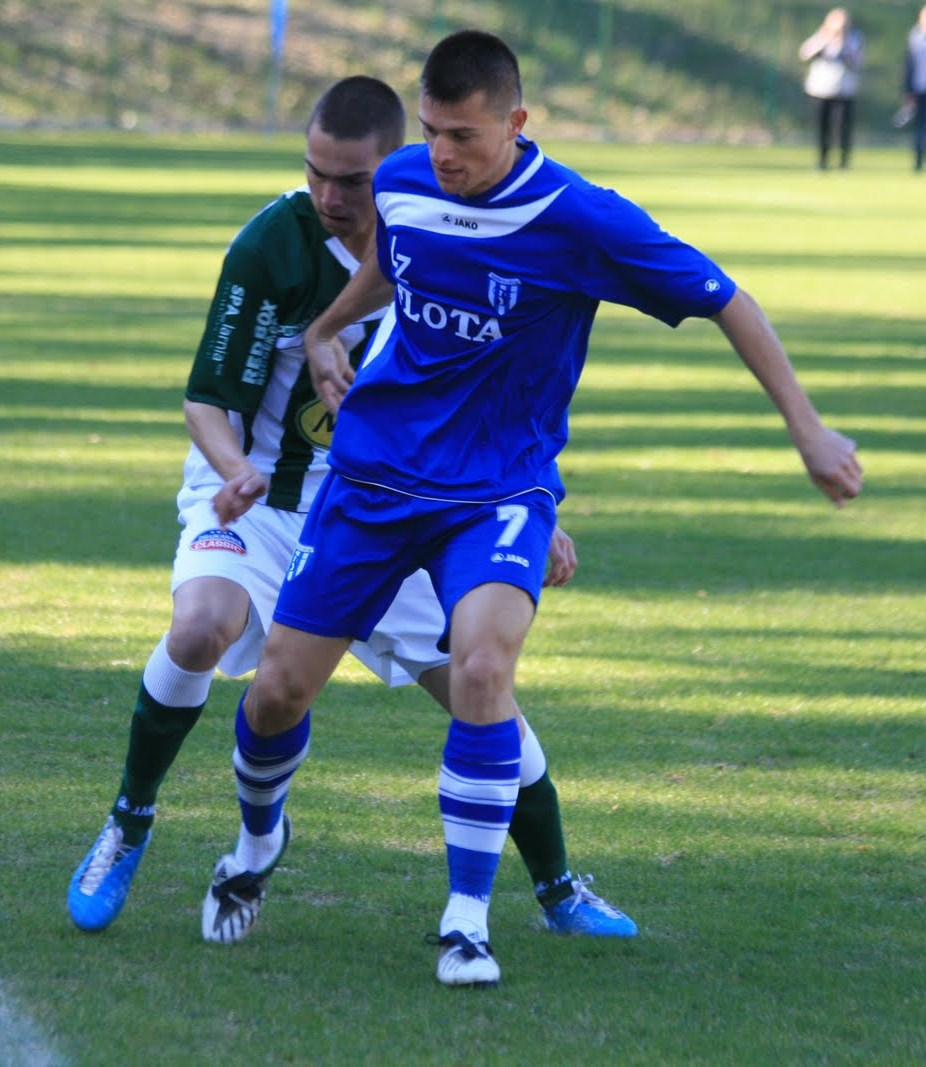

Personal information
- Full name: Piotr Tomasik
- Date of birth: 31 October 1987 (age 39)
- Place of birth: Kraków, Poland
- Height: 1.77 m (5 ft 10 in)
- Position: Left-back

Team information
- Current team: Dalin Myślenice
- Number: 19

Youth career
- 2004–2005: Hutnik Kraków

Senior career*
Years	Team	Apps	(Gls)
2005–2008	Przebój Wolbrom		(14)
2009–2010	Polonia Bytom	36	(0)
2011	Flota Świnoujście	27	(4)
2012–2014	Arka Gdynia	73	(8)
2014–2015	Podbeskidzie Bielsko-Biała	20	(0)
2015–2018	Jagiellonia Białystok	71	(3)
2018–2019	Lech Poznań	22	(0)
2019–2023	Wisła Płock	96	(5)
2023–2024	Podbeskidzie Bielsko-Biała	27	(0)
2024–2025	Wiślanie Skawina	14	(0)
2025–	Dalin Myślenice	1	(1)

International career
2009	Poland U23	3	(0)
- * Club domestic league appearances and goals as of 17:19, 11 August 2025 (UTC)

Piotr Tomasik (born 31 October 1987) is a Polish professional footballer who plays as a left-back for IV liga Lesser Poland club Dalin Myślenice.

== Career ==
Tomasik started his career with Przebój Wolbrom.

On 11 January 2018, he signed a three-and-a-half-year contract with Lech Poznań.

== Career statistics ==
As of match played 9 August 2025

Appearances and goals by club, season and competition
Club	Season	League			Polish Cup		Europe		Total	
Club	Season	Division	Apps	Goals	Apps	Goals	Apps	Goals	Apps	Goals
Przebój Wolbrom	2007–08	III liga, gr. IV	32	2	—		—		32	0
Przebój Wolbrom	2008–09	II liga	6	2	—		—		6	2
Przebój Wolbrom	Total		38	2	—		—		38	2
Polonia Bytom	2008–09	Ekstraklasa	9	0	6 (Note: One appearance in Polish Cup, five appearances in Ekstraklasa Cup)	0	—		15	0
Polonia Bytom	2009–10	Ekstraklasa	27	0	1	0	—		28	0
Polonia Bytom	Total		36	0	7	0	—		43	0
Flota Świnoujście	2010–11	I liga	13	0	—		—		13	0
Flota Świnoujście	2011–12	I liga	14	4	2	1	—		16	5
Flota Świnoujście	Total		27	4	2	1	—		29	5
Arka Gdynia	2011–12	I liga	12	3	4	1	—		16	4
Arka Gdynia	2012–13	I liga	32	1	1	0	—		33	1
Arka Gdynia	2013–14	I liga	29	4	5	3	—		34	7
Arka Gdynia	Total		73	8	10	4	—		83	12
Podbeskidzie Bielsko-Biała	2014–15	Ekstraklasa	20	0	2	0	—		22	0
Jagiellonia Białystok	2015–16	Ekstraklasa	29	3	0	0	4 (Note: Appearance(s) in UEFA Europa League)	0	33	3
Jagiellonia Białystok	2016–17	Ekstraklasa	33	0	1	0	—		34	0
Jagiellonia Białystok	2017–18	Ekstraklasa	9	0	0	0	1	0	10	0
Jagiellonia Białystok	Total		71	3	1	0	5	0	77	3
Lech Poznań	2017–18	Ekstraklasa	6	0	—		—		6	0
Lech Poznań	2018–19	Ekstraklasa	16	0	1	0	1	0	18	0
Lech Poznań	Total		22	0	1	0	1	0	24	0
Wisła Płock	2019–20	Ekstraklasa	26	3	1	0	—		27	3
Wisła Płock	2020–21	Ekstraklasa	14	0	1	0	—		15	0
Wisła Płock	2021–22	Ekstraklasa	29	2	0	0	—		29	2
Wisła Płock	2022–23	Ekstraklasa	27	0	1	0	—		28	0
Wisła Płock	Total		96	5	3	0	—		99	5
Podbeskidzie Bielsko-Biała	2023–24	I liga	27	0	2	0	—		29	0
Wiślanie Skawina	2024–25	III liga, gr. IV	14	0	—		—		14	0
Dalin Myślenice	2025–26	IV liga Lesser Poland	1	1	—		—		1	1
Career total			425	23	28	5	6	0	459	28

== Honours ==
Przebój Wolbrom

- IV liga Lesser Poland: 2006–07

Lech Poznań II

- III liga, group II: 2018–19
