= Holy War (Kraków) =

Rivalry in Polish football

The Holy War
- Location: Kraków
- Teams: Cracovia; Wisła Kraków
- First meeting: 20 September 1908; Friendly; Cracovia 1–1 Wisła
- Latest meeting: 6 November 2026; Ekstraklasa; Wisła 2–1 Cracovia
- Stadiums: Józef Piłsudski Cracovia Stadium (Cracovia); Henryk Reyman Stadium (Wisła)

Statistics
- Total meetings: 204
- Most wins: Wisła (92)
- All-time series: Cracovia: 64; Drawn: 48; Wisła: 92
- Largest victory: Wisła 7–1 Cracovia; Okupacyjne Mistrzostwa Krakowa (15 September 1940)
- Largest goal scoring: Wisła 5–5 Cracovia; Friendly (3 May 1925)

The Holy War (Polish: Święta Wojna), also known as the Kraków derby (Polish: derby Krakowa), is a rivalry in Polish football between Cracovia and Wisła Kraków, the two biggest clubs in Kraków and reportedly the oldest in Poland, both founded in 1906. The term Holy War was coined by the defender from KS Cracovia, Ludwik Gintel. It is also the theme of a song devoted to their never-ending shenanigans, played by Andrusy.

== Highlights ==
The earliest extant records of the Holy War originate from the newspaper published on 20 September 1908 informing that the match played at Błonia Park between the two teams resulted in a 1–1 draw. Earlier matches were also reported, but their results are missing from archives of the local media. The first competition in accordance with the 1904 official FIFA standards, took place on 8 May 1913 at the Cracovia stadium in Kraków, with the home team winning over Wisła 2–1.

The Holy War is considered the most intense rivalry in Poland and one of the most intense in all of Europe. Despite the fact that the two stadiums are less than a kilometre away, the fans are two bitter rivals against each other, often resulting in fights between them as well as the police.

== Clubs ==
Cracovia and Wisła Kraków are two of the oldest still existing football clubs in Poland.

Club comparison
Cracovia		Wisła Kraków
13 June 1906	Date founded	September 1906
5 (first championship – 1921)	Polish championship	13 (first championship – 1927)
1	Polish Cup	5
1	Polish Super Cup	1
47	Seasons played in Ekstraklasa (as of the 2026–27 season)	83
21 August 1921	Debut in the competition for the Polish championship	12 August 1923
25 March 1928	Debut in Ekstraklasa	3 April 1927
2	Top goalscorers in Ekstraklasa	19
Ekstraklasa	Current league level (2026–27)	Ekstraklasa
Cracovia stadium (Capacity: 15,114)	Stadium	Wisła Kraków stadium (Capacity: 33,326)

== All-time results ==
Season	Competition	Date	Home team	Result	Away team
1934–35	I Liga	05-05-1935	Wisła Kraków	4 – 0	KS Cracovia
1934–35	I Liga	08-09-1935	KS Cracovia	5 – 0	Wisła Kraków
1936–37	I Liga	27-05-1937	Wisła Kraków	1 – 1	KS Cracovia
1936–37	I Liga	05-09-1937	KS Cracovia	1 – 0	Wisła Kraków
1937–38	I Liga	01-05-1938	Wisła Kraków	2 – 2	KS Cracovia
1937–38	I Liga	02-10-1938	KS Cracovia	2 – 1	Wisła Kraków
1938–39	I Liga	07-05-1939	Wisła Kraków	5 – 1	KS Cracovia
1947–48	I Liga	06-06-1948	Wisła Kraków	0 – 2	KS Cracovia
1947–48	I Liga	31-10-1948	KS Cracovia	1 – 1	Wisła Kraków
1947–48	I Liga Playoffs	05-12-1948	KS Cracovia	3 – 1	Wisła Kraków
1948–49	I Liga	26-05-1949	Wisła Kraków	0 – 1	KS Cracovia
1948–49	I Liga	15-09-1949	KS Cracovia	0 – 0	Wisła Kraków
1949–50	I Liga	22-06-1950	Wisła Kraków	1 – 0	KS Cracovia
1949–50	I Liga	10-09-1950	KS Cracovia	1 – 3	Wisła Kraków
1950–51	I Liga	22-06-1951	KS Cracovia	0 – 0	Wisła Kraków
1950–51	I Liga	02-09-1951	Wisła Kraków	5 – 0	KS Cracovia
1952–53	I Liga	12-04-1953	KS Cracovia	4 – 2	Wisła Kraków
1952–53	I Liga	08-10-1953	Wisła Kraków	3 – 0	KS Cracovia
1953–54	I Liga	20-06-1954	KS Cracovia	0 – 0	Wisła Kraków
1953–54	I Liga	31-10-1954	Wisła Kraków	1 – 1	KS Cracovia
1955–56	Puchar Polski	20-11-1955	Wisła Kraków	3 – 1	KS Cracovia
1957–58	I Liga	20-04-1958	Wisła Kraków	1 – 2	KS Cracovia
1957–58	I Liga	14-08-1958	KS Cracovia	1 – 1	Wisła Kraków
1958–59	I Liga	20-11-1966	KS Cracovia	0 – 1	Wisła Kraków
1958–59	I Liga	13-09-1959	Wisła Kraków	2 – 3	KS Cracovia
1961–62	I Liga	11-06-1961	Wisła Kraków	1 – 0	KS Cracovia
1961–62	I Liga	24-09-1961	KS Cracovia	0 – 1	Wisła Kraków
1966–67	I Liga	20-11-1966	KS Cracovia	1 – 2	Wisła Kraków
1966–67	I Liga	10-06-1967	Wisła Kraków	3 – 0	KS Cracovia
1969–70	I Liga	24-09-1969	KS Cracovia	2 – 3	Wisła Kraków
1969–70	I Liga	24-05-1970	Wisła Kraków	2 – 0	KS Cracovia
1982–83	I Liga	11-09-1982	Wisła Kraków	0 – 0	KS Cracovia
1982–83	Puchar Polski	22-09-1982	KS Cracovia	2 – 2 p	Wisła Kraków
1982–83	I Liga	23-04-1983	KS Cracovia	2 – 1	Wisła Kraków
1983–84	I Liga	13-08-1983	Wisła Kraków	0 – 0	KS Cracovia
1983–84	I Liga	17-03-1984	KS Cracovia	0 – 0	Wisła Kraków
1995–96	II Liga	24-09-1995	Wisła Kraków	0 – 1	KS Cracovia
1995–96	II Liga	15-05-1996	KS Cracovia	0 – 2	Wisła Kraków

Season	Competition	Date	Home team	Result	Away team
2004–05	I Liga	02-10-2004	Wisła Kraków	0 – 0	KS Cracovia
2004–05	I Liga	05-05-2005	KS Cracovia	0 – 1	Wisła Kraków
2005–06	Ekstraklasa	22-11-2005	Wisła Kraków	3 – 0	KS Cracovia
2005–06	Ekstraklasa	11-03-2006	KS Cracovia	1 – 1	Wisła Kraków
2006–07	Ekstraklasa	27-10-2006	Wisła Kraków	3 – 0	KS Cracovia
2006–07	Ekstraklasa	13-05-2007	KS Cracovia	0 – 0	Wisła Kraków
2007–08	Ekstraklasa	20-10-2007	KS Cracovia	1 – 2	Wisła Kraków
2007–08	Ekstraklasa	20-04-2008	Wisła Kraków	2 – 1	KS Cracovia
2008–09	Ekstraklasa	31-08-2008	KS Cracovia	1 – 1	Wisła Kraków
2008–09	Ekstraklasa Cup	09-10-2008	Wisła Kraków	2 – 0	KS Cracovia
2008–09	Ekstraklasa Cup	26-11-2008	KS Cracovia	0 – 0	Wisła Kraków
2008–09	Ekstraklasa	22-03-2009	Wisła Kraków	4 – 1	KS Cracovia
2009–10	Ekstraklasa	22-11-2009	Wisła Kraków	0 – 1	KS Cracovia
2009–10	Ekstraklasa	11-05-2010	KS Cracovia	1 – 1	Wisła Kraków
2010–11	Ekstraklasa	05-11-2010	KS Cracovia	0 – 1	Wisła Kraków
2010–11	Ekstraklasa	15-05-2011	Wisła Kraków	1 – 0	KS Cracovia
2011–12	Ekstraklasa	06-11-2011	KS Cracovia	1 – 0	Wisła Kraków
2011–12	Ekstraklasa	30-04-2012	Wisła Kraków	1 – 0	KS Cracovia
2013–14	Ekstraklasa	21-09-2013	KS Cracovia	1 – 1	Wisła Kraków
2013–14	Ekstraklasa	23-02-2014	Wisła Kraków	3 – 1	KS Cracovia
2014–15	Ekstraklasa	28-09-2014	KS Cracovia	1 – 0	Wisła Kraków
2014–15	Ekstraklasa	21-03-2015	Wisła Kraków	2 – 1	KS Cracovia
2015–16	Ekstraklasa	24-07-2015	KS Cracovia	1 – 1	Wisła Kraków
2015–16	Ekstraklasa	29-11-2015	Wisła Kraków	1 – 2	KS Cracovia
2016–17	Ekstraklasa	05-08-2016	KS Cracovia	2 – 1	Wisła Kraków
2016–17	Ekstraklasa	10-12-2016	Wisła Kraków	1 – 1	KS Cracovia
2017–18	Ekstraklasa	12-08-2017	Wisła Kraków	2 – 1	KS Cracovia
2017–18	Ekstraklasa	13-12-2017	KS Cracovia	1 – 4	Wisła Kraków
2018–19	Ekstraklasa	07-10-2018	KS Cracovia	0 – 2	Wisła Kraków
2018–19	Ekstraklasa	17-03-2019	Wisła Kraków	3 – 2	KS Cracovia
2019–20	Ekstraklasa	29-09-2019	Wisła Kraków	0 – 1	KS Cracovia
2019–20	Ekstraklasa	03-03-2020	KS Cracovia	0 – 2	Wisła Kraków
2020–21	Ekstraklasa	04-12-2020	KS Cracovia	1 – 1	Wisła Kraków
2020–21	Ekstraklasa	24-04-2021	Wisła Kraków	0 – 0	KS Cracovia
2021–22	Ekstraklasa	07-11-2021	Wisła Kraków	1 – 0	KS Cracovia
2021–22	Ekstraklasa	01-05-2022	KS Cracovia	0 – 0	Wisła Kraków
2026–27	Ekstraklasa	06-11-2026	Wisła Kraków	2 – 1	KS Cracovia

- 1982 Puchar Polski match ended 2–2, Wisła won 5–3 on penalties.

== Players who played for both clubs ==
The following players were under contract with the first team of both clubs after the 1927 season.

Name	Position	Cracovia	Wisła Kraków
(Poland) Artur Bugaj	Forward	1989–1990	1988–1989, 1990–1991
(Poland) Jacek Bzukała	Midfielder	1984–1985	1985–1987
(Poland) Radosław Cierzniak	Goalkeeper	2012	2015–2016
(Poland) Adam Dąbrowski	Midfielder	1997	1996–1997
(Poland) Henryk Duda	Defender	1973–1979	1968–1973
(Poland) Mieczysław Dudek	Defender	1953	1949–1951, 1955–1956
(Cameroon) Guy Feutchine	Midfielder	1997–1998	1996–1997
(Poland) Mateusz Jelonek	Forward	1987–1988, 1992–1993	1988–1991
(Poland) Jan Karwecki	Goalkeeper	1980–1981	1978–1980
(Poland) Walerian Kisieliński	Forward	1933–1935	1930–1932
(Poland) Zbigniew Klaja	Midfielder	1990	1983–1989
(Poland) Wiesław Lendzion	Forward	1974–1976	1965–1973
(Poland) Radosław Matusiak	Forward	2009–2011	2008
(Poland) Marek Motyka	Defender	1991–1993	1978–1990
(Poland) Zdzisław Mordarski	Defender	1956	1949–1956
(Poland) Andrzej Niedzielan	Forward	2011	2007–2009
(Poland) Paweł Nowak	Midfielder	2002–2009	1997–2003
(Poland) Zbigniew Opoka	Forward	1955–1958	1959
(Poland) Krzysztof Piszczek	Midfielder	2002–2004	1996–1997
(Poland) Krzysztof Radwański	Defender	2002–2009	1998
(Poland) Artur Sarnat	Goalkeeper	1993	1993–2001, 2002–2003
(Poland) Ryszard Sarnat	Forward	1967–1970	1970–1974
(Poland) Łukasz Skrzyński	Defender	1998–1999, 2002–2008	1995–2000
(Poland) Łukasz Sosin	Forward	1996–1997	2000–2001
(Poland) Janusz Sputo	Forward	1974	1966–1972
(Poland) Henryk Stroniarz	Goalkeeper	1961–1963	1964–1971
(Poland) Janusz Surowiec	Midfielder	1977–1984	1973–1977
(Poland) Henryk Szymanowski	Defender	1983–1986	1971–1983
(Poland) Adam Wapiennik	Midfielder	1954–1955	1946–1950
(Poland) Kazimierz Węgrzyn	Defender	2003–2005	1998–2000
(Poland) Dariusz Zawadzki	Midfielder	2003	2001–2004

== Managers who managed both clubs ==
Name	Cracovia	Wisła Kraków
(Poland) Roman Durniok	1974–1975, 1984	1982–1983
(Czech Republic) Karel Finek	1956–1957, 1961	1960–1961
(Poland) Lucjan Franczak	1991–1993	1979–1981, 1985–1986, 1994–1996
(Czech Republic) František Koželuh	1911–1912, 1924, 1926	1929–1934
(Poland) Orest Lenczyk	2009–2010	1977–1979, 1984–1985, 1994, 2000–2001
(Poland) Michał Matyas	1959–1961, 1968–1969, 1972–1973	1970–1971
(Poland) Michał Probierz	2017–2021	2012
(Poland) Czesław Skoraczyński	1958	1954–1955, 1964–1967
(Poland) Henryk Stroniarz	1980–1983, 1984–1985	1974–1975
