= Piotr Skrobowski =

Polish footballer

Personal information
- Date of birth: 16 October 1961 (age 65)
- Place of birth: Kraków, Poland
- Height: 1.81 m (5 ft 11 1/2 in)
- Position: Defender

Senior career*
| Years | Team | Apps | (Gls) |
| 1975–1977 | Clepardia Kraków | | |
| 1977–1985 | Wisła Kraków | 120 | (7) |
| 1985–1988 | Lech Poznań | 52 | (0) |
| 1988–1990 | Olimpia Poznań | 41 | (0) |
| 1990–1992 | Hammarby IF | | |

International career
| 1980–1984 | Poland | 15 | (0) |
Medal record
Men's football
Representing Poland
FIFA World Cup
| Third place | 1982 Spain |
UEFA European Under-18 Championship
| Runner-up | 1980 East Germany |
- * Club domestic league appearances and goals

Piotr Skrobowski (born 16 October 1961) is a Polish former professional footballer who played as a defender. He played for a few clubs, including Wisła Kraków, Lech Poznań, and Swedish club Hammarby IF. He earned 15 caps for the Poland national team and was a participant at the 1982 FIFA World Cup, where Poland won the bronze medal.

== Honours ==
Lech Poznań

- Polish Cup: 1987–88

Poland

- FIFA World Cup third place: 1982

Poland U18

- UEFA European Under-18 Championship runner-up: 1980

Individual

- Polish Newcomer of the Year: 1980
