= Józef Panuś =

Polish footballer

Personal information
- Date of birth: 22 February 1963 (age 63)
- Height: 1.75 m (5 ft 9 in)
- Position: Midfielder

Senior career*
Years	Team	Apps	(Gls)
- Bor Borzęta
- Dalin Myślenice
- Orlęta Dęblin
- Dalin Myślenice
1986–1991	GKS Tychy		
1991–1992	Zagłębie Sosnowiec	17	(0)
1992–1994	Dalin Myślenice		
1994–1996	Karpaty Siepraw		
2017	Sokół Borzęta		

Managerial career
- Tempo Rzeszotary
- Karpaty Siepraw
- Pcimianka Pcim
- Gościb Sułkowice
- Hejnał Krzyszkowice
- 2011-?: Sokół Borzęta
- * Club domestic league appearances and goals

Józef Panuś (born 22 February 1963) is a Polish former professional football player, manager, and current reality television personality, musician, entrepreneur in wood carpentry and sculpture, and conservator.

After having played for local clubs, most notably for the then third division Dalin Myślenice, he was sold to Silesian mining club GKS Tychy for a transfer fee of 2 tonnes of coal.

He played 17 games in the Ekstraklasa for Zagłębie Sosnowiec before a career-threatening injury caused him to take a break and returning to play much later at the third tier again.

He re-gained fame in 2021 by appearing in the television reality show Ninja Warrior Poland, where he played his accordion, having played it from a young age and even taking it to his away matches during his playing career.
