= Tomasz Moskała =

Polish footballer (born 1977)

Personal information
- Date of birth: 5 April 1977 (age 49)
- Place of birth: Wadowice, Poland
- Height: 1.69 m (5 ft 7 in)
- Position: Striker

Team information
- Current team: Beskid Andrychów (manager)

Senior career*
Years	Team	Apps	(Gls)
- Beskid Andrychów
1999–2000	BBTS Bielsko-Biała		
2000	→ Ruch Chorzów (loan)	2	(0)
2001	GKS Katowice	28	(11)
2001–2004	Dyskobolia Grodzisk Wielkopolski	61	(16)
2004–2010	Cracovia	131	(19)
2011	Puszcza Niepołomice	20	(1)
2012–2016	Beskid Andrychów	106	(15)
2016	Halniak Maków Podhalański		
2016–2021	Beskid Andrychów		

International career
2002	Poland	1	(0)

Managerial career
- 2021–: Beskid Andrychów
- * Club domestic league appearances and goals

Tomasz Moskała (born 5 April 1977) is a Polish former professional footballer who played as a striker. He is currently the manager of IV liga Lesser Poland club Beskid Andrychów.

== Playing career ==
In February 2011, Moskała joined Puszcza Niepołomice. He played once for the Poland national team.

== Managerial statistics ==
As of match played 20 June 2026

Managerial record by team and tenure
Team	From	To	Record							
Team	From	To	G	W	D	L	GF	GA	GD	Win %
Beskid Andrychów	8 July 2021	Present	211	117	32	62	462	298	+164	55.45
Total			211	117	32	62	462	298	+164	55.45

== Honours ==
=== Player ===
Beskid Andrychów

- Polish Cup (Wadowice regionals): 2020–21

Individual

- Polish Newcomer of the Year: 2001

=== Managerial ===
Beskid Andrychów

- Polish Cup (Lesser Poland regionals): 2024–25, 2025–26
- Polish Cup (Wadowice regionals): 2022–23, 2023–24, 2024–25, 2025–26
