= Piaski Wielkie =

Piaski Wielkie can refer to:

- Piaski Wielkie, West Pomeranian Voivodeship
- Piaski Wielkie, Kraków
- Piaski Wielkie, Lublin Voivodeship, a colony near Piaski, Świdnik County
