= Wiesław Dybczak =

Polish footballer (1957–2023)

Personal information
- Date of birth: 18 April 1957
- Place of birth: Kraków, Poland
- Date of death: 30 November 2023 (aged 66)
- Place of death: Kraków, Poland
- Height: 1.86 m (6 ft 1 in)
- Position: Sweeper

Youth career
- Clepardia Kraków

Senior career*
| Years | Team | Apps | (Gls) |
| 1972–1976 | Clepardia Kraków | | |
| 1977–1979 | Garbarnia Kraków | | |
| 1979–1985 | Cracovia | 165 | (15) |
| 1985–1988 | Hutnik Kraków | | |
| 1988–1989 | Cracovia | 25 | (2) |
| 1989–1996 | Clepardia Kraków | | |
- * Club domestic league appearances and goals

Wiesław Dybczak (18 April 1957 – 30 November 2023) was a Polish professional footballer.

He was best known for his time at Cracovia, playing in 58 top flight matches in the 1982–83 and 1983–84 seasons. He also played for them in the second and third divisions where he amassed many more caps for them.

He spent his entire career in his hometown city, having played for Hutnik, Garbarnia, and the club he supported and watched, Clepardia Kraków.

Left-footed Dybczak was considered a great talent and struck a strong defensive partnership with fellow sweeper Andrzej Turecki at Cracovia.

Despite his fame, after retiring from playing he struggled with alcoholism and had difficulty finding regular work.

He died aged 66 on 30 November 2023 after a long illness and his funeral was held on 8 December 2023 at Rakowiczan cemetery in Kraków.
