= Wincenty Witos Street =

Street in Kraków, Poland

Wincenty Witos street
Kraków
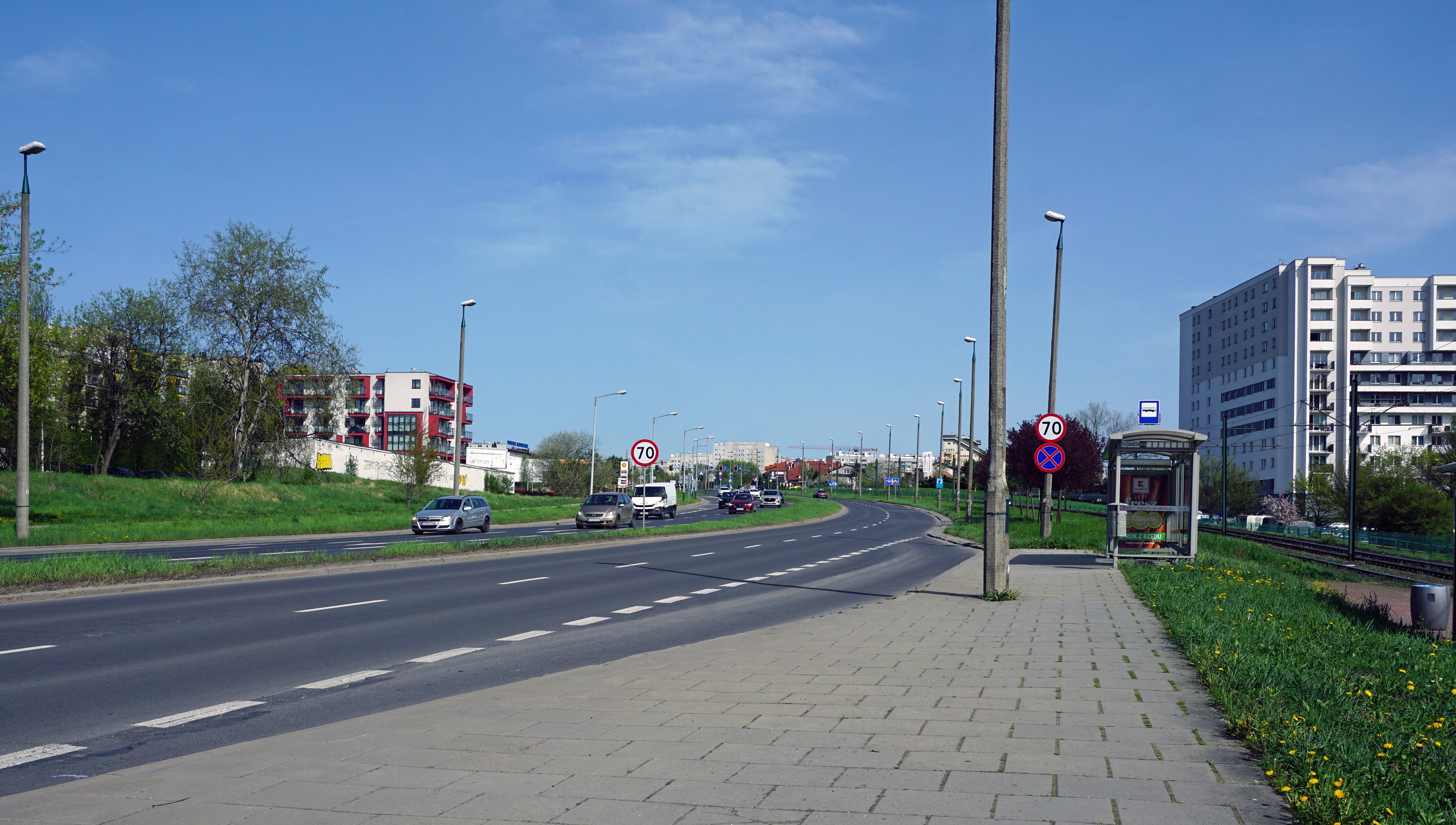
- View from the west
- Interactive map of Wincenty Witos street
- Part of: Kraków Podgórze Ducackie district
- Owner: City of Kraków
- Location: Kraków, Poland

Wincenty Witos Street is a street in Kraków, located in district Podgórze Duchackie. It is part of Kraków's Third Beltway.

== History ==
The street was laid out around 1980. In 2000, a tram track was opened along the street, running from Wielicka Street to the "Kurdwanów P+R" terminus. This tram track is part of the Kraków Fast Tram system.

== Route ==
The street begins at the intersection with Nowosądecka and Łużycka streets, where it becomes an extension of the former. Along its central section, several dozen meters past the intersection with Gołaśka Street, stands the Church of the Exaltation of the Holy Cross. The street also houses one of the branches of the Kraków Library. Further on, the street runs westward, where, at the intersection with Jan „Halszka” Kowalkowski Street and Beskidzka Street, the "Kurdwanów P+R" tram terminus is located – the only elevated tram terminus in Kraków. The street ends at the intersection with Zbigniew Herbert Street, Jerzy Turowicz Street, and Łagiewnicka Route, where it continues as Łagiewnicka Route.

== Infrastructure ==
Wincenty Witos Street is a four-lane road with a tram track leading to the "Kurdwanów P+R" terminus and Borek Fałęcki, situated in a green strip separating the two carriageways. Along the street, there are three tram-bus stops operated by MPK Kraków: "Nowosądecka" (at the intersection with Nowosądecka and Łużycka Streets), "Witosa" (near the apartment blocks of Osiedle Kurdwanów Nowy), and the tram-bus terminus "Kurdwanów P+R" (at the intersection with Beskidzka Street and Jan „Halszka” Kowalkowski Street). The street is part of Kraków's Third Beltway.

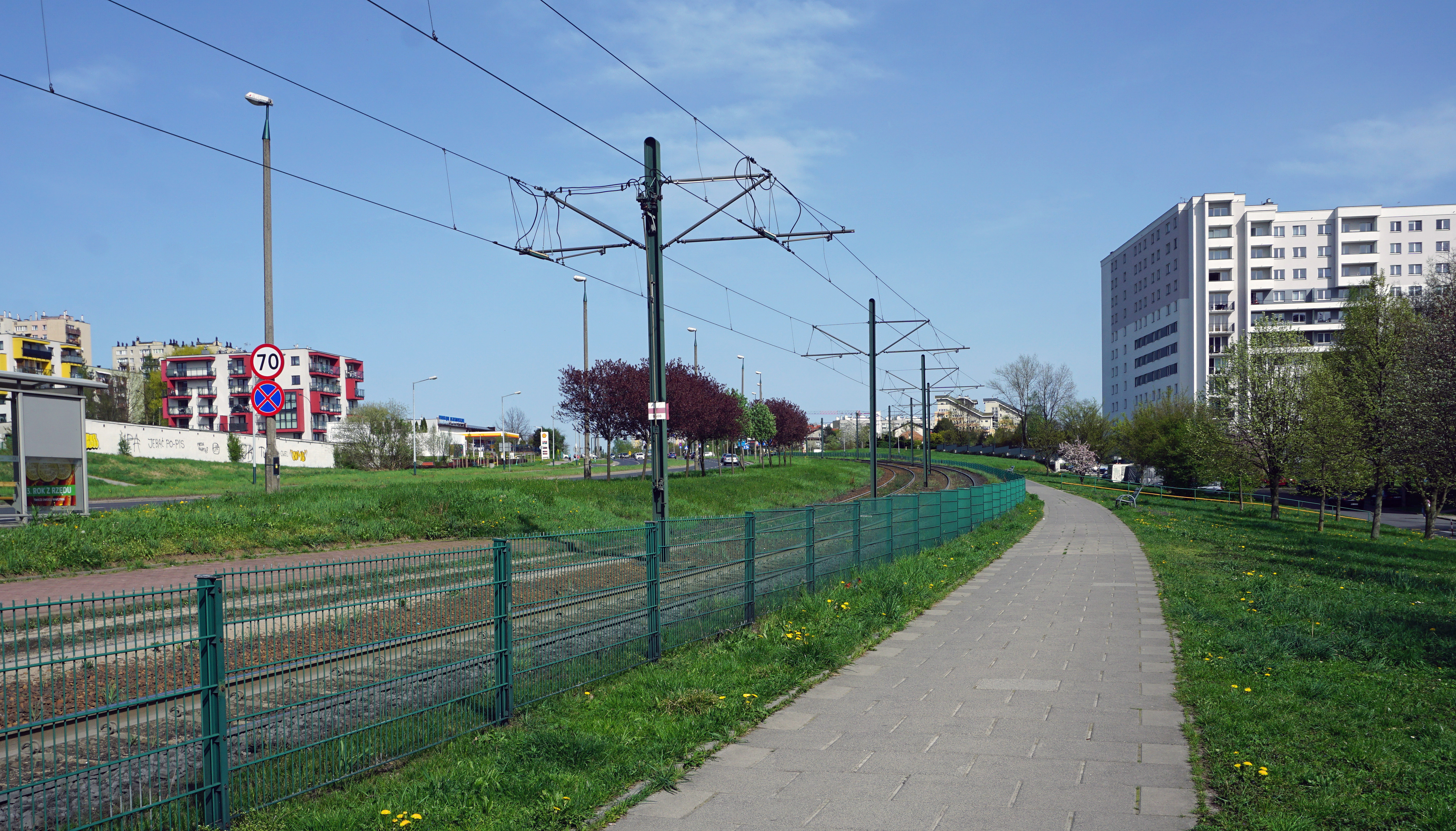
Tramway tracks
