= Tadeusz Piotrowski =

Tadeusz Piotrowski may refer to:

- Tadeusz Piotrowski (footballer) (1947–2023), Polish association footballer and manager
- Tadeusz Piotrowski (linguist), (born 1957), professor of linguistics and lexicographer
- Tadeusz Piotrowski (activist) (1945–1994), social activist and board member of the Polish Red Cross
- Tadeusz Piotrowski (mountaineer) (1940–1986), mountaineer and writer
- Tadeusz Piotrowski (sailor) (born 1940), sailor, engineer, and former Olympian.
- Tadeusz Piotrowski (sociologist) (born 1940), sociologist, historian and writer
