= Orzeł Piaski Wielkie =

Polish football club

- Full name: Klub Sportowy Orzeł Piaski Wielkie
- Founded: 19 April 1944; 81 years ago
- Ground: Prelate Franciszek Dźwigoński Stadium
- Capacity: 500
- Chairman: Józef Wajda
- Manager: Tomasz Szczytyński
- League: V liga Lesser Poland West
- 2024–25: Regional league Kraków II, 1st of 14 (promoted)
Home colours	Away colours

KS Orzeł Piaski Wielkie is a Polish football club based in Piaski Wielkie, a neighbourhood in the Podgórze Duchackie district of Kraków. They currently play in the western Lesser Poland group of the V liga, the sixth tier of the Polish football league.

== Season to season ==
Season	Tier	Division	Place
2001–02	4	IV liga Lesser Poland	9th
2002–03	4	IV liga Lesser Poland	8th
2003–04	4	IV liga Lesser Poland	10th
2004–05	4	IV liga Lesser Poland	11th
2005–06	4	IV liga Lesser Poland	10th (Note: Relegated due to reorganisation of the leagues. From the 2006–07 season, there was one IV liga group in Lesser Poland (replacing the two groups). Teams relegated to the newly formed V liga (two groups).)
2006–07	5	V liga Lesser Poland	12th
2007–08	5	V liga Lesser Poland	9th
2008–09	6	V liga Lesser Poland	3rd
2009–10	6	V liga Lesser Poland	10th
2010–11	6	V liga Lesser Poland	3rd
2011–12	5	IV liga Lesser Poland	10th
2012–13	5	IV liga Lesser Poland	3rd

Season	Tier	Division	Place
2013–14	5	IV liga Lesser Poland	9th
2014–15	5	IV liga Lesser Poland	2nd
2015–16	5	IV liga Lesser Poland	4th
2016–17	5	IV liga Lesser Poland	14th
2017–18	5	IV liga Lesser Poland	11th
2018–19	5	IV liga Lesser Poland	10th
2019–20	5	IV liga Lesser Poland	8th
2020–21	5	IV liga Lesser Poland	15th (Note: Relegated due to reorganisation of the leagues. From the 2021–21 season, the V liga was re-established, with the IV liga being split to two groups in Lesser Poland.)
2021–22	7	Regional league Kraków II	5th
2022–23	7	Regional league Kraków II	2nd
2023–24	6	V liga Lesser Poland West	13th
2024–25	7	Regional league Kraków II	1st

== Squad ==
As of 29 March 2021

Note: Flags indicate national team as defined under FIFA eligibility rules; some limited exceptions apply. Players may hold more than one non-FIFA nationality.

No.	Pos.	Nation	Player
—	GK	(Poland) POL	Maciej Palczewski
—	GK	(Poland) POL	Hubert Makowski
—	GK	(Poland) POL	Karol Marynowski
—	DF	(Poland) POL	Jan Kret
—	DF	(Poland) POL	Michał Bartosz
—	DF	(Nigeria) NGA	Henry Kechukwu Uwakwe
—	DF	(Poland) POL	Fabian Tatarski
—	DF	(Poland) POL	Bartosz Tomana
—	DF	(Poland) POL	Dawid Nienartowicz
—	DF	(Poland) POL	Nikodem Michura
—	DF	(Poland) POL	Marcin Kądziołka
—	MF	(Poland) POL	Piotr Wajda
—	MF	(Poland) POL	Maciej Śliski

No.	Pos.	Nation	Player
—	MF	(Poland) POL	Wiktor Mazur
—	MF	(Poland) POL	Jakub Sulima
—	MF	(Poland) POL	Łukasz Feret
—	MF	(Poland) POL	Mateusz Feret
—	MF	(Poland) POL	Bartosz Kołodziejczyk
—	MF	(Poland) POL	Piotr Putek
—	MF	(Poland) POL	Szymon Wdowiak
—	MF	(Poland) POL	Paweł Kociołek
—	FW	(Poland) POL	Jakub Wcisło
—	FW	(Nigeria) NGA	Ifeanyi Nwachukwu
—	FW	(Poland) POL	Gabriel Janusik
—	FW	(Poland) POL	Mateusz Ciesielski

== Coaching staff ==
As of 29 September 2024

Head coach	(Poland) Tomasz Szczytyński
