= Ruslan Skydan =

Ukrainian footballer

Personal information
- Full name: Ruslan Vitaliyovych Skydan
- Date of birth: 29 June 2001 (age 25)
- Place of birth: Odesa, Ukraine
- Height: 1.78 m (5 ft 10 in)
- Position: Right winger

Team information
- Current team: Polonia Słubice

Youth career
- 2014–2017: DYuSSh-11 Odesa
- 2017–2018: Dynamo Kyiv

Senior career*
Years	Team	Apps	(Gls)
2018–2019	Dynamo Kyiv	0	(0)
2019–2021	Zorya Luhansk	0	(0)
2021–2022	Obolon Kyiv	8	(0)
2021	Obolon-2 Bucha	8	(1)
2022–2024	Lubań Maniowy	43	(18)
2024	Poprad Muszyna	6	(3)
2024–2025	Puszcza Niepołomice	0	(0)
2024–2025	→ Sparta Kazimierza Wielka (loan)	9	(1)
2025	Poprad Muszyna	14	(2)
2025–	Polonia Słubice	0	(0)
- * Club domestic league appearances and goals as of 08:49, 19 June 2025 (UTC)

Ruslan Vitaliyovych Skydan (Ukrainian: Руслан Віталійович Скидан; born 29 June 2001) is a Ukrainian professional footballer who plays as a right winger for IV liga Lubusz club Polonia Słubice.

On 3 March 2022, Skydan moved to Poland to join IV liga club Lubań Maniowy.

In the summer of 2024, Skydan joined Ekstraklasa club Puszcza Niepołomice and was subsequently sent on loan to another IV liga side Sparta Kazimierza Wielka. He returned to Puszcza on 9 January 2025.

On 5 March 2025, Skydan rejoined Poprad Muszyna.
