= Michał Szeliga =

Polish footballer

Personal information
- Full name: Michał Szeliga
- Date of birth: 24 September 1995 (age 31)
- Place of birth: Nowy Sącz, Poland
- Height: 1.86 m (6 ft 1 in)
- Position: Centre-back

Team information
- Current team: Poprad Muszyna
- Number: 14

Youth career
- Sandecja Nowy Sącz

Senior career*
Years	Team	Apps	(Gls)
2014–2020	Sandecja Nowy Sącz	12	(1)
2017–2018	→ Rozwój Katowice (loan)	26	(2)
2020–2021	Lubań Maniowy	32	(1)
2022–	Poprad Muszyna	69	(4)
- * Club domestic league appearances and goals as of 08:57, 19 June 2025 (UTC)

Michał Szeliga (born 24 September 1995) is a Polish footballer who plays as centre-back for IV liga Lesser Poland club Poprad Muszyna.
