= Krzysztof Radwański =

Polish footballer

Personal information
- Full name: Krzysztof Radwański
- Date of birth: 26 May 1978 (age 48)
- Place of birth: Kraków, Poland
- Height: 1.77 m (5 ft 10 in)
- Position: Defender

Youth career
- Orzeł Piaski Wielkie

Senior career*
Years	Team	Apps	(Gls)
1997	Wisła Kraków II		
1998	Wisła Kraków	0	(0)
1998–1999	Wisła Kraków II		
1999	Dalin Myślenice		
2000–2002	Proszowianka Proszowice		
2002–2009	Cracovia	162	(0)
2009–2010	Górnik Łęczna	26	(0)
2009–2010	Górnik Łęczna II	9	(0)
2010	Kolejarz Stróże	13	(0)
2011–2012	Puszcza Niepołomice	35	(0)
2012–2013	Orzeł Piaski Wielkie	24	(0)
2013–2017	Wiślanie Jaśkowice	112	(13)
2018	Czarni Staniątki	4	(0)
- * Club domestic league appearances and goals

Krzysztof Radwański (born 26 May 1978) is a Polish former professional footballer who played as a defender.

== Career ==
In December 2010, he joined Puszcza Niepołomice.

== Honours ==
Cracovia

- III liga, group IV: 2002–03

Wiślanie Jaśkowice

- IV liga Lesser Poland West: 2016–17
