= Radwański =

Radwański is a Polish locational surname, which means a person from a place in Poland called Radwan. Radwańska is the female form. Alternative spellings include Radwanskiand and Radwansky. The surname may refer to:

- Agnieszka Radwańska (born 1989), Polish former tennis player
- Ed Radwanski (born 1963), American soccer player
- George Radwanski (1947–2014), Canadian journalist
- Krzysztof Radwański (born 1978), Polish football player
- Urszula Radwańska (born 1990), Polish tennis player, younger sister of Agnieszka

== See also ==
- Radovan
