= Kamil Włodyka =

Polish footballer (born 1994)

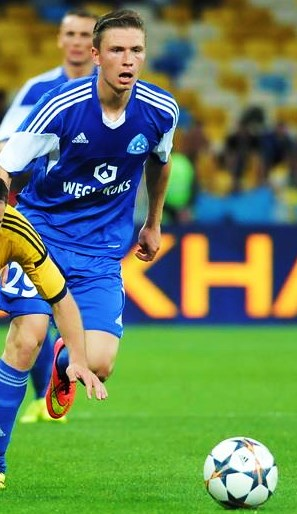
- Włodyka playing for Ruch Chorzów in 2014

Personal information
- Full name: Kamil Włodyka
- Date of birth: 11 October 1994 (age 32)
- Place of birth: Jaworzno, Poland
- Height: 1.80 m (5 ft 11 in)
- Position: Right winger

Team information
- Current team: Victoria Jaworzno
- Number: 99

Youth career
- Szczakowianka Jaworzno
- –2010: MCKiS Sokół Jaworzno
- 2010–2011: Ruch Chorzów

Senior career*
Years	Team	Apps	(Gls)
2011–2016	Ruch Chorzów	37	(0)
2014–2016	Ruch Chorzów II	35	(7)
2015	→ Termalica Bruk-Bet (loan)	4	(1)
2016–2017	MKS Trzebinia-Siersza	12	(3)
2017	Polonia Bytom	13	(3)
2017–2018	Znicz Pruszków	23	(2)
2018–2019	Gryf Wejherowo	21	(3)
2019–2020	Garbarnia Kraków	23	(0)
2020–2021	Kotwica Kołobrzeg	29	(6)
2021	Elana Toruń	18	(5)
2022–2024	Pogoń Siedlce	41	(2)
2024–2025	Zawisza Bydgoszcz	17	(2)
2025–2026	Wieczysta Kraków II	10	(0)
2026–	Victoria Jaworzno	13	(4)

International career
2012	Poland U19	7	(3)
2013	Poland U20	4	(1)
- * Club domestic league appearances and goals as of 22:33, 25 June 2026 (UTC)

Kamil Włodyka (born 11 October 1994) is a Polish professional footballer who plays as a right winger for IV liga Lesser Poland club Victoria Jaworzno.

== Career ==
=== Garbarnia Kraków ===
On 3 January 2019, Włodyka joined Garbarnia Kraków for one year.

== Honours ==
Zawisza Bygdoszcz

- Polish Cup (Kuyavia-Pomerania regionals): 2024–25

Victoria Jaworzno

- V liga Lesser Poland West: 2025–26
