= Skydan =

Skydan is a surname. Notable people with the surname include:

- Hanna Skydan (born 1992), Ukrainian-Azerbaijani hammer thrower
- Ruslan Skydan (born 2001), Ukrainian footballer
