= Tadeusz Piotrowski (footballer) =

Polish footballer and manager

Personal information
- Date of birth: 17 April 1947
- Place of birth: Kraków, Poland
- Date of death: 17 October 2023 (aged 76)
- Place of death: Kraków, Poland
- Height: 1.77 m (5 ft 10 in)
- Position: Defender

Youth career
- Krakus Nowa Huta

Senior career*
Years	Team	Apps	(Gls)
1963–1965	Krakus Nowa Huta		
1965–1974	Cracovia	33+	
1974–1975	Polonia Milwaukee		
1975–1976	Cracovia		(3)
1976–1977	Prokocim Kraków		
1977–1978	Wisłoka Dębica		

Managerial career
- Prokocim Kraków
- Wisłoka Dębica
- JKS Jarosław
- Polonia Milwaukee
- Garbarnia Kraków
- 1987–1988: Cracovia
- Skeid (coach)
- Bærum SK (coach)
- Kjelsås Fotball (coach)
- Lyn Oslo (coach)
- Kabel Kraków
- Puszcza Niepołomice
- Karpaty Siepraw
- Górnik Wieliczka
- 2011–2012: Dalin Myślenice
- 2012–2013: Wieczysta Kraków
- * Club domestic league appearances and goals

Tadeusz Piotrowski (17 April 1947 – 17 October 2023) was a Polish professional football player and manager.

He was best known for his time at his hometown club Cracovia, playing in 13 top flight matches in the 1969–70 season.

He also played for Krakus Nowa Huta, the American Polonia Milwaukee, Prokocim Kraków and Wisłoka Dębica.

After retirement from playing, he became a coach, although he studied at AWF Kraków whilst still a player. His managerial highlight was leading Puszcza Niepołomice from the fourth division to the second. He also coached lower league Norwegian clubs as well as managed the Lesser Poland team in the UEFA Regions Cup.
