= MKS Trzebinia =

Polish football club

- Full name: Miejski Klub Sportowy Trzebinia
- Founded: 2000; 25 years ago
- Ground: Kościuszki 33 Street Stadium
- Capacity: 655
- Chairman: Tomasz Kobierecki
- Manager: Piotr Chlipała
- League: IV liga Lesser Poland
- 2024–25: IV liga Lesser Poland, 13th of 19

Miejski Klub Sportowy Trzebinia is a Polish football club based in Trzebinia. They currently play in the IV liga Lesser Poland.

== Current squad ==
As of 11 July 2017

Note: Flags indicate national team as defined under FIFA eligibility rules; some limited exceptions apply. Players may hold more than one non-FIFA nationality.

No.	Pos.	Nation	Player
1	GK	(Poland) POL	Krzysztof Pająk
2	DF	(Poland) POL	Tomasz Sanok
3	MF	(Poland) POL	Sebastian Ołownia
4	DF	(Poland) POL	Marcin Kalinowski
5	DF	(Poland) POL	Paweł Sawczuk
6	MF	(Poland) POL	Tomasz Małodobry
7	FW	(Poland) POL	Jakub Pająk
8	FW	(Poland) POL	Rajmund Raźniak
9	MF	(Poland) POL	Michał Kowalik
10	MF	(Poland) POL	Mateusz Majcherczyk

No.	Pos.	Nation	Player
11	FW	(Poland) POL	Paweł Piskorz
12	GK	(Poland) POL	Tomasz Wróbel
14	DF	(Poland) POL	Mateusz Niechciał
16	MF	(Poland) POL	Maciej Domurat
18	MF	(Poland) POL	Marek Mizia
19	MF	(Poland) POL	Dariusz Gawęcki
20	DF	(Poland) POL	Radosław Górka
21	DF	(Poland) POL	Bartosz Jagła
22	MF	(Poland) POL	Gaspar Repa
—	MF	(Poland) POL	Kamil Włodyka

== See also ==
- Football in Poland
