= Glinik Gorlice =

Polish football club

- Full name: Gorlicki Klub Sportowy Glinik Gorlice
- Founded: 1921; 105 years ago
- Ground: Stadion Glinik Gorlice
- Capacity: 800
- Chairman: Tomasz Sekuła
- Manager: Łukasz Krzysztoń
- League: IV liga Lesser Poland
- 2025–26: IV liga Lesser Poland, 4th of 19
- Website: http://gksglinik.pl/
Home colours	Away colours

Glinik Gorlice is a Polish football club based in Gorlice, Poland. They currently compete in the IV liga Lesser Poland.

== Previous names ==
Glinik Gorlice has been known by many different names over time.

- 1922–1924 – RKS Siła Gorlice
- 1924–1945 – KS Karpatia Gorlice
- 1945–1948 – KS Orzeł Gorlice
- 1948–1952 – KS Związkowiec Gorlice
- 1952–1953 – KS Unia Gorlice
- 1953–1965 – MZKS Górnik Gorlice
- 1965–2001 – GKS Glinik Gorlice
- 2001–2009 – KS Glinik/Karpatia Gorlice
- 2009– – GKS Glinik Gorlice

== Honours ==
- Regional league Nowy Sącz
  - Champions: 2012–13
- Polish Cup
  - First round: 2005–06
- II liga
  - Runners-up: 1984-85
- IV liga
  - Runners-up: 2024-25

== Season to season ==
Season	Tier	Division	Place
2001–02	4	IV liga Lesser Poland (Nowy Sącz-Tarnów)	5th
2002–03	4	IV liga Lesser Poland (Nowy Sącz-Tarnów)	4th
2003–04	4	IV liga Lesser Poland (Nowy Sącz-Tarnów)	4th
2004–05	4	IV liga Lesser Poland (Nowy Sącz-Tarnów)	6th
2005–06	4	IV liga Lesser Poland (Nowy Sącz-Tarnów)	2nd
2006–07	4	IV liga Lesser Poland	7th
2007–08	4	IV liga Lesser Poland	5th
2008–09	4	III liga Lesser Poland-Świętokrzyskie	9th
2009–10	4	III liga Lesser Poland-Świętokrzyskie	17th
2010–11	5	IV liga Lesser Poland	15th
2011–12	6	Regional league Nowy Sącz	5th
2012–13	6	Regional league Nowy Sącz	1st
2013–14	5	IV liga Lesser Poland East	6th
2014–15	5	IV liga Lesser Poland East	11th
2015–16	5	IV liga Lesser Poland East	5th
2016–17	5	IV liga Lesser Poland East	12th
2017–18	5	IV liga Lesser Poland East	6th
2018–19	5	IV liga Lesser Poland East	8th
2019–20	5	IV liga Lesser Poland East	10th
2020–21	5	IV liga Lesser Poland East	8th
2021–22	5	IV liga Lesser Poland East	8th
2022–23	5	IV liga Lesser Poland	8th
2023–24	5	IV liga Lesser Poland	14th
2024–25	5	IV liga Lesser Poland	2nd
2025–26	5	IV liga Lesser Poland	4th

== Current squad ==
As of 1 January 2023

Note: Flags indicate national team as defined under FIFA eligibility rules; some limited exceptions apply. Players may hold more than one non-FIFA nationality.

No.	Pos.	Nation	Player
1	GK	POL	Przemysław Harwat
2	DF	POL	Piotr Martuszewski
3	DF	POL	Tomasz Rząca
4	MF	POL	Łukasz Krazysztoń
5	DF	POL	Krzysztof Dąbrowski
6	DF	POL	Jacek Myśliwy
7	DF	POL	David Drąg
8	MF	POL	Kacper Stój
9	FW	POL	Damian Śliwa
10	FW	POL	Daniel Kmak
11	MF	POL	Sebastian Buś
12	GK	POL	Jakub Matusik
13	MF	POL	Daniel Ogrodnik

No.	Pos.	Nation	Player
14	DF	POL	Przemysław Rąpała
15	FW	POL	Kacper Ostrowski
16	MF	POL	Tomasz Mituś
17	FW	POL	Sebastian Matuszyk
18	MF	POL	Mateusz Świechowski
19	MF	POL	Dawid Kulgia
20	MF	POL	Arkadiusz Juszczak
21	MF	POL	Aleksander Gazda
23	MF	POL	Kamil Gryboś
88	FW	POL	Kacper Piotrowski
94	FW	POL	Konrad Grela
98	MF	POL	Piotr Gogola
99	GK	POL	David Kubik
