= Stanisław Paździor =

Polish footballer

Personal information
- Date of birth: October 15, 1944
- Place of birth: Andrychów, Poland
- Date of death: March 28, 2018 (aged 73)
- Place of death: Wałbrzych, Poland
- Height: 1.84 m (6 ft 0 in)
- Position: Defender

Senior career*
Years	Team	Apps	(Gls)
1960–1962	Beskid Andrychów		
1963–1965	Cracovia	32	(0)
1965–1966	Lublinianka		
1966–1970	Górnik Wałbrzych		
1970–1976	Zagłębie Wałbrzych		
1976–1977	Górnik Wałbrzych		
- Connecticut Wildcats
- White Eagles Chicago
- Bridgenart
1979–1980	Górnik Wałbrzych		
- Zagłębie Lubin

International career
1972	Poland	1	(0)
- * Club domestic league appearances and goals

Stanisław Paździor (15 October 1944 – 28 March 2018) was a Polish footballer who played as a defender. He made one appearance for the Poland national team on 10 May 1972, a scoreless draw against Switzerland. His professional club career was mostly linked with the two Wałbrzych clubs; Górnik and Zagłębie.
