= Piaski Wielkie, Kraków =

Piaski Wielkie
- Neighbourhood
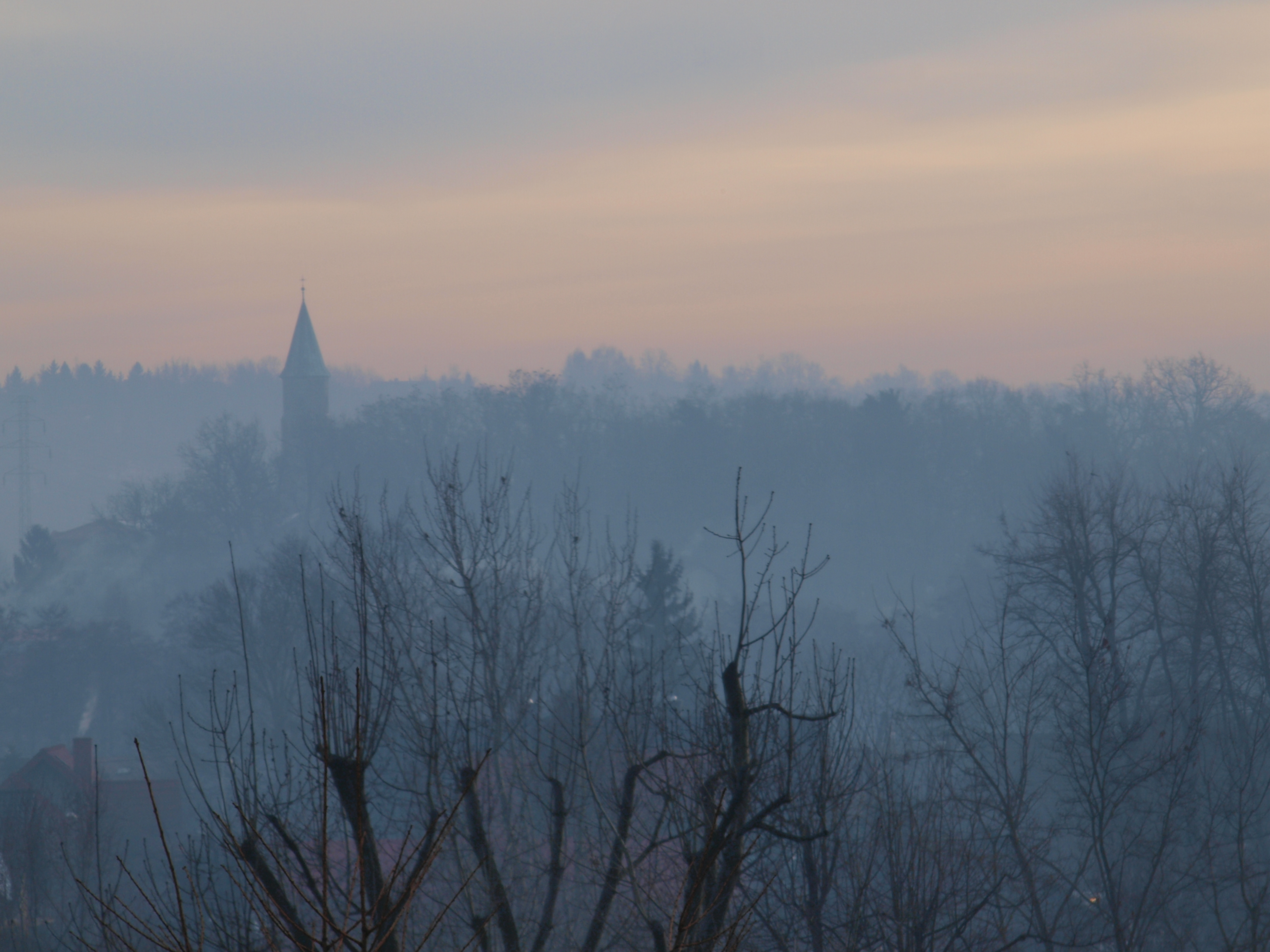
- View of Piaski Wielkie from Kozłówek
- Country: Poland
- Voivodeship: Lesser Poland
- City: Kraków
- City district: Podgórze Duchackie
- First mention: 1395
- Time zone: UTC+1 (CET)
  - Summer (DST): UTC+2 (CEST)
- Postal code: 30-XXX
- Telephone code: (+48) 12
- Vehicle registration: KR; KK

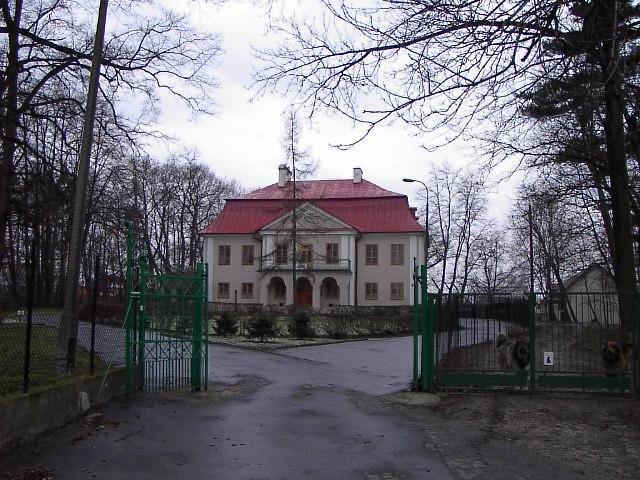
Classicist manor

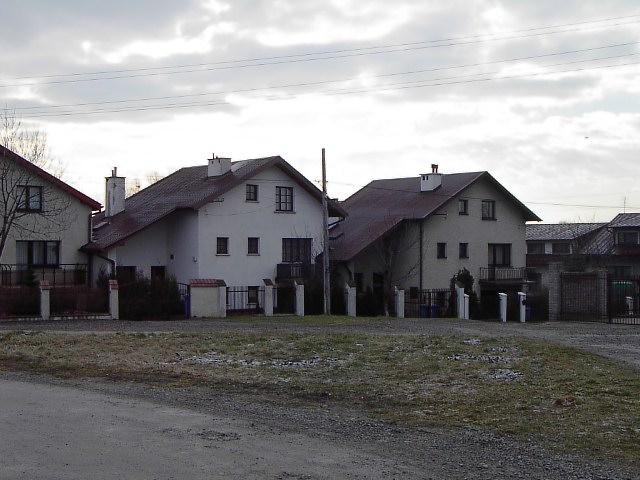
New single-family houses in Piaski Wielkie

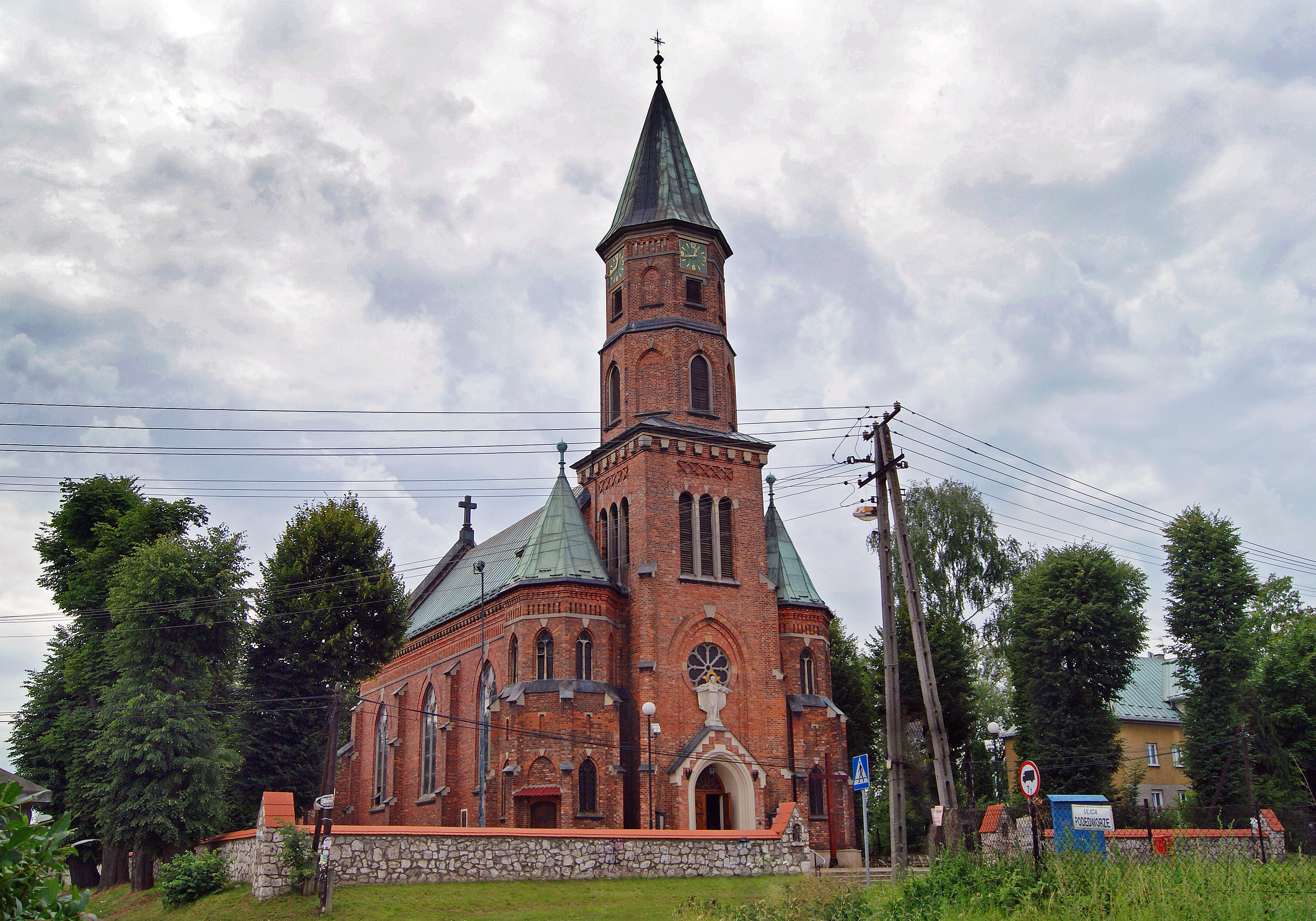
Parish Church of the Sacred Heart of Jesus

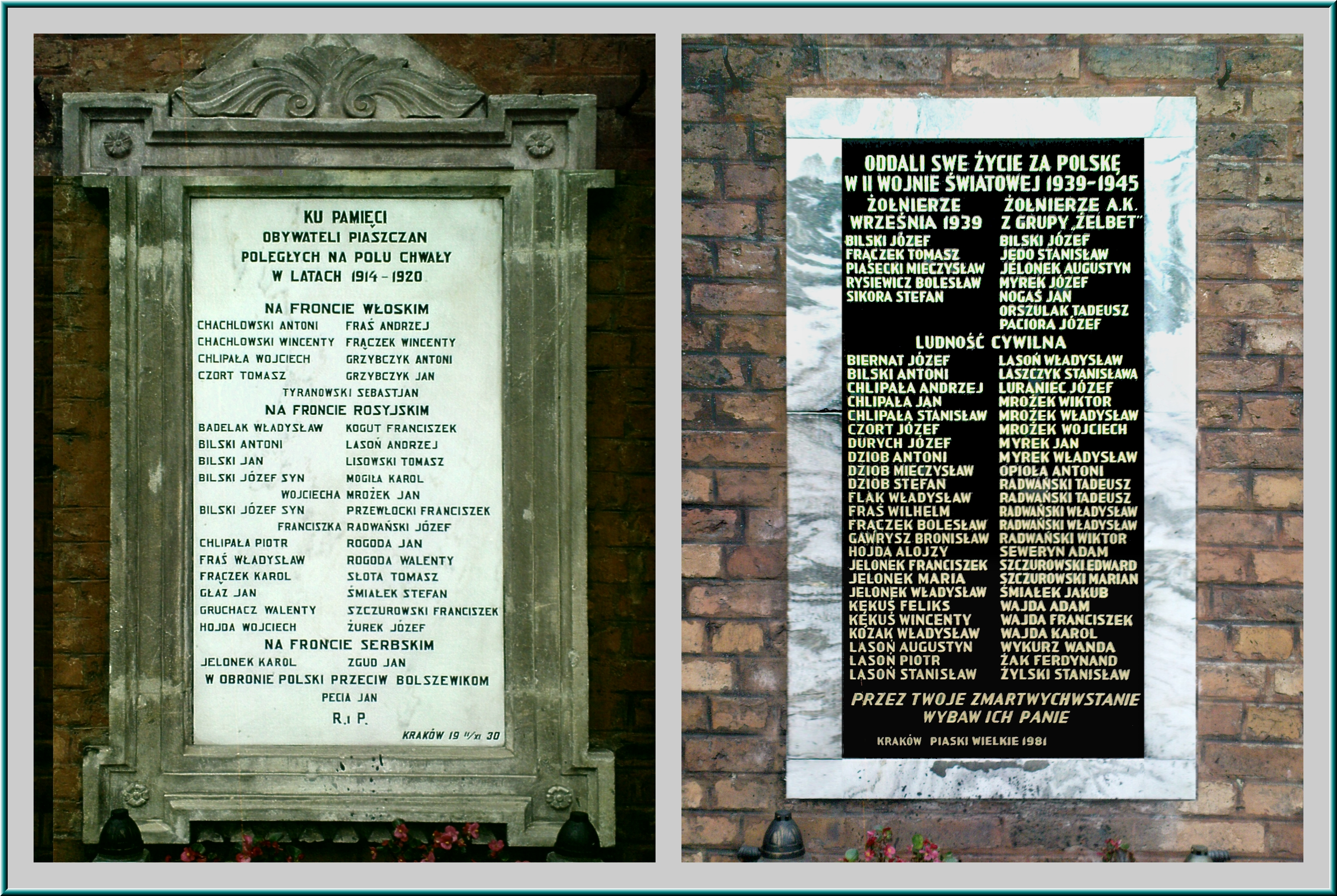
Commemorative plaques on the parish church, dedicated to the victims of World War I and II

Piaski Wielkie is an area of Kraków that is part of Podgórze Duchackie. It is former independent village whose inhabitants traditionally engaged in butchery and meat production. From 1934 until 1941, the settlement had its own gmina. Currently, it is a suburban area dominated by a mix of single-family detached homes and socialist realist estates.

== History ==
Piaski first appeared in documents in 1395, mentioned as Piasek. Initially, they belonged to the parish of Kosocice and were divided into Piaski Małe and Wielkie, later becoming one village. The inhabitants have been engaged in butchery and the production of meat and sausages since the Middle Ages. Taking advantage of the village's location on the route for driving herds of oxen from the south towards Silesia (bypassing Kraków), the inhabitants produced sausages, hams, and bacon seasoned with a special blend of herbs. They sold these products at markets in Kraków, which led to conflicts with the Kraków butchers' guild, to which the people of Piaski did not belong. The butchers from Piaski were called kijacy, from the long sticks they carried, used for carrying sausages, and also as weapons and a sign of belonging to the group of craftsmen. According to legend, the dispute between the sellers from Piaski Wielkie and Kraków was settled by King Kazimierz the Great, who granted the people of Piaski the right to trade in the city. In the 15th and 16th centuries, the kijacy also sold their products on Kazimierz, at Wolnica Square. By virtue of a privilege granted by King Stefan Batory, the kijacy of Piaski became official suppliers of meat to the royal court.

The craft traditions in Piaski Wielkie developed continuously until the 20th century, becoming a source of prosperity and development for the village. In the early 20th century, the butchers and meat processors of Piaski funded a church and a school. After 1989, the craft traditions in Piaski were revived, and today several enterprises operate here, producing high-quality meat products.

== Location ==
Piaski Wielkie is located about 7 km from the Main Market Square, in a south-eastern direction, bordering to the north with the Wola Duchacka housing estate and the Na Kozłówce housing estate, to the east with Rżąka, to the south with Kosocice and Rajsko, and to the west with Kurdwanów. It is situated on an elevation of 267 meters above sea level called "Czajna." The area of Piaski Wielkie covers about 400 hectares. In the north-western part of this area, on a 25-hectare site, an estate of blocks was built in the 1970s and 1980s, named Piaski Nowe. A tavern once stood on the site of today's church.

== Points of interest ==
- Neo-Gothic church under the invocation of the Sacred Heart of Jesus, built in 1923-27 according to the design of Z. Brzeziński
- Classicist manor, built in the 16th century, rebuilt at the end of the 19th century. Currently, it is used as the "Dwór Staropolski" hotel.
- Municipal Kindergarten No. 33, ul. Rżącka 1
- Monastery of the Sisters of the Capuchin Poor Clares, ul. Rżącka 15, including a parish cemetery

== Sports ==
In 1944, the sports club Orzeł Piaski Wielkie was founded, one of the founders was Rev. Franciszek Dźwigoński. The club was a training ground for the Żelbet Group of the National Army. The pitch was created on land belonging to the church.
