= Prokocim Kraków =

Polish football club

- Full name: Klub Sportowy Kolejarz-Prokocim Kraków
- Nickname(s): Kolejarze (The Railwaymen)
- Founded: 1921; 104 years ago
- Ground: Kolejarz Prokocim Sports Complex
- Chairman: Bogusław Bułat
- Manager: Grzegorz Burmer
- League: Regional league Kraków II
- 2023–24: Regional league Kraków II, 11th of 14
- Website: https://kskolejarzprokocim.pl
| Home colours | Away colours |

Prokocim Kraków (Klub Sportowy Kolejarz-Prokocim Kraków) is a Polish football club based in Bieżanów-Prokocim district of Kraków. They currently play in the Polish regional league, the seventh tier of the Polish football league.

== History ==
The history of the club dates back to 1921, when Franciszek Międzik and Adolf Furgalski organized a sports club called "Krakus" in the village of Prokocim near Krakow. The first colours of the club were pink shirts with green insets. In 1924 "KS Krakus" merged with "KS Orlątko" under the name "KS Świtezianka". In 1933 "KS Świtezianka", after the merger with "KS Orion", the name was changed to "KS Prokocim". In 1949, by virtue of a political decision of the Central Committee of the PZPR, the organizational system of Polish sport was changed, assigning new names to the existing clubs. And so KS Prokocim became "Kolejarz Prokocim" (EN: Railwayman Prokocim), and as the district's inhabitants mostly worked on the railroad, the name stuck and remained even after 1955 (when most clubs returned to their historical names).

Name chronology:

- 1921 – 1924 – Klub Sportowy Krakus
- 1924 – 1933 – Klub Sportowy Świtezianka (merger with KS Orlątko)
- 1933 – 1949 – Klub Sportowy Prokocim (merger with KS Orion)
- 1949 – 1955 – Klub Sportowy Kolejarz-Prokocim
- 1955–unknown– Kolejowy Klub Sportowy Prokocim
- unknown–present – Klub Sportowy Kolejarz-Prokocim

== Season to season ==
| Season | Tier | Division | Place |
|---|---|---|---|
| 1997–98 | 6 | Klasa A | 1st |
| 1998–99 | 5 | Regional league Kraków | 2nd |
| 1999–2000 | 5 | Regional league Kraków | 5th |
| 2000–01 | 5 | Regional league Kraków | 9th |
| 2001–02 | 5 | Regional league Kraków | 16th |
| 2002–03 | 6 | Klasa A Kraków II | 3rd |
| 2003–04 | 6 | Klasa A Kraków II | 5th |
| 2004–05 | 6 | Klasa A Kraków II | 4th |
| 2005–06 | 6 | Klasa A Kraków II | 12th |
| 2006–07 | 7 | Klasa A Kraków II | 5th |
| 2007–08 | 8 | Klasa A Kraków II | 5th |
| 2008–09 | 8 | Klasa A Kraków II | 14th |
| 2009–10 | 8 | Klasa A Kraków II | 5th |
| 2010–11 | 8 | Klasa A Kraków II | 10th |

| Season | Tier | Division | Place |
|---|---|---|---|
| 2011–12 | 7 | Klasa A Kraków II | 2nd |
| 2012–13 | 7 | Klasa A Kraków II | 1st |
| 2013–14 | 6 | Regional league Kraków II | 4th |
| 2014–15 | 6 | Regional league Kraków II | 4th |
| 2015–16 | 6 | Regional league Kraków II | 5th |
| 2016–17 | 6 | Regional league Kraków II | 2nd |
| 2017–18 | 6 | Regional league Kraków II | 4th |
| 2018–19 | 6 | Regional league Kraków II | 12th |
| 2019–20 | 6 | Regional league Kraków II | 4th |
| 2020–21 | 6 | Regional league Kraków II | 4th |
| 2021–22 | 6 | Regional league Kraków II | 6th |
| 2022–23 | 7 | Regional league Kraków II | 10th |
| 2023–24 | 7 | Regional league Kraków II | 11th |

- Sources: 1997–98 - 2000–01; 2001–02 - current season

- 15 seasons in regional league
  - 4 seasons in regional league Kraków
  - 11 seasons in regional league Kraków II
- 10 seasons in Klasa A

== Honours ==
- Klasa A: 1997–98, 2012–13

== Squad ==
As of 28 March 2021

Note: Flags indicate national team as defined under FIFA eligibility rules; some limited exceptions apply. Players may hold more than one non-FIFA nationality.

| No. | Pos. | Nation | Player |
|---|---|---|---|
| — | GK | (Poland) POL | Arkadiusz Hajduk |
| — | GK | (Poland) POL | Mateusz Czajka |
| — | GK | (Poland) POL | Olaf Żebrowski |
| — | GK | (Poland) POL | Amadeusz Baran |
| — | GK | (Poland) POL | Mateusz Kozak |
| — | GK | (Poland) POL | Piotr Jakubowski |
| — | GK | (Poland) POL | Paweł Sołtys |
| — | GK | (Poland) POL | Sebastian Reśko |
| — | DF | (Poland) POL | Patryk Stankiewicz |
| — | DF | (Poland) POL | Mateusz Łobodziński |
| — | DF | (Poland) POL | Piotr Sierant |
| — | DF | (Poland) POL | Jakub Bułat |
| — | DF | (Poland) POL | Dariusz Tomczuk |
| — | DF | (Poland) POL | Łukasz Wójcik |
| — | DF | (Poland) POL | Mikołaj Czechowski |
| — | DF | (Poland) POL | Rafał Kafel |
| — | DF | (Poland) POL | Michał Dolczak |

| No. | Pos. | Nation | Player |
|---|---|---|---|
| — | MF | (Poland) POL | Tomasz Wojdyła |
| — | MF | (Poland) POL | Kamil Wąsik |
| — | MF | (Argentina) ARG | Diego Alejandro Cavarra |
| — | MF | (Poland) POL | Michał Filarski |
| — | MF | (Poland) POL | Stanisław Kuklewicz |
| — | MF | (Poland) POL | Daniel Nowak |
| — | MF | (Poland) POL | Dawid Tomczuk |
| — | MF | (Poland) POL | Kacper Skałka |
| — | MF | (Poland) POL | Mikołaj Czechowski |
| — | MF | (Poland) POL | Kamil Rokosz |
| — | MF | (Poland) POL | Mateusz Sasak |
| — | MF | (Poland) POL | Przemysław Szczecina |
| — | MF | (Poland) POL | Mateusz Radwański |
| — | MF | (Poland) POL | Tomasz Grzegórzko |
| — | MF | (Poland) POL | Wiktor Rolski |
| — | MF | (Poland) POL | Paweł Bruzda |
| — | MF | (Poland) POL | Karol Sierant |

| No. | Pos. | Nation | Player |
|---|---|---|---|
| — | MF | (Poland) POL | Filip Jurecki |
| — | MF | (Poland) POL | Arkadiusz Fornalczyk |
| — | MF | (Poland) POL | Kamil Doros |
| — | MF | (Poland) POL | Dariusz Barcik |
| — | MF | (Poland) POL | Bartłomiej Tupta |
| — | MF | (Poland) POL | Jakub Maciąg |
| — | MF | (Poland) POL | Kamil Kucabiński |
| — | FW | (Poland) POL | Olszański Mateusz |
| — | FW | (Poland) POL | Dominik Kaczorowski |
| — | FW | (Poland) POL | Bartłomiej Cebula |
| — | FW | (Poland) POL | Patryk Wolanin |
| — | FW | (Poland) POL | Grzegorz Cebula |
| — | FW | (Poland) POL | Łukasz Wójcik |
| — | FW | (Poland) POL | Marcin Marut |
| — | FW | (Poland) POL | Sebastian Sapała |
