= Beskid Andrychów =

Football club in Poland

- Full name: Klub Sportowy Beskid Andrychów
- Founded: 1919; 107 years ago 2001; 25 years ago (refounded); 2007; 19 years ago (refounded)
- Ground: Municipal Stadium
- Capacity: 2,500
- Chairman: Grzegorz Gacur
- Manager: Tomasz Moskała
- League: IV liga Lesser Poland
- 2025–26: IV liga Lesser Poland, 2nd of 19
Home colours	Away colours

KS Beskid Andrychów is a Polish football club from, Andrychów, Lesser Poland. The club name is derived from the Beskid Mountains. They currently play in the IV liga Lesser Poland, the fifth tier of Polish league competition.

== History ==
The club was founded in 1919 under the name "KS Beskid Andrychów", as a multi-sports club. The club quickly changed its name to "KS Włókniarz Andrychów" whilst playing in the Kraków district league between 1951 and 1962. The following five seasons they played in the third tier. In the 1953–54 season, they reached the second round of the Polish Cup, beating Stilon Gorzów Wielkopolski 4–1 in the first before being narrowly edged out 4–1 in a penalty shoot-out after a 3–3 draw against Zagłębie Sosnowiec.

The club, which by 2001 already only had the football and volleyball sections left functioning, split and the football section changed its name to "TS Beskid Andrychów" whilst the volleyball section had been reformed as "MKS Andrychów". The club was in financial difficulties so on 14 December 2007, the board resigned, and it was re-founded under the name of "AKS Beskid Andrychów" under a new management, allowing the club to maintain its league position and continue the heritage of the "Beskid" name uninterrupted. The club spent the majority of the last two decades oscillating between the sixth, fifth and fourth tiers of Polish football.

== Notable players ==
Many locally born footballers started their professional careers at Beskid, most notably Mariusz Magiera who went on to become an Ekstraklasa regular and Polish internationals Stanisław Paździor and Adam Kokoszka.

== Fans ==
The club has a small but dedicated ultras group, Ultras Beskid, who are capable of presenting large tifos. On 27 April the fans travelled 265 km for a match against KSZO Ostrowiec Świętokrzyski, the furthest away game in the club's history. The fans have a friendship with fans of Energie Cottbus and also used to maintain good relations with Górnik Libiąż fans until 2011. Their biggest rival is Unia Oświęcim.

== Honours ==
- III liga
  - Eight place: 2012–13, 2013–14
- Polish Cup
  - Second round: 1953–54
- Polish Cup (Lesser Poland regionals)
  - Winners: 2024–25, 2025–26
- Polish Cup (Wadowice regionals)
  - Winners: 2014–15, 2019–20, 2020–21, 2022–23, 2023–24, 2024–25, 2025–26
