= Unia Tarnów (football) =

Polish football club

- Nickname: Klub Sportowy ZKS Unia Tarnów
- Founded: 30 September 1928; 98 years ago
- Ground: Jaskółcze Gniazdo Municipal Stadium
- Capacity: 16,000
- Chairman: Artur Szklarz
- Manager: Vacant
- League: IV liga Lesser Poland
- 2024–25: III liga, group IV, 18th of 18 (relegated)
- Website: https://zksuniatarnow.pl
Home colours	Away colours

Unia Tarnów is a Polish football club. They were founded in 1928 as a founding section of a multi-sports club.

They currently play in the IV liga Lesser Poland, the fifth tier of the Polish football league.

The biggest successes are the semi-finals and quarter-finals of the Polish Cup in the 1968–69 and 1970–71 season, respectively.
