= Swoszowice, Kraków =

Swoszowice
- Dzielnica of Kraków
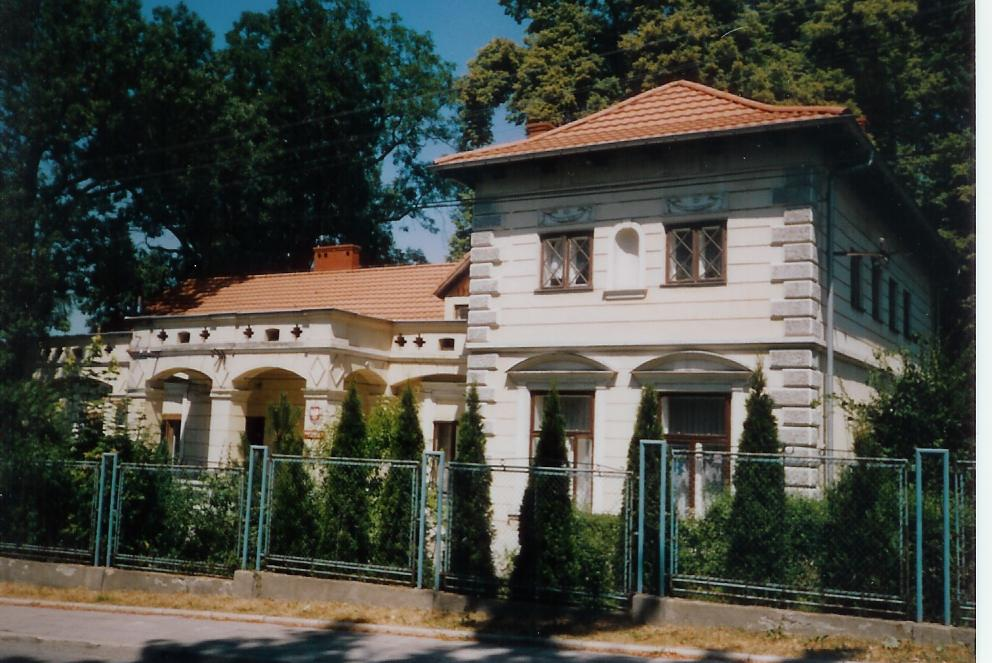

- Location of Swoszowice within Kraków
- Coordinates: 49°59′10.96″N 19°57′24.73″E
- Country: Poland
- Voivodeship: Lesser Poland
- County/City: Kraków

Government
  - President: Maciej Nazimek

Area
  - Total: 25.6 km^{2} (9.9 sq mi)

Population (2014)
  - Total: 25,608
  - Density: 1,000/km^{2} (2,590/sq mi)
- Time zone: UTC+1 (CET)
  - Summer (DST): UTC+2 (CEST)
- Area code: +48 12
- Website: http://www.dzielnica10.krakow.pl

Swoszowice is one of 18 districts of Kraków, located in the southern part of the city. The name Swoszowice comes from a village of same name that is now a part of the district.

According to the Central Statistical Office data, the district's area is 25.6 square kilometres (9.88 square miles) and 25 608 people inhabit Swoszowice.

== Subdivisions of Swoszowice ==
Swoszowice is divided into smaller subdivisions (osiedles). Here's a list of them.

- Bania
- Barycz
- Jugowice
- Kliny Borkowskie
- Kosocice
- Lusina
- Łysa Góra
- Opatkowice
- Rajsko
- Siarczana Góra
- Soboniowice
- Swoszowice
- Wróblowice
- Zbydniowice
