= Lubań Maniowy =

Polish football club

- Full name: Ludowy Klub Sportowy Lubań Maniowy
- Founded: 1948; 77 years ago
- Ground: Stadion Sportowy Wolski
- Capacity: 500
- Chairman: Adam Bańka
- Manager: Łukasz Schreiner
- League: IV liga Lesser Poland
- 2023–24: IV liga Lesser Poland, 7th of 19
Home colours	Away colours

Lubań Maniowy (LKS Lubań Maniowy) is a Polish football club based in Maniowy, Nowy Targ County. They currently play in the IV liga Lesser Poland, the fifth tier of the Polish football league.

== History ==
In 1947, the initiative was to establish a Popular Sports Team (LZS) in Maniowy. The first matches were held in July 1948, to which the establishment of the club is dated back. In the same year, the football team started playing in the district league.

In addition to the football section, there were also ski and hockey sections, where the latter is defunct today.

As for the football section, the best times were in the 1980s and modern times. In the 80's the club was in the then fourth tier (Liga okręgowa) and got close to getting to the third division. To further develop, a large sports ground with surrounding facilities was built. The official opening of the grounds took place on 27 July 1986, when a match against Bór Dębno was played. The hosts won 3–2.

In 2001, the team was promoted to IV Liga, then the fourth tier of the Polish football league.

After ten years, with the finish of the 2010–11 season, the club was promoted to the coveted third league, the new fourth tier.

With finishing 14th from 16 teams in the 2012–13 season of the III liga, the club was relegated back to the IV Liga, the fifth tier, where they have stayed since.

== Squad ==
As of 29 March 2021

Note: Flags indicate national team as defined under FIFA eligibility rules; some limited exceptions apply. Players may hold more than one non-FIFA nationality.

No.	Pos.	Nation	Player
—		(Poland) POL	Bartłomiej Augustyn
—		(Poland) POL	Dawid Budz
—	MF	(Poland) POL	Daniel Duda
—	MF	(Poland) POL	Patryk Duda
—		(Poland) POL	Jakub Dziedzic
—		(Poland) POL	Damian Firek
—		(Poland) POL	Dominik Gorlicki
—		(Poland) POL	Maciej Gorlicki
—		(Poland) POL	Rafał Hagowski
—	MF	(Poland) POL	Mirosław Jandura
—		(Poland) POL	Dominik Jazgar

No.	Pos.	Nation	Player
—		(Poland) POL	Jakub Kasperczyk
—		(Poland) POL	Daniel Noworolnik
—		(Italy) ITA	Simon Offei Gyimaha
—	MF	(Brazil) BRA	Marcio da Silva
—		(Poland) POL	Mateusz Pluta
—		(Poland) POL	Jakub Sikora
—		(Poland) POL	Marek Sikora
—		(Poland) POL	David Sydorchuk
—	DF	(Poland) POL	Michał Szeliga
—	GK	(Poland) POL	Artur Świerad
—		(Poland) POL	Arkadiusz Zawiślan
