= Skawinka Skawina =

Polish football club

- Full name: Terenowy Klub Sportowy; Skawinka Skawina
- Founded: 1922; 104 years ago
- Ground: Municipal Stadium
- Capacity: 500
- Chairman: Damian Nowaczyk
- Manager: Mateusz Farbaniec
- League: Klasa A Kraków II
- 2023–24: Regional league Kraków II, 12th of 14 (relegated)
- Website: https://skawinka1922.futbolowo.pl/
Home colours	Away colours

Skawinka Skawina (TKS Skawinka Skawina) was a Polish football club based in Skawina. They used to play in the Klasa A, the eighth tier of the Polish football league system.

== History ==
The beginnings of the club dated back to 1918, when two Kraków students, Stanisław Madej and FranciszekLisowski, tried to train football in the city of Skawina. Due to numerous failures, the issue of establishing the club was suspended for several years. It was only at the beginning of 1921 that a few football enthusiasts wanted to change this state of affairs. It was then that a clubhouse and a sports field were arranged. A request was also submitted to the KOZPN to accept the team as a member, and the club was officially founded 1922 by obtaining the membership. On 10 May 1925, the Skawinka ground was opened.

== Current squad ==
As of 29 March 2021

Note: Flags indicate national team as defined under FIFA eligibility rules; some limited exceptions apply. Players may hold more than one non-FIFA nationality.

No.	Pos.	Nation	Player
—	GK	POL	Michał Walachnia
—	GK	POL	Daniel Możuch
—	DF	POL	Marcin Curzydło
—	DF	POL	Paweł Czajka (player-coach)
—	DF	POL	Krzysztof Banach
—	DF	POL	Rafał Sowa
—	DF	POL	Jerzy Anton
—	DF	POL	Konrad Oleś
—	DF	POL	Paweł Marczyk
—	MF	POL	Jakub Kaganek
—	MF	POL	Tomasz Grzesiak

No.	Pos.	Nation	Player
—	MF	POL	Banjamin Jeż
—	MF	POL	Krzysztof Pachacz
—	MF	POL	Jakub Piekarski
—	MF	POL	Karol Stokłosa
—	MF	POL	Mateusz Przebinda
—	MF	POL	Rafał Śliwa
—	MF	POL	Przemysław Konik
—	FW	POL	Paweł Grzesiak
—	FW	POL	Rafał Piszczek
—	FW	POL	Kewin Wąsiołek
