= Clepardia Kraków =

Polish football club

- Full name: Klub Sportowy Clepardia Kraków
- Founded: 1909
- Ground: Fieldorfa Nila 5 Street, Kraków
- Capacity: 435
- Chairman: Zbigniew Wajda
- Manager: Krzysztof Król
- League: IV liga Lesser Poland
- 2019/20: IV liga Lesser Poland, 12th
Home colours	Away colours

Clepardia Kraków (KS Clepardia Kraków) is a Polish football club based in Prądnik Biały district of Kraków. They currently play in the IV Liga, the fifth tier of the Polish football league.

== History ==
The "Krowodrza – Modrzejówka" Sports Society was founded in 1909 as one of the earliest clubs in Kraków. Initially, its ground was located on Lubelska Street, next to a military hospital, and later on the premises of the current military unit on Wrocławska Street.

The "Prądnicki" Sports Club was established in 1930 as "KS Prądnik". Its operation was interrupted by World War II, and it was reactivated in 1955. Since 1956, the club's football ground was at Prądnicka Street.

In 1967, after the merger of the two clubs, the Inter-Factory District Sports Club "Clepardia"' was established.

Over the years, the club had sport sections of football, handball, judo. Currently, the football sections (at all age levels) and judo are functioning.

== Squad ==
As of 29 March 2021

Note: Flags indicate national team as defined under FIFA eligibility rules; some limited exceptions apply. Players may hold more than one non-FIFA nationality.

No.	Pos.	Nation	Player
—	GK	(Poland) POL	Grzegorz Fundament
—	GK	(Poland) POL	Tadeusz Sajdak
—	GK	(Poland) POL	Grzegorz Murzański
—	DF	(Poland) POL	Krzysztof Gamula
—	DF	(Poland) POL	Piotr Bąk
—	DF	(Poland) POL	Jan Czerlunczakiewicz
—	DF	(Poland) POL	Damian Matyja
—	DF	(Poland) POL	Piotr Martuszewski
—	DF	(Poland) POL	Macej Bosak
—	DF	(Poland) POL	Kamil Kupiec
—	MF	(Poland) POL	Dominik Mączyński
—	MF	(Poland) POL	Łukasz Próchno

No.	Pos.	Nation	Player
—	MF	(Poland) POL	Marcin Czech
—	MF	(Poland) POL	Mateusz Mroczka
—	MF	(Poland) POL	Krzysztof Sadowski
—	MF	(Poland) POL	Patryk Sajdak
—	MF	(Poland) POL	Mateusz Przesławski
—	MF	(Poland) POL	Kamil Foltman
—	MF	(Poland) POL	Maksymilian Czekaj
—	FW	(Poland) POL	Mateusz Błasiak
—	FW	(Poland) POL	Jakub Kostuj
—	FW	(Poland) POL	Jarosław Kania
—	FW	(Poland) POL	Andrzej Kawa
—	FW	(Poland) POL	Paweł Michalski

Trener:

== Current coaching staff ==
First Coach	(Poland) Krzysztof Król
Second Coach	(Poland) Dariusz Puchala
