= Podgórze Duchackie =

- Dzielnica of Kraków
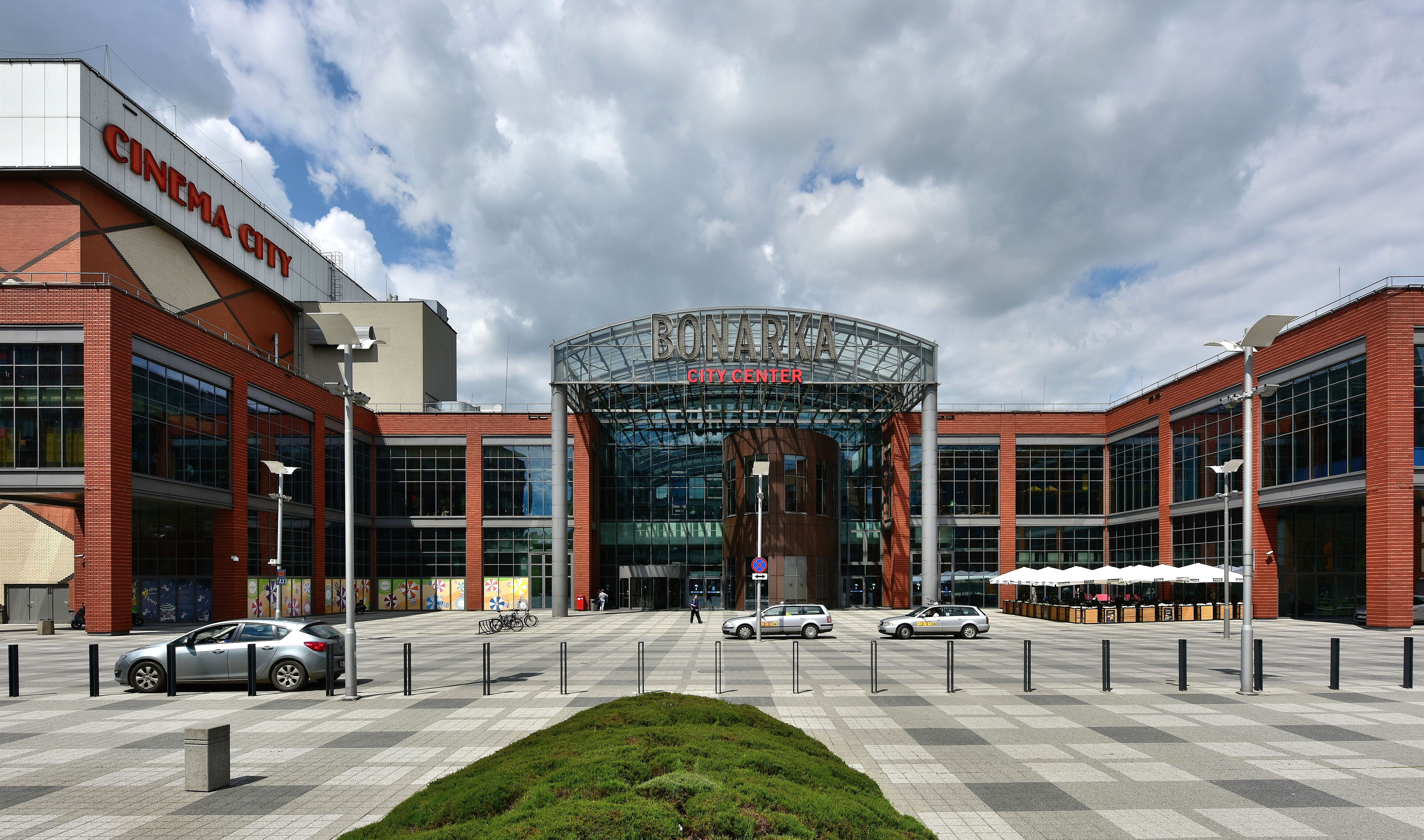
- Bonarka City Center

- Location of Podgórze Duchackie within Kraków
- Coordinates: 50°0′44.2″N 19°57′50.65″E
- Country: Poland
- Voivodeship: Lesser Poland
- County/City: Kraków

Government
  - President: Krzysztof Sułowski

Area
  - Total: 9.54 km^{2} (3.68 sq mi)

Population (2014)
  - Total: 52,859
  - Density: 5,540/km^{2} (14,400/sq mi)
- Time zone: UTC+1 (CET)
  - Summer (DST): UTC+2 (CEST)
- Area code: +48 12
- Website: http://www.dzielnica11.krakow.pl

Podgórze Duchackie is one of 18 districts of Kraków, located in the southern part of the city. The name Podgórze Duchackie comes from two villages that are now parts of the district.

According to the Central Statistical Office data, the district's area is 9.54 square kilometres (3.68 square miles) and 52 859 people inhabit Podgórze Duchackie.

== Subdivisions of Podgórze Duchackie ==
Podgórze Duchackie is divided into smaller subdivisions (osiedles). Here's a list of them.

- Kurdwanów
  - Kurdwanów Nowy
- Osiedle Piaski Nowe
- Osiedle Podlesie
- Piaski Wielkie
- Wola Duchacka
  - Wola Duchacka East
  - Wola Duchacka West
