= Dalin Myślenice =

- Full name: Klub Sportowy Dalin Myślenice
- Founded: 1921; 104 years ago
- Ground: Municipal Stadium
- Capacity: 2,000
- Chairman: Tomasz Bargiel
- Manager: Przemysław Senderski
- League: IV liga Lesser Poland
- 2024–25: IV liga Lesser Poland, 8th of 19
- Website: https://www.dalinmyslenice.pl

Dalin Myślenice is a Polish sports club based in Myślenice with association football and wrestling sections. The football team currently competes in the IV liga Lesser Poland, the fifth tier of Polish league system.

The men's senior football team played for many years in the third national tier.

The volleyball sections split to firm a separate legal entity, but retained the original name. The women's volleyball team used to play in the top national division after gaining promotion by winning the second division in 2004.
