= IV liga Lesser Poland =

- Organising body: Lesser Poland; Football Association
- Founded: 2000; 26 years ago
- Country: Poland
- Number of clubs: 19
- Level on pyramid: 5
- Promotion to: III liga, group IV
- Relegation to: V liga Lesser Poland I V liga Lesser Poland II
- Current champions: Wieczysta Kraków II (2025–26)
- Sponsor(s): Texom

IV liga Lesser Poland group (grupa małopolska), also known as Texom IV liga małopolska for sponsorship reasons, is one of the groups of IV liga, the fifth level of Polish football league system. The league was created in the 2000–01 season after a new administrative division of Poland was introduced. Until the end of the 2007–08 season, IV liga was the fourth tier of league competition in Poland, but this was changed with the formation of the Ekstraklasa as the top level league in Poland.

The clubs from Lesser Poland Voivodeship compete in this group. The winner of the league is promoted to III liga, group IV. The bottom teams are relegated to the one of two Lesser Poland groups of the V liga.

== Season 2020–21 ==
The 2020–21 season kicked of 8 August 2020 in two groups: Wschód (east) and Zachód (west). One team was promoted to III liga, the winner of the play-offs between the champions of the eastern and western group. After the end of the 2020–21 season, the number of teams relegated from a given group of the league will dependent on the number of promoted teams from territoriality appropriate groups of Liga Okręgowa (4 to each group of the IV Liga) and the relegated teams from the III liga, so each group in IV Liga in the 2021–22 season consisted of 18 teams.

For the 2020–21 season, the official sponsor of the IV Liga and lower leagues was KEEZA. It is a brand of sportswear, with clubs receiving vouchers for these products, most of them symbolic. Fourth league clubs were supported with a voucher of 1500 PLN, teams from Liga Okręgowa 1000 PLN, teams from Klasa A - 500 PLN, and teams from Klasa B and C - 300 PLN. Additionally, all clubs were entitled to a 50% discount on KEEZA products, calculated on the list prices. As part of the agreement, the leagues' official names were named as following:

- „KEEZA” IV liga
- „KEEZA” Klasa okręgowa
- „KEEZA” Klasa A
- „KEEZA” Klasa B
- „KEEZA” Klasa C

=== "Keeza" IV liga (group: Lesser Poland - East) ===
Locations of the 2020–21 IV liga (group: Lesser Poland - East) clubs

==== League table ====
Pos	Team	Pld	W	D	L	GF	GA	GD	Pts	Promotion
1	Lubań Maniowy	15	12	2	1	38	19	+19	38	Qualification to Promotion play-offs
2	Unia Tarnów	16	12	0	4	54	21	+33	36	
3	Wierchy Rabka Zdrój	15	10	4	1	27	11	+16	34	
4	Poprad Muszyna	15	11	1	3	43	16	+27	34	
5	Limanovia Limanowa	15	11	1	3	36	11	+25	34	
6	Bruk-Bet Termalica Nieciecza II	15	10	2	3	49	23	+26	32	
7	Sokół Słopnice	15	9	2	4	44	27	+17	29	
8	Wolania Wola Rzędzińska	15	8	3	4	28	16	+12	27	
9	Glinik Gorlice	15	7	4	4	26	20	+6	25	
10	Tarnovia Tarnów	15	6	1	8	26	28	−2	19	
11	Metal Tarnów	15	5	4	6	20	25	−5	19	
12	Orkan Szczyrzyc	16	5	3	8	22	28	−6	18	
13	GKS Drwinia	15	5	2	8	15	25	−10	17	
14	Skalnik Kamionka Wielka	15	5	2	8	20	30	−10	17	
15	Bocheński KS	16	4	2	10	22	34	−12	14	
16	Watra Białka Tatrzańska	15	4	1	10	17	27	−10	13	
17	Okocimski KS Brzesko	15	3	1	11	22	41	−19	10	
18	Rylovia Rylowa	15	3	1	11	13	49	−36	10	
19	Poprad Rytro	17	1	4	12	15	53	−38	7	
20	Barciczanka Barcice	16	2	0	14	13	46	−33	6	

Updated to match(es) played on 12 March 2021. Source:
Rules for classification: 1. Number of points reached in the entire series of games; 2. Number of points reached in direct matches; 3. Goal difference in direct matches; 4. Goal difference in direct matches – away goals counted twice; 5. Goal difference in the whole series of games; 6. Number of goals scored in the entire series of games.

=== "Keeza" IV liga (group: Lesser Poland - West) ===
Locations of the 2020–21 IV liga (group: Lesser Poland - West) clubs

==== League table ====
Pos	Team	Pld	W	D	L	GF	GA	GD	Pts	Promotion
1	Wiślanie Skawina	13	10	2	1	46	8	+38	32	Qualification to Promotion play-offs
2	Orzeł Ryczów	13	9	2	2	27	13	+14	29	
3	Beskid Andrychów	13	8	2	3	26	17	+9	26	
4	Dalin Myślenice	13	8	2	3	28	19	+9	26	
5	Sokół Kocmyrzów Baranówka	14	7	4	3	30	14	+16	25	
6	Unia Oświęcim	13	6	3	4	24	19	+5	21	
7	LKS Jawiszowice	13	6	3	4	28	24	+4	21	
8	MKS Trzebinia	13	6	3	4	25	21	+4	21	
9	Pcimianka Pcim	13	6	3	4	23	15	+8	21	
10	KS Chełmek	14	6	2	6	28	20	+8	20	
11	LKS Śledziejowice	13	5	2	6	25	35	−10	17	
12	Orzeł Piaski Wielkie (Kraków)	13	5	2	6	14	24	−10	17	
13	Węgrzcanka Węgrzce Wielkie	13	5	2	6	18	29	−11	17	
14	Clepardia Kraków	13	4	4	5	26	23	+3	16	
15	Garbarnia Kraków II	14	3	4	7	19	27	−8	13	
16	Strażak Rajsko	13	3	3	7	16	29	−13	12	
17	Słomniczanka Słomniki	13	3	1	9	15	30	−15	10	
18	Puszcza Niepołomice II	14	2	2	10	14	36	−22	8	
19	Proszowianka Proszowice	14	0	2	12	9	38	−29	2	

Updated to match(es) played on 29 March 2021. Source:
Rules for classification: 1. Number of points reached in the entire series of games; 2. Number of points reached in direct matches; 3. Goal difference in direct matches; 4. Goal difference in direct matches – away goals counted twice; 5. Goal difference in the whole series of games; 6. Number of goals scored in the entire series of games.

== Season 2019–20 ==
Due to the COVID-19 pandemic, the season did not restart after the winter break. The Promotion play-offs did go ahead between the first placed teams from the East and West groups, Unia Tarnów and Cracovia II. Eventually Cracovia II was promoted to III liga with a 5-1 aggregate score over Unia Tarnów.

=== IV liga (group: Lesser Poland - East) ===
Locations of the 2020–21 IV liga (group: Lesser Poland - East) clubs

==== League table ====
Pos	Team	Pld	W	D	L	GF	GA	GD	Pts	Promotion
1	Unia Tarnów	16	11	3	2	42	17	+25	36	Qualification to Promotion play-offs
2	Wolania Wola Rzędzińska	16	10	2	4	35	23	+12	32	
3	Poprad Muszyna	16	9	5	2	35	17	+18	32	
4	Sandecja Nowy Sącz II	16	10	1	5	40	16	+24	31	
5	Lubań Maniowy	16	9	2	5	30	21	+9	29	
6	Limanovia Limanowa	16	9	2	5	32	25	+7	29	
7	Bruk-Bet Termalica Nieciecza II	16	9	2	5	32	22	+10	29	
8	Bocheński KS	16	7	4	5	31	27	+4	25	
9	Wierchy Rabka Zdrój	16	7	3	6	23	20	+3	24	
10	Glinik Gorlice	16	7	2	7	21	20	+1	23	
11	GKS Drwinia	16	6	2	8	23	25	−2	20	
12	Tarnovia Tarnów	16	6	1	9	25	31	−6	19	
13	Orkan Szczyrzyc	16	4	2	10	17	39	−22	14	
14	Okocimski KS Brzesko	16	4	2	10	13	30	−17	14	
15	Poprad Rytro	16	3	2	11	14	35	−21	11	
16	Watra Białka Tatrzańska	15	3	1	11	17	39	−22	10	
17	Barciczanka Barcice	15	2	2	11	13	36	−23	8	

Updated to match(es) played on 9 November 2020. Source:
Rules for classification: 1. Number of points reached in the entire series of games; 2. Number of points reached in direct matches; 3. Goal difference in direct matches; 4. Goal difference in direct matches – away goals counted twice; 5. Goal difference in the whole series of games; 6. Number of goals scored in the entire series of games.

=== IV liga (group: Lesser Poland - West) ===
Locations of the 2019–20 IV liga (group: Lesser Poland - West) clubs
* Wiślanie Skawina and Skawinka Skawina share the same ground.

==== League table ====
Pos	Team	Pld	W	D	L	GF	GA	GD	Pts	Promotion
1	Cracovia II	17	13	2	2	50	13	+37	41	Qualification to Promotion play-offs
2	Wiślanie Skawina	17	12	3	2	39	16	+23	39	
3	Wisła Kraków II	17	12	0	5	38	20	+18	36	
4	Pcimianka Pcim	17	11	2	4	34	22	+12	35	
5	Orzeł Ryczów	17	8	4	5	32	24	+8	28	
6	Dalin Myślenice	17	7	7	3	38	17	+21	28	
7	Słomniczanka Słomniki	17	8	4	5	28	29	−1	28	
8	Orzeł Piaski Wielkie (Kraków)	17	8	3	6	35	32	+3	27	
9	Beskid Andrychów	17	7	5	5	31	22	+9	26	
10	MKS Trzebinia	17	6	6	5	23	19	+4	24	
11	Unia Oświęcim	17	6	3	8	28	31	−3	21	
12	Clepardia Kraków	17	6	2	9	26	40	−14	20	
13	Strażak Rajsko	17	5	2	10	24	39	−15	17	
14	Czarni Staniątki	17	5	1	11	21	33	−12	16	
15	LKS Jawiszowice	17	4	2	11	29	51	−22	14	
16	Węgrzcanka Węgrzce Wielkie	17	2	5	10	15	34	−19	11	
17	Sokół Kocmyrzów Baranówka	17	3	2	12	25	39	−14	11	
18	Skawinka Skawina	17	3	1	13	13	48	−35	10	Relegation to Liga okręgowa

Updated to match(es) played on 15 March 2020. Source:
Rules for classification: 1. Number of points reached in the entire series of games; 2. Number of points reached in direct matches; 3. Goal difference in direct matches; 4. Goal difference in direct matches – away goals counted twice; 5. Goal difference in the whole series of games; 6. Number of goals scored in the entire series of games.

=== Promotion play-offs ===
A two match play-off was held between the first placed teams of the "East" and "West" group, Unia Tarnów and Cracovia II. The winner of the play-offs would win promotion to III liga.

8 July 2020
17:00 CET (UTC+1)

Unia Tarnów	1–1	Cracovia II
Kacper Ostrowski 8'	Report	Tomáš Vestenický 88'

Stadion Miejski Jaskółcze Gniazdo, Tarnów
Attendance: 800
Referee: Przemysław Greń
12 July 2020
17:00 CET (UTC+1)

Cracovia II	4–0	Unia Tarnów
Michał Rakoczy 7'; Tomáš Vestenický 36', 45'; Mateusz Nowak 62' (o.g.)	Report

Cracovia Training Ground, Kraków
Attendance: 150
Referee: Konrad Kolak
