= 2020–21 Widzew Łódź season =

Widzew Łódź
2020-21 season
- Chairman: Martyna Pajączek
- Manager: Enkeleid Dobi (sacked) → Marcin Broniszewski
- Stadium: Stadion Miejski Widzewa
- I liga: 9th
- Polish Cup: Round of 32
Home colours	Away colours	Third colours

The 2020–21 Widzew Łódź season was the club's first season back in I liga since promotion from II liga in 2020. They competed in the season's Polish Cup edition, where they were eliminated by Legia Warsaw, following the 0–1 defeat in the round of 32.

== Players ==
As of 5 October 2020

Note: Flags indicate national team as defined under FIFA eligibility rules; some limited exceptions apply. Players may hold more than one non-FIFA nationality.

No.	Pos.	Nation	Player
1	GK	POL	Miłosz Mleczko (on loan from Lech Poznań)
2	DF	POL	Michał Grudniewski
3	DF	POL	Filip Becht
4	DF	POL	Sebastian Rudol
7	MF	EST	Henrik Ojamaa
9	FW	POL	Marcin Robak
15	DF	POL	Krystian Nowak
16	MF	POL	Bartłomiej Poczobut
17	FW	POL	Robert Prochownik
18	MF	POL	Daniel Mąka
19	MF	POL	Patryk Mucha
22	MF	POL	Dominik Kun

No.	Pos.	Nation	Player
23	DF	POL	Łukasz Kosakiewicz
24	GK	POL	Wojciech Pawłowski
27	DF	POL	Daniel Tanżyna
29	MF	POL	Michael Ameyaw
30	MF	POL	Mateusz Możdżeń
33	DF	CRO	Petar Mikulić
68	FW	POL	Karol Czubak
69	GK	POL	Konrad Reszka
70	MF	COD	Merveille Fundambu
77	MF	POL	Mateusz Michalski
93	FW	POL	Przemysław Kita
95	DF	POL	Patryk Stępiński

== Friendlies ==
In January 2021, Widzew Łódź faced Warta Poznań (1–3 defeat), Polonia Warsaw (2–1 victory) and Sokół Aleksandrów Łódzki (2–0 victory).

== Transfers ==
=== Summer window ===
- In: Michael Ameyaw (Bytovia Bytów), Karol Czubak (Bytovia Bytów), Merveille Fundambu (KTS Weszło Warsaw), Michał Grudniewski (Radomiak Radom), Jakub Kmita (reserve team), Dominik Kun (Sandecja Nowy Sącz), Mateusz Michalski (Radomiak Radom), Petar Mikulić (NK Croatia Zmijavci), Miłosz Mleczko (Lech Poznań, loan), Patryk Mucha (Górnik Polkowice), Konrad Reszka (reserve team), Damian Skrzeczkowski (reserve team), Patryk Stępiński (Warta Poznań)
- Out: Marcel Gąsior (Korona Kielce), Konrad Gutowski (Podbeskidzie Bielsko-Biała), Kornel Kordas (Korona Kielce), Christopher Mandiangu (Vllaznia Shkodër), Kamil Piskorski (Pomorzanin Toruń), Adam Radwański (Bruk-Bet Termalica Nieciecza), Łukasz Turzyniecki (Zagłębie Sosnowiec), Patryk Wolański (Sokół Lutomiersk), Rafał Wolsztyński (Arka Gdynia), Hubert Wołąkiewicz (free agent)

=== Winter window ===
- In: Caique Dias da Cruz (Olimpia Grudziądz), Kacper Gach (Podbeskidzie Bielsko-Biała), Marek Hanousek (MFK Karviná), Vjačeslavs Kudrjavcevs (Stomil Olsztyn), Piotr Samiec-Talar (Śląsk Wrocław), Paweł Tomczyk (Stal Mielec), Jakub Wrąbel (Wisła Płock)
- Out: Daniel Mąka (reserve team), Henrik Ojamaa (Flora Tallinn), Wojciech Pawłowski (reserve team), Marcel Pięczek (Puszcza Niepołomice), Robert Prochownik (Sandecja Nowy Sącz)

== Competitions ==
=== I liga ===
==== Standings ====
Pos	Team	Pld	W	D	L	GF	GA	GD	Pts
7	Miedź Legnica	34	13	12	9	49	36	+13	51
8	Odra Opole	34	13	10	11	35	41	−6	49
9	Widzew Łódź	34	11	13	10	30	36	−6	46
10	Sandecja Nowy Sącz	34	12	9	13	42	50	−8	45
11	Chrobry Głogów	34	12	8	14	34	45	−11	44

Updated to match(es) played on 3 June 2021. Source: 1liga.org, 90minut.pl
Rules for classification: 1) Points; 2) Head-to-head points; 3) Head-to-head goal difference; 4) Head-to-head away goals scored (only if two teams); 5) Goal difference; 6) Goals scored; 7) Games won; 8) Away games won; 9) PZPN draw.

==== Matches ====
29 August 2020 1	Radomiak Radom	4–1	Widzew Łódź	Pruszków
12:40				Attendance: 185

16 September 2020 2	Widzew Łódź	0–2	ŁKS Łódź	Łódź
19:10				Stadium: Stadion Miejski Widzewa; Attendance: 5600

10 September 2020 3	Chrobry Głogów	3–0	Widzew Łódź	Głogów
20:30				Attendance: 1055

19 September 2020 4	Widzew Łódź	2–0	Stomil Olsztyn	Łódź
12:40				Attendance: 5580; Referee: Stadion Miejski Widzewa

29 August 2020 5	GKS Jastrzębie	0–1	Widzew Łódź	Łódź
17:40				Stadium: Stadion Miejski Widzewa; Attendance: 8750

29 September 2020 6	Widzew Łódź	1–1	Zagłębie Sosnowiec	Łódź
18:10				Stadium: Stadion Miejski Widzewa; Attendance: 8500

4 October 2020 7	Puszcza Niepołomice	1–0	Zagłębie Sosnowiec	Niepołomice
12:40				Attendance: 793

9 October 2020 8	Widzew Łódź	2–1	Sandecja Nowy Sącz	Łódź
17:40				Stadium: Stadion Miejski Widzewa; Attendance: 8447

17 October 2020 9	Górnik Łęczna	0–0	Widzew Łódź	Łęczna
12:40				Attendance: 0

10 November 2020 10	Widzew Łódź	0–0	GKS Bełchatów	Łódź
18:00				Stadium: Stadion Miejski Widzewa; Attendance: 0

6 November 2020 11	Miedź Legnica	1–1	Widzew Łódź	Legnica
17:40				Attendance: 0

14 November 2020 12	Widzew Łódź	2–0	CWKS Resovia	Łódź
12:40				Stadium: Stadion Miejski Widzewa; Attendance: 0

20 November 2020 13	Bruk-Bet Termalica Nieciecza	2–0	Widzew Łódź	Nieciecza
17:40				Stadium: Stadion Termaliki Bruk-Bet; Attendance: 0

29 November 2020 14	Widzew Łódź	2–1	Arka Gdynia	Łódź
12:40		90minut		Stadium: Stadion Miejski Widzewa; Attendance: 0

3 December 2020 15	Tychy 71	2–1	Widzew Łódź	Tychy
18:00 CET	Szymon Lewicki 23'; Oskar Paprzycki (yellow card) 29'; Bartosz Biel 63'; Nowak (yellow card) 89'	Report	Możdżeń 8'; Kun (yellow card) 59'; Nowak (yellow card) 62'	Stadium: Stadion Miejski; Attendance: 0 Referee: (Poland) Marek Opaliński

=== Polish Cup ===
15 August 2020 Round of 64	Unia Skierniewice	0–4	Widzew Łódź	Skierniewice
16:00 CEST (UTC+02:00)		Łączy nas piłka 90minut	Tanżyna 8'; Ojamaa 24'; Prochownik 37'; Nowak 81'	Stadium: Stadion Miejski; Attendance: 990; Referee: Patryk Gryckiewicz (Toruń)

25 November 2020 Round of 32	Widzew Łódź	0–1	Legia Warsaw	Łódź
CET (UTC+01:00)		Łączy nas piłka 90minut	Cholewiak 6'	Stadium: Stadion Miejski Widzewa; Attendance: 0 Referee: Jarosław Przybył (Kluczbork)
Note: Match originally scheduled on 30 October 2020, 20:00 CET (UTC+01:00) was postponed due to COVID-19 disease detection in Widzew Łódź team.
