= Piotr Dziewicki =

Polish footballer (born 1979)

Personal information
- Full name: Piotr Paweł Dziewicki
- Date of birth: 26 June 1979 (age 47)
- Place of birth: Milanówek, Poland
- Height: 1.91 m (6 ft 3 in)
- Position: Defender

Youth career
- 1993: Milan Milanówek

Senior career*
Years	Team	Apps	(Gls)
1994–2003	Polonia Warsaw	63	(4)
2003–2006	Amica Wronki	42	(0)
2006–2008	Antalyaspor	60	(0)
2009–2010	Polonia Warsaw	33	(0)
2011	Dolcan Ząbki	6	(0)
2013	Milan Milanówek		

Managerial career
- 2013–2014: Polonia Warsaw
- 2015–2017: MKS Ciechanów
- 2020–2021: Ząbkovia Ząbki
- 2022: Weszło Warsaw
- 2023: GKS Jastrzębie
- 2026: Broń Radom
- * Club domestic league appearances and goals

Piotr Paweł Dziewicki (born 26 June 1979) is a Polish professional football manager and former player who was most recently in charge of Broń Radom.

== Playing career ==
Dziewicki has played for Milan Milanówek, Polonia Warsaw and Amica Wronki. At the start of 2006–07 season, he transferred to Turkish side Antalyaspor with fellow Pole Jarosław Bieniuk.

In January 2009, he returned to Polonia Warsaw and he remained there until January 2011 when he moved down one level to play for Dolcan Ząbki. He was released from Dolcan Ząbki on 1 May 2011.

== Managerial career ==
After Polonia's bankruptcy in June 2013, at the hands of Ireneusz Król, Dziewicki was one of the main figures, along with Paweł Olczak, within the association of Polonia fans led by Grzegorz Popielarz who organized the resurrection of the club, starting from IV liga. Dziewicki was appointed manager to create the new Polonia team, with the club's youth academy as its foundation. He won 6–0 in his debut against Wkra Żuromin.

In 2022, he became a coach of Weszło Warsaw, a club from a regional league, to which he moved a few weeks after leaving Ząbkovia Ząbki. He left the club on 18 May citing personal reasons.

On 26 June 2023, he was appointed manager of II liga side GKS Jastrzębie. His stint lasted just over five months, as he was relieved of his duties on 27 November.

On 28 April 2026, Dziewicki replaced Mariusz Lisiecki at the helm of III liga club Broń Radom. He was unable to save Broń from relegation to the fifth tier as they finished the 2025–26 season in 15th place.

== Managerial statistics ==
As of match played 30 May 2026

Managerial record by team and tenure
Team	From	To	Record							
Team	From	To	G	W	D	L	GF	GA	GD	Win %
Polonia Warsaw	July 2013	8 August 2014	35	25	5	5	84	21	+63	71.43
MKS Ciechanów	18 July 2015	16 May 2017	68	30	15	23	122	88	+34	44.12
Ząbkovia Ząbki	10 August 2020	10 December 2021	53	42	5	6	153	42	+111	79.25
Weszło Warsaw	11 January 2022	18 May 2022	10	6	3	1	32	9	+23	60.00
GKS Jastrzębie	26 June 2023	27 November 2023	20	5	7	8	22	29	−7	25.00
Broń Radom	28 April 2026	30 June 2026	6	1	2	3	8	8	+0	16.67
Total			192	109	37	46	421	197	+224	56.77

== Honours ==
=== Player ===
Polonia Warsaw

- Ekstraklasa: 1999–2000
- Polish Cup: 2000–01
- Polish League Cup: 1999–2000

=== Managerial ===
Polonia Warsaw

- IV liga Masovia North: 2013–14

Ząbkovia Ząbki

- IV liga Masovia (Warsaw): 2020–21
- Polish Cup (Warsaw regionals): 2021–22
