= Lesser Poland regional leagues =

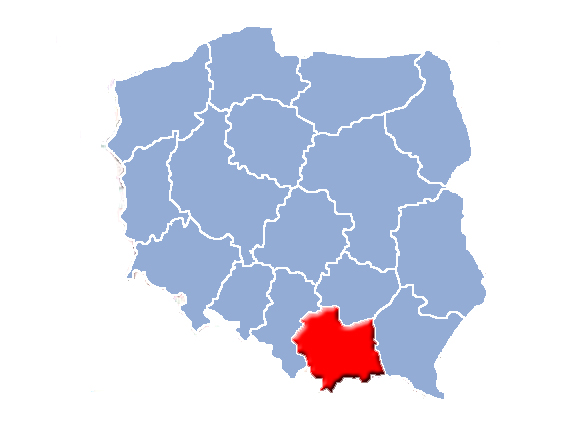
- Founded: 2000
- Country: Poland
- State: Lesser Poland
- Level on pyramid: Tier 4 - Tier 9

The Lesser Poland regional leagues, or the Ligi regionalne - Małopolski ZPN (English: Regional leagues - Lesser Poland Football Association) are the tier five to tier nine of the football leagues of the Polish football hierarchy organized in Lesser Poland.

The tournaments are organized by the Lesser Poland Football Association (Polish: Małopolski Związek Piłki Nożnej; MZPN).

== History ==
In connection with the administrative reform of the country in 1999 and the decisions of the Polish Football Association (Polish: Polski Związek Piłki Nożnej; PZPN) congress to establish football associations in all 16 voivodships, the founding assembly of the Krakow Football Association "Lesser Poland" (Polish: Krakowski Związek Piłki Nożnej „Małopolska”) with its seat in Kraków was convened on June 2, 2000, covering clubs from the new Lesser Poland Voivodeship. In accordance with the recommendation of the Polish Football Association, the new association adopted the name of the Lesser Poland Football Association (Polish: Małopolski Związek Piłki Nożnej; MZPN), its statute was registered on September 22, 2000 by the District Court in Kraków, and on November 22 of that year, the MZPN was registered by the National Court Register.

== Lesser Poland regional leagues system ==
Season	Tier 4	Tier 5	Tier 6	Tier 7	Tier 8	Tier 9	Tier 10
2001–02	IV liga Lesser Poland (group: Kraków) IV liga Lesser Poland (group: Nowy Sącz-Tarnów)	Liga okręgowa (group: Kraków) Liga okręgowa (group: Nowy Sącz) Liga okręgowa (group: Tarnów) Liga okręgowa (group: Wadowice)	Klasa A ^{(11)}	Klasa B ^{(4)}	Klasa C ^{(4)}		
2002–03	IV liga Lesser Poland (group: Kraków) IV liga Lesser Poland (group: Nowy Sącz-Tarnów)	Liga okręgowa (group: Kraków); Liga okręgowa (group: Nowy Sącz); Liga okręgowa (group: Tarnów); Liga okręgowa (group: Wadowice)	Klasa A ^{(13)}	Klasa B ^{(17)}	Klasa C ^{(7)}		
2003–04	IV liga Lesser Poland (group: Kraków) IV liga Lesser Poland (group: Nowy Sącz-Tarnów)	Liga okręgowa (group: Kraków) Liga okręgowa (group: Nowy Sącz) Liga okręgowa (group: Tarnów) Liga okręgowa (group: Wadowice)	Klasa A ^{(13)}	Klasa B ^{(24)}	Klasa C ^{(11)}		
2004–05	IV liga Lesser Poland (group: Kraków) IV liga Lesser Poland (group: Nowy Sącz-Tarnów)	Liga okręgowa (group: Kraków) Liga okręgowa (group: Nowy Sącz) Liga okręgowa (group: Tarnów) Liga okręgowa (group: Wadowice)	Klasa A ^{(15)}	Klasa B ^{(20)}	Klasa C ^{(17)}		
2005–06	IV liga Lesser Poland (group: Kraków) IV liga Lesser Poland (group: Nowy Sącz-Tarnów)	Liga okręgowa (group: Kraków) Liga okręgowa (group: Nowy Sącz) Liga okręgowa (group: Tarnów) Liga okręgowa (group: Wadowice)	Klasa A ^{(15)}	Klasa B ^{(24)}	Klasa C ^{(12)}		
2006–07	IV liga Lesser Poland	V liga Lesser Poland (group: Kraków-Wadowice) V liga Lesser Poland (group: Nowy Sącz-Tarnów)	Liga okręgowa (group: Kraków) Liga okręgowa (group: Nowy Sącz) Liga okręgowa (group: Tarnów) Liga okręgowa (group: Wadowice)	Klasa A ^{(16)}	Klasa B ^{(23)}	Klasa C ^{(11)}	
2007–08	III liga^{*}	IV liga Lesser Poland	V liga Lesser Poland (group: Kraków-Wadowice) V liga Lesser Poland (group: Nowy Sącz-Tarnów)	Liga okręgowa (group: Kraków) Liga okręgowa (group: Nowy Sącz) Liga okręgowa (group: Tarnów) Liga okręgowa (group: Wadowice)	Klasa A ^{(16)}	Klasa B ^{(23)}	Klasa C ^{(10)}
2008–09	III liga^{*}	IV liga Lesser Poland	V liga Lesser Poland (group: Kraków-Wadowice) V liga Lesser Poland (group: Nowy Sącz-Tarnów)	Liga okręgowa (group: Kraków) Liga okręgowa (group: Nowy Sącz) Liga okręgowa (group: Tarnów) Liga okręgowa (group: Wadowice)	Klasa A ^{(16)}	Klasa B ^{(24)}	Klasa C ^{(9)}
2009–10	III liga^{*}	IV liga Lesser Poland	V liga Lesser Poland (group: Kraków-Wadowice) V liga Lesser Poland (group: Nowy Sącz-Tarnów)	Liga okręgowa (group: Kraków) Liga okręgowa (group: Nowy Sącz) Liga okręgowa (group: Tarnów) Liga okręgowa (group: Wadowice)	Klasa A ^{(16)}	Klasa B ^{(21)}	Klasa C ^{(10)}
2010–11	III liga^{*}	IV liga Lesser Poland	V liga Lesser Poland (group: Kraków-Wadowice) V liga Lesser Poland (group: Nowy Sącz-Tarnów)	Liga okręgowa (group: Kraków) Liga okręgowa (group: Nowy Sącz) Liga okręgowa (group: Tarnów) Liga okręgowa (group: Wadowice)	Klasa A ^{(16)}	Klasa B ^{(21)}	Klasa C ^{(10)}
2011–12	III liga^{*}	IV liga Lesser Poland (group: East) IV liga Lesser Poland (group: West)	Liga Okręgowa (group: Kraków I) Liga Okręgowa (group: Kraków II) Liga okręgowa (group: Nowy Sącz) Liga okręgowa (group: Tarnów) Liga okręgowa (group: Wadowice)	Klasa A ^{(17)}	Klasa B ^{(21)}	Klasa C ^{(10)}	
2012–13	III liga^{*}	IV liga Lesser Poland (group: East) IV liga Lesser Poland (group: West)	Liga Okręgowa (group: Kraków I) Liga Okręgowa (group: Kraków II) Liga okręgowa (group: Nowy Sącz) Liga okręgowa (group: Tarnów) Liga okręgowa (group: Wadowice)	Klasa A ^{(17)}	Klasa B ^{(22)}	Klasa C ^{(9)}	
2013–14	III liga^{*}	IV liga Lesser Poland (group: East) IV liga Lesser Poland (group: West)	Liga Okręgowa (group: Kraków I) Liga Okręgowa (group: Kraków II) Liga Okręgowa (group: Kraków III) Liga okręgowa (group: Nowy Sącz) Liga okręgowa (group: Tarnów) Liga okręgowa (group: Wadowice)	Klasa A ^{(17)}	Klasa B ^{(25)}	Klasa C ^{(8)}	
2014–15	III liga^{*}	IV liga Lesser Poland (group: East) IV liga Lesser Poland (group: West)	Liga Okręgowa (group: Kraków I) Liga Okręgowa (group: Kraków II) Liga Okręgowa (group: Kraków III) Liga okręgowa (group: Nowy Sącz) Liga okręgowa (group: Tarnów I) Liga okręgowa (group: Tarnów II) Liga okręgowa (group: Wadowice)	Klasa A ^{(17)}	Klasa B ^{(24)}	Klasa C ^{(7)}	
2015–16	III liga^{*}	IV liga Lesser Poland (group: East) IV liga Lesser Poland (group: West)	Liga Okręgowa (group: Kraków I) Liga Okręgowa (group: Kraków II) Liga Okręgowa (group: Kraków III) Liga okręgowa (group: Nowy Sącz) Liga okręgowa (group: Tarnów I) Liga okręgowa (group: Tarnów II) Liga okręgowa (group: Wadowice)	Klasa A ^{(17)}	Klasa B ^{(22)}	Klasa C ^{(7)}	
2016–17	III liga^{*}	IV liga Lesser Poland (group: East) IV liga Lesser Poland (group: West)	Liga Okręgowa (group: Kraków I) Liga Okręgowa (group: Kraków II) Liga Okręgowa (group: Kraków III) Liga okręgowa (group: Nowy Sącz) Liga okręgowa (group: Tarnów I) Liga okręgowa (group: Tarnów II) Liga okręgowa (group: Wadowice)	Klasa A ^{(17)}	Klasa B ^{(23)}	Klasa C ^{(6)}	
2017–18	III liga^{*}	IV liga Lesser Poland (group: East) IV liga Lesser Poland (group: West)	Liga Okręgowa (group: Kraków I) Liga Okręgowa (group: Kraków II) Liga Okręgowa (group: Kraków III) Liga okręgowa (group: Nowy Sącz) Liga okręgowa (group: Tarnów I) Liga okręgowa (group: Tarnów II) Liga okręgowa (group: Wadowice)	Klasa A ^{(17)}	Klasa B ^{(22)}	Klasa C ^{(6)}	
2018–19	III liga^{*}	IV liga Lesser Poland (group: East) IV liga Lesser Poland (group: West)	Liga Okręgowa (group: Kraków I) Liga Okręgowa (group: Kraków II) Liga Okręgowa (group: Kraków III) Liga okręgowa (group: Nowy Sącz) Liga okręgowa (group: Tarnów I) Liga okręgowa (group: Tarnów II) Liga okręgowa (group: Wadowice)	Klasa A ^{(17)}	Klasa B ^{(22)}	Klasa C ^{(3)}	
2019–20	III liga^{*}	IV liga Lesser Poland (group: East) IV liga Lesser Poland (group: West)	Liga Okręgowa (group: Kraków I) Liga Okręgowa (group: Kraków II) Liga Okręgowa (group: Kraków III) Liga okręgowa (group: Nowy Sącz I) Liga okręgowa (group: Nowy Sącz II) Liga okręgowa (group: Tarnów I) Liga okręgowa (group: Tarnów II) Liga okręgowa (group: Wadowice)	Klasa A ^{(17)}	Klasa B ^{(21)}	Klasa C ^{(2)}	
2020–21	III liga^{*}	IV liga Lesser Poland (group: East) IV liga Lesser Poland (group: West)	Liga Okręgowa (group: Kraków I) Liga Okręgowa (group: Kraków II) Liga Okręgowa (group: Kraków III) Liga okręgowa (group: Nowy Sącz I) Liga okręgowa (group: Nowy Sącz II) Liga okręgowa (group: Tarnów I) Liga okręgowa (group: Tarnów II) Liga okręgowa (group: Wadowice)	Klasa A ^{(17)}	Klasa B ^{(20)}	Klasa C ^{(1)}	
2021–22	III liga^{*}	IV liga Lesser Poland (group: East) IV liga Lesser Poland (group: West)	Liga Okręgowa (group: Kraków I) Liga Okręgowa (group: Kraków II) Liga Okręgowa (group: Kraków III) Liga okręgowa (group: Nowy Sącz I) Liga okręgowa (group: Nowy Sącz II) Liga okręgowa (group: Tarnów I) Liga okręgowa (group: Tarnów II) Liga okręgowa (group: Wadowice)	Klasa A ^{(18)}	Klasa B ^{(19)}	Klasa C ^{(1)}	
2022–23	III liga^{*}	IV liga Lesser Poland	V liga Lesser Poland (group: East) V liga Lesser Poland (group: West)	Liga Okręgowa (group: Kraków I) Liga Okręgowa (group: Kraków II) Liga Okręgowa (group: Kraków III) Liga okręgowa (group: Nowy Sącz I) Liga okręgowa (group: Nowy Sącz II) Liga okręgowa (group: Tarnów I) Liga okręgowa (group: Tarnów II) Liga okręgowa (group: Wadowice)	Klasa A ^{(18)}	Klasa B ^{(19)}	Klasa C ^{(1)}
2023–24	III liga^{*}	IV liga Lesser Poland	V liga Lesser Poland (group: East) V liga Lesser Poland (group: West)	Liga Okręgowa (group: Kraków I) Liga Okręgowa (group: Kraków II) Liga Okręgowa (group: Kraków III) Liga okręgowa (group: Nowy Sącz I) Liga okręgowa (group: Nowy Sącz II) Liga okręgowa (group: Tarnów I) Liga okręgowa (group: Tarnów II) Liga okręgowa (group: Wadowice)	Klasa A ^{(18)}	Klasa B ^{(19)}	
2024–25	III liga^{*}	IV liga Lesser Poland	V liga Lesser Poland (group: East) V liga Lesser Poland (group: West)	Liga Okręgowa (group: Kraków I) Liga Okręgowa (group: Kraków II) Liga Okręgowa (group: Kraków III) Liga okręgowa (group: Nowy Sącz I) Liga okręgowa (group: Nowy Sącz II) Liga okręgowa (group: Tarnów I) Liga okręgowa (group: Tarnów II) Liga okręgowa (group: Wadowice)	Klasa A ^{(18)}	Klasa B ^{(18)}	

- * : III liga is not organized by MZPN as it is a national championship divided into groups of bigger regions then Lesser Poland, but due to the introduction of Ekstraklasa it has become the fourth level of the Polish football hierarchy
- The number (#) in Klasa A ^{(#)}, Klasa B ^{(#)} and Klasa C ^{(#)}, represents the number of groups in these leagues per season.
