= Wojciech Kowalczyk =

Polish footballer

Personal information
- Full name: Wojciech Kowalczyk
- Date of birth: 14 April 1972 (age 54)
- Place of birth: Warsaw, Poland
- Height: 1.82 m (5 ft 11 1/2 in)
- Position: Striker

Youth career
- Olimpia Warsaw

Senior career*
Years	Team	Apps	(Gls)
1990	Polonez Warsaw		
1990–1994	Legia Warsaw	109	(39)
1994–1997	Betis	62	(14)
1998–1999	Las Palmas	28	(6)
2001	Legia Warsaw	15	(3)
2001–2002	Anorthosis	27	(24)
2003–2004	APOEL	16	(3)
2005–2006	Absolwent UW Warsaw		
2018–2019	Weszło Warsaw	8	(1)
Total		258	(89)

International career
- Poland Olympic
1991–1999	Poland	39	(11)
Medal record
Representing Poland
Men's football
Olympic Games
Silver medal – second place	1992 Barcelona	Team
- * Club domestic league appearances and goals

Wojciech Kowalczyk (born 14 April 1972) is a Polish former professional footballer who played as a striker, currently working as a football pundit.

He played a bulk of his professional career with Legia Warsaw and in Spain. Early into his international career, he helped the Poland national team win the silver medal at the 1992 Summer Olympics. In 1992, he won the Polish Footballer of the Year plebiscite organized by the Piłka Nożna football weekly.

== Club career ==
Born in Warsaw, Kowalczyk played his youth football with local Olimpia and Polonez, joining country giants Legia Warsaw in 1990 at the age of 18. Almost from the very beginning, he was an automatic first-choice; in his weakest season, his first, he only appeared in 11 Ekstraklasa games, but was crucial in helping oust U.C. Sampdoria in the quarter-finals of the UEFA Cup Winners' Cup by scoring twice in Genoa for the 2–2 draw and qualification for the semifinals 3–2 on aggregate.

After having started the 1994–95 campaign with Legia (five matches, three goals, another league title), Kowalczyk moved abroad and signed with La Liga side Real Betis, but was never able to reproduce his previous form. He finished his five-year spell in Spain with UD Las Palmas in the second division, where he also appeared sparingly.

After almost one year out of football, Kowalczyk returned to his country and his main club, Legia. In late 2001 he changed countries again, joining Cyprus' Anorthosis Famagusta FC and netting a career-best 24 goals; after a nearly non-existent second season he finished his professional career in the same country, with APOEL FC, retiring at 32 – afterwards, he would play in amateur football until 2019, with AZS Absolwent UW Warsaw and Weszło Warsaw.

== International career ==
Kowalczyk gained 39 caps for Poland, scoring 11 goals. His debut came at the age of 19 on 21 August 1991, against Sweden.

His biggest international highlight was helping the Olympic squad win silver at the 1992 Summer Olympics in Barcelona. He did not score at all in the group stage, but eventually ranked third in the charts at four, three behind compatriot Andrzej Juskowiak.

== Career statistics ==
=== International ===
Appearances and goals by national team and year
National team	Year	Apps	Goals
Poland	1991	3	1
Poland	1992	7	2
Poland	1993	4	1
Poland	1994	6	0
Poland	1995	4	1
Poland	1996	2	1
Poland	1997	6	1
Poland	1998	3	3
Poland	1999	4	1
Total		39	11

Scores and results list Poland's goal tally first, score column indicates score after each Kowalczyk goal.

List of international goals scored by Wojciech Kowalczyk
No.	Date	Venue	Opponent	Score	Result	Competition
1	21 August 1991	Gdynia, Poland	Sweden	1–0	2–0	Friendly
2	19 May 1992	Salzburg, Austria	Austria	4–1	4–2	Friendly
3	14 October 1992	Rotterdam, Netherlands	Netherlands	2–0	2–2	1994 FIFA World Cup qualification
4	27 October 1993	Istanbul, Turkey	Turkey	1–0	1–2	1994 FIFA World Cup qualification
5	25 April 1995	Zabrze, Poland	Israel	3–2	4–3	UEFA Euro 1996 qualifying
6	1 May 1996	Mielec, Poland	Belarus	1–0	1–1	Friendly
7	24 September 1997	Olsztyn, Poland	Lithuania	2–0	2–0	Friendly
8	25 March 1998	Warsaw, Poland	Slovenia	1–0	2–0	Friendly
9	10 November 1998	Bratislava, Slovakia	Slovakia	2–1	3–1	Friendly
10	10 November 1998	Bratislava, Slovakia	Slovakia	3–1	3–1	Friendly
11	10 February 1999	Ta' Qali, Malta	Finland	1–0	1–1	Friendly

== Later career ==
After retiring, Kowalczyk established himself as a football pundit, initially working with Polsat Sport TV. Since 2018, he has contributed columns to the Weszło website and appeared on Weszło TV’s Liga Minus, a program analyzing Ekstraklasa matches. He was affiliated with Kanał Sportowy until 2024. Since 2024, he has been associated with the YouTube channel Kanał Zero.

In collaboration with sports journalist Krzysztof Stanowski, he co-authored the book Kowal. Prawdziwa historia (Kowal: The True Story), which was reissued in 2021.

== Personal life ==
His brother, Artur Kowalczyk, was also the player until he finished his career with Grom Lipowo in the 2013–14 season.

== Honours ==
Legia Warsaw

- Ekstraklasa: 1993–94, 1994–95, 2001–02
- Polish Cup: 1993–94
- Polish Super Cup: 1994

Anorthosis

- Cypriot Cup: 2001–02

APOEL

- Cypriot First Division: 2003–04

Weszło Warsaw

- Klasa B Warsaw III: 2018–19

Poland Olympic

- Olympic silver medal: 1992

Individual

- Polish Newcomer of the Year: 1991
- Piłka Nożna Polish Footballer of the Year: 1992
- Cypriot First Division top scorer: 2001–02
