= Krzysztof Stanowski (journalist) =

Polish businessman, journalist, publicist

- Born: Krzysztof Jakub Stanowski; 21 July 1982 (age 44); Warsaw, Poland
- Occupations: Journalist, columnist, businessman

Krzysztof Jakub Stanowski (born 21 July 1982) is a Polish journalist, columnist and businessman, co-owner of the Weszło group and Kanał Zero.

== Career ==
He graduated from the Klementyna Hoffmanowa Liceum in Warsaw. He studied journalism, but did not complete his studies.

He started his career as a journalist at the age of 14, when he was accepted for an internship in the editorial office of "Przegląd Sportowy". In 1997–2001, he wrote articles for the "Nasza Legia" magazine. In 2002, he was a correspondent for "Przegląd Sportowy" at the 2002 FIFA World Cup, and in 2005 he became the head of the football department of this newspaper. Then he collaborated with "Super Express", "Dziennik" and the editorial offices of "Futbol" and "Futbolnews". He is the co-founder and co-owner of the portal weszlo.com, which was launched in 2008, as well as the internet sports radio weszlo.fm. He was a Polish ambassador of bookmakers such as "bet24" and "Party Gaming".

Co-author of biographies of such footballers as Andrzej Iwan, Wojciech Kowalczyk and Grzegorz Szamotulski. In 2013, he was nominated for the Grand Press award for the best Polish journalist. In 2016–2017, he hosted the program Stan Futbolu on Eleven Sports, who currently continues on the WeszłoTV/weszlo.fm and TVP Sport.

In 2018, he founded the KTS Weszło Warsaw football club which a year later was promoted to the Warsaw A class. He was a co-organizer of bringing to this club footballers from the Democratic Republic of the Congo, who played there at amateur level, fully financing the operation and their life after their arrival in Poland. Among the players who were brought in, Merveille Fundambu ended up in the first-league Radomiak Radom and Widzew Łódź,; Ituku Owe Bonyanga in the second-league Znicz Pruszków. and Jonathan Simba Bwanga in the first-league Stomil Olsztyn.

In March 2020, together with Michał Pol, Tomasz Smokowski and Mateusz Borek, he officially launched Kanał Sportowy on YouTube. In November 2023, he left the channel and sold his stock in Kanał Sportowy Sp.z.o.o.

In 2021, as part of a happening, together with Robert Mazurek, he published a book of poems entitled "Kmioty Polskie", the income from which was donated to charity.

In February 2024, he started Kanał Zero, his first independent project since Kanał Sportowy. One of the first videos on the channel was an interview with the President of Poland - Andrzej Duda. The interviewers were Stanowski himself and a Polish journalist Robert Mazurek. In the video he announced his plans to candidate for president in the 2025 Polish presidential election. He stated that he did not want to win, but rather see how the presidential campaign's organization works.

== Personal life ==
Son of Urszula. His father died in 1997. Married to Marta, they have sons Leon and Aleksander. Stanowski is a football enthusiast and FC Barcelona fan.

== Publications ==
- Kowal. Prawdziwa historia (ISBN 9788376701615) – a book about Wojciech Kowalczyk. It had its re-edition in 2021.
- Andrzej Iwan. Spalony (ISBN 9788376705422) – a book about Andrzej Iwan
- Szamo (ISBN 9788378819431) – a book about Grzegorz Szamotulski
- Stan Futbolu (ISBN 9788377002322)
- Kmioty Polskie
