= Kanał Sportowy =

Polish online sports channel

- Industry: Sports broadcasting
- Founded: 2019
- Founder: Mateusz Borek, Michał Pol, Tomasz Smokowski, Krzysztof Stanowski, Maciej Sawicki
- Headquarters: Warsaw, Poland
- Areas served: Worldwide; (mainly Poland)

Kanał Sportowy ("The Sports Channel") is an online sports channel founded at the end of 2019 (it started operating in March 2020).

Many of the programs are run by its owners: Mateusz Borek, Michał Pol, Tomasz Smokowski. In November 2023, Krzysztof Stanowski sold his stake in the partnership to Maciej Wandzel.

In August 2021, the YouTube channel had 550,000. subscribers and a total of over 180 million views of the materials posted there. Another 180 thousand subscribers and 34 million views were recorded by Kanał Sportowy Extra, containing additional materials.

== History ==
Four Polish sports journalists: Mateusz Borek, Michał Pol, Tomasz Smokowski and Krzysztof Stanowski, decided at the end of 2019 to create a project on the border of online television and sports journalism as part of the YouTube channel promoted through private profiles in social media (at that time, Borek had 600,000, Pol over 500,000, Stanowski 250,000, and Smokowski nearly 150,000 followers). A few days after the announcement of the launch of the program, the channel had more than fifty thousand subscriptions, and the creators at that time did not publish any film. In December 2019, journalists conducted one Christmas charity live, but the official launch of the Kanał Sportowy took place on March 1, 2020. By that time, the number of subscriptions had grown to eighty thousand, and two days later it exceeded one hundred thousand. Initially, two hundred thousand zlotys were invested in the project. Due to the launch of the channel, some owners had to quit their job in television.

The first program of the Sports Channel was Misja Futbol (Mission Futbol), implemented as a co-production of Onet. The lecturers transferred his production to their own studio. The first episode was watched live on YouTube by an average of 65,000 viewers. In subsequent broadcasts, the series approached 100,000 viewers live. Since 2021, the program called Moc Futbolu (The power of football) has been implemented independently by Kanał Sportowy.

During the epidemiological crisis, the Hejt Park program appeared in the schedule, in which viewers can call the studio and ask questions to the guests and the host during the broadcast. Celebrities not related to sports also began to appear in Hejt Parks. In June 2021 the most popular were recordings with Marcin Najman, Jaś Kapela, Paris Platynov, Quebonafide, Sławomir Mentzen, and Robert Mazurek.

Another original program of Kanał Sportowy - Liga PL - on June 1, 2020, also appeared on TVP Sport (it was a regular broadcast every Monday). The channel sometimes shows live broadcasts. On November 15, 2020, the first live sports broadcast was broadcast: an A-class match between KTS Weszło Warsaw and Madziar Nieporęt. In July and August 2021, the channel cooperated with Telewizja Polska during the UEFA Euro 2020. Every day, on the day of the matches played on TVP Sport, an original program was broadcast in the studio of Kanał Sportowy. Its journalists also appeared on TVP as experts. In August 2021, the channel took media patronage over the Fame MMA federation gala.

From September 2021, the president of Kanał Sportowy is Maciej Sawicki, former footballer and secretary general of the Polish Football Association in 2012–2021, who replaced Tomasz Smokowski in this position. In November 2023, Krzysztof Stanowski sold his stake in the partnership to Maciej Wandzel.

== Importance and influence on traditional media ==
During the epidemic crisis, the impact of COVID-19 on global sport was reported on the Kanał Sportowy in regular broadcasts from March 9, 2020, interviewing footballers, coaches and the most important people of Polish football, while Canal+ Sport and Eleven Sports took advantage of this solution a week later. Televisions duplicating the solutions already used in the project of Borek, Pol, Smokowski and Stanowski received much less interest.

== See also ==
- Kanał Zero
- Weszło
