= KTS Weszło =

- Full name: Klub Towarzysko-Sportowy Weszło
- Founded: 17 January 2018; 8 years ago
- Ground: Bemowski Ośrodek Piłki Nożnej
- Chairman: Krzysztof Stanowski
- Manager: Łukasz Ryczkowski
- League: III liga, group I
- 2025–26: IV liga Masovia, 1st of 18 (promoted)
- Website: kts.weszlo.com/dashboard

KTS Weszło, informally, due to the city of its headquarters, also called KTS Weszło Warszawa, is a Polish football club based in Warsaw, Masovian Voivodeship. It was founded by media and sports group Weszło and is run as a fan-owned initiative.

In the 2026–27 season, they compete in group I of the III liga, having earned promotion from the IV liga Masovia in the 2025–26 season.

== Financing and ownership ==
The club is owned by 11000 amateur investors, who bought shares in 2018, raising 20 million zł initially. It was the first such initiative in Poland.

In 2021 the club was crowdfunded under the initiative led by Krzysztof Stanowski. 3963 investors were found raising 4.5 million zł in 90 minutes for 25000 shares accounting for 20% of the total.

== History ==
It was established on 17 January 2018. In the first season, its team included players with experience in the Polish national team, Ekstraklasa (Wojciech Kowalczyk, Grzegorz Szamotulski, Dawid Janczyk, Daniel Kokosiński), foreign athletes (Jonathan Simba Bwanga, Merveille Fundambu) and celebrities (Quebonafide). In the 2018–19 season, KTS was promoted to A-class.

On 5 January 2020, it won the Amber Cup Tournament in Gliwice, ahead of the Polska Stars and Kamil Wilczek Team. In the following season, suspended indefinitely due to the COVID-19 pandemic in Poland, the team placed third in its group, but retained its chances of promotion to the Warsaw regional league through play-offs. In them, the KTS team lost 1–3 to Orzeł Baniocha. In the 2020–21 season, KTS achieved promotion, winning 24 of its 26 matches, scoring 170 goals and losing 13.

On 9 July 2022, Piotr Kobierecki became the coach, replacing Piotr Dziewicki in this position. In August 2022, the club organized "Summer in the City" events for children in the Warsaw district of Białołęka, with guests including Poland's national team manager Czesław Michniewicz and footballers Jakub Kosecki and Grzegorz Szamotulski. At the inauguration of the 2022–23 season, Weszło defeated Drukarz Warsaw 6–0. On 2 March 2022, Krzysztof Stanowski became president of KTS.

On 19 October 2022, following a 9–1 semifinal win against Ożarowianka Ozarów Mazowiecki, the club advanced to the final of the Polish Cup at the regional level of the Warsaw MZPN for the second consecutive year, where it won 4–1 against Mszczonowianka Mszczonów. By winning the final, the club earned the right to participate in the Polish Cup of the Masovian level, in which it received a free draw in the 1/8 final, and lost 2–3 in the quarterfinals to third-league Pogoń Grodzisk Mazowiecki, dropping out of the competition.

On 1 May 2023, KTS won 5–1 against Wkra Żuromin, securing promotion to IV liga Masovia. On 13 May 2023, they recorded its highest victory ever, thrashing Skra Drobin, last in the table, 15–0 at the Hutnik Warsaw Stadium. KTS finished the 2022–23 season with a set of victories, scoring 156 goals, losing 14.

In the 2023–24 season, KTS Weszło defended the Polish Cup at the level of the Warsaw MZPN, winning 4–2 against Polonia Warsaw II in the final on 8 November 2023. Kobierecki was dismissed on 6 April 2024, and replaced ten days later by Bartłomiej Grzelak and Marcin Burkhardt on an interim basis, with Maciej Tarnogrodzki scheduled to take over as manager at the start of the 2024–25 season.

== Notable players ==
KTS players were Wojciech Kowalczyk, the 1992 Summer Olympics medalist and Grzegorz Szamotulski, the Polish national team representative. In July 2022, ex-Polish international Jakub Kosecki joined the club.

== Statistics ==
Season	League	Place	W	D	L	GF	GA	Pts	Warsaw Polish Cup	Masovian Polish Cup
2018–19	B-class (VIII)	1st of 11	18	2	0	94	19	56	3R (lost to Promnik Łaskarzew 2–3)	Did not compete
2019–20	A-class (VII)	3rd of 14	10	1	2	69	15	31	5R (lost to Milan Milanówek 2–2 p. 4–5)	Did not compete
2020–21	A-class (VII)	1st of 14	24	1	1	170	13	73	Did not compete	Did not compete
2021–22	Regional league (VI)	1st of 16	22	4	4	125	32	70	Runners-up (lost to Ząbkovia Ząbki 1–5)	Did not compete
2022–23	V liga (VI)	1st of 15	28	0	0	156	14	84	Winners	Quarter-final (lost to Pogoń Grodzisk Maz. 2–3)
2023–24	IV liga (V)	4th of 18	22	6	6	100	39	72	Winners	Round of 16 (lost to Pogoń Grodzisk Maz. 1–4)
2024–25	IV liga (V)	4th of 18	19	7	8	98	45	64	Quarter-final (lost to Ząbkovia Ząbki 0–3)	Did not compete
2025–26	IV liga (V)	1st of 18	25	3	6	81	35	78	Round of 16 (lost to Talent Warsaw 0–2)	Did not compete
Green marks a season followed by promotion, red a season followed by relegation.
