= Smokowski =

Smokowski (feminine Smokowska) is a Polish surname. Notable people with the surname include:

- Tomasz Smokowski (born 1973), Polish journalist
- Wincenty Smokowski (1797–1876), Polish-Lithuanian painter

== See also ==
- Srokowski
