= Maciej Tarnogrodzki =

Polish association former football player and manager (born 1975)

Personal information
- Full name: Maciej Tarnogrodzki
- Date of birth: 28 August 1975 (age 51)
- Place of birth: Gniezno, Poland
- Height: 1.76 m (5 ft 9 in)
- Position: Midfielder

Team information
- Current team: ŁKS Łomża (manager)

Youth career
- 1987–1990: Mieszko Gniezno
- 1990–1993: Lech Poznań
- 1993–1994: Sokół Pniewy

Senior career*
Years	Team	Apps	(Gls)
1994–1995	Sokół Pniewy II		
1996–1997	Obra Kosciań		
1997–1998	Unia Swarzędz		
2000–2001	Bray Wanderers		
2002–2003	Tolka Rovers		
2004–2005	Belgrove FC		

Managerial career
- 2009–2012: Shelbourne Youth
- 2012–2016: Bray Wanderers U19
- 2015: Bray Wanderers (caretaker)
- 2016–2019: UCD U19
- 2019: UCD
- 2024–2025: Weszło Warsaw
- 2025: GKS Jastrzębie
- 2026–: ŁKS Łomża
- * Club domestic league appearances and goals

Maciej Tarnogrodzki (born 28 August 1975) is a Polish professional football manager and former player who is currently in charge of III liga club ŁKS Łomża.

From 2009 to 2012, Tarnogrodzki worked with youth and reserve teams of Shelbourne.

In April 2015, after previously managing their under-19 side, he was appointed as interim manager of the Bray Wanderers's senior team following the resignation of Alan Mathews. He completed Pro Licence coaching qualifications in 2018.

On 21 August 2019, Tarnogrodzki was appointed as manager of League of Ireland Premier Division club UCD, stepping up from the role of under-19's manager, which he had previously held for three years.

After returning to Poland in 2020, Tarnogrodzki was appointed sporting director of Warsaw-based football academy Escola Varsovia.

On 16 April 2024, it was announced he would take charge of IV liga Masovia side Weszło Warsaw at the start of the 2024–25 season. After leading the club to a 4th-place finish, Tarnogrodzki left the club at the end of the season.

Soon after, on 5 July 2025, Tarnogrodzki signed as the manager of II liga club GKS Jastrzębie. On 22 September, he left the club by mutual agreement.

On 11 April 2026, he was announced as the new manager of III liga club ŁKS Łomża.

== Managerial statistics ==
As of match played 3 June 2026

Managerial record by team and tenure
Team	From	To	Record							
Team	From	To	G	W	D	L	GF	GA	GD	Win %
Bray Wanderers (caretaker)	2 April 2015	7 May 2015	6	2	1	3	8	17	−9	33.33
UCD II	25 November 2016	20 August 2019	60	31	15	14	128	73	+55	51.67
UCD	21 August 2019	31 December 2019	12	2	2	8	13	29	−16	16.67
Weszło Warsaw	1 July 2024	30 June 2025	37	21	7	9	105	51	+54	56.76
GKS Jastrzębie	5 July 2025	22 September 2025	10	1	3	6	9	20	−11	10.00
ŁKS Łomża	11 April 2026	Present	10	6	1	3	21	10	+11	60.00
Total			135	63	29	43	285	200	+85	46.67
