= Maciej Świdzikowski =

Polish footballer

Personal information
- Date of birth: 9 September 1989 (age 37)
- Place of birth: Radom, Poland
- Height: 1.82 m (6 ft 0 in)
- Position: Defender

Team information
- Current team: Radomiak Radom (deputy academy director)

Youth career
- Beniaminek Radom
- 2005–2006: AON Rembertów
- 2006–2009: Legia Warsaw

Senior career*
Years	Team	Apps	(Gls)
2009–2023	Radomiak Radom	271	(27)
2022–2023	→ Weszło Warsaw (loan)	27	(7)
2023–2024	Weszło Warsaw	26	(3)
Total		324	(37)
- * Club domestic league appearances and goals

Maciej Świdzikowski (born 9 September 1989) is a Polish former professional footballer who played as a defender. He is currently the deputy director of Radomiak Radom's academy.

== Career ==
Świdzikowski started his career with Radomiak Radom.

On 11 July 2022, he left Radomiak for the first time in thirteen years to join V liga side Weszło Warsaw on a one-year loan spell.

In August 2024, after leaving Weszło a month prior, Świdzikowski was announced as the new sporting director of IV liga Opole club Polonia Nysa.

On 6 July 2026, he returned to Radomiak and was appointed the deputy director of their academy.

== Honours ==
Radomiak Radom

- I liga: 2020–21
- II liga: 2018–19
- III liga Łódź-Masovia: 2011–12, 2014–15

Weszło Warsaw

- V liga Masovia I: 2022–23
- Polish Cup (Warsaw regionals): 2022–23, 2023–24
