= Daniel Kokosiński =

Polish footballer

Personal information
- Date of birth: 25 July 1985 (age 41)
- Place of birth: Płońsk, Poland
- Height: 1.88 m (6 ft 2 in)
- Position: Defender

Team information
- Current team: Motor Lublin (assistant)

Youth career
- Błękitni Raciąż
- Wisła Płock

Senior career*
Years	Team	Apps	(Gls)
2004–2005	Wisła Płock II		
2005–2009	Znicz Pruszków		
2009–2011	Polonia Warsaw	3	(0)
2012	Znicz Pruszków	9	(2)
2013	Bałtyk Gdynia	17	(2)
2014–2016	Kotwica Kołobrzeg	25	(2)
2019–2021	Weszło Warsaw	19	(4)

Managerial career
- 2017: Kotwica Kołobrzeg
- * Club domestic league appearances and goals

Daniel Kokosiński (born 25 July 1985) is a Polish professional football coach and former player who played as a defender. He is currently the assistant manager of Ekstraklasa club Motor Lublin.

== Club career ==
Kokosiński started his career with Wisła Płock II.

In June 2009, he moved to the Ekstraklasa side Polonia Warsaw, for a fee of £102,350. In his first official fixture for the club, a UEFA Europa League qualifying match, he scored the sole goal in a 1–0 victory over Juvenus/Dogana. His debut in the Ekstraklasa was less successful, as Polonia was defeated 4–0 by Korona Kielce.

== Private life ==
He is a brother of Błażej Kokosiński (born 20 December 1983), a former goalkeeper.

== Honours ==
Kotwica Kołobrzeg

- III liga Pomerania–West Pomerania: 2013–14

Weszło Warsaw

- Klasa A Warsaw I: 2020–21
