= Wkra Żuromin =

Association football club in Żuromin, Poland

MKS Wkra Żuromin
- Full name: Miejski Klub Sportowy Wkra Żuromin
- Founded: 20 October 1968; 57 years ago
- Ground: Municipal Stadium
- Capacity: 2,000
- Chairman: Wojciech Rochna
- Manager: Vacant
- League: Regional league Ciechanów-Ostrołęka
- 2025–26: 5th of 16
- Website: Wkra Żuromin on Facebook
| colours | colours |

Wkra Żuromin is a football club based in the town of Żuromin, Mazovia, Poland. As of the 2026–27 season, they compete in the Ciechanów-Ostrołęka group of the regional league, the seventh level of the Polish league pyramid.

== History ==
The club was founded on the 20 October 1968 as Ludowy Klub Sportowy Wkra Żuromin. Following a sponsorship deal in 1991 with the disco polo label Omega Music, the club changed its name to KS Wkra Omega Żuromin. Since 2001, the club has played under its current name.

Since its inception, a youth team from Wkra Żuromin have regularly competed in the Piłkarska Kadra Czeka tournament organised by the Ludowe Zespoły Sportowe union. The club reached the quarter finals of the competition in 2012 and 2021.

In 2021, Wkra Żuromin received government funding amounting to 50,000 PLN in order to foster the development of sports in Żuromin County.

After having been relegated to the Liga okręgowa at the close of the 2022–23 campaign, Wkra Żuromin immediately regained promotion back into the V liga Masovia the following season. Having gained 77 points, scoring 126 goals over the course of the season, the team beat their opponents by 31 goals in their final game.

== Ground ==
The club play at the Żuromin Municipal Stadium. In 2019 the ground was renovated as part of a Ministry of Sport and Tourism initiative, training pitches were created, a new irrigation system installed, and the stands were replaced.

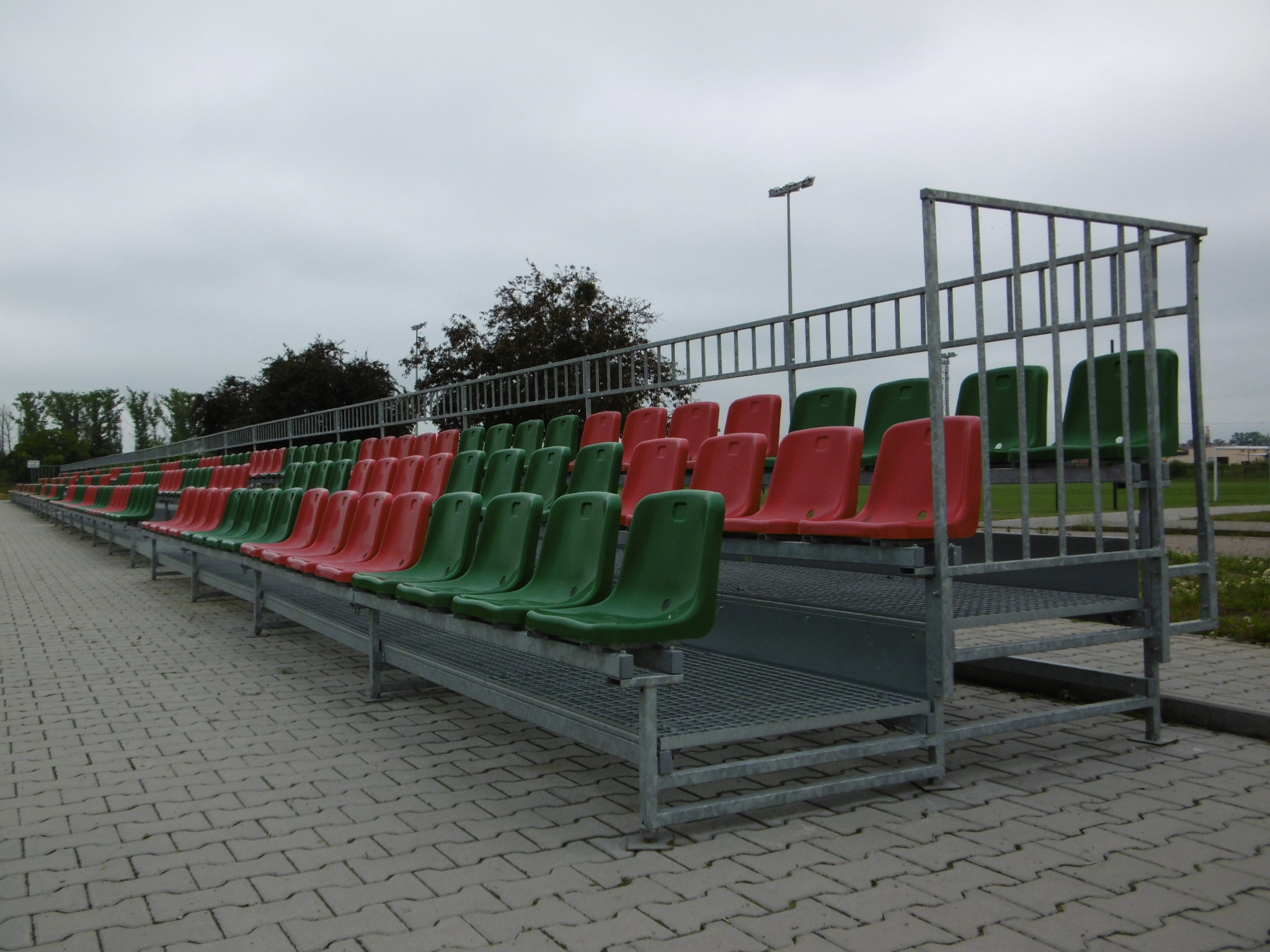
Municipal Stadium in Żuromin

== Supporters ==
Fans of the team have been notable amongst Polish clubs for their vocal anti-fascism. Because of their political stance and active support of the "Never Again" Association, supporters of Wkra Żuromin have been the target of violence from far-right fans of opposing clubs.

== Notable former players ==
Łukasz Teodorczyk began his career at Wkra Żuromin and is now an ambassador for the club. Whilst playing for Lech Poznań, in 2014, disgruntled fans of the club displayed a banner referencing Wkra Żuromin in criticism of Teodorczyk. In 2014 Teodorczyk left Lech on a transfer to Dynamo Kiev. In accordance with FIFA regulations Dynamo were required to pay Wkra Żuromin 2.5% of his transfer fee but failed to do so, with the matter going to arbitration. The dispute was finally settled in 2016 with Wkra Żuromin receiving an undisclosed amount from Dynamo Kiev.
