= Daniel Mąka =

Polish footballer (born 1988)

Personal information
- Full name: Daniel Mąka
- Date of birth: 30 April 1988 (age 38)
- Place of birth: Warsaw, Poland
- Height: 1.71 m (5 ft 7 in)
- Position: Midfielder

Team information
- Current team: Orzeł Parzęczew
- Number: 18

Youth career
- Salos Warsaw
- Agrykola Warsaw

Senior career*
Years	Team	Apps	(Gls)
2005–2011	Polonia Warsaw	85	(14)
2010–2011	→ Termalica Bruk-Bet (loan)	15	(0)
2011–2012	Polonia Bytom	29	(7)
2012–2013	Zawisza Bydgoszcz	26	(7)
2013–2014	GKS Tychy	18	(0)
2014–2016	Bytovia Bytów	38	(2)
2016–2021	Widzew Łódź	119	(29)
2018–2024	Widzew Łódź II	99	(78)
2025–	Orzeł Parzęczew	33	(8)

International career
2008–2010	Poland U21	3	(0)
- * Club domestic league appearances and goals as of 12:35, 30 June 2026 (UTC)

Daniel Mąka (born 30 April 1988) is a Polish professional footballer who plays as a midfielder for IV liga Łódź club Orzeł Parzęczew. He is also a member of the Widzew Łódź's academy training staff.

== Club career ==
Mąka scored his first goal in the Ekstraklasa on his debut, the first game of the 2008–09 campaign, which was also the first "derby" for Mąka, against Polonia's fierce rivals Legia Warsaw. The match ended in a 2–2 draw. Only five games later, after coming off the bench in the 57th minute, he scored his first hat-trick against Polonia Bytom in a 4–0 victory.

In the summer of 2010, he was loaned to I liga club Termalica Bruk-Bet Nieciecza. He returned to Polonia one year later, but couldn't fit into first team and was later moved to reserve team. After that, he decided to cancel his agreement by mutual consent.

In August 2011, he joined Polonia Bytom on a two-year contract.

On 20 January 2021, Mąka joined the liga okręgowa's reserve team of Widzew Łódź and became a member of the club's academy training staff. He signed a contract till the end of June 2021, with an option to extend it for one year if the reserves were promoted to the IV liga. At the conclusion of the 2023–24 season, Mąka was released by the club as a player and received an offer to remain in the academy as a coach.

On 21 March 2025, Mąka joined another regional league club Orzeł Parzęczew.

== Honours ==
Zawisza Bydgoszcz

- I liga: 2012–13

Widzew Łódź

- III liga, group I: 2017–18

Widzew Łódź II

- Regional league Łódź: 2020–21

Orzeł Parzęczew

- Regional league Łódź: 2025–26

Individual

- IV liga Łódź top scorer: 2021–22
