= Marek Hanousek =

Czech footballer

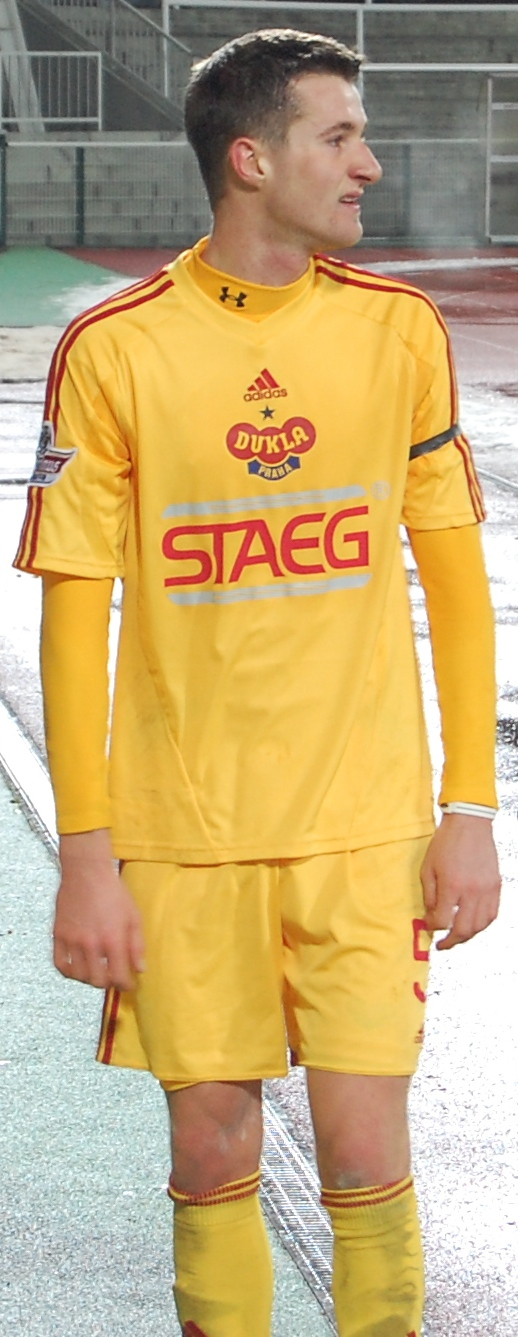
- Hanousek with Dukla Prague in 2012

Personal information
- Date of birth: 6 August 1991 (age 35)
- Place of birth: Dolní Kralovice, Czechoslovakia
- Height: 1.86 m (6 ft 1 in)
- Position: Defensive midfielder

Team information
- Current team: Widzew Łódź II
- Number: 25

Youth career
- 2000–2009: Slavia Prague

Senior career*
Years	Team	Apps	(Gls)
2009–2011	Dukla Prague	65	(8)
2012–2014	Viktoria Plzeň	11	(3)
2012	→ Dukla Prague (loan)	14	(1)
2013–2014	→ Dukla Prague (loan)	20	(0)
2014–2019	Dukla Prague	116	(5)
2019–2021	Karviná	34	(1)
2021–2026	Widzew Łódź	141	(6)
2025	Widzew Łódź II	1	(0)
2026	Dukla Prague	11	(0)
2026–	Widzew Łódź II	8	(0)

International career
2008	Czech Republic U18	3	(0)
2010	Czech Republic U19	1	(0)
2011	Czech Republic U20	1	(0)
2011–2012	Czech Republic U21	7	(0)
- * Club domestic league appearances and goals as of 16:34, 21 October 2026 (UTC)

Marek Hanousek (born 6 August 1991) is a Czech professional footballer who plays as a midfielder for III liga club Widzew Łódź II. He has represented his country at under-21 level.

== Club career ==
=== Dukla ===
Hanousek played in the Czech National Football League with Dukla from 2009. In an August 2010 match against Viktoria Žižkov, Hanousek was shown a red card for a foul on Igor Súkenník in the penalty area after 88 minutes. The game, having been tied 1−1, was won from the subsequent penalty kick by Žižkov striker Miroslav Marković. Dukla lost just two more times that season to finish the 2010–11 Czech 2. Liga eight points clear of any other team and thus winning promotion to the Czech First League.

Having been promoted to the top flight, Hanousek made his Czech First League debut with Dukla on 29 July 2011 against Sigma Olomouc, going on to score five goals in fifteen starts in the first half of the 2011–12 Czech First League. In February 2012 he signed for Viktoria Plzeň on a three-and-a-half-year contract, however according to the terms of his contract he stayed at Dukla until the end of the season.

=== Plzeň ===
Hanousek returned to Juliska in September 2012 and scored the fourth goal for Plzeň against his former club in a 4−1 win for the visitors.

Hanousek returned to Dukla on loan in September 2013 until the end of the 2013–14 season, although he returned to Plzeň in January 2014. After spending the second half of the season on loan at Dukla, he transferred back to the club, signing a three-year contract in June 2014.

== International career ==
Hanousek has played at national level for youth teams of the Czech Republic. He started with the under-18 team in 2008 and subsequently represented his country at each subsequent level up to under-21.

== Career statistics ==
As of match played 15 September 2026

Appearances and goals by club, season and competition
Season	Club	League	League		National cup (Note: Includes Czech Cup, Polish Cup)		Europe		Other		Total	
Season	Club	League	Apps	Goals	Apps	Goals	Apps	Goals	Apps	Goals	Apps	Goals
Dukla Prague	2009–10	CFNL	23	0	—		—		—		23	0
Dukla Prague	2010–11	CNFL	26	3	—		—		—		26	3
Dukla Prague	2011–12	Czech First League	30	6	1	0	—		—		31	6
Dukla Prague	Total		79	9	1	0	—		—		80	9
Viktoria Plzeň	2012–13	Czech First League	10	3	0	0	8 (Note: Appearances in UEFA Europa League)	1	—		18	4
Viktoria Plzeň	2013–14	Czech First League	1	0	0	0	0	0	1 (Note: Appearance in Czech Supercup)	0	2	0
Viktoria Plzeň	Total		11	3	0	0	8	1	1	0	20	4
Dukla Prague (loan)	2013–14	Czech First League	20	0	5	2	—		—		25	2
Dukla Prague	2014–15	Czech First League	29	3	1	1	—		—		30	4
Dukla Prague	2015–16	Czech First League	29	1	5	2	—		—		34	3
Dukla Prague	2016–17	Czech First League	29	1	3	2	—		—		32	3
Dukla Prague	2017–18	Czech First League	10	0	0	0	—		—		10	0
Dukla Prague	2018–19	Czech First League	19	0	1	0	—		—		20	0
Dukla Prague	Total		136	5	15	7	—		—		151	12
Karviná	2019–20	Czech First League	28	1	0	0	—		—		28	1
Karviná	2020–21	Czech First League	6	0	2	0	—		—		8	0
Karviná	Total		34	1	2	0	—		—		36	1
Widzew Łódź	2020–21	I liga	15	1	—		—		—		15	1
Widzew Łódź	2021–22	I liga	33	3	3	1	—		—		36	4
Widzew Łódź	2022–23	Ekstraklasa	30	2	1	2	—		—		31	4
Widzew Łódź	2023–24	Ekstraklasa	29	0	3	0	—		—		32	0
Widzew Łódź	2024–25	Ekstraklasa	25	0	3	0	—		—		28	0
Widzew Łódź	2025–26	Ekstraklasa	9	0	1	0	—		—		10	0
Widzew Łódź	Total		141	6	11	3	—		—		152	9
Widzew Łódź II	2025–26	III liga, group I	1	0	—		—		—		1	0
Dukla Prague	2025–26	Czech First League	11	0	—		—		—		11	0
Widzew Łódź II	2026–27	III liga, group I	8	0	1	0	—		—		9	0
Career total			421	24	30	10	8	1	1	0	460	35

== Honours ==
Dukla Prague

- Czech National Football League: 2010–11

Viktoria Plzeň

- Czech First League: 2012–13
