= Dariusz Banasik =

Polish footballer and manager

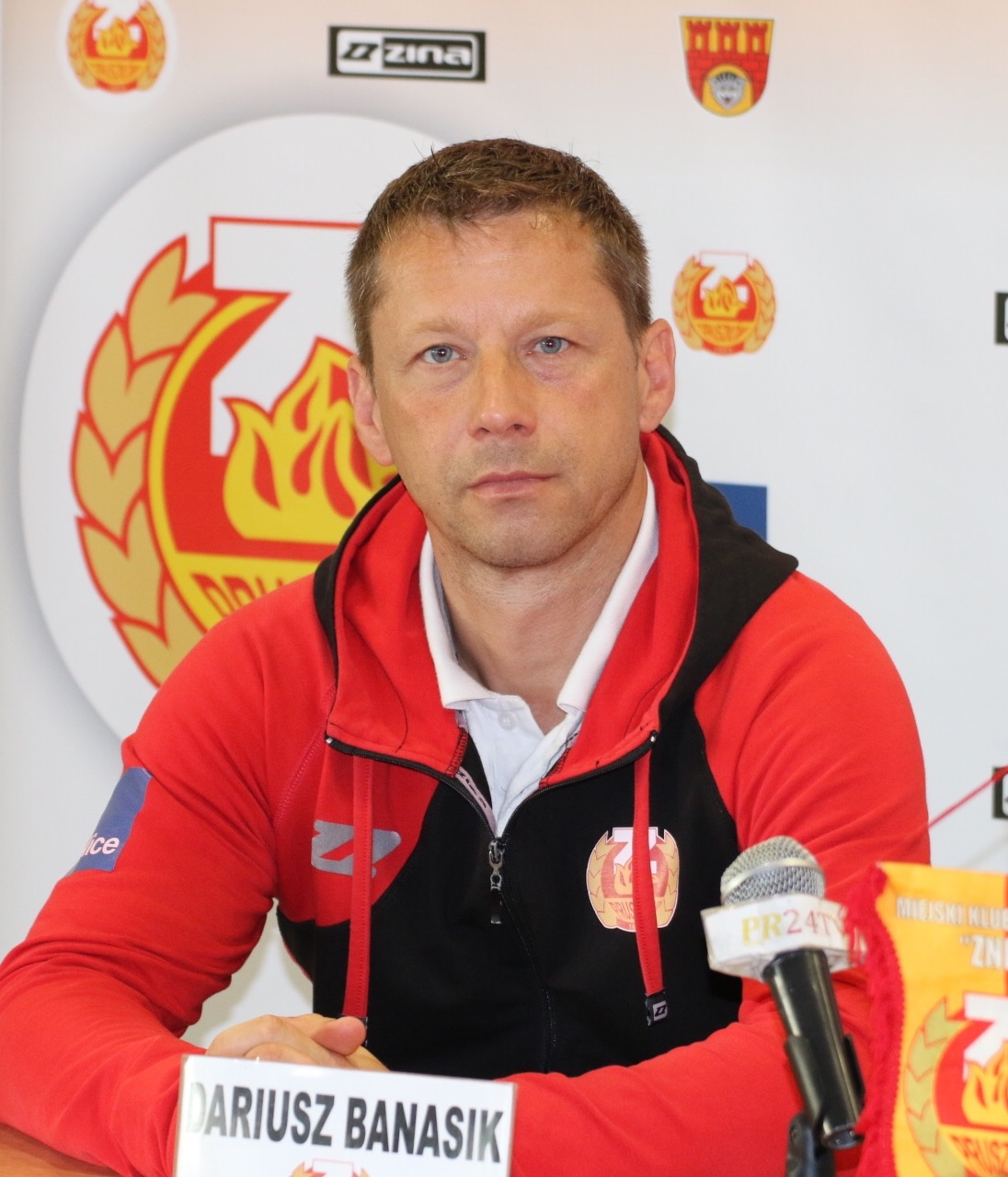

Personal information
- Full name: Dariusz Banasik
- Date of birth: 16 July 1973 (age 53)
- Place of birth: Łęczyca, Poland
- Position: Forward

Senior career*
Years	Team	Apps	(Gls)
- Górnik Łęczyca
1993–1994	GKS Bełchatów	4	(1)

Managerial career
- 2008–2013: Legia Warsaw (MESA)
- 2013–2014: Legia Warsaw II
- 2014: Legia Warsaw (U19)
- 2014–2016: Znicz Pruszków
- 2016: Pogoń Siedlce
- 2017: Zagłębie Sosnowiec
- 2017–2018: Pogoń Siedlce
- 2018–2022: Radomiak Radom
- 2023–2024: GKS Tychy
- 2026: Arka Gdynia
- * Club domestic league appearances and goals

Dariusz Banasik (born 16 July 1973) is a Polish professional football manager and former player who played as a forward. He was most recently in charge of Arka Gdynia.

== Managerial statistics ==
As of match played 23 May 2026

Managerial record by team and tenure
Team	From	To	Record							
Team	From	To	G	W	D	L	GF	GA	GD	Win %
Legia Warsaw II	1 July 2013	7 January 2014	21	11	4	6	33	20	+13	52.38
Znicz Pruszków	25 June 2014	4 June 2016	76	34	23	19	105	79	+26	44.74
Pogoń Siedlce	13 June 2016	30 December 2016	21	10	2	9	20	21	−1	47.62
Zagłębie Sosnowiec	2 January 2017	18 August 2017	21	9	3	9	27	28	−1	42.86
Pogoń Siedlce	5 December 2017	30 June 2018	17	3	6	8	20	23	−3	17.65
Radomiak Radom	1 July 2018	25 April 2022	141	67	39	35	219	137	+82	47.52
GKS Tychy	3 April 2023	27 August 2024	52	20	11	21	58	70	−12	38.46
Arka Gdynia	1 April 2026	23 May 2026	8	1	3	4	9	17	−8	12.50
Total			357	155	91	111	491	395	+96	43.42

== Honours ==
=== Manager ===
Radomiak Radom

- I liga: 2020–21
- II liga: 2018–19

Individual

- Ekstraklasa Coach of the Month: November 2021
