= Jonathan Simba Bwanga =

Congolese footballer (born 2000)

Personal information
- Full name: Jonathan Simba Bwanga
- Date of birth: 8 December 2000 (age 25)
- Place of birth: Kinshasa, DR Congo
- Height: 1.88 m (6 ft 2 in)
- Position: Centre-back

Senior career*
Years	Team	Apps	(Gls)
- Etanchéité
2019–2020	Renaissance du Congo		
2021	Weszło Warsaw	9	(2)
2021–2022	Radomiak Radom	0	(0)
2021–2022	→ Stomil Olsztyn (loan)	18	(1)
- * Club domestic league appearances and goals

Jonathan Simba Bwanga (born 8 December 2000) is a Congolese former footballer who played as a centre-back.

== Club career ==
Jonathan Simba Bwanga began his football career in his home country, the Democratic Republic of the Congo, before moving to Poland to join KTS Weszło in 2021. On 28 July 2021, he signed with Radomiak Radom. Shortly afterward, he was loaned to Stomil Olsztyn.

He made his debut in the I liga on 14 August 2021, in a 0–1 defeat against Arka Gdynia. In his fourth match, on 13 September 2021, he scored his first I liga goal in a 4–2 victory against Resovia. On 20 May 2022, two days before the season's final matchday, his loan was cut short. He concluded his time in Olsztyn with 18 league appearances, 1 goal, and 1 match in the Polish Cup.

== Honours ==
Weszło Warsaw

- Klasa A Warsaw I: 2020–21
