= Amber Cup Tournament =

Annual Polish indoor football tournament

- Founded: 2006; 20 years ago
- Region: Słupsk (2006–2015); Gdańsk (2016–2018); Gliwice (2020)
- Teams: 8 (2006–2016); 6 (2017–2018); 4 (2020)
- Current champions: KTS Weszło Warsaw (1st title)
- Most championships: Lechia Gdańsk (4 titles)

The Amber Cup (also known as the Energa Cup for the 2015 edition) was a Polish indoor football tournament which took place in January, when the Polish football league had a winter break. The tournament which was first held at Hala Gryfia, Słupsk, in 2006, and held annually from 2008 until 2018. In 2016 the competition was held in the Ergo Arena, Gdańsk due to the capacity being much higher than that of Hala Gryfia, with the hall being the venue for the next three editions. After the tournament was cancelled for 2019 it returned again for a final time in January 2020, this time being hosted in Gliwice.

== Format ==
The tournament is played over 2 days. The first day sees a children's tournament of 16 teams. The teams are split into 4 groups of 4, with the top two teams playing in the knock-out stages.

The second day sees the men's teams play. This is a similar format but with only 2 groups. From 2006 to 2016 the 8 teams were split into groups of 4, and 2017–2018 the 6 teams were split into groups of 3. Each team plays each other once, with the top teams playing in a knockout stage before the 3rd place play-off and finals are played. The format was changed again with only 4 teams taking part in tournament for the 2020 edition.

== History ==
In the early years of its formation, the tournament was for amateur clubs or teams from the lower divisions of Polish football. The organisers wanted to mix sport with football and create an event of "great fun". As the Amber Cup was getting more popular bigger teams accepted invitations to compete in the tournament. Wisła Kraków was one of the first "big" teams to take part in the tournament, and won it in 2010. As Gdańsk and Gdynia were not too far from Słupsk it was a plan to invite one of the teams to take part in the near future to gain popularity with a bigger following in future events. Lechia Gdańsk first took part in 2011, and featured in every tournament from 2011 to 2018.

The Amber Cup is not just for the big teams, while the tournament grew, it saw a mix of amateur teams facing professional players. In 2012, 2014 and 2015 it was an amateur team which came out on top and won the tournament. In 2016 the venue for the tournament was moved from Słupsk to the Ergo Arena in Gdańsk. The new arena had a capacity of 15,000 and was the perfect place to see the tournament grow further in popularity. Since the move to Gdańsk, fewer amateur teams have been invited, with more teams from Northern Poland taking part which play in the second or third tiers. As the tournament got more competitive the bigger teams started taking more established senior players from their squad, instead of the younger or second-team players which used to take part in the tournament.

In January 2019 the Amber Cup was left out of the Ergo Arenas calendar. Tournament organisers announced that the tournament had been cancelled for 2019 & 2020, with the organisers using those two years to prepare for a better organised and greater advertised tournament. At the time it was unknown whether the Amber Cup would continue, albeit with a different format, or whether a new tournament will take its place.

Despite the future of the Amber Cup being uncertain, the tournament returned in 2020 with a new location in Gliwice. It was the first tournament since its early creation not to include any professional teams. The tournament was also the first of its kind to include a women's match, involving a game between Team Kiedrzynek and Team Pajor.

== Amber Cup Winners ==
=== Men's tournament ===
Edition	Year	Winner	Runners-up	Third place	Venue
I	2006	Data not found			Hala Gryfia, Słupsk
II	2008	Unia Szczecin	Team Słupsk II (Gryf Słupsk)	Team Słupsk (Gryf Słupsk)	Hala Gryfia, Słupsk
III	2009	Trójkolorowi Słupsk (Gryf Słupsk)	Forcars Słupsk	Unia Szczecin	Hala Gryfia, Słupsk
IV	2010	Wisła Kraków	Blue Moon Szczecin	Gryf Słupsk	Hala Gryfia, Słupsk
V	2011	Lechia Gdańsk	Śląsk Wrocław	Lambada Team	Hala Gryfia, Słupsk
VI	2012	Blue Moon Szczecin	Lechia Gdańsk	GKS Katowice	Hala Gryfia, Słupsk
VII	2013	Lechia Gdańsk	Puma All Star Team	Motor Lublin	Hala Gryfia, Słupsk
VIII	2014	Mściwoj Kartuzy	Team Adrian Mierzejewski	Football Factory	Hala Gryfia, Słupsk
IX	2015	Team Graham Sierakowice	Team Mariusz Piekarski	Lechia Gdańsk	Hala Gryfia, Słupsk
X	2016	Lechia Gdańsk	Football Factory	Podbeskidzie Bielsko-Biała	Ergo Arena, Gdańsk
XI	2017	Lechia Gdańsk	Śląsk Wrocław	Football Factory	Ergo Arena, Gdańsk
XII	2018	Wisła Płock	Miedź Legnica	Football Factory	Ergo Arena, Gdańsk
XIII	2020	KTS Weszło Warsaw	Poland Stars	Team Kamil Wilczek	Gliwice Arena, Gliwice

=== Team by performance ===
Club	Winner	Runners-up	Third place	Winning years
Lechia Gdańsk	4	1	1	2011, 2013, 2016, 2017
Gryf Słupsk	1	1	2	2009
Blue Moon Szczecin	1	1	-	2012
Unia Szczecin	1	-	1	2008
Wisła Kraków	1	-	-	2010
Mściwoj Kartuzy	1	-	-	2014
Team Graham Sierakowice	1	-	-	2015
Wisła Płock	1	-	-	2018
KTS Weszło Warsaw	1	-	-	2020
Śląsk Wrocław	-	2	-	-
Football Factory	-	1	3	-
Forcars Słupsk	-	1	-	-
Puma All Star Team	-	1	-	-
Team Adrian Mierzejewski	-	1	-	-
Team Mariusz Piekarski	-	1	-	-
Miedź Legnica	-	1	-	-
Poland Stars	-	1	-	-
Podbeskidzie Bielsko-Biała	-	-	1	-
Motor Lublin	-	-	1	-
GKS Katowice	-	-	1	-
Lambada Team	-	-	1	-
Team Kamil Wilczek	-	-	1	-

=== Women's tournament ===
There were no women's games before the thirteenth edition (XIII) of the tournament

Edition	Year	Winner	Runners-up	Venue
XIII	2020	Team Ewa Pajor	Team Katarzyna Kiedrzynek	Gliwice Arena, Gliwice
