= Paweł Zarzeczny =

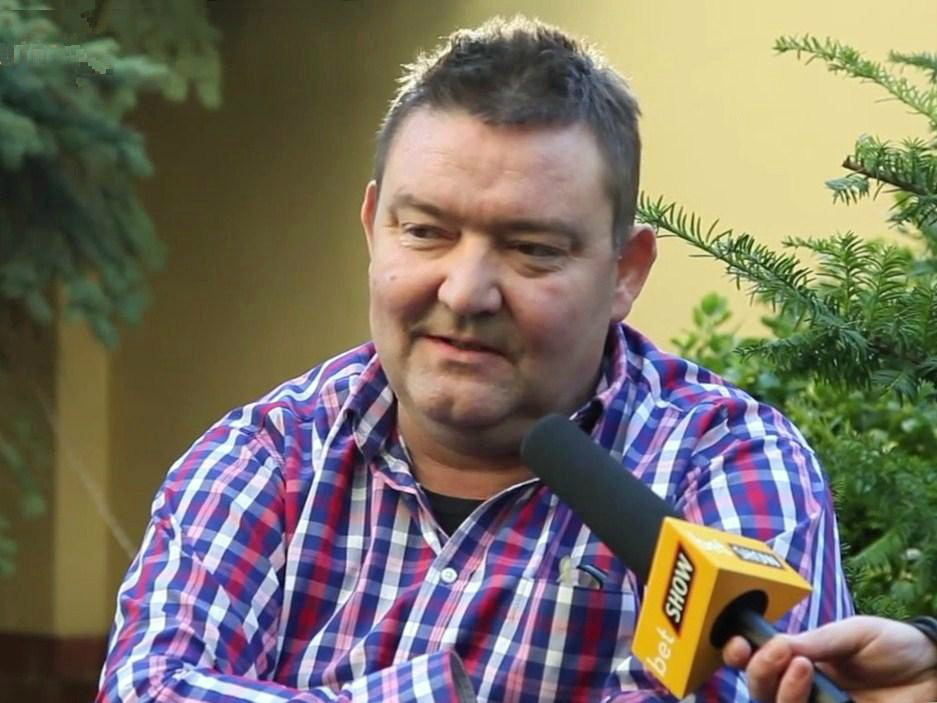
- Paweł Zarzeczny
- Born: 26 January 1961; Warsaw, Poland
- Died: 25 March 2017 (aged 56); Piaseczno, Poland
- Education: University of Warsaw
- Occupations: Sports journalist Columnist; TV personality
- Spouse: Małgorzata Zarzeczna

Paweł Andrzej Zarzeczny (26 January 1961 – 25 March 2017) was a Polish sports journalist, columnist and TV personality.

== Biography ==
=== Career ===
He was a graduate of the University of Warsaw. He started his journalistic career working for a weekly newspaper (then he was the deputy editor-in-chief). He also wrote for "Nowy Świat", "Super Express", "Fakt" and "Dziennik".

In 1989 he was the manager of the "Orły Górskiego" team at the European Championships in Denmark. He also published his articles and columns in "Gazeta Wyborcza", Wprost, The Supreme Time, as well as on Internet portals such as Wirtualna Polska, "Onet" or "Interia".

For some time he used pseudonyms River and Paolo River when writing. In the years 2001-2003 he was the deputy editor-in-chief of Przegląd Sportowy.

He worked at the sports editorial offices of TVP Polonia, TVP, Polsat, Vision Sport and Radio Zet. In 2008, he co-hosted the program The Slayer Hit on TV4 with Wiesław Kot. e is the author of many football books, Panini series albums, Polish Football History, Warsaw football monographs, Górski photography album, a collection of reports on Poles in foreign leagues. Together with Kazimierz Górski, he wrote a book titled "Piłka jest okrągła" (The ball is round"), which appeared in 2004 and was a biography of Kazimierz Górski.

In 2011, he published a collection of his columns published in the journal Polskatimes. From September 2013, on TVP Info, he hosted a programme with Jacek Cholewiński. He collaborated with the portal We are connected by passion and from Weszło, where he was a columnist, and from February 2015 he also owned a video blog on YouTube under the name One Man Show. The day before his death he recorded the 500th episode of the program. In September 2015, he published a column of articles titled "My Own Handwriting''.

From February 2016, he hosted live on TV Republika a proprietary program titled "Bul głowy" (literally "headache", but with a deliberate misspelling u instead of ó). The last episode was broadcast the day before his death.

Over the years of his professional career a prominent figure in Polish sports journalism. He was known for his expressive and direct opinions and worked for many major titles.

He died on 25 March 2017 of a heart attack. He was 56 years old. He was buried on 31 March 2017 at the Bródno Cemetery in Warsaw.

During the funeral ceremony, according to the will of the deceased, the song "Shape of my heart" by Sting was played, as well as "Chariots of fire" by Vangelis. The audience also sung Czesław Niemen's 'Dream of Warsaw'.

By order of the President of the Republic of Poland Andrzej Duda on 30 March 2017, in recognition of outstanding merits for sports journalism and for journalistic activity, he was posthumously awarded the Knight's Cross of the Order of Polonia Restituta.

== Private life ==
He was born in Warsaw. At the age of 7, he survived the family tragedy when his father killed his mother before his eyes and then committed suicide. He spent the rest of his childhood in an orphanage, and then he was raised by his uncle. He also had a sister.

In 2004, being under the influence of alcohol caused a car accident in which a motorcyclist was injured. The journalist for his act was sentenced to 1 year and 6 months imprisonment. For 4 years he was also denied driving license.

He had a daughter, Paulina, with his wife Małgorzata. From his previous relationship he had a son, Krzysztof.

== Publications ==
- 1992: Jedenastka miliarderów
- 2004: Piłka jest okrągła
- 2011: Zawsze byłem najlepszy
- 2015: Mój własny charakter pisma
