= Bray Wanderers F.C. =

Irish association football club

Bray Wanderers
- Full name: Bray Wanderers Football Club
- Nickname: The Seagulls
- Short name: Wanderers
- Founded: 1942; 84 years ago
- Ground: Carlisle Grounds, Bray, County Wicklow
- Capacity: 3,200
- Owner(s): Malachy Burke, JB Gough, David Goldstein
- Chairman: TBC
- Head Coach: Paul Heffernan
- League: League of Ireland First Division
- 2026: League of Ireland First Division, 3rd of 10
- Website: www.braywanderersfc.ie
Home colours	Away colours	Third colours

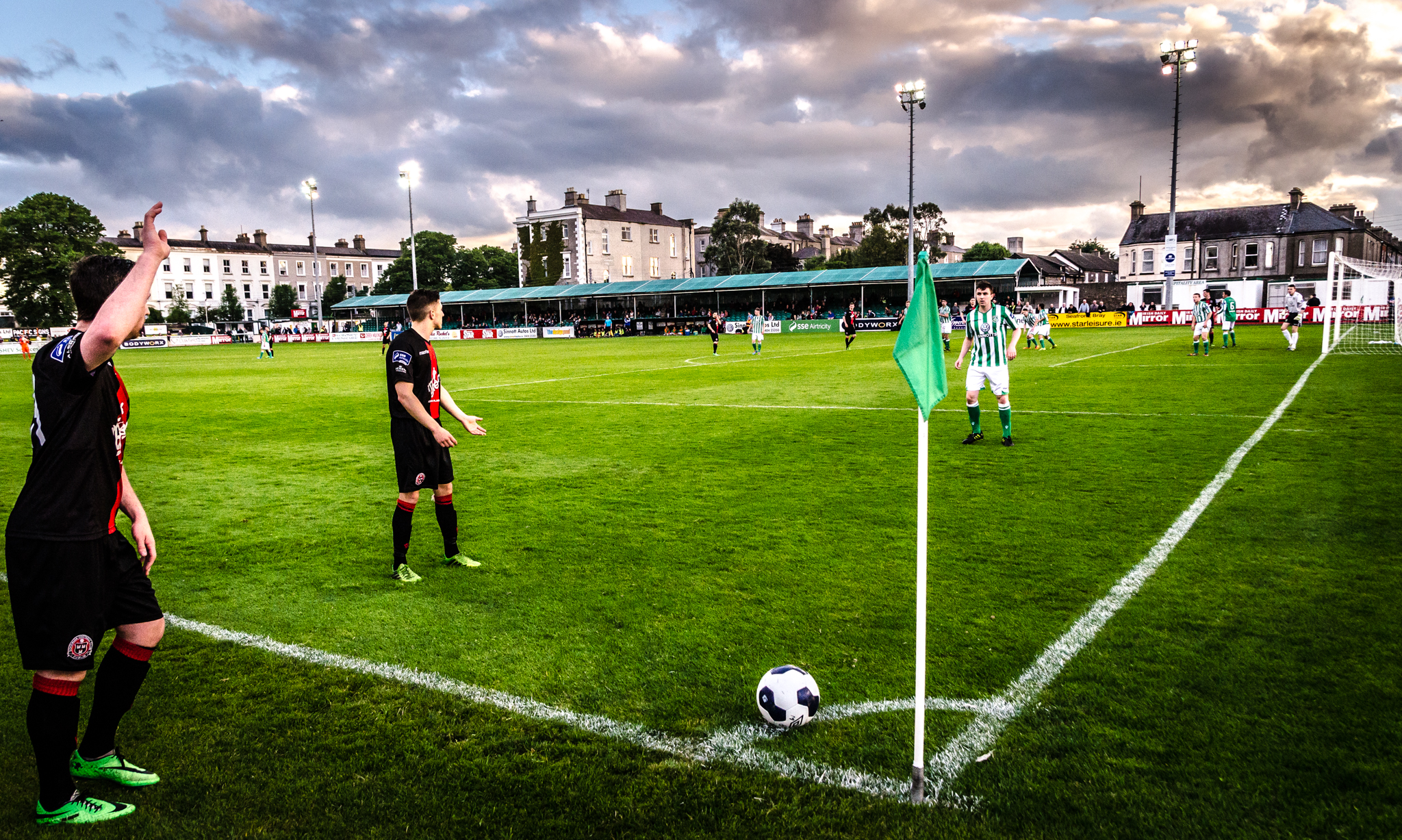
Carlisle Grounds, home of Bray Wanderers, 2024

Bray Wanderers Football Club are an Irish association football club playing in the League of Ireland First Division. The club in its present form was founded in 1942 in Bray, and was known until 2010 as Bray Wanderers A.F.C. It was elected to the league in 1985, and plays its home matches at the Carlisle Grounds. The club colours are green and white, and it goes by the nickname "The Seagulls".

== History ==
=== Early days ===
In 1922, some members of St Kevin's Gaelic football club in Bray left the club as a result of a dispute and formed a soccer club called Bray Wanderers. Through the 1930s and 1940s, however, Bray Unknowns were the leading team in the town, playing in the League of Ireland for nineteen seasons from 1924–25 to 1942–43. Bray Wanderers went into decline in the mid-thirties but was reformed in 1942–43 and entered the Athletic Union League Division 3 for the 1943–44 season. By the 1948–49 season Wanderers had reached Division 1 of the AUL but the period in between did not pass without controversy. In 1944 the club reached the Leinster Football Association Shield final but was disqualified for fielding an illegal player in the semi-final. When in Division 2 of the AUL in 1946–47 the club was expelled from the league due to the B team not fulfilling a league fixture, although the club was reinstated the following season. Wanderers won the Junior Cup in 1950-51 and again in 1953–54, defeating Ierne 1–0 in the Final. The following season Wanderers left the AUL and joined the Leinster Senior League.

=== Mid 1900s ===
In 1955–56 Wanderers won the FAI Intermediate Cup, defeating Workmens Club 2–1 in the final. There was also a first appearance in the FAI Cup against Longford Town in 1956. They won the FAI Intermediate Cup again two years later, defeating Chapelizod 2–1 in the final. In 1964–65 they were founder members of the League of Ireland B Division. However they left after just one season and once again went into decline. By 1973 Bray Unknowns were playing in the LSL and the management changed the name to Bray Wanderers in a partially successful effort to amalgamate the two.

=== League of Ireland ===
Chart of yearly table positions for Bray Wanderers in League of Ireland

Bray Wanderers were elected to the League of Ireland when it was expanded to two Divisions for the 1985–86 season. They played their first game as a League of Ireland club on 8 September 1985 in a FAI League Cup match against Dundalk with Jim Mahon scoring the club's first goal at senior level. The Wanderers' secured promotion to the Premier Division by winning the League of Ireland First Division Championship that year. They were relegated back down to the First Division in the 1987–88 season. Wanderers did not regain Premier Division status until the 1990–91 season but had their first major success during their spell in the First Division. They won the FAI Cup in 1990 beating St Francis 3–0 in the first Lansdowne Road final with John Ryan becoming only the second player to score a hat-trick in a FAI Cup final. They made history by becoming the first ever First Division side to win the trophy. Due to this cup win, Wanderers competed in European competition, for the first time in their history in the 1990–91 season. They were defeated, however, by Trabzonspor in the European Cup Winners' Cup preliminary round.

After two seasons in the Premier Division, the club was once again relegated to the First Division where they remained for three seasons. In 1995–96 season, Wanderers were promoted back to the Premier Division as First Division champions, but were relegated back down in the following season. The next two seasons followed a similar pattern as they went back up and came straight back down. In 1998–99, a season they got relegated again, Wanderers won their second FAI Cup, defeating Finn Harps after two replays which earned them a spot in the 1999-2000 UEFA Cup against a Roy Hodgson led Grasshoppers.

In 1999–00, the club won promotion back to the Premier Division, and in 2000–01 Wanderers achieved their highest ever league finish of 4th place in the Premier Division. The club could not build on this as they were relegated back down in 2002–03 but were once again promoted in 2004. The club was relegated at the end of the 2009 season, but the demise of Cork City F.C. meant they were reinstated to the Premier Division. Finishing in a promotion/relegation play-off in 2010, the club maintained its Premier status following a penalty shoot-out with Monaghan United.

The following season, finishing sixth in the Premier Division, the club gained a place in the all-Ireland Setanta Cup, but early in 2012 conceded home and away matches to Glentoran FC in the first round of the competition (2–4 & 0–3).

In the 2012 season, Bray finished tenth of 12 clubs in the Premier Division, five points above Dundalk, who had to survive a promotion/relegation battle against Waterford United to ensure their survival in the top flight.

In 2013, Bray were again in the relegation mix, and having finished second-last they played First Division promotion play-off winners Longford Town over two legs, winning 5–4 on aggregate.

On 10 January 2014, it was announced that Alan Mathews would be the new manager with Barry O'Connor as his assistant. The club ended the season in tenth place, just one point above UCD, and entered the 2015 season as the fourth-longest surviving Premier Division club.

=== 2015: Five managers in one season ===
The club had five first team managers in total across the 2015 season. On 1 April 2015, Mathews resigned suddenly, together with the rest of his backroom team, citing a breakdown in communication with the club's new owners: Gerry Mulvey & Denis O'Connor, who had taken over during the off-season. The club appointed Under-19 coach Maciej Tarnogrodzki as interim senior team manager the following day. The following month, the club announced that former Shamrock Rovers boss Trevor Croly had signed a three-year contract to manage the club.

Just one month later however, Croly also resigned in a similar fashion to Mathews before him. Mick Cooke was brought in to replace him as the fifth manager of the season (including temporary Player/Manager David Cassidy), and Bray finished the 2015 season in 8th position.

=== 2016 - 2021 ===
In July 2017, after much speculation about the future of the club, majority shareholder and interim chairman Gerry Mulvey released a statement which confirmed that the club was financially stable and outlined big plans for the future of the club. The statement was widely ridiculed, mainly due to its branding of Wicklow County Council as "the North Korea of Ireland for business" after the council's repeated refusal to allow the Carlisle Grounds to be rezoned.

In September 2017, the FAI launched an investigation into alleged match-fixing surrounding Bray Wanderers friendly against Waterford on 8 September 2017. The FAI released a formal statement in February 2018 affirming that no evidence to support any charge had been found.

The 2018 season went badly for Bray, with the club losing 28 of their 36 league matches and exiting every cup competition at the first time of asking. The financial situation was not any better, with players voting to strike due to unpaid wages and medical costs. The players were eventually paid before the strike went ahead. On 26 July 2018, after several weeks of speculation over Bray's future, the club was taken over by St. Joseph's Boys academy director Niall O'Driscoll. Mulvey remained in a minority role. Bray were officially relegated to the League of Ireland First Division in October 2018, ending a 12-year stay in the top flight of Irish football.

=== Merger with Cabinteely ===
In November 2021, Bray Wanderers and Cabinteely F.C. announced a merger, technically a takeover of Wanderers by Cabinteely. The newly created team would be known as Bray Wanderers and continue to play in the Carlisle Grounds, with the intention to apply for a First Division licence. Bray's former manager Pat Devlin returned for his second spell in the post, and the then Director of Football (DoF) at Cabinteely became the DoF for the new Bray Wanderers.

Since the merger and Devlin's return to Bray Wanderers, there have been a number of conflicts. One such incident saw Devlin and fans engage in an "ugly exchange" at an away fixture against Wexford FC. There was even a substantial drop in attendance at the Carlisle Grounds at one point, as Bray experienced one of the worst seasons in their history, going from a title challenging side to one near the bottom of the table. In mid-2022, club chairman Tony Richardson reportedly stated that the club were "making progress" in "eliminating crowd trouble which [..] marred some of their games this season", and the club stated that it had appointed a "Fan Liaison Officer [..] for dialogue with fans who wish to make their point". A report in the Bray People, after the clubs's eighth home league defeat of the season, referred to a "lack of goals" and a video reputedly showing "people throwing pyrotechnics [..] over the walls of the Carlisle Grounds". With a 5–1 home defeat in Bray's final home game of the 2022 season to Cobh Ramblers, the season ended with a 18.75% win record, among the worst season performances in the club's history.

=== 2022 – present ===
In November 2022, former Wexford FC manager Ian Ryan was appointed as head coach, with Devlin remaining as "Head of Football". In March 2023, Bray progressed to the semi-final of the Leinster Senior Cup with a 2–1 victory over reigning League of Ireland Premier Division champions Shamrock Rovers. Bray Wanderers were eliminated by LSL side Usher Celtic and slipped to a 7th-place finish in the First Division.

Bray started the 2024 season poorly with one win from the opening 8 games. In May 2024, Ian Ryan unexpectedly resigned as manager with Bray in 6th place. Assistants Lorcan Fitzgerald and Paul Heffernan took charge of the club and oversaw an upturn in results, raising Bray to third in the table. On September 10, Lorcan Fitzgerald also resigned from management leaving Paul Heffernan in sole charge. Bray ended the 2024 regular season in 5th place earning the last play-off position. In the promotion semi-final Bray beat UCD 2–1 on aggregate over two legs after winning the opening leg 2–0 at home. In November, Bray faced Athlone Town in the promition play-off final at Dalymount Park. After going 2–0 down early on Bray pulled one back through Conor Knight's deflected shot before Cole Omorehiomwan scored a last minute header to level at 2–2 and force extratime. After a goalless extratime, goalkeeper Jimmy Corcoran saved two penalties as Bray won 4–2 on penalties to advance to the promotion/relegation final. In front of over 5,000 spectators, Bray lost 3–1 to Drogheda United at Tallaght Stadium ending their promotion hopes.

Early in 2025, Bray Wanderers announced a partnership with Next Level Soccer, a football club and youth academy in the United States. On 30 June 2025, Bray Wanderers came back to win the 2025-26 Leinster Senior Cup 2-1 at home over St. Pat's in the final, with Conor Knight scoring in the 37' and Richard Ferizaj in the 56' after Sam Rooney had scored in the 25' for St. Pat's. This capped off a undefeated Leinster Senior Cup season for Bray, which included wins over fellow-First Division side Wexford 2-1, also a comeback, at home, a 3-1 win over Premier Divison side Bohemians FC, also at home, and a scoreless draw in Finglas with Finglas United FC to win their group on goals scored before going on to beat Premier Division side Drogheda United FC 6-5 in penalties after tying 1-1 in regulation, a 2-1 away win in Finglas (Finglas had beat Shamrock Rovers 3-1 away in the quarterfinals) that was once again a comeback, before the aforementioned finals victory against the Saints.

Wanderers finished third in the 2026 season, and won both fixtures in their playoff tie with Kerry FC, winning the first leg 2-1 in Tralee, and a 3-0 win at home.

== Ownership ==
On Friday 26 November 2021, Bray Wanderers merger with Cabinteely was officially announced with Cabinteely chairman Tony Richardson becoming majority shareholder of Bray Wanderers.

In March 2025, a US-based company named 'Next-Level Sports' entered a partnership with Bray Wanderers and became part-owners.

In September 2025, the club was transferred to an ownership consortium of Malachy Burke, JB Gough, and David Goldstein.

== Supporters ==
Bray Wanderers has maintained a small, but loyal fanbase through the years, with average attendances currently around 800–1200.

Levels of support have fluctuated over the years. Lows of 271 fans in attendance where recorded in the relegation season of 2018. Attendance also dropped significantly following the clubs merger with Cabinteely in 2022. However, average crowds have also reached over 1000 supporters at times during the 2019 season and regularly in 2025.

In March 2008, the Ultra group of Bray Wanderers fans, "Na Fánaithe", was formed by five members of the supporters club. Unlike similar groups in Dublin, such as "Briogáid Dearg", "SRFC Ultras", "Shed End Invincibles" and "Notorious Boo Boys", Na Fánaithe is a much smaller group.

In July 2022, Bray Wanderers fans formed a new supporters club, the "1985 Seagulls" group.

For away matches, supporters clubs usually organise a bus to run direct to the relevant ground. The Bray Wanderers Supporters Club operated this service for a number of years until it stopped in 2022. Since 2022, the 1985 Seagulls group have taken over the running of this service.

== Honours ==
- FAI Cup: 2
  - 1990, 1999
- League of Ireland First Division: 3
  - 1985–86, 1995–96, 1999–2000
- League of Ireland First Division Shield: 1
  - 1995–96
- Leinster Senior Cup: 1
  - 2025–26
- Leinster Senior League: 3
  - 1957–58, 1958–59, 1959–60
- FAI Intermediate Cup: 2
  - 1955–56, 1957–58
- FAI Junior Cup: 2
  - 1950–51, 1953–54
- Enda McGuill Cup: 1
  - 2005

== Records ==
=== Most appearances ===
#	Name	Seasons	Appearances
1	(Republic of Ireland) Colm Tresson	1990-1992, 1998-2012	441
2	(Republic of Ireland) Kieran 'Tarzan' O'Brien	1993-2006	374
3	(Republic of Ireland) Alan Smyth	1988-1995, 1996 - 2000	353
4	(Republic of Ireland) Anthony 'Bo' McKeever	1985-1993, 1995-2000	352
5	(Republic of Ireland) Mick Doohan	1988-1993, 1998-2003	343

=== Most goals scored ===
#	Name	Seasons	Goals
1	(Republic of Ireland) Jason Byrne	1998-2003, 2012-2013	95
2	(Republic of Ireland) Kieran 'Tarzan' O'Brien	1993-2006	90
3	(Republic of Ireland) Colm Tresson	1990-1992, 1998-2012	74
4	(Republic of Ireland) Eamon Zayed	2002-2006	59
5	(Republic of Ireland) Richie Parsons	1988–1991, 1995–1999, 2001–2002	55

=== Club records ===
- Record victory: 7–0 v Cobh Ramblers 17 October 1997, 7–0 v St. Mochta's 2007 FAI Cup, 17 June 2007
- Record league defeat: 8–1 v Dundalk 4 May 2015
- Most points in a league season: 72 in 1999–00
- Most league goals in a season: 19, Eamon Zayed, 2003
- Most league goals: 72, Jason Byrne 1998–03, 2012–13

== European record ==
=== Overview ===
Competition	Matches	W	D	L	GF	GA
UEFA Cup	2	0	0	2	0	8
European Cup Winners' Cup	2	0	1	1	1	3
Overall	4	0	1	3	1	11

=== Matches ===
Season	Competition	Round	Opponent	Home	Away	Aggregate
1990–91	European Cup Winners' Cup	QR	(Turkey) Trabzonspor	1–1	0–2	1–3
1999–00	UEFA Cup	QR	(Switzerland) Grasshoppers	0–4	0–4	0–8

== Current squad ==
Note: Flags indicate national team as defined under FIFA eligibility rules; some limited exceptions apply. Players may hold more than one non-FIFA nationality.

No.	Pos.	Nation	Player
1	GK	IRL	Jimmy Corcoran (captain)
2	MF	IRL	Alain Kizenga
3	DF	IRL	Benjamin Fagbemi
4	DF	IRL	Jamie Duggan
6	MF	SLE	John Sesay
7	MF	IRL	Conor Knight
10	MF	IRL	Richard Ferizaj
11	FW	NGR	Ifunanyachi Achara
12	DF	IRL	Declan Osagie (on loan from Bohemians)
13	GK	IRL	Rian Hogan
14	MF	COD	Aime Azende
15	MF	IRL	Ryan Kelly
16	MF	USA	Kyle Tucker
17	MF	IRL	Ajibola Oluwabiyi

No.	Pos.	Nation	Player
18	MF	IRL	Ben McCormack
19	MF	IRL	Zak Reddy
20	FW	IRL	Tyreik Sammy (on loan from Shelbourne)
21	FW	ALB	Endri Mustali
22	DF	IRL	Jack Lawless
23	MF	IRL	Jamie Ryan
24	MF	IRL	Philip Cooney
25	GK	IRL	Stephen McGuinness
27	MF	IRL	Dean O'Shea
28	FW	IRL	Cristiano Bramley
29	FW	IRL	Promise Akinyemi
30	MF	IRL	Ethan Cheese
33	DF	IRL	Bailey Shelley

== Technical staff ==
As of 2026, the club's technical staff included:

Position	Staff
Head coach	Paul Heffernan
Assistant head coach	Gavin Teehan
First team coach	Graham Kelly
Goalkeeping coach	Stephen McGuinness
Director of athletic performance	Paul McGrath
Academy director	Áine O'Gorman

== Managers ==
Dates	Name	Notes
July 1985 – December 90	(Republic of Ireland) Pat Devlin	League of Ireland First Division Champions 1985–86, FAI Cup Winners 1990
December 1990 – March 95	(Republic of Ireland) John Holmes	First Division Runner-up 1990–91
March 1995 – August 95	(Republic of Ireland) Pat Devlin	First Division Champions 1995–96, 1999–00, FAI Cup Winners 1999, First Division Runner-up 1997–98, 2003
August 2005 – October 2005	(Republic of Ireland) Tony McGuirk (Note: In absence of Devlin for medical reasons)	
October 2005 – 10 May 2006	(Republic of Ireland) Pat Devlin	
10 May 2006 – 26 September 2006	(Republic of Ireland) Tony McGuirk (Note: In absence of Devlin with Republic of Ireland B Team)	
27 September 2006 – 9 August 2010	(Republic of Ireland) Eddie Gormley	
10 August 2010 – December 2011	(Republic of Ireland) Pat Devlin (Note: With Keith Long)	
1 December 2011 – 15 September 2012	(Republic of Ireland) Keith Long	
16 September 2012 – 31 December 2012	(Republic of Ireland) Eddie Gormley (Note: With Pat Devlin)	
1 January 2012 – December 2013	(Republic of Ireland) Pat Devlin	
10 January 2014 – 1 April 2015	(Republic of Ireland) Alan Mathews	
Caretaker 2 April 2015 – 6 May 2015	(Poland) Maciej Tarnogrodzki	
11 May 2015 – 3 July 2015	(Republic of Ireland) Trevor Croly	
7 July 2015 – April 2016	(Republic of Ireland) Mick Cooke	
April 2016 – October 2017	(Republic of Ireland) Harry Kenny	
Dec 2017 – April 2018	(Republic of Ireland) Dave Mackey	
8 June 2018 – 18 July 2018	(Republic of Ireland) Martin Russell	
7 August 2018 – 2 December 2021	(Republic of Ireland) Gary Cronin	
26 November 2021 - 15 November 2022	(Republic of Ireland) Pat Devlin	Officially "Head of Football" rather than manager.
15 November 2022 – 22 May 2024	(Republic of Ireland) Ian Ryan	
22 May 2024 – 10 September 2024	(Republic of Ireland) Lorcan Fitzgerald	Interim
10 September 2024 – 1 December 2024	(Republic of Ireland) Paul Heffernan	Interim
2 December 2024 – Present	(Republic of Ireland) Paul Heffernan	Leinster Senior Cup Winners 2025-26
