= Richie Parsons =

Irish footballer

Personal information
- Date of birth: 5 May 1970 (age 56)
- Place of birth: Dublin, Republic of Ireland
- Position: Forward

Senior career*
Years	Team	Apps	(Gls)
1988–1991	Bray Wanderers	42	(9)
1991–1992	Athlone Town	24	(2)
1992–1993	Longford Town	19	(15)
1992–1993	Monaghan United	3	(0)
1993–1994	Longford Town	25	(11)
1994–1995	Finn Harps	21	(7)
1995–1999	Bray Wanderers	100	(36)
1999–2000	Longford Town	34	(13)
2000–2001	Athlone Town	4	(0)
2000–2001	Home Farm	26	(7)
2001–2002	Bray Wanderers	1	(0)
Total		299	(100)
- * Club domestic league appearances and goals

Richie Parsons is an Irish former footballer during the 1990s and 2000s and is one of only 42 players to score 100 goals.

He made a scoring debut for Bray against Shamrock Rovers in the Leinster Senior Cup on 24 August 1988 His first of 100 league goals came on the opening day of the 1989–90 League of Ireland First Division season at Monaghan. Parsons made 2 substitute appearances against Trabzonspor in the 1990–91 European Cup Winners' Cup.

On 20 March 1994 Parsons scored 4 for Longford Town against St James's Gate F.C. The 1995–96 League of Ireland season was a rewarding one for Parsons and Bray. On the opening night Wanderers hammered Monaghan United 5–1 at Gortakeegan with Parsons scoring the very first league hat trick for a Bray Wanderers player. He scored a total of 55 goals in his 3 spells at the Carlisle Grounds.
