= Merveille Fundambu =

Congolese footballer

Personal information
- Full name: Merveille Fundambu
- Date of birth: 13 November 1999 (age 26)
- Place of birth: Kinshasa, DR Congo
- Height: 1.80 m (5 ft 11 in)
- Position: Midfielder

Team information
- Current team: Bosna Neuchâtel

Youth career
- Iseka

Senior career*
Years	Team	Apps	(Gls)
2014–2017	Elonga		
2017–2019	Etanchéité		
2019–2020	KTS Weszło	17	(7)
2020	→ Radomiak Radom (loan)	10	(0)
2020–2021	Widzew Łódź	14	(1)
2021–2022	Stomil Olsztyn	26	(3)
2023	Polonus Kazimierz Biskupi	6	(2)
2024	LKS Ślesin	10	(4)
2024–	Bosna Neuchâtel		
- * Club domestic league appearances and goals as of 9 April 2026

Merveille Fundambu (born 13 November 1999) is a Congolese footballer who plays as a midfielder.

== Club career ==
=== Early career ===
Fundambu began his career in his native Democratic Republic of the Congo, playing for Iseka, Elonga and Etanchéité.

=== KTS Weszło ===
On 18 May 2019, he joined Polish Klasa B side KTS Weszło. On 19 May 2019, he made his debut in a 5–0 victory over AP Brychczy Warsaw, and scored his first goal for the club. On 14 August 2019, he made his debut in the Masovian Polish Cup, in a match against Bednarska Warsaw with a goal scored (resulting in a 11–2 victory).

=== Radomiak Radom ===
On 8 January 2020, he was loaned to I liga side Radomiak Radom. On 2 March Fundambu made his I liga debut, coming on as a substitute for Leândro in a 3–0 defeat against Warta Poznań. He played in 10 games, including the 2019–20 I liga promotion play-off against Warta Poznań (0–2). His loan expired in August 2020.

=== Widzew Łódź ===
On 21 August 2020, he joined I liga side Widzew Łódź on a free transfer. He made his debut on 29 August 2020 in a I liga match against his former club Radomiak Radom, playing 69 minutes as Widzew lost 1–4. On 19 September 2020, he scored his first I liga goal in a Widzew's 2–0 victory over Stomil Olsztyn. On 25 November 2020, he made his Polish Cup debut, in a 1–0 home defeat to Legia Warsaw. After regular performances in the autumn and winter of 2020, Fundambu unexpectedly dropped out of the squad and played only one match in 2021, the last 9 minutes of the 3–0 loss against Zagłębie Sosnowiec. His contract expired after the 2020–21 season.

=== Stomil Olsztyn ===
On 6 July 2021, it was announced that Fundambu had signed a one-year contract with Stomil Olsztyn. In his debut on 1 August 2021, in a I liga match against Chrobry Głogów, he scored his first goal, but did not save the club from a 2–1 defeat.

=== Temporary retirement and return to Poland ===
In the summer of 2022, he retired from professional football and moved to Belgium. After spending several months abroad, he joined Polish V liga side Polonus Kazimierz Biskupi ahead of the 2022–23 spring round.

== Career statistics ==
As of 25 June 2024

Club	Season	League			Polish Cup		Other		Total	
Club	Season	Division	Apps	Goals	Apps	Goals	Apps	Goals	Apps	Goals
KTS Weszło	2018–19	Klasa B	4	4	0	0	0	0	4	4
KTS Weszło	2019–20	Klasa A	13	3	4	4	0	0	17	7
KTS Weszło	Total		17	7	4	4	0	0	21	11
Radomiak Radom (loan)	2019–20	I liga	10	0	0	0	0	0	10	0
Widzew Łódź	2020–21	I liga	14	1	1	0	0	0	15	1
Stomil Olsztyn	2021–22	I liga	26	3	2	0	0	0	28	3
Polonus Kamieniec Polski	2022–23	V liga	6	2	—		—		6	2
LKS Ślesin	2023–24	V liga	10	4	—		—		10	4
Career total			83	17	7	4	0	0	90	21

== Honours ==
Weszło Warsaw

- Klasa B Warsaw III: 2018–19

LKS Ślesin

- V liga Greater Poland II: 2023–24
