= Patryk Stępiński =

Polish footballer

Personal information
- Date of birth: 16 January 1995 (age 31)
- Place of birth: Łódź, Poland
- Height: 1.78 m (5 ft 10 in)
- Position: Full-back

Team information
- Current team: Resovia

Youth career
- UKS SMS Łódź

Senior career*
Years	Team	Apps	(Gls)
2011–2014	Widzew Łódź	25	(0)
2014–2020	Wisła Płock	101	(0)
2020	Warta Poznań	7	(0)
2020–2024	Widzew Łódź	100	(4)
2024	Ruch Chorzów	13	(0)
2024–2025	Chania	9	(0)
2025	Lokomotiv Plovdiv	16	(0)
2025–2026	Miedź Legnica	22	(2)
2026–	Resovia	0	(0)

International career
2010	Poland U15	6	(0)
2011	Poland U16	6	(0)
2012	Poland U17	14	(0)
2013	Poland U18	1	(0)
2014–2015	Poland U19	10	(0)
2015–2016	Poland U20	6	(0)
- * Club domestic league appearances and goals as of 14:57, 29 May 2026 (UTC)

Patryk Stępiński (born 16 January 1995) is a Polish professional footballer who plays as a full-back for II liga club Resovia.

== Club career ==
On 1 September 2020, Stępiński returned to Widzew Łódź. In 2024, he joined Ruch Chorzów on a free transfer. He left the club on 1 July 2024.

Stępiński moved abroad for the first time in his career in August 2024, when he joined Greek club Chania. On 31 January 2025, after making 10 appearances across all competitions, his contract with Chania was terminated by mutual consent.

On 5 February 2025, Stępiński joined Bulgarian club Lokomotiv Plovdiv on a deal until the end of the season.

On 14 August 2025, Stępiński signed a season-long contract with I liga club Miedź Legnica, where he was reunited with his former Ruch and Widzew manager Janusz Niedźwiedź. On 28 May 2026, Miedź announced they would not be renewing Stępiński's contract. In total, he made 24 appearances for the club in all competitions, scoring two goals.

On 1 October 2026, Stępiński signed with II liga side Resovia until the end of the season.
