= Klasa C =

- Country: Poland
- Confederation: UEFA
- Level on pyramid: 9
- Promotion to: Klasa B
- Domestic cup: Polish Cup

Klasa C represents the ninth and lowest level of the Polish football hierarchy. The existence of the Klasa C is not common in Poland. In the 2020–21 season, the above-mentioned league existed only in the Lesser Poland and Silesian voivodeships. Teams promoted from Klasa C move up to Klasa B.

From 2008 to 2010, the Klasa C was the tenth level in the Lesser Poland.
