= Patryk Mucha =

Polish footballer (born 1997)

Personal information
- Date of birth: 11 September 1997 (age 29)
- Place of birth: Głogów, Poland
- Height: 1.78 m (5 ft 10 in)
- Position: Midfielder

Team information
- Current team: Odra Bytom Odrzański

Youth career
- Tęcza Krosno Odrzańskie
- –2013: UKP Zielona Góra
- 2013–2017: Zagłębie Lubin

Senior career*
Years	Team	Apps	(Gls)
2013–2019	Zagłębie Lubin II	89	(12)
2017–2020	Zagłębie Lubin	2	(0)
2019–2020	→ Górnik Polkowice (loan)	27	(2)
2020–2022	Widzew Łódź	48	(5)
2022–2025	Chrobry Głogów	92	(5)
2023	Chrobry Głogów II	1	(1)
2025–2026	Zagłębie Sosnowiec	7	(0)
2026–	Odra Bytom Odrzański	0	(0)
- * Club domestic league appearances and goals as of 09:36, 31 May 2026 (UTC)

Patryk Mucha (born 11 September 1997) is a Polish professional footballer who plays as a midfielder for III liga club Odra Bytom Odrzański.

== Career ==
=== Zagłębie Lubin ===
Mucha joined Zagłębie Lubin in 2013. On 2 September 2019, he was loaned out to Górnik Polkowice for the 2019–20 season.

=== Widzew Łódź ===
On 10 August 2020, he signed a two-year deal with Widzew Łódź. On 23 May 2022, it was announced his contract would not be extended.

=== Chrobry Głogów ===
On 20 June 2022, Mucha joined I liga side Chrobry Głogów on a two-year deal.

=== Zagłębie Sosnowiec ===
On 2 July 2025, Mucha agreed to a two-year contract with II liga club Zagłębie Sosnowiec.

=== Odra Bytom Odrzański ===
In June 2026, Mucha moved to Odra Bytom Odrzański, recently promoted to III liga.

== Honours ==
Zagłębie Lubin II

- IV liga Lower Silesia West: 2016–17
- Polish Cup (Lower Silesia regionals): 2016–17
- Polish Cup (Legnica regionals): 2013–14, 2016–17
