= IV liga Masovia =

- Organising body: Masovian Football Association
- Founded: 2000; 26 years ago
- Country: Poland
- Number of clubs: 18
- Level on pyramid: 5
- Promotion to: III liga, group I
- Relegation to: V liga Masovia
- Current champions: KTS Weszło (1st title) (2025–26)
- Sponsor(s): Decathlon

IV liga Masovia (grupa mazowiecka), also known as Decathlon IV liga mazowiecka for sponsorship reasons, is one of the groups of IV liga, the fifth level of Polish football league system.

The league was created in the 2000–01 season, after a new administrative division of Poland was implemented. Until the end of the 2007–08 season, IV liga was the fourth tier of league system, but this was changed with the formation of the Ekstraklasa as the top level league in Poland.

The clubs from Masovian Voivodeship compete in the group. The winner is promoted to III liga, group I. The bottom teams are relegated to the groups of Masovian group of the V liga.

== Season 2008–09 ==
IV liga became the fifth level of Polish football league system due to the formation of Ekstraklasa as the top level league in Poland.

== Season 2019–20 ==
Group North

The 2019–20 season did not reassume in March 2020 after the winter break, because of the COVID-19 pandemic in Poland. A select few matches were played in June 2020 to decide promotion.

1. Drukarz Warsaw 	 	18 	12 	5 	1 	32-14 	41 	
2. Huragan Wołomin 	18  11 	6 	1 	39-14 	39 	
3. Mazovia Mińsk Mazowiecki        	18 10 	2 	6 	46-27 	32 	
4. Hutnik Warsaw 	 	18 	10 	2 	6 	43-29 	32 	
5. KS Łomianki 	 	15 	8 	5 	2 	29-18 	29 	
6. MKS Przasnysz 	 	15 	8 	4 	3 	33-10 	28 	
7. Ząbkovia Ząbki 	 	15 	8 	2 	5 	39-20 	26 	
8. Pogoń Siedlce II	 	15 	7 	3 	5 	23-19 	24 	
9. Wisła Płock II 	 	15 	5 	4 	6 	27-25 	19 	
10. Makowianka Maków Mazowiecki 15 	4 	5 	6 	26-39 	17 	
11. Wkra Żuromin 	 	15 	4 	3 	8 	26-40 	15 	
12. Nadnarwianka Pułtusk 	15 	2 	6 	7 	16-28 	12 	
13. Korona Ostrołęka 	 	15 	2 	5 	8 	13-29 	11 	
14. Podlasie Sokołów Podlaski 	15 	2 	4 	9 	16-33 	10 	
15. Świt Staroźreby 	 	15 	2 	4 	9 	15-29 	10 	
16. Ożarowianka Ożarów Mzwck. 	15 	1 	0 	14 	11-60 	3

Group South

The 2019–20 season did not reassume in March 2020 after the winter break, because of the COVID-19 pandemic in Poland. A select few matches were played in June 2020 to decide promotion.

1. Błonianka Błonie 		17 	12 	2 	3 	52-20 	38 	(promoted)
2. MKS Piaseczno 		17 	10 	5 	2 	48-25 	35
3. Radomiak Radom II 		15 	9 	5 	1 	27-13 	32
4. Victoria Sulejówek 		17 	10 	1 	6 	45-28 	31
5. Pilica Białobrzegi 		15 	8 	3 	4 	37-24 	27 	
6. Oskar Przysucha 		15 	7 	5 	3 	36-27 	26
7. Wilga Garwolin 		15 	7 	2 	6 	30-32 	23
8. Mszczonowianka Mszczonów 	15 	6 	4 	5 	23-22 	22
9. KS Warka 			15 	4 	5 	6 	19-37 	17
10. KS Raszyn 			15 	5 	2 	8 	20-27 	17
11. Mazur Karczew 		15 	4 	3 	8 	19-23 	15
12. Proch Pionki 		15 	4 	3 	8 	18-25 	15
13. Znicz Pruszków II		15 	4 	3 	8 	17-29 	15
14. Żyrardowianka Żyrardów 	15 	3 	3 	9 	20-34 	12
15. Józefovia Józefów 		15 	2 	4 	9 	11-28 	10
16. Unia Warsaw 		15 	1 	4 	10 	8-36 	7
