= Grzegorz Szamotulski =

Polish footballer

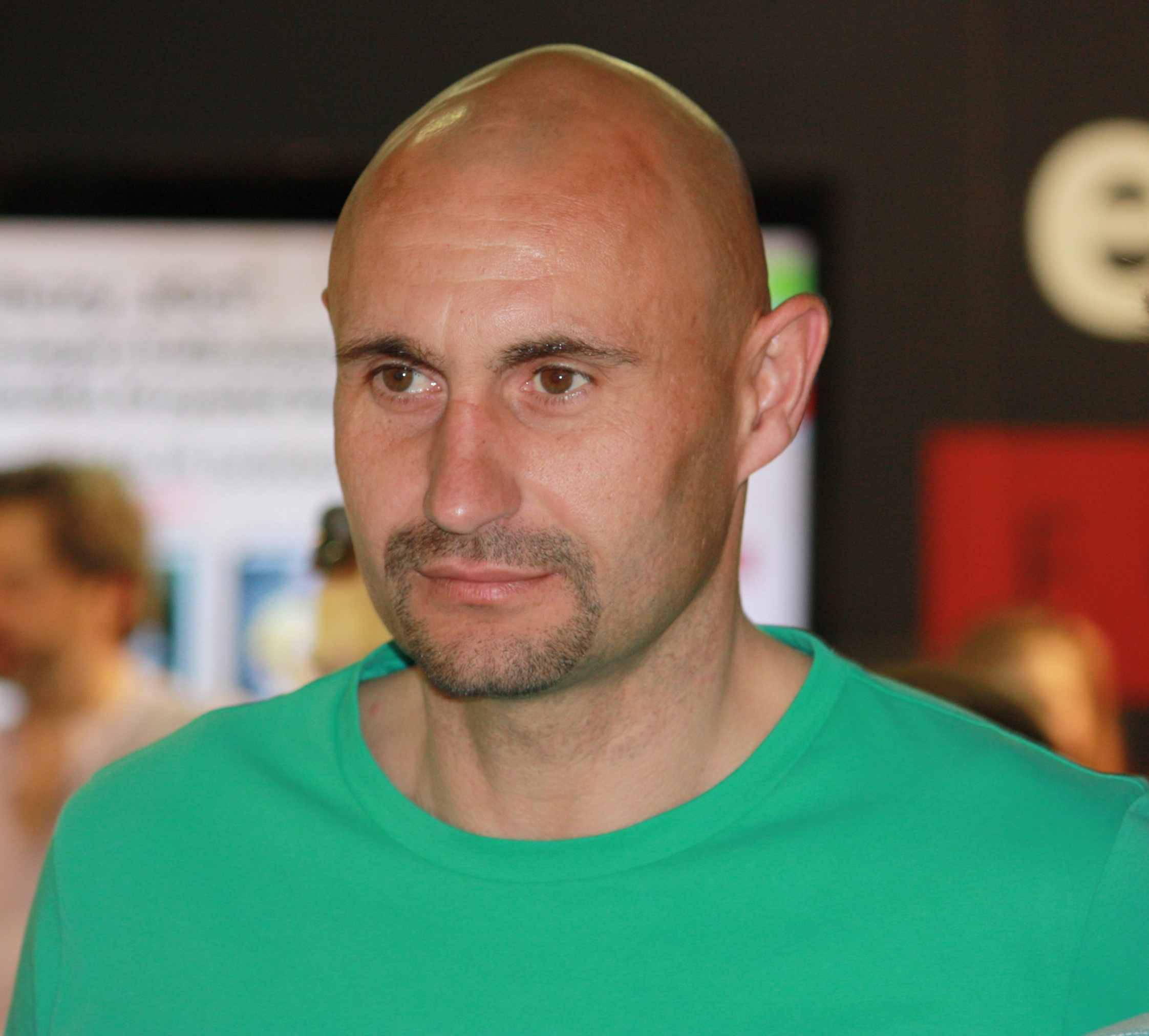
- Szamotulski in 2014

Personal information
- Date of birth: 13 May 1976 (age 50)
- Place of birth: Gdańsk, Poland
- Height: 1.93 m (6 ft 4 in)
- Position: Goalkeeper

Team information
- Current team: Moto-Jelcz Oława (goalkeeping coach)

Youth career
- 1991–1993: Lechia Gdańsk
- 1993–1994: Hutnik Warsaw
- 1994–1995: Polonia Warsaw

Senior career*
Years	Team	Apps	(Gls)
1995–2000	Legia Warsaw	103	(0)
2000	PAOK	14	(0)
2001	Śląsk Wrocław	8	(0)
2001–2004	Amica Wronki	76	(0)
2004–2005	Admira Wacker	35	(0)
2005–2007	Sturm Graz	57	(0)
2007–2008	Dundee United	18	(0)
2008	Preston North End	0	(0)
2008	F.C. Ashdod	10	(0)
2009	Hibernian	12	(0)
2009	Jagiellonia Białystok	3	(0)
2010–2011	Dunajská Streda	5	(0)
2011	Korona Kielce	2	(0)
2011	Warta Poznań	5	(0)
2012	Olimpia Elbląg	2	(0)
2013	Legia Warsaw (oldboys)		
2018	Weszło Warsaw	0	(0)
2022	Weszło Warsaw	1	(0)
Total		351	(0)

International career
1996–2003	Poland	13	(0)
- * Club domestic league appearances and goals

Grzegorz Szamotulski (Polish pronunciation: [ˈɡʐɛɡɔʂ ʂamɔˈtulski]; born 13 May 1976) is a Polish former professional footballer who played as a goalkeeper. He is currently the goalkeeping coach for Moto-Jelcz Oława. He has had a nomadic career, playing for 15 clubs in seven countries: Poland, Greece, Austria, Scotland, England, Slovakia and Israel.

== Career ==
Born in Gdańsk, Szamotulski started his career with Lechia Gdańsk before making over 100 appearances for Legia Warsaw. Grzegorz then went on to play for PAOK FC, Śląsk Wrocław, Amica Wronki, Admira Wacker Mödling and Sturm Graz.

Dundee United signed Szamotulski in July 2007 on a six-month contract to cover for the absence of his countryman Łukasz Załuska, who had broken a bone in his foot. He made his debut in a friendly against Barcelona on 26 July 2007. He was nicknamed "The Monk" by Dundee United fans due to his resemblance to the character from the film Mean Machine. Craig Levein admitted that Szamotulski would be leaving the club at the end of his six-month contract, as he had rejected a contract offered by Dundee United.

Szamotulski signed a six-month deal with Preston North End on 6 February 2008, but soon suffered a knee injury. Two months later, and without making an appearance, Szamotulski left Deepdale by "mutual consent".

Szamotulski joined Israeli side F.C. Ashdod in August 2008, but he was released on 3 December. After leaving Ashdod, Szamotulski was linked with a move to Hibernian. Initially a contract could not be agreed with Hibs, but he signed for them on 2 January 2009 until the end of the 2008–09 season.

Szamotulski made his first appearance for Hibs against Hearts as a half-time substitute for Yves Ma-Kalambay. He kept a clean sheet in his first start in a 2–0 league win against St Mirren. Later in the season he kept four successive clean sheets, the first time a Hibs goalkeeper had achieved that feat since 1991. Injury problems affected Szamotulski after this, however, and he left Hibs at the end of the season.

On 26 February 2010, FK DAC 1904 Dunajská Streda from Slovak first division signed the former Polish international, who was a free agent.

In April 2011, he signed a contract with Korona Kielce. In October 2011, he signed a contract with Warta Poznań.

== International career ==
Szamotulski represented Poland 13 times between 1996 and 2003.

=== International ===
Appearances, conceded goals and clean sheets by national team
National team	Year	Apps	Conceded Goals	Clean Sheets
Poland	1996	2	3	0
Poland	1997	6	9	2
Poland	1998	1	4	0
Poland	2003	4	4	2
Total		13	20	4

== Honours ==
Legia Warsaw

- Polish Cup: 1996–97
- Polish Super Cup: 1997

== See also ==
- 2007–08 Dundee United F.C. season
- 2008–09 Hibernian F.C. season
