= Srokowski =

Srokowski (feminine Srokowska) is a Polish surname. Notable people with the surname include:

- Mieczysław Srokowski (1873–1910), Polish writer
- Stanisław Srokowski (1872–1950), Polish geographer and politician
- Stanisław Srokowski (writer) (born 1936), Polish writer
