= Tomasz Smokowski =

Polish journalist

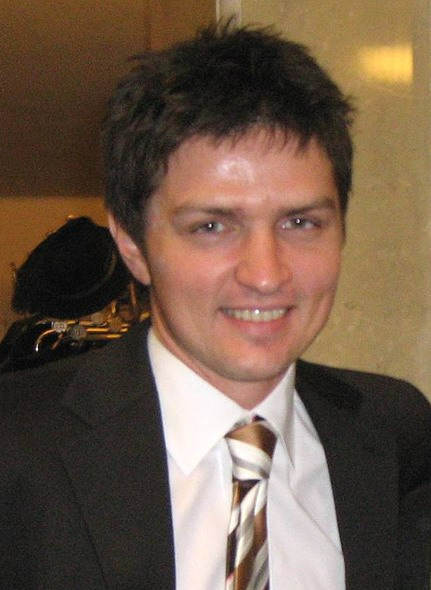
- Smokowski in 2007
- Born: Tomasz Wojciech Smokowski; May 25, 1973 (age 52); Warsaw, Poland
- Occupation: Journalist

Tomasz Wojciech Smokowski (born 25 May 1973) is a Polish journalist and sports commentator.

== Biography ==
In the years 1995–2017 he was a journalist for the Canal+ station. At that time, he was associated mainly with the duo with Andrzej Twarowski, with whom he ran the Liga+ Extra program. Winner of two Football Oscars for Best Television Commentator (2002, 2005).

In 2002, Smokowski directed the film "W kadrze – Korea 2002", about the backstage of the Polish national football team's participation in the 2002 FIFA World Cup, for which he received the second prize at the International Sports Film Festival in Milan in the reportage category. In 2011, together with Andrzej Twarowski, he was nominated for an award in the student MediaTory poll in the AkumulaTOR category. From November 2011 to June 2014, Smokowski was the director of the sports editorial office nc+. From September 2018 to January 2020, he was a commentator at Polsat Sport.

Together with Mateusz Borek, Michał Pol and Krzysztof Stanowski, he creates (from March 2020) the Kanał Sportowy on YouTube. In the years 2020–2021 he was the president of the company's management board. On 20 November 2020, the director of the Canal+ sports editorial office, Michał Kołodziejczyk announced on Twitter that Smokowski is returning to the above-mentioned station and would comment on one Ligue 1 match in each matchday. In 2021, he was also an expert commenting on some UEFA Euro 2020 matches in the studio of Telewizja Polska.

In 2021, he became the ambassador of the "Badaj jajka" campaign, which encourages regular test of the testicles to enable early cancer detection.

== Television series ==
- 2000: 13 posterunek, Polish TV series – sports commentator

== Private life ==
He is married and has two sons. In his free time, he runs marathons, trains boxing, plays tennis and paddle. In April 2019, in an interview with Onet, he admitted to his struggle with depression.
