= Weszło =

Weszło.com
- Website type: Web portal
- Owner: Weszło Group Stanowski LP
- Website: www.weszlo.fm
- Registration: optional

Weszło is a media and sports group founded in 2008 by Krzysztof Stanowski. At the beginning it was mainly involved in football, with time it expanded to other disciplines.

== History ==
From the very beginning, the texts appearing on the website weszlo.com were written with a sharp tongue, and the anonymous authors did not spare any insults and blunt comments on their goals. The founder himself, Krzysztof Stanowski, did not appear until 2011 in the text "Well to what? I think it's high time to get to know each other" (Polish: No to co? Chyba najwyższy czas się poznać), since the text disappeared from the website years later.

Initially, the main topic of the website was Polish football. Over time, the range of texts was expanded to include interviews, announcements, descriptions of matches from many European leagues, or columns of famous people related to sport. Czesław Michniewicz and Paweł Zarzeczny wrote for Weszło.

Along with the development of the portal, Weszło began to expand its family by adding new entities. In addition to the main portal, weszlo.com, there is a section dedicated to betting tips. Other ventures include the now-defunct Weszło FM internet radio, which broadcast from February 2018 to February 2022, the KTS Weszło football club, junior.weszlo.com focusing on children's football, eweszlo.pl, dedicated to electronic sports (now defunct), and kierunektokio.pl, a site exclusively covering the 2020 Summer Olympics (also no longer active). Additionally, the Weszło Travel website was launched to organize trips to matches of foreign teams.
