= Liga okręgowa =

League in sixth level of Polish football

- Country: Poland
- Confederation: UEFA
- Number of clubs: 1000+ (in 2024–25)
- Level on pyramid: 6 or 7
- Promotion to: IV liga or V liga
- Relegation to: Klasa A
- Domestic cup: Polish Cup

The liga okręgowa (in some voivodeship named klasa okręgowa, lit. 'Regional League' or 'Regional Class') is one of the tiers of the Polish football league system. The league is split into 60 groups, and is present in every voivodeship. Teams promoted from liga okręgowa move up to the IV liga, whilst relegated teams descend to the Klasa A leagues. In 12 out of 16 voivodeship, liga okręgowa stands as the sixth tier of league competition.

There are four exceptions - the Greater Poland, Lesser Poland, Masovian and Silesian voivodeships, where the V liga exists as the sixth level, whereas the liga okręgowa represents the seventh level - teams promoted from liga okręgowa move up to the V liga, whilst relegated teams descend to the Klasa A groups.

== Groups ==
=== Current groups ===
As of the 2024–25 season

Voivodeship (Polish name)	Voivodeship regional leagues	Groups
Lower Silesian dolnośląskie	Lower Silesian regional leagues	Jelenia Góra
Lower Silesian dolnośląskie	Lower Silesian regional leagues	Legnica
Lower Silesian dolnośląskie	Lower Silesian regional leagues	Wałbrzych
Lower Silesian dolnośląskie	Lower Silesian regional leagues	Wrocław
Kuyavian-Pomeranian kujawsko-pomorskie	Kuyavian-Pomeranian regional leagues	kujawsko-pomorska I
Kuyavian-Pomeranian kujawsko-pomorskie	Kuyavian-Pomeranian regional leagues	kujawsko-pomorska II
Lublin lubelskie	Lublin regional leagues	Biała Podlaska
Lublin lubelskie	Lublin regional leagues	Chełm
Lublin lubelskie	Lublin regional leagues	Lublin
Lublin lubelskie	Lublin regional leagues	Zamość
Lubusz lubuskie	Lubusz regional leagues	Gorzów Wielkopolski
Lubusz lubuskie	Lubusz regional leagues	Zielona Góra
Łódź łódzkie	Łódź regional leagues	Łódź
Łódź łódzkie	Łódź regional leagues	Piotrków Trybunalski
Łódź łódzkie	Łódź regional leagues	Sieradz
Łódź łódzkie	Łódź regional leagues	Skierniewice
Lesser Poland małopolskie	Lesser Poland regional leagues	Kraków I
Lesser Poland małopolskie	Lesser Poland regional leagues	Kraków II
Lesser Poland małopolskie	Lesser Poland regional leagues	Kraków III
Lesser Poland małopolskie	Lesser Poland regional leagues	Nowy Sącz I (Nowy Sącz-Gorlice)
Lesser Poland małopolskie	Lesser Poland regional leagues	Nowy Sącz II (Limanowa-Podhale)
Lesser Poland małopolskie	Lesser Poland regional leagues	Tarnów I
Lesser Poland małopolskie	Lesser Poland regional leagues	Tarnów II
Lesser Poland małopolskie	Lesser Poland regional leagues	Wadowice
Masovian mazowieckie	Masovian regional leagues	Ciechanów-Ostrołęka
Masovian mazowieckie	Masovian regional leagues	Płock
Masovian mazowieckie	Masovian regional leagues	Radom
Masovian mazowieckie	Masovian regional leagues	Siedlce
Masovian mazowieckie	Masovian regional leagues	Warszawa I
Masovian mazowieckie	Masovian regional leagues	Warszawa II
Opole opolskie	Opole regional leagues	opolska I
Opole opolskie	Opole regional leagues	opolska II
Subcarpathian podkarpackie	Subcarpathian regional leagues	Dębica
Subcarpathian podkarpackie	Subcarpathian regional leagues	Jarosław
Subcarpathian podkarpackie	Subcarpathian regional leagues	Krosno
Subcarpathian podkarpackie	Subcarpathian regional leagues	Rzeszów
Subcarpathian podkarpackie	Subcarpathian regional leagues	Stalowa Wola
Podlaskie podlaskie	Podlaskie regional leagues	podlaska
Pomeranian pomorskie	Pomeranian regional leagues	Gdańsk I
Pomeranian pomorskie	Pomeranian regional leagues	Gdańsk II
Pomeranian pomorskie	Pomeranian regional leagues	Słupsk
Silesian śląskie	Silesian regional leagues	śląska I (Bytom-Zabrze)
Silesian śląskie	Silesian regional leagues	śląska II (Częstochowa-Lubliniec)
Silesian śląskie	Silesian regional leagues	śląska III (Racibórz-Rybnik)
Silesian śląskie	Silesian regional leagues	śląska IV (Katowice-Sosnowiec)
Silesian śląskie	Silesian regional leagues	śląska V (Bielsko-Biała-Tychy)
Silesian śląskie	Silesian regional leagues	śląska VI (Skoczów-Żywiec)
Holy Cross świętokrzyskie	Holy Cross regional leagues	świętokrzyska
Warmian-Masurian warmińsko-mazurskie	Warmian-Masurian regional leagues	warmińsko-mazurska I
Warmian-Masurian warmińsko-mazurskie	Warmian-Masurian regional leagues	warmińsko-mazurska II
Greater Poland wielkopolskie	Greater Poland regional leagues	wielkopolska I
Greater Poland wielkopolskie	Greater Poland regional leagues	wielkopolska II
Greater Poland wielkopolskie	Greater Poland regional leagues	wielkopolska III
Greater Poland wielkopolskie	Greater Poland regional leagues	wielkopolska IV
Greater Poland wielkopolskie	Greater Poland regional leagues	wielkopolska V
Greater Poland wielkopolskie	Greater Poland regional leagues	wielkopolska VI
West Pomeranian zachodniopomorskie	West Pomeranian regional leagues	zachodniopomorska I
West Pomeranian zachodniopomorskie	West Pomeranian regional leagues	zachodniopomorska II
West Pomeranian zachodniopomorskie	West Pomeranian regional leagues	zachodniopomorska III
West Pomeranian zachodniopomorskie	West Pomeranian regional leagues	zachodniopomorska IV
