= Polish football league system =

The Polish football league system refers to the league system for association football in Poland.

== The men's system ==
As of the 2025–26 season. The Ekstraklasa lies at the top of the Polish football system, followed by I liga, II liga and III liga. From fifth tier (IV liga) downwards, the competition is held under the jurisdiction of the regional football associations.

Level	League(s) / Division(s)			
1	Ekstraklasa; 18 clubs ↓ 3 teams			
2	I liga 18 clubs ↑ 3 teams ↓ 3 teams			
3	II liga 18 clubs ↑ 3 teams ↓ 4-6 teams			
4	III liga Group I (North-East); 18 clubs ↑ 1-2 teams ↓ 3-7 teams	III liga Group II (North-West); 18 clubs ↑ 1-2 teams ↓ 3-7 teams	III liga Group III (South-West); 18 clubs ↑ 1-2 teams ↓ 3-7 teams	III liga Group IV (South-East); 18 clubs ↑ 1-2 teams ↓ 3-7 teams
5	IV liga — 16 parallel divisions 16–18 clubs (total: 282 clubs) ↑ 16 teams			
6	Liga okręgowa / V liga — 43 parallel divisions (total: 685 teams) 14–18 clubs			
7	Klasa A / Klasa okręgowa — 106 parallel divisions Up to 14 clubs			
8	Klasa B / Klasa A — 168 parallel divisions In most of the regions it is the last league level. Up to 14 clubs			
9	Klasa C / Klasa B — 59 parallel divisions Not in all regions. Number of clubs vary			
10	Klasa C — 4 parallel divisions Only in Silesian Voivodeship. Number of clubs vary			

== The women's system ==
Level	League(s) / Division(s)			
1	Ekstraliga; 12 clubs ↓ 2 teams			
2	I liga 12 clubs ↑ 2 teams ↓ 2 teams			
3	II liga (Group South); 12 clubs ↑ 1 team ↓ 2 teams		II liga (Group North); 12 clubs ↑ 1 team ↓ 2 teams	
4	III liga (Group 1); 12 clubs ↑ 1 team ↓ 1-3 teams	III liga (Group 2); 12 clubs ↑ 1 team ↓ 1-3 teams	III liga (Group 3); 11 clubs ↑ 1 team ↓ 1-3 teams	III liga (Group 4); 12 clubs ↑ 1 team ↓ 1-3 teams
5	IV liga (Regional, Voivodeship league) — 13 parallel divisions 5-12 clubs ↑ 13 teams			
6	V liga (Regional in Lesser Poland Voivodeship) — 2 parallel divisions (Group East and Group West); 6-8 clubs ↑ 2 teams			
