= Klasa B =

- Country: Poland
- Confederation: UEFA
- Number of clubs: 1000+ (in 2020–21)
- Level on pyramid: 8/9
- Promotion to: Klasa A
- Relegation to: Klasa C (Note: In some provinces. For parts, class B is the lowest tier of the game.)
- Domestic cup: Polish Cup

Klasa B represents the eighth (or ninth in some regions) level of the Polish football hierarchy. Teams promoted from Klasa B move up to Klasa A, whilst relegated teams descend to the Klasa C leagues (where the latter league exists).
