= Klasa A =

- Country: Poland
- Number of clubs: 1000+ (in 2020–21)
- Level on pyramid: 7 or 8
- Promotion to: V liga or Liga okręgowa
- Relegation to: Klasa B
- Domestic cup: Polish Cup

Klasa A is one of the tiers of the Polish football hierarchy. Teams promoted from Klasa A move up to the liga okręgowa, whilst relegated teams descend to the Klasa B leagues.

The exceptions are Klasa A in the Podlaskie Voivodeship, where it is the lowest tier of the game (no Klasa B), and in the Greater Poland, Lesser Poland, Masovian and Silesian voivodeships, where it is the eighth tier of the football hierarchy, due to the existence of V liga in those regions.

== History ==
In 1920–1927, Klasa A was the highest level of regional competitions, class A champions met in the finals of the non-league Polish Championships. In 1928, the league joined the Polish Football Association and Klasa A became the second tier of the competition – its champions were promoted as a result of multi-stage play-offs. In the 1930s, district leagues were gradually established, thus class A became the third level of the competition. It regained its importance shortly after the Second World War in 1946–1947, when the non-league Polish Championships were played again. In the following years, the successively created or liquidated leagues (second, third, fourth, fifth) resulted in the fact that Klasa A fell in the hierarchy of games in Poland.

== Groups ==
Lower Silesian Voivodeship

- grupa jeleniogórska I
- grupa jeleniogórska II
- grupa jeleniogórska III
- grupa legnicka I
- grupa legnicka II
- grupa legnicka III
- grupa wałbrzyska I
- grupa wałbrzyska II
- grupa wałbrzyska III
- grupa wałbrzyska IV
- grupa wrocławska I
- grupa wrocławska II
- grupa wrocławska III
- grupa wrocławska IV

Kuyavian-Pomeranian Voivodeship

- grupa bydgoska I
- grupa bydgoska II
- grupa toruńska
- grupa włocławska

Lublin Voivodeship

- grupa bialskopodlaska
- grupa chełmska
- grupa lubelska I
- grupa lubelska II
- grupa lubelska III
- grupa lubelska IV
- grupa zamojska I
- grupa zamojska II

Lubusz Voivodeship

- grupa gorzowska I
- grupa gorzowska II
- grupa gorzowska III
- grupa zielonogórska I
- grupa zielonogórska II
- grupa zielonogórska III
- grupa zielonogórska IV

Łódź Voivodeship

- grupa łódzka I
- grupa łódzka II
- grupa piotrkowska I
- grupa piotrkowska II
- grupa sieradzka I
- grupa sieradzka II
- grupa skierniewicka I
- grupa skierniewicka II

Lesser Poland Voivodeship

- grupa chrzanowska
- grupa krakowska I
- grupa krakowska II
- grupa krakowska III
- grupa limanowska
- grupa myślenicka
- grupa nowosądecka
- grupa nowosądecko-gorlicka
- grupa olkuska
- grupa oświęcimska
- grupa podhalańska
- grupa tarnowska I
- grupa tarnowska II
- grupa tarnowska III
- grupa tarnowska IV
- grupa wadowicka
- grupa wielicka

Masovian Voivodeship

- grupa ciechanowsko-ostrołęcka
- grupa płocka
- grupa radomska I
- grupa radomska II
- grupa siedlecka
- grupa warszawska I
- grupa warszawska II
- grupa warszawska III
- grupa warszawska IV

Opole Voivodeship

- grupa opolska I
- grupa opolska II
- grupa opolska III
- grupa opolska IV
- grupa opolska V
- grupa opolska VI

Subcarpathian Voivodeship

- grupa dębicka I
- grupa dębicka II
- grupa jarosławska
- grupa krośnieńska I
- grupa krośnieńska II
- grupa lubaczowska
- grupa przemyska
- grupa przeworska
- grupa rzeszowska I
- grupa rzeszowska II
- grupa rzeszowska III
- grupa stalowowolska I
- grupa stalowowolska II

Podlaskie Voivodeship

- grupa podlaska I
- grupa podlaska II

Pomeranian Voivodeship

- grupa gdańska I
- grupa gdańska II
- grupa gdańska III
- grupa malborska IV
- grupa słupska I
- grupa słupska II

Silesian Voivodeship

- grupa bielska
- grupa bytomska
- grupa częstochowska I
- grupa częstochowska II
- grupa katowicka
- grupa lubliniecka
- grupa raciborska
- grupa rybnicka
- grupa skoczowska
- grupa sosnowiecka
- grupa tyska
- grupa zabrzańska
- grupa żywiecka

Holy Cross Voivodeship

- grupa świętokrzyska I
- grupa świętokrzyska II

Warmian-Masurian Voivodeship

- grupa warmińsko-mazurska I
- grupa warmińsko-mazurska II
- grupa warmińsko-mazurska III
- grupa warmińsko-mazurska IV

Greater Poland Voivodeship

- grupa kaliska I
- grupa kaliska II
- grupa konińska I
- grupa konińska II
- grupa leszczyńska I
- grupa leszczyńska II
- grupa pilska I
- grupa pilska II
- grupa poznańska I
- grupa poznańska II
- grupa poznańska III

West Pomeranian Voivodeship

- grupa koszalińska I
- grupa koszalińska II
- grupa koszalińska III
- grupa koszalińska IV
- grupa szczecińska I
- grupa szczecińska II
- grupa szczecińska III
- grupa szczecińska IV
- grupa szczecińska V
- grupa szczecińska VI
