= List of newspapers in Poland =

Below is a list of newspapers published in Poland. In Poland, the distinction between the broadsheet and tabloid newspapers is mostly format, as most newspapers converted to the latter in the early 1990s.

The daily circulation of national newspapers in February 2010, published by Związek Kontroli Dystrybucji Prasy (The Board of Press Distribution Control):

== All-national daily newspapers ==
1. Fakt — 596,726
2. Gazeta Wyborcza — 437,013
3. Super Express — 312,656
4. Rzeczpospolita — 194,123
5. Dziennik Gazeta Prawna — 148,867
6. Przegląd Sportowy — 92,771
7. Puls Biznesu — 21,776
8. Parkiet — 15,176

== Regional newspapers ==
All Polish regions have their own newspapers, mostly limited to the voivodeship where they are issued. In addition, all major national newspapers issue a daily attachment related to local topics.

Regional business newspapers also started in 2004, covering Warsaw (Biznes Warszawski), Gdansk/Gdynia (Biznes Trojmiejski), Poznan (Biznes Poznanski), Wroclaw (Biznes Wroclawski), and Slask (Biznes Slaski). These biweeklies are modeled on the U.S. business journal model.

=== Greater Poland ===
1. Głos Wielkopolski
2. Biznes Poznanski

=== Kuyavia and Southern Pomerania ===
1. Gazeta Pomorska — 43.65%
2. Express Bydgoski — 15.7%
3. Nowości: Gazeta Pomorza i Kujaw — 14.5%

=== Lesser Poland ===
1. Gazeta Krakowska — 29.2%
2. Dziennik Polski — 26.8%

=== Łódź Voivodeship ===
1. Dziennik Łódzki (Łódź Daily) and Wiadomości Dnia (Today News) — 28.31%
2. Express Ilustrowany (Illustrated Express) — 26.6%
3. Łódź Post (Polish News in English)

=== Lower Silesia ===
1. Gazeta Wrocławska — 16.5%
2. Słowo Polskie — 4.7%
3. Biznes Wrocławski

=== Lublin Voivodeship ===
1. Dziennik Wschodni — 18.6%
2. Kurier Lubelski — 13.8%
3. Nowiny — 0.2%

=== Lubusz Voivodeship ===
1. Gazeta Lubuska — 59.5%

=== Masovia ===
1. Metropol — 15.5% (free of charge)
2. Metro — 13.0% (free of charge)
3. Życie Warszawy — 4.0%
4. Echo Dnia — 2.3%
5. Biznes Warszawski

=== Opole Silesia ===
1. Nowa Trybuna Opolska — 49.8%

=== Podlaskie ===
1. Gazeta Współczesna — 36.3%
2. Kurier Poranny — 20.3%

=== Pomerania ===
1. Dziennik Bałtycki — 48.6%
2. Głos Pomorza — 8.0%
3. Dzień Dobry — 3.6% (free of charge)
4. Gazeta Pomorska — 2.6%

=== Silesia ===
1. Dziennik Zachodni — 27.9%
2. Trybuna Śląska — 11.0%

=== Świętokrzyskie Voivodeship ===
1. Echo Dnia — 33.7%
2. Słowo Ludu — 10.4%

=== Subcarpathia ===
1. Nowiny — 32.6%
2. Super Nowości — 27.4%
3. Echo Dnia — 3.2%

=== Warmia and Masuria ===
1. Gazeta Olsztyńska — 47.2%
2. Gazeta Współczesna — 4.9%

=== Western Pomerania ===
1. Kurier Szczeciński — 25.5%
2. Głos Szczeciński — 19.5%
3. Głos Koszaliński and Glos Słupski — 16.5% combined
4. Głos Pomorza — 5.8%

== Polish newspapers in German ==
- Schlesisches Wochenblatt
- Polen-rundschau

== International newspapers ==
- The Warsaw Voice (in English language, approximately 12,500)
- Krakow Post (in English language, approximately 50,000)
- Łódź Post (in English language, online publication)
- Poland Daily 24 (in English language, online publication)

== See also ==
- List of magazines in Poland
