= Tomasz Teluk =

Tomasz Teluk (born 1974 in Piekary Śląskie) – Polish economic analyst, doctor of philosophy, writer and publicist.

== Biography ==
He graduated from the University of Warsaw and the Jagiellonian University. He founded the Institute of Globalization. He was an expert at Centre for the New Europe and Adam Smith Centre.

Commentator and columnist, he published his texts, among others in Wprost, Rzeczpospolita, Newsweek, Dziennik Gazeta Prawna, Civitas, Przegląd Polityczny, Nowe Państwo, Parkiet, Ozon and many others. He sametimes comments on TVP, TVN CNBC, TV Biznes, Polsat News.

For the publication of the book Greenhouse Mythology, he received the 2009 Templeton Freedom Award in the field of Ethics and Value, awarded by the ATLAS Economic Foundation in Washington, and funded by the Templeton Foundation. The award was given for "calling a national debate questioning the research related to global warming ".

As the publisher, he made available to the Polish reader a number of unique items on the publishing market, including the Nazarene by Eugenio Zolli, the Cathedral of JK Huysmans, as well as the positions of Charles de Foucauld, Martin Buber and Pope Francis.

From April 2017, he is a journalist of the Gość Niedzielny.
