= Polpharma =

Polish pharmaceutical company

Zakłady Farmaceutyczne Polpharma S.A.

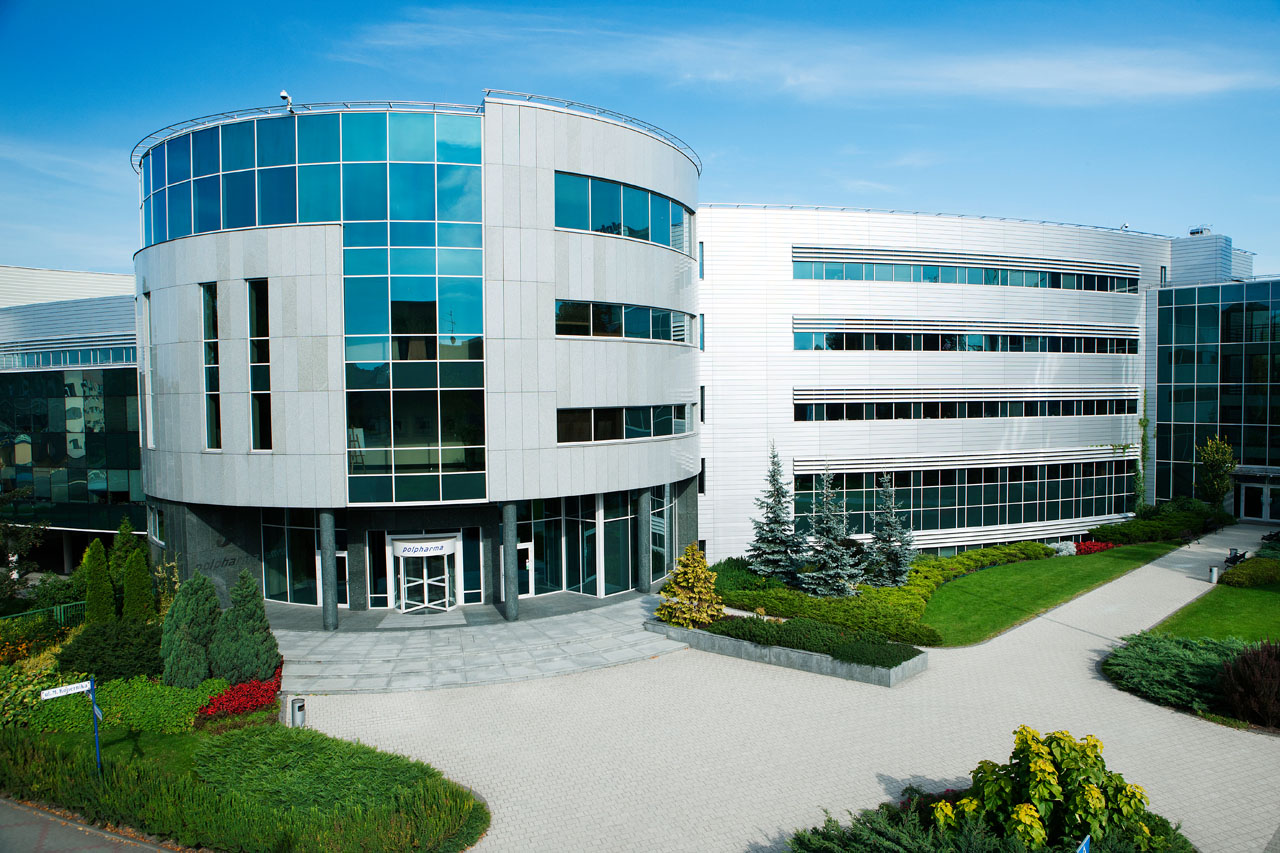
- Polpharma headquarters and manufacturing site in Starogard Gdański
- Type: Joint-stock company (spółka akcyjna)
- Industry: Pharmaceuticals
- Founded: 1935; 91 years ago (privatised 2000)
- Founder: Kurt Boskamp
- Headquarters: Starogard Gdański, Poland
- Key people: Sebastian Szymanek (CEO); Jerzy Starak (owner, co-chairman of the supervisory board)
- Products: Generic drugs, over-the-counter medicines, active pharmaceutical ingredients
- Revenue: PLN 4,926.2 million (2025)
- Operating income: PLN 1,232.5 million (2025)
- Net income: PLN 946.0 million (2025)
- Total assets: PLN 6,422.5 million (2025)
- Total equity: PLN 3,081.0 million (2025)
- Owner: Jerzy Starak (via Polpharma Group Holding B.V.)
- Number of employees: 4,345 (Poland)
- Website: polpharma.pl

Zakłady Farmaceutyczne Polpharma S.A. ("Pharmaceutical Works Polpharma"), commonly known as Polpharma, is a Polish pharmaceutical company headquartered in Starogard Gdański. It is the largest Polish manufacturer of medicines and active pharmaceutical ingredients (APIs) and the leader of the Polish pharmaceutical market in terms of both volume and value of sales. The company is the parent entity of the Polpharma Group, which operates in Western Europe (including through Farmaprojects in Spain and 089 Pharm in Germany), Central and Eastern Europe and Central Asia, with the group's management headquartered in Warsaw. The group manufactures around 400 million packs of medicines annually, sold in more than 40 countries. In 2025 the company generated sales revenue of PLN 4.93 billion and a net profit of PLN 946 million. The group is owned by Jerzy Starak. Since 1 January 2026 the president (CEO) of the Polpharma Group has been Sebastian Szymanek, who has also served as president of the management board of Zakłady Farmaceutyczne Polpharma S.A. since 2021.

== History ==
=== Beginnings (1935–1939) ===
The company was founded in 1935 in Starogard Gdański by Kurt Boskamp, a resident of the Free City of Danzig, under the name Polska Fabryka Chemiczno-Farmaceutyczna "Polpharma" (Polish Chemical and Pharmaceutical Factory "Polpharma"). The plant was established on the site of a former agricultural machinery factory. Initially the company employed a team of 20 people, producing painkillers, antipyretics and disinfectants. Its flagship product was aspirin manufactured under licence from Bayer, initially available only on prescription. The company also began producing nitroglycerin capsules.

=== Second World War and reconstruction (1939–1959) ===
During the Second World War and the German occupation of Poland the plant operated as a branch of Bayer. In March 1945 the factory was largely destroyed. After the war the plant was nationalised and placed under the management of two chemists, Zygmunt Gmaj and Jerzy Sumczyński. Reconstruction lasted from 1945 to 1949. In 1951 the company was renamed Starogardzkie Zakłady Farmaceutyczne (Starogard Pharmaceutical Works). It began producing sulfathiazole, followed by further types of medicines. From the 1950s the company mass-produced Polopiryna, a Polish equivalent of aspirin, and within the consolidated state pharmaceutical industry it was the largest aspirin manufacturer in the Polish People's Republic. In 1959 the plant was incorporated into the "Polfa" Pharmaceutical Industry Union.

=== Polish People's Republic era (1959–1989) ===
In the 1960s the production of active substances developed rapidly, followed by finished dosage forms – tablets and ampoule medicines. The company's research laboratory was also expanded. In 1967 Polpharma developed the production of metronidazole, an antibacterial and antiprotozoal drug. In the 1970s the company modernised its production infrastructure. The plant reached its peak production capacity in this period – in 1980 it employed more than 3,000 people and produced a record 2.7 billion tablets, half of which were exported to 60 countries on all continents. In the 1980s the analgesic Etopiryna also became one of its popular products.

=== Transformation and privatisation (1989–2000) ===
On 1 December 1995 the company's historical name "Polpharma" was restored and the enterprise was transformed into Polpharma SA, a sole-shareholder company of the Polish State Treasury. In 1998 construction began on a new solid dosage forms facility, built by an international team, which became one of the most modern pharmaceutical factories in Europe. The company was privatised on 20 July 2000, when a 52.5% stake was sold for more than PLN 231 million to domestic investors: Spectra Management (42.5% of shares), controlled by Jerzy Starak, and Prokom Investments (10% of shares). The consortium initially also included the insurer TUiR Warta (linked to Jan Kulczyk) and Polsat (owned by Zygmunt Solorz), but both investors withdrew before the transaction was finalised. At the same time the company's capital was increased by PLN 100 million, earmarked for investment. At the time of privatisation the company generated close to half a billion złoty in annual revenue with more than PLN 60 million in profit, giving it one of the highest profitability ratios in the industry.

=== Growth and expansion (2000–2019) ===
In 2000 Polpharma opened its first foreign representative office, in Lithuania. In 2001 the company established Polpharma Biuro Handlowe Sp. z o.o., a Warsaw-based trading company responsible for product promotion and medicine sales. Representative offices were also opened in Moscow (covering Russia and other former Soviet states) and in Ukraine. In the same year the company founded the Polpharma Scientific Foundation, which finances research projects in pharmacy and medicine.

In 2002 the Polscreen National Coronary Heart Disease Prevention Programme was launched – the largest population study of its kind in the world, designed by the prevention committee of the Polish Cardiac Society and carried out with a Polpharma grant between 2002 and 2005. In 2004 the company opened a modern research and development centre and quality control laboratory compliant with Good Laboratory Practice (GLP) – one of the largest facilities of its kind in Central and Eastern Europe – as well as a logistics centre compliant with Good Distribution Practice (GDP). In 2005 a new ampoule production building with an annual capacity of up to 50 million glass ampoules and a training and administration centre were opened in Starogard Gdański.

In 2005 Medana Pharma S.A. of Sieradz, a company specialising in paediatric medicines and vitamin preparations, joined the Polpharma Group. In 2007 Polpharma obtained ISO 14001 certification for environmental management and OHSAS 18001 certification for occupational health and safety, and opened representative offices in Belarus and Kazakhstan. In 2009 Chimpharm (Santo), the largest medicine manufacturer in Kazakhstan, joined the group, and representative offices were opened in Azerbaijan and Uzbekistan. In the same year Polpharma successfully passed an inspection by the US Food and Drug Administration (FDA), which opened the US market to the company's pharmaceutical substances. In 2010 Polpharma acquired an antibiotics portfolio and a production site in Duchnice near Warsaw from Bioton.

In April 2012 Polpharma acquired a majority stake (85.14%) in Warszawskie Zakłady Farmaceutyczne Polfa S.A. (Polfa Warszawa) for PLN 957 million, completing that company's privatisation. It also opened its first biotechnology laboratories in the Gdańsk Science and Technology Park, and new representative offices in Bulgaria and the Czech Republic. In 2013 a representative office was opened in Vietnam, and Sanfarm of Nowa Dęba, operating in the Tarnobrzeg Special Economic Zone, was incorporated into Zakłady Farmaceutyczne Polpharma S.A. as a production branch.

In 2014 Polpharma published its first corporate social responsibility report prepared in accordance with the Global Reporting Initiative guidelines. In 2015 construction began on a new biological medicines plant for external clients in Duchnice, and the company celebrated its 80th anniversary. In 2018 Polpharma took first place in the 12th Responsible Companies Ranking – the first time in the ranking's history that a Polish company topped the list. In 2019, by decision of the supervisory board, Polpharma Biologics was spun off from ZF Polpharma as an independent legal entity.

=== Consolidation and a new era of the group (since 2020) ===
In 2020 the company completed the transfer of glass-ampoule production from Polfa Warszawa to the Starogard Gdański plant, doubling capacity to 80 million ampoules per year. In the same year Polpharma co-developed the first Polish genetic test for SARS-CoV-2 (MediPAN-2G+ FAST COVID), created in cooperation with scientists of the Polish Academy of Sciences. Polpharma was also the first company in Poland to complete verification confirming the compliance of its procurement system with the ISO 20400 sustainable procurement standard. A new production facility was opened in Sieradz, comprising a non-sterile liquids plant, a warehouse and a modern R&D laboratory for inhaled medicines.

On 1 April 2021 Polpharma Biuro Handlowe Sp. z o.o. and Medana Pharma S.A. were merged into Zakłady Farmaceutyczne Polpharma S.A. as part of a simplification of the group's management structure.

In 2022 the second part of the Polpharma Distribution Centre in Błonie was launched – a warehouse and pharmaceutical wholesale facility with a total area of almost 20,000 m² and more than 35,000 pallet spaces. The company inaugurated a project to implement RNA technology in Poland under the banner "Limitless future of RNA therapeutics", in cooperation with the Institute of Bioorganic Chemistry of the Polish Academy of Sciences in Poznań, funded by a grant from the Medical Research Agency. Polpharma also became a partner of Pikralida, a biopharmaceutical start-up specialising in innovative small-molecule substances and modern drug delivery systems. In November 2022 Polpharma acquired 100% of the shares of Zakłady Farmaceutyczne Polfa-Lublin S.A.

On 1 March 2024 Warszawskie Zakłady Farmaceutyczne Polfa S.A. was formally merged into ZF Polpharma, ceasing to exist as a separate legal entity. Polpharma assumed all rights and obligations of the Warsaw company. The historic Polfa buildings on Karolkowa Street in Warsaw were earmarked for demolition.

In August 2024 Polpharma became the majority shareholder (98.3%) of Ziołolek Sp. z o.o. of Poznań, a producer of dermatological products, medical devices and over-the-counter medicines, including the Linomag brand. The acquisition enabled Polpharma to enter the dermatological products segment – in particular ointments and creams – which the company had not previously manufactured at its own plants.

In October 2024 a new centre was opened in Starogard Gdański – the first in Poland and one of only a few in Europe dedicated to research, development and production of highly potent active pharmaceutical ingredients (HP APIs), used among others in oncology. The investment, worth more than PLN 100 million, is intended to partially reduce the dependence of the European supply chain on imports from Asia, which accounts for around 80% of global production of these substances.

On 24 October 2025 a change of group leadership was announced: with effect from 1 January 2026, Sebastian Szymanek, until then president of ZF Polpharma, was appointed president of the entire Polpharma Group. He succeeded Markus Sieger, who had led the group for ten years and moved to the supervisory board in accordance with a previously agreed succession plan.

In 2025 Polpharma celebrated its 90th anniversary. To mark the occasion, the graphic artist Andrzej Pągowski created a series of posters illustrating nine decades of the company's history against the backdrop of Poland's history – from post-war reconstruction, through the political transformation, to the present day. The exhibition was presented during the 21st Health Market Forum.

In March 2026 the Polpharma Group opened its first office in India. The new location is intended to enable closer cooperation with key suppliers of active pharmaceutical ingredients, increase the predictability of procurement processes and strengthen quality and ESG standards in the region.

== Group structure ==
The parent entity of the Polpharma Group is Zakłady Farmaceutyczne Polpharma S.A., headquartered in Starogard Gdański. The company's majority shareholder is the Dutch holding company Polpharma Group Holding B.V., indirectly controlled by Jerzy Starak.

=== Polish subsidiaries and units ===
- Zakłady Farmaceutyczne Polpharma S.A. – the leading company, with production branches in Duchnice, Nowa Dęba and Sieradz (Medana branch) and an office in Warsaw
- Polfa-Lublin S.A. – 100% of shares since 2022
- Ziołolek Sp. z o.o. – 98.3% of shares since 2024
- Elektrociepłownia Starogard Sp. z o.o. (combined heat and power plant) – 100% of shares

=== Foreign subsidiaries ===
- JSC Chimpharm (Santo) – Kazakhstan, the country's largest medicine manufacturer
- Farmaprojects S.A.U. – Barcelona, Spain
- 089 Pharm – Germany
- Swiss Pharma International AG – Switzerland
- Polpharma UA LLC – Ukraine
- Polpharma India Private Limited – India (established in 2025)

The company also maintains foreign sales representative offices in Bulgaria, the Czech Republic, Lithuania and Latvia.

== Manufacturing plants ==
The Polpharma Group operates manufacturing plants in Poland and Kazakhstan.

=== Poland ===
- Starogard Gdański, finished dosage forms plant – one of the largest and most modern pharmaceutical factories in Europe, with an annual production capacity of 5 billion units of solid dosage forms (tablets, capsules) and 190 million units of liquid forms
- Starogard Gdański, active pharmaceutical ingredients (API) plant – Polpharma is the largest API manufacturer in Poland; in 2024 the Prometeusz centre, dedicated to the production of highly potent active pharmaceutical ingredients (HP APIs), including for oncology medicines, was opened at the site
- Sieradz (Medana branch) – a leading producer of paediatric medicines, vitamin preparations and dietary supplements
- Duchnice near Warsaw – production of antibiotics (first-, second- and third-generation cephalosporins)
- Nowa Dęba – production branch
- Poznań – production plant of the subsidiary Ziołolek Sp. z o.o. (acquired in 2024)
- Lublin – production plant of the subsidiary Polfa-Lublin S.A.

=== Abroad ===
- JSC Chimpharm / Polpharma Santo – Shymkent, Kazakhstan

== Operations ==
=== Generic drugs ===
Polpharma is the leader of the Polish pharmaceutical market in terms of both value of sales and number of medicine packs sold. One in eight packs of medicine sold in Polish pharmacies and one in three packs used in Polish hospitals come from Polpharma. The company accounts for around 60% of domestic production of reimbursed medicines and is the sole manufacturer of 42 medicinal products, including life-saving medicines with no equivalents available in Poland. The group's portfolio comprises more than 800 products used in areas including cardiology, gastroenterology, neurology, oncology and diabetology. The company has competencies unique in Poland in the production of sterile medicines, oligonucleotides and inhaled medicines.

=== Over-the-counter products ===
Polpharma's portfolio includes well-known over-the-counter brands, including Acard (cardiovascular prevention), the painkillers Polopiryna and Etopiryna, the vitamin D medicine Ibuvit D3 and – following the 2024 acquisition of Ziołolek – the Linomag dermatological range. In October 2024 the Acard brand received a Kotler Awards Poland prize in the category of brands recognised as iconic.

=== Active pharmaceutical ingredients ===
Polpharma is the largest Polish producer of active pharmaceutical ingredients and one of the few manufacturers to have retained large-scale API production in Poland. The API plant in Starogard Gdański commercially manufactures several dozen active substances, supplied to more than 60 countries, including the demanding markets of the United States, Japan and South Korea. For some of these substances the company holds a significant share of the global market – for example, its share for baclofen was estimated at 80% in 2022.

In 2024 Polpharma launched a research, development and production centre for highly potent active pharmaceutical ingredients (HP APIs) in Starogard Gdański. These substances are used among others in oncology medicines (trametinib – treatment of melanoma and non-small-cell lung cancer; vismodegib – basal-cell carcinoma), neurological medicines (ozanimod – multiple sclerosis) and treatments for rare diseases (risdiplam – spinal muscular atrophy). The investment extends the company's long-standing API manufacturing competencies and is significant for reducing the European market's dependence on Asian suppliers.

== Finances ==
In 2025 Zakłady Farmaceutyczne Polpharma S.A. recorded revenue of PLN 4,926.2 million, an operating profit of PLN 1,232.5 million and a net profit of PLN 946.0 million. Total assets amounted to PLN 6,422.5 million and equity to PLN 3,081.0 million. At group level, the most recent published figures relate to 2024, when the Polpharma Group recorded double-digit sales growth and exceeded EUR 1 billion in revenue.

== Management ==
The president of the management board of Zakłady Farmaceutyczne Polpharma S.A. is Sebastian Szymanek, who has also served as president of the Polpharma Group since 1 January 2026. He has worked in the pharmaceutical industry for nearly 30 years and at Polpharma since 2007; he previously held positions in the commercial division and became the company's general director in Poland in 2014.

The previous group president, Markus Sieger, led the company from 2016 to 2025 and remained on the supervisory board after the end of his tenure.

The supervisory board of Zakłady Farmaceutyczne Polpharma S.A. is co-chaired by Jerzy Starak, the company's owner, and – since 29 May 2025 – Nick Haggar.

== Research and development ==
Polpharma conducts research and development at centres in Starogard Gdański (parenteral forms and API R&D), Sieradz, Warsaw and Shymkent in Kazakhstan. In 2004 the Research and Development Centre and Quality Control Laboratory – one of the largest facilities of its kind in Central and Eastern Europe – opened in Starogard Gdański. In 2023 the KiloLab laboratory for the development and pilot-scale production of active substances was launched at the same site.

The company's development areas include modern inhaled medicines – their development and the pilot production of inhalation powders are carried out at the Sieradz plant, which also houses a modern analytical laboratory.

Polpharma cooperates with research institutions, including the Institute of Bioorganic Chemistry of the Polish Academy of Sciences in Poznań on the implementation of RNA technology in Poland. It also invests in the development of oligo-RNA technology, building dedicated research and production infrastructure, and took part in developing the first Polish genetic test for SARS-CoV-2.

In the area of digitalisation, the company is implementing digital twins and artificial-intelligence-based systems to optimise its production processes and supply chain.

== Polpharma Scientific Foundation ==
The Polpharma Scientific Foundation was established in 2001. It is one of the largest private institutions in Poland financing research projects in pharmacy and medicine.

By 2025 the foundation had held 24 editions of its grant competition and awarded 86 research grants, with the total value of funds allocated to its statutory purposes approaching PLN 45 million. The foundation also awards scholarships to outstanding doctoral students and has run a scholarship programme for doctoral students at medical universities since 2006.

The foundation has received a number of distinctions, including the title of Reliable Friend of the People of Science: Medicine and Pharmacy (2011), the Honorary Pearl awarded by Polish Market and the Institute of Economics of the Polish Academy of Sciences, and the title of Patron of the Pharmaceutical Self-Government awarded by the Supreme Pharmaceutical Chamber.

== Corporate social responsibility ==
In December 2016 Polpharma formally joined the United Nations Global Compact. The company has repeatedly received the Golden CSR Leaf awarded by the weekly Polityka. In 2018 it took first place in the 12th Responsible Companies Ranking organised by Dziennik Gazeta Prawna and the Responsible Business Forum.

In 2023 a photovoltaic farm producing renewable energy for production needs was launched at the Starogard Gdański site; the installation consists of 24 rows of structures covering an area of 25,000 m². As part of its employee initiatives, Polpharma runs the grassroots #DifferentTogether programme (Polish: #RóżniRazem), covering three areas: #TogetherForWomen, #TogetherForGenerations and #TogetherForParents.

The company has also run nationwide educational campaigns, including "Ciśnienie na życie" ("Pressure for life") on hypertension and "Przygotuj się na wstrząs" ("Prepare for shock") on anaphylaxis.

== Sports sponsorship ==
From 2000 to 2021 Polpharma was the title sponsor of the basketball club Polpharma Starogard Gdański, which competed in Poland's top division, the Polish Basketball League. During this period the team won, among others, a bronze medal in the Polish championship (2010), the Polish Basketball Cup (2011) and the Polish SuperCup (2011). The company also organised sporting events, including the "Polpharma Streetball Jam" street basketball tournament.

== Awards and recognition ==
Polpharma's distinctions include:

- Five-time laureate of the Ethical Company competition organised by Puls Biznesu and PwC (2018, 2020, 2021, 2022, and the Ethics Leader title for 2023)
- Three-time recipient of the Fair Play Enterprise certificate
- Health Eagle (Orzeł Zdrowia) awarded by Rzeczpospolita for promoting health security (2025)
- Kotler Awards Poland prize for the Acard brand in the category of brands recognised as iconic, announced during the European Forum for New Ideas in Sopot (2024)
- Most Innovative Company title in the 22nd edition of the Rzeczpospolita "Lista 2000" ranking, shared with the Selena Group (2023)
- Three Gold Stevie Awards in the 18th International Business Awards for the "Ekowizyta – zadbajmy o dobry klimat" campaign (2021)
- First place in the Forbes Poland's Best Employers ranking in the Pharmaceuticals and Biotechnology category (2021)
- Two Stevie Awards for the brand's visual identity, in the Reputation/Brand Management and Re-Branding/Brand Renovation categories (2018)
- Multiple Golden CSR Leaf awards from the weekly Polityka
- First place in the 12th Responsible Companies Ranking (2018)
- Trustworthy Brand title in the CSR category (Kantar / MyCompany Polska survey)
- Promoter of the Polish Economy title awarded by the Teraz Polska Foundation
