= Alvernia Planet =

Event venue in Nieporaz, Poland

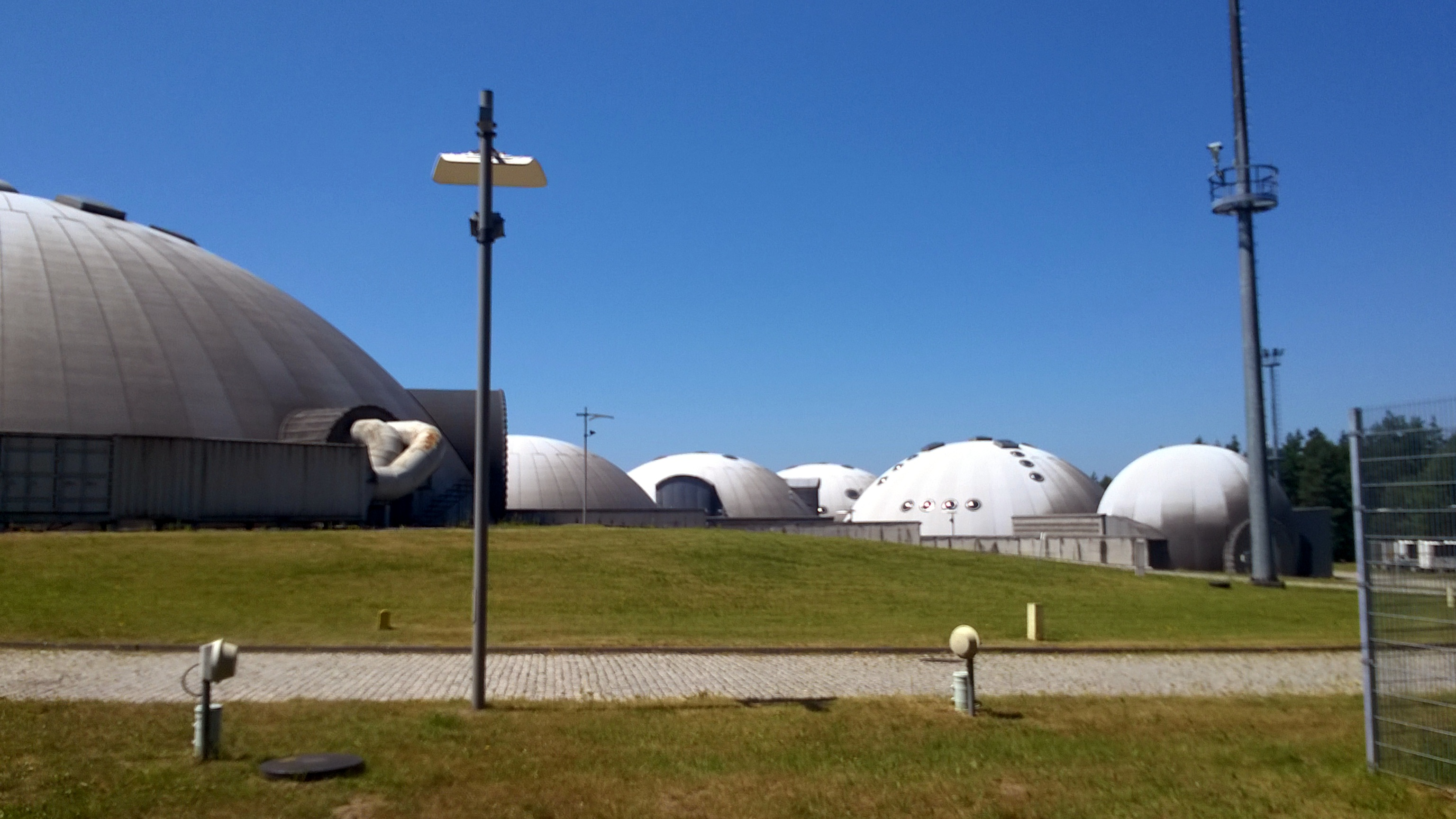
- The high-tech dome cluster of Alvernia Planet near Kraków

- Location within Poland
- Alternative names: Alvernia Studios (2002–2017)

General information
- Status: Complete / Active
- Type: Edutainment park, exhibition center, and event venue
- Architectural style: High-tech / Futuristic
- Location: Nieporaz, Lesser Poland Voivodeship, Poland
- Coordinates: 50°06′08.5″N 19°32′49.4″E
- Construction started: 2000
- Completed: 2002
- Opening: 2002
- Owner: Alvernia Planet sp. z o.o. (Gremi International)

Technical details
- Structural system: Monolithic reinforced concrete shell
- Floor area: 17,425 m^{2} (187,560 sq ft)

Design and construction
- Architect: NS MoonStudio

Website
- alverniaplanet.com/en

Alvernia Planet is a prominent edutainment park and multi-functional architectural complex located in Nieporaz, Poland, approximately 30 km (18.6 mi) west of Kraków. Originally established as one of Europe's most technologically advanced film production hubs, the facility was repurposed in 2017 following its acquisition by the Gremi International group, led by Polish entrepreneur Greg (Grzegorz) Hajdarowicz. It currently serves as a center for immersive exhibitions, high-tech education, and large-scale multimedia events.

== History and development ==
The facility was commissioned by the RMF FM radio network and constructed between 2000 and 2002. Designed to resemble a futuristic colony or space station, it operated for fifteen years as Alvernia Studios. During this period, it became a key location for international cinema, offering state-of-the-art acoustics and digital post-production capabilities.

=== Ownership transition and pivot ===
In September 2017, Stanisław Tyczyński sold the facility to the Luxembourg-based investment group Gremi International. The acquisition marked a fundamental shift in the site's operational strategy; the original business model, which relied on high-budget international film commissions, had faced increasing commercial pressure due to the facility's high maintenance costs.

Under the leadership of Greg Hajdarowicz, the complex was rebranded as Alvernia Planet. The new management pivoted from a closed-door production studio to an open-access Edutainment and event-based venue. This transition was designed to maximize the utility of the 13-dome infrastructure by hosting immersive exhibitions, corporate summits, and educational programs, thereby ensuring the long-term financial sustainability of the architectural site.

== Architecture and design ==
The complex, designed by the architectural firm NS MoonStudio, consists of thirteen interconnected metallic domes linked by pressurized, glazed corridors. It is regarded as one of the most distinctive examples of high-tech architecture in Central and Eastern Europe, noted for its futuristic, "off-world" aesthetic. The project received a nomination for the Mies van der Rohe Award for its innovative structural design.

=== Biomechanical influences ===
The interior follows a biomechanical aesthetic, drawing inspiration from the works of H. R. Giger. The design utilizes a fusion of organic-looking skeletal forms with industrial mechanical systems—a hallmark of the Cyberpunk genre.

Key design elements include:

- Industrial Brutalism: Exposed conduits and pressurized valves integrated into walls to resemble vascular systems.
- Cinematic Atmosphere: Spaces modeled after the high-tech environments of science fiction classics, such as the Alien franchise.
- Materiality: Metallic finishes and textured concrete create an immersive environment.

The facility features a life-size Xenomorph figure in the reception area as a tribute to its aesthetic roots.

=== Engineering ===
The domes were constructed using monolithic thin-shell technology. The process involved inflating pneumatic formwork before applying layers of insulation and shotcrete. This approach ensured the acoustic isolation required for a professional studio while allowing for massive, column-free interior spaces.

== Current operations ==
As an edutainment park, Alvernia Planet hosts large-scale international events, including Harry Potter™: The Exhibition (2025). The site also provides workshops in cinematography and visual effects.

== Selected filmography ==
The facility (formerly Alvernia Studios) has provided services for various international projects:

- In the Lost Lands (2025) – Directed by Paul W. S. Anderson, featuring Milla Jovovich and Dave Bautista.
- Arbitrage (2012) – Starring Richard Gere.
- Essential Killing (2010) – Directed by Jerzy Skolimowski.
