= Sieci =

Polish news magazine

- Editor-in-chief: Jacek Karnowski
- Political alignment: Right-wing
- Categories: News magazine Political magazine
- Frequency: Weekly
- Publisher: Fratria Sp. z o.o.
- Paid circulation: 38 993
- Total circulation (2019): 92 835
- Founded: November 26, 2012; 13 years ago
- Country: Poland
- Based in: Warsaw
- Language: Polish
- Website: www.wsieciprawdy.pl
- ISSN: 2299-5579

Sieci (Polish pronunciation: [ˈɕɛ.t͡ɕi], lit.: the Network), also stylised as W Sieci, wSieci, or Tygodnik Sieci; is a right-wing weekly magazine published in Poland.

== Founding and editorial policy ==
Sieci (as well as the similar competing Do Rzeczy) was founded following a conflict within Uważam Rze which led to the termination of many journalists. The first issue of Sieci was published on 26 November 2012.

Sieci's editorial policy is inline with the Law and Justice (PiS) party, and has been opposed to the competing Civic Platform party since its founding. The editorial line follows identity journalism which aims not to inform, but to integrate and mobilise supporters of a particular political option. The magazine regularly features interviews with people connected to the PiS platform and presents social issues in a dichotomous manner that is divided between PiS supporters and detractors. The magazine places an emphasis on politics, presenting political affairs in a monochromatic fashion referring frequently to economic freedom and "Catholic values".

== Controversies ==
In 2013, the magazine feature a front page with Tomasz Lis is an SS uniform with the tag line "almost like Goebbels".

The magazine was ordered by the court to publish a correction and public apology to Ewa Kopacz for falsely claiming that she pays for a personal stylist using public funds.

In 2016, the magazine ran a cover with a white women assaulted by dark males under the title "The Islamic Rape of Europe" which evoked outrage, and has been compared to WWII propaganda with the same imagery.

In July 2017, it was uncovered that the Ministry of Culture paid the magazine zl 145,500 in 2016 and 2017 for a series of interviews with the director of the World War II museum in Gdańsk, prompting allegation of corruption and cronyism.

In 2017, the editor-in-chief Karnowski accused the courts of enacting revenge on the magazine due its critical stance on the separation of powers and the Polish judiciary, calling them a "caste of judges", with the ruling forcing the magazine to change its name from wSieci as infringing on Rzeczpospolita's column trademark.

In July 2019 the city of Gdańsk issued defamation court proceedings against the magazine for numerous highly provocative and slanderous claims of Germanophilia, treason and Polonophobia including: "the leaders of Gdańsk do not cherish Polishness", "they want to join Germany", "they are actively engaging in war against Poland", they are cultivating a politicised history which rejects the heroism and pride of the Polish soldier and they are consciously referring to the traditions of the Free City of Danzig", "the city restored the sign "Postamt" on the council postal office", "they have led the area of Westerplatte to ruins", "they did not send a representative to the funeral celebrations of one of the last veterans of the Battle of Westerplatte, mjr. Ignacy Skowroń".

A front cover questioning whether the COVID-19 pandemic is real (cover title "Is this a false pandemic?") was heavily criticised in August 2020 as promoting anti-science.

In September 2020, the magazine ran a cover with Jarosław Kaczyński's homophobic statement that "LGBT ideology threatens our civilisation".

In November 2020 the city of Sopot won a libel case against the magazine for spreading fake news claiming in 2019 that "In Sopot you will not see the Polish flag anywhere. There all the flags; the flags of the city, the voivodeship, the EU, but you will not see a red and white flag."
