= Fakt =

Polish tabloid daily newspaper published in Warsaw

- Front page of a September 2006 edition
- Type: Daily newspaper
- Format: Tabloid
- Owner: Ringier Axel Springer Polska
- Editor-in-chief: Katarzyna Kozłowska
- Founded: 22 October 2003
- Political alignment: Centrism; Populism; Progressive conservatism; Pro-Europeanism
- Language: Polish
- Headquarters: Warsaw, Poland
- Circulation: 98,000 (2025)
- Website: fakt.pl

Fakt (pronounced [ˈfakt], Polish for "fact") is a Polish tabloid daily newspaper published in Warsaw, Poland, by Ringier Axel Springer Polska (a Swiss-German joint-venture subsidiary of Axel Springer SE and Ringier), and is one of the best-selling papers in Poland.

== History and profile ==
Fakt was launched in October 2003 by the Polish outlet of the German publisher Axel Springer AG, and modeled on Springer's German tabloid Bild, the biggest-selling newspaper in Europe. Like its German counterpart, Fakt is characterized by its down-market, often sensationalist journalism with a populist appeal. However, politically it is by and large centrist. The paper supported policies of the former prime minister Kazimierz Marcinkiewicz, a regular commentator. Other op-ed writers include journalist Tomasz Lis, former TVN anchorman Kamil Durczok, and former Rzeczpospolita columnist Maciej Rybiński.

In the early 2000s, Fakt had a weekly supplement contrasting to its tabloid content, Europa which featured essays by scholars and intellectuals including Niall Ferguson, Francis Fukuyama, Jürgen Habermas, and Robert Kagan.

In 2003, the circulation of Fakt was 715,000 copies making it the best-selling newspaper in Poland. Since its launch, Fakt replaced the middle-market Gazeta Wyborcza as Poland's biggest-selling newspaper, also putting pressure on the older national tabloid Super Express. In 2005, to compete directly with Fakt, Gazeta Wyborcza publisher Agora responded with a failed middle-market paper Nowy Dzień.

When Fakt was launched at a price of 1 złoty, Super Express publisher Media Express sued Axel Springer for dumping, however having lost the lawsuit, it leveled the price of Super Express to equal Fakt.

== Criticism ==
Like Bild and other tabloids, Fakt has been subjected to criticism concerning its style of journalism from media watchdogs. The Polish Journalists Association (pl:Stowarzyszenie Dziennikarzy Polskich) awarded Fakt twice with a "Hyena of the Year" award, for "a particular unscrupulousness and neglect of the principles of the journalistic work ethics."

In 2004, Fakt published a photograph showing the nude dead body of a murder victim.

In 2005, it published the photo of Stanisław Piguła, the editor-in-chief of Przegląd Koniński at the time, with the caption "This sex offender is at large." The story was about a different man, not Piguła. The Warsaw-Praga District Court ordered Grzegorz Jankowski, the editor-in-chief of Fakt, to compensate Piguła 200,000zł and to publish apologies in each day's edition of Fakt, Gazeta Wyborcza, and Konin Przeglądzie for the week following the issuing of the ruling. The court stipulated that the apology should take up at least a quarter of the front page of the newspapers. Piguła donated all of his compensation to the palliative care unit of the Konin Voivodeship Combined Hospital.

In 2015, Fakt published an photo of a dying ten year old girl that had been attacked with an axe outside a bookstore in Kamienna Góra, and sustained severe wounds to her head. The girl died of her injuries a few hours after the picture was taken.

In 2018, Fakt published an article titled "The father chose politics and the son [chose] a rope" (Polish: Ojciec wybrał politykę, a syn sznur) about the suicide of former Polish Prime Minister Leszek Miller's son, Leszek Miller Junior. The editor-in-chief of Fakt, Robert Feluś, apologized. Leszek Miller sued Fakt and Faluś for "the gross violation" of Miller and his immediate family's personal rights.

== See also ==
- List of newspapers in Poland
