= Stanisław Jerzy Rothert =

Polish sprinter and journalist

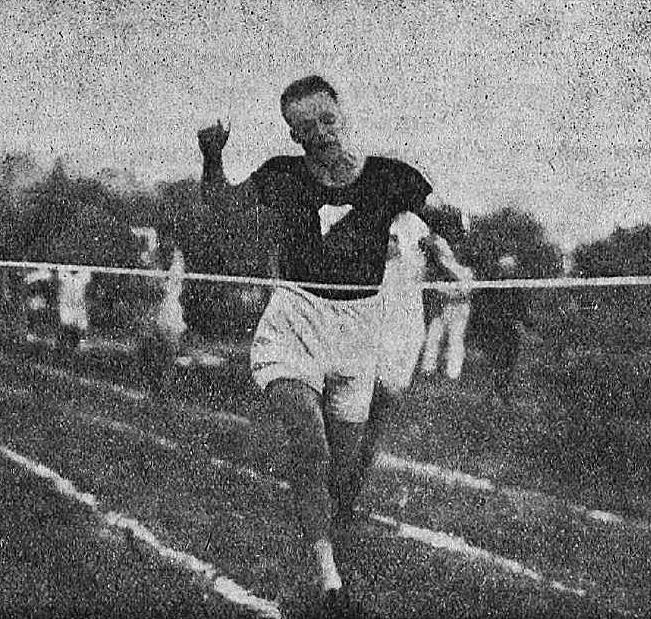
Stanisław Rothert

Stanisław Rothert (1900–1962) was a Polish journalist and athlete. Born in Warsaw on 22 September 1900, he joined the Polish Army and was wounded in the Polish-Bolshevist War. After the war he joined the Warsaw University of Technology, but did not graduate and left the school in 1926. Meanwhile, his sports career started in KS Polonia Warszawa. Between 1922 and 1927 he won seven Polish Athletic Championships. In 1923 and again in 1925 he won gold at 200 metres, 400 metres and 4 × 100 metres relay. In 1926, he won another gold in 400 metres. He was also a vice-champion a number of times, represented Poland at international events and held a number of Polish Athletic Association records.

In 1926, he joined the crew of the Przegląd Sportowy sports daily, initially as a reporter, then secretary, vice-chairman and finally as editor in chief shortly before the war. After the war, between 1946 and 1948 he worked for the Wieczór Warszawy daily and then until 1962 as deputy editor in chief of Życie Warszawy. He died on 17 August 1962 in Warsaw.
