= Parkiet =

Newspaper in Poland

- Type: Daily newspaper (Monday to Saturday)
- Owner(s): Presspublica
- Publisher: Presspublica publishing house
- Editor-in-chief: Jakub Kurasz
- Founded: 1990; 35 years ago
- Political alignment: Liberal
- Language: Polish
- Headquarters: Warsaw
- Country: Poland
- Sister newspapers: Rzeczpospolita
- Website: Parkiet

Parkiet (Polish pronunciation: [ˈpar.kjɛt], full title: Parkiet Gazeta Gieldy; Polish: Trading Floor) is a daily newspaper published in Warsaw, Poland, since 1990. The paper focuses on business and financial news.

== History and profile ==
Parkiet, based in Warsaw, was launched in 1990. The paper is published from Monday to Saturday. The publisher was Parkiet Ltd until 2005 when it was bought by its current publisher and owner Presspublica publishing house, a subsidiary of the British company Mecom. The company also publishes the daily Rzeczpospolita and the weekly magazine Uwazam Rze. In 2009 the company merged editing team of the paper with the economy editor of Rzeczpospolita. The owner of the paper, Presspublica, was bought by Polish businessman Grzegorz Hajdarowicz in October 2011.

Parkiet supports liberal economy. The paper focuses exclusively on the news and analyses related to the Warsaw stock exchange. It publishes detailed analysis of the stock market and also, quote estimates. In 2012, the paper signed a memorandum of understanding for the capital with the Warsaw stock exchange. The same year the editor-in-chief was Jakub Kurasz.

== Circulation ==
Parkiet sold 16,000 copies both in 1999 and 2000. The circulation of the paper was 13,018 copies in January–February 2001. In 2006, the paper had a circulation of 11,225 copies. The circulation of the paper was 11,243 copies in 2008 and 8,687 copies in 2009. Its circulation was 8,082 copies in 2010, and it was 7,851 copies in 2011. The paper sold 7,400 copies in 2012.

== See also ==
- List of newspapers in Poland
