= Życie Warszawy =

Polish language newspaper

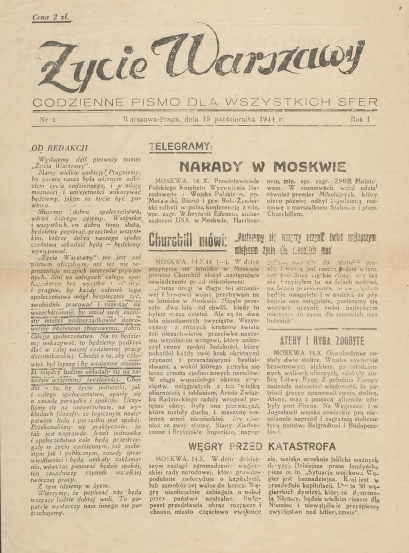
- Type: National daily newspaper
- Format: 34 × 24 cm
- Founder(s): Marian Spychalski; PPR
- Publisher: Czytelnik Publishing House (1946–1951); Prasa Workers Publishing House (1951–1991); Życie Press (1991–2000); Dom Prasowy Sp. z o.o. (2000–2007); Presspublica Sp.z o.o. (2007–present)
- Editor-in-chief: Tomasz Sobiecki
- Launched: November 15, 1944
- Ceased publication: December 17, 2011
- Political alignment: Pro-PRL establishment (1944–1991); Right-wing (1990–2011)
- Language: Polish
- Headquarters: ul. Prosta 51, 00-838 Warsaw
- City: Warsaw
- Country: Poland
- Circulation: 167 000 (as of 1946)
- Sister newspapers: Trybuna Ludu (1948–1990); Życie Częstochowy (1947–1997)
- ISSN: 0137-9437
- Website: www.zw.com.pl

Życie Warszawy (Polish pronunciation: [ˈʐɘ.t͡ɕɛ varˈʂa.vɘ], English: Life of Warsaw) was a Polish language newspaper published in Warsaw. Despite its name it was a national pro-establishment newspaper, but since 1990 it was an independent publication increasingly focused on local Varsovian issues.

== History ==
Życie Warszawy was founded in 1944 as an initiative of Polish Workers' Party and/or Marian Spychalski.

During the communist era the paper was a semi-official organ of the Polish government. In the years 1978 and 1988 the paper consisted of 12-16 pages. The number of pages was 20 in 1998.

== Circulation ==
In 2004 Życie Warszawy had a circulation of 250,000 copies in weekdays and of 460,000 copies in weekends. The paper was published by Gremi Media Group.

== Acquisition ==
As of 2004 Zbigniew Jakubiec, a Polish businessman, was the owner of the paper. It was acquired by Presspublica in August 2007 and in December 2011 the newspaper and its website was integrated into Rzeczpospolita as the local press section.

== See also ==
- List of newspapers in Poland
