= Uważam Rze =

Polish weekly news magazine

- Editor-in-chief: Jan Piński
- Categories: Newsmagazine
- Frequency: Weekly
- Founded: 2011; 14 years ago
- First issue: 7 February 2011
- Final issue: 21 November 2016
- Company: Presspublica
- Country: Poland
- Based in: Warsaw
- Language: Polish
- Website: Uważam Rze
- ISSN: 2082-8292

Uważam Rze. Inaczej pisane (Note: Lit. "I think, that. Written differently". "Rze", a misspelled form of Polish: Że ("that"), was a reference to the daily newspaper Rzeczpospolita, whose journalists launched the magazine.) was a Polish conservative weekly news magazine.

== History ==
The weekly was launched on 7 February 2011 under the editorship of Paweł Lisicki. It was owned by Presspublica, which was bought by Polish businessman Grzegorz Hajdarowicz, months later. Within a couple of months, Uważam Rze became the third most popular Polish weekly, behind Gość Niedzielny and Polityka.

In April 2012, a monthly historical journal was launched — Uważam Rze Historia. In late November 2012, Hajdarowicz fired Lisicki, spurring a mass-resignation including Waldemar Łysiak, Marek Magierowski, Robert Mazurek, Bronisław Wildstein, and others; Jan Piński became the new editor. The last print-release was on 21 November 2016; it continued to be published on the web for a while.

== Reception ==
Joanna Michlic notes that Uważam Rze Historia served as one of the many venues where "right-wing ethno-nationalistic historians" promulgated an ahistorical view of Polish history esp. concerning Polish culpability in the Holocaust.

== See also ==
- List of magazines in Poland
