= Sebastian Szymanek =

Polish business executive (born 1970)

- Born: 1970 (age 55–56)
- Education: University of Wrocław
- Occupation: Business executive
- Employer: Polpharma
- Title: Chief executive officer of the Polpharma Group
- Term: 1 January 2026 – present
- Predecessor: Markus Sieger

Sebastian Szymanek (born 1970) is a Polish business executive. Since 1 January 2026 he has been chief executive officer of the Polpharma Group, a pharmaceutical company operating in Central and Eastern Europe and Central Asia.

== Early life and education ==
Szymanek studied pharmacy at the University of Wrocław. He subsequently completed postgraduate business programmes at the School of Management and Finance in Wrocław, Oxford Business School and London Business School, and holds an MBA.

== Career ==
Szymanek has worked in the pharmaceutical industry since the late 1990s, holding commercial roles at manufacturers of generic drugs, including AstaMedica and Lekam, and at originator companies including Fournier and AstraZeneca. In 2012 he received a Polish National Sales Award in the sales manager of the year category.

He joined Polpharma in 2007 and held a succession of commercial positions. In 2014 he became general manager of the company's Polish business, and from 2017 to March 2021 he served as president of the management board of Polpharma Biuro Handlowe. On 1 April 2021 he was appointed vice-president of the management board of Zakłady Farmaceutyczne Polpharma S.A., becoming president of the board of that company on 1 September 2021.

In October 2025 Polpharma announced that Szymanek would take over as chief executive officer of the Polpharma Group from 1 January 2026. He succeeded Markus Sieger, who moved to the group's supervisory board after ten years as chief executive under a planned succession.

In May 2026 Szymanek took part in the opening of the Polish RNA Technology Platform at Polpharma's plant in Starogard Gdański, reported as the first facility in Poland for the development and manufacture of RNA-based medicines. The investment was valued at approximately 239 million złoty, of which 86.7 million złoty came from public funding provided by the Medical Research Agency and the National Centre for Research and Development.

== Public commentary ==
Szymanek has been a frequent commentator in Polish debate on pharmaceutical policy and security of drug supply. He spoke at successive editions of the Health Market Forum (Forum Rynku Zdrowia) in Warsaw, including the opening session of its 18th edition in 2022 and the "health Hyde Park" segment of its 19th edition in 2023, and has appeared on panels at the European Economic Congress in Katowice in 2024, 2025 and 2026, the last of these including sessions on the future of the health system and on Europe's economic strength.

He has argued that European and Polish drug manufacturing is dependent on active pharmaceutical ingredients sourced from Asia, and has called for policy support for pharmaceutical production in Poland and the European Union. He has also described domestic generic drug manufacturing as a significant part of the Polish economy that contributes to both supply security and innovation, and has presented the adoption of RNA-based therapies in Poland as a component of the sector's technological competitiveness. In February 2024, during a visit to the Starogard Gdański plant by the Polish public television programme Miodowa 15, he publicly urged the then deputy health minister Maciej Miłkowski to adopt systemic measures on domestic drug supply security.
