= Nowy Dzień =

- Type: Daily newspaper
- Format: Compact (Tabloid)
- Owner: Agora S.A.
- Editor: Jerzy B. Wójcik
- Founded: 2005
- Ceased publication: 2006
- Political alignment: Centrist
- Headquarters: Warsaw
- Website: www.nowydzien.pl (redirects to www.wyborcza.pl)

Nowy Dzień (Polish pronunciation: [ˈnɔ.vɘ ˈd͡ʑɛɲ]; English: New Day) was a short-lived Polish middle-market daily newspaper, which appeared from 14 November 2005 until 23 February 2006.

== Overview ==
Nowy Dzień was launched by the publishing company Agora SA, after its flagship publication Gazeta Wyborcza had come under increasing pressure from Fakt, a low-cost tabloid introduced by Axel Springer Polska in 2003.

Nowy Dzień was conceived as a "quality tabloid" with entertaining, but at the same time more serious journalism than that of typical tabloids such as Fakt's German "parent" product, Bild-Zeitung. The paper's editorial staff consisted mainly of detached Gazeta Wyborcza employees.

== Circulation ==
The publisher envisaged an average circulation of 250,000 copies, but it remained continuously below that and had a downward trend. By early 2006, circulation had dropped from an initial level of 212,000 to about 130,000 copies. As a result, Agora S.A. decided to discontinue the paper. Since then, Gazeta Wyborcza has had to continue its increasingly difficult effort to appeal to both upmarket and middle-market readerships.
