= Waldemar Łysiak =

Polish writer, art historian and journalist (born 1944)

Waldemar Łysiak (born 8 March 1944 in Warsaw) is a bestselling Polish writer, art historian and journalist, who has written under his own name as well as the pseudonyms 'Valdemar Baldhead' (a rough translation of his name), 'Archibald', 'Mark W. Kingden', 'Rezerwowy Ł.'. He is notable as an author of numerous books on the Napoleonic era, both historical and fiction. He also owns a large number of rare prints and manuscripts, among others the poems by Norwid and the only surviving copy of Kochanowski's Treny.

He is well known for his traditional and deeply anti-communist views, and is the father of Tomasz Łysiak, who is a well-known radio journalist, actor and a fantasy writer.

Łysiak wrote for Uważam Rze from 2011 to its 2016 closure and currently contributes to Do Rzeczy (since January 2013).

== Education ==
Łysiak attended the Bolesław Prus High School in Warsaw, and went on to study architecture at the Warsaw Technical University, graduating in 1968. He later studied History of Art at the University of Rome as well as the international Centre of Conservation Study in Rome. In 1977 he gained a Doctorate from the Warsaw Technical University. His thesis was titled 'Napoleon's Doctrine of Fortification'. He lectured on culture and civilization at the Department of Architecture, Warsaw Technical University.

== Controversy ==
Łysiak's works are often controversial politically. He began this theme with the trilogy Dobry (Good), Konkwista (Conquest) and Najlepszy (The Best), which alluded to events surrounding the end of the PRL (People's Republic of Poland) and the beginning of III RP (Third Republic of Poland), and took this further with the Rzeczpospolita kłamców (Republic of Liars) and Alfabet Szulerow (An A-Z of Conmen). In all of these books Łysiak attacks people he claims are the founders of the Third Polish Republic (see Round Table Agreement). Łysiak calls these people the pink saloon (różowy salon), with Adam Michnik regarded as the leader of these liberal intellectuals.

In 2006 Wojciech Czuchnowski published an article in the Gazeta Wyborcza entitled 'Waldemar Łysiak, Baron Münchhausen of the 4th RP'. Czuchnowski accused Łysiak of re-styling himself as an outspoken critic of the PRL, whereas at the time he was allegedly 'looked after' by the authorities, as his books enjoyed large publishing runs, and he was frequently interviewed by newspapers. Łysiak responded with an article in the Gazeta Polska entitled 'The Salon Retaliation, or 'hand, foot, brain on the wall'.

== Bibliography ==
- Kolebka (Poznań 1974, 1983, 1987, 1988)
- Wyspy zaczarowane (Warszawa 1974, 1978, Kraków 1986, Chicago-Warszawa 1997)
- Szuańska ballada (Warszawa 1976, 1980, Kraków 1991)
- Francuska ścieżka (Warszawa 1976, 1980, Kraków 1984, Exlibris 2000)
- Empirowy pasjans (Warszawa 1977, 1984, Poznań 1990)
- Cesarski poker (Warszawa 1978, Kraków 1991)
- Perfidia (Warszawa 1980, Kraków 1991)
- Asfaltowy saloon (Warszawa 1980, 1986)
- Szachista (Warszawa 1980, Kraków 1982, 1989)
- Flet z mandragory (Warszawa 1981, 1996, Kraków 1982)
- Frank Lloyd Wright (Warszawa 1982, Chicago-Warszawa 1999)
- MW (Kraków 1984, 1988)
- Łysiak Fiction (Warszawa 1986)
- Wyspy bezludne (Kraków 1987, Warszawa 1994)
- Łysiak na łamach (Warszawa 1988)
- Konkwista (Warszawa 1988, 1989, Chicago-Warszawa 1997)
- Dobry (Warszawa 1990, Chicago-Warszawa 1997)
- Napoleoniada (Warszawa 1990, Chicago-Warszawa 1998)
- Lepszy (Warszawa 1990)
- Milczące psy (Kraków 1990, Chicago-Warszawa 1997)
- Najlepszy (Warszawa 1992, Chicago-Warszawa 1997)
- Łysiak na łamach 2 (Warszawa 1993)
- Statek (Warszawa 1994, Chicago-Warszawa 1999)
- Łysiak na łamach 3 (Warszawa 1995)
- Wilk i kuglarz - Łysiak na łamach 4 (Warszawa 1995)
- Old-Fashion Man - Łysiak na łamach 5 (Chicago-Warszawa 1997)
- Malarstwo Białego Człowieka - tom 1 (Poznań 1997)
- Malarstwo Białego Człowieka - tom 2 (Chicago-Warszawa 1997)
- Malarstwo Białego Człowieka - tom 3 (Chicago-Warszawa 1998)
- Malarstwo Białego Człowieka - tom 4 (Chicago-Warszawa 1998)
- Poczet Królów bałwochwalców (Chicago-Warszawa 1998)
- Malarstwo Białego Człowieka - tom 5 (Chicago-Warszawa 1999)
- Napoleon fortyfikator (Chicago-Warszawa 1999)
- Malarstwo Białego Człowieka - tom 6 (Chicago-Warszawa 1999)
- Cena (Chicago-Warszawa 2000) ISBN 83-87071-64-1
- Malarstwo Białego Człowieka - tom 7 (Chicago-Warszawa 2000)
- Stulecie kłamców (Chicago-Warszawa 2000)
- Malarstwo Białego Człowieka - tom 8 (Chicago-Warszawa 2000)
- Wyspa zaginionych skarbów 2001
- Łysiak na łamach 6. Piórem i mieczem 2001
- Kielich (2002)
- Empireum (2003)
- Rzeczpospolita kłamców - Salon (2004) ISBN 83-917612-5-8
- Ostatnia kohorta (2005)
- Najgorszy (2006)
- Alfabet szulerów część pierwsza A-L. Salon 2. (2006) ISBN 83-60297-11-8
- Alfabet szulerów część druga M-Z. Salon 2. (2006) ISBN 83-60297-12-6
- Talleyrand - Droga "Mefistofelesa". Warszawa (2007) ISBN 978-83-60297-18-6
- Lider (2008) ISBN 978-83-60297-21-6
- Historia Saskiej Kępy (2008) ISBN 978-83-60297-26-1
- Mitologia świata bez klamek (2008) ISBN 978-83-60297-27-8
