= Dziennik Zachodni =

Newspaper in Poland

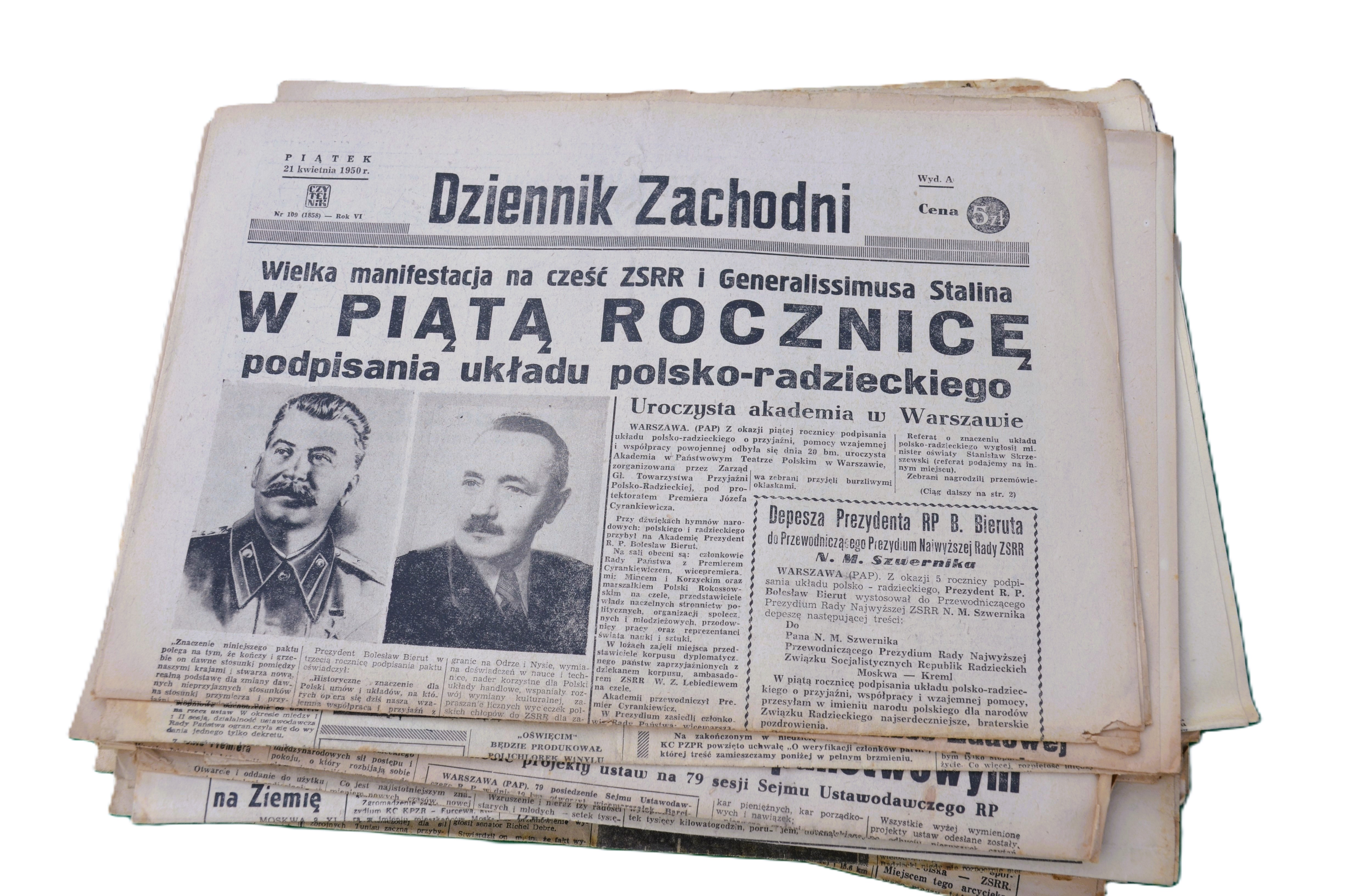
- Type: Daily newspaper
- Format: Compact
- Owner: Polskapresse
- Publisher: Polskapresse
- Editor: Marek Twaróg
- Founded: 1945; 81 years ago
- Language: Polish language
- Headquarters: Sosnowiec
- Circulation: 326,000
- Website: www.dz.com.pl

Dziennik Zachodni (Polish pronunciation: [ˈd͡ʑɛn.ɲik zaˈxɔd.ɲi], DZ; transl. Western Daily) is a regional Polish newspaper distributed in Upper Silesia. Its headquarters is located in the city of Sosnowiec.

== History ==
Established in February 1945 by Stanisław Ziemba, it was initially a state-held daily. Taken over by Polskapresse company, itself a part of the Verlagsgruppe Passau, it is currently the best selling regional newspaper in Poland with an average of 109,000 copies sold daily. Following the 2004 merger with Trybuna Śląska daily, it is also one of the largest newspapers.

== Circulation ==
The main issue is published daily in approximately 326,000 copies, with a set of add-ins devoted to sports and labour (Mondays), education (Tuesdays), motorization (Wednesdays), household (Thursdays), health and travels (Saturdays).

== Notable contributors ==
Notable contributors include:

- Krystyna Bochenek - Polish senator and journalist
- Jan Miodek - professor, language expert of Poland-wide fame
- Stanisław Janicki - film director, critic
- Tadeusz Pieronek - bishop, theologist
- Kazimierz Kutz - film director
- Tomasz Lis - journalist and TV personality
- Gwidon Miklaszewski
- Tigran Vardikyan
