= Przegląd Sportowy =

Polish sports newspaper

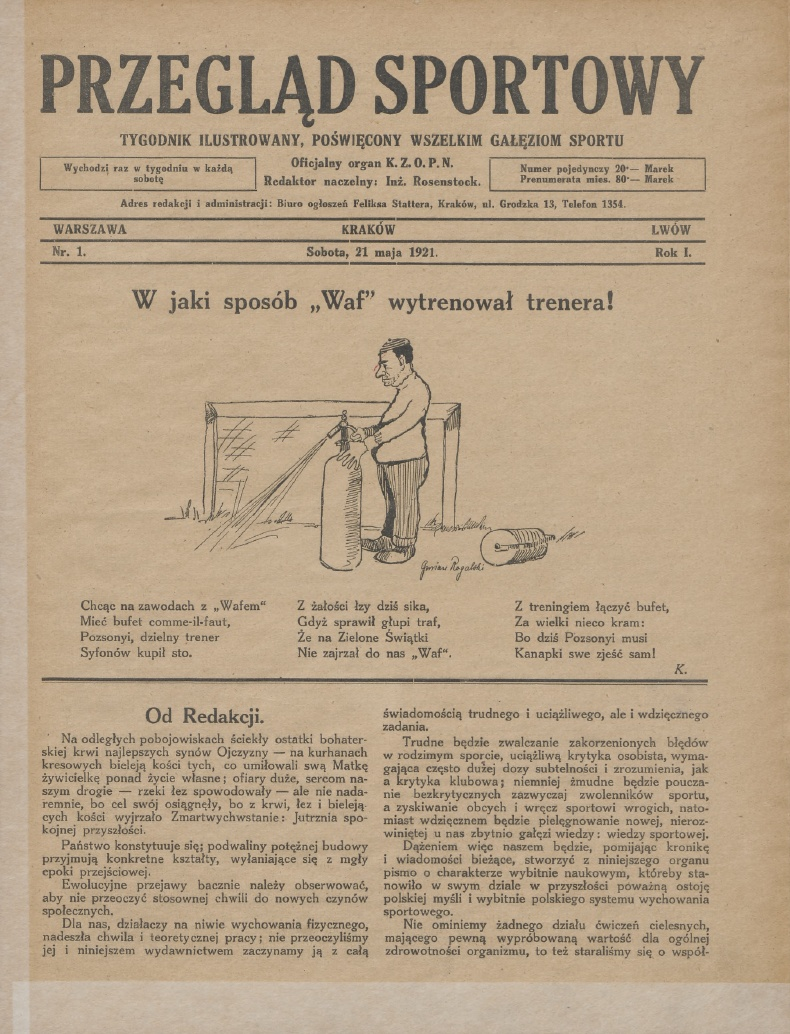
- The newspaper logo
- Type: daily sports newspaper
- Publisher: Ringier Axel Springer Polska
- Editor: Paweł Wołosik
- Founded: 21 May 1921
- Language: Polish
- Headquarters: Warsaw
- Circulation: 48,787
- Website: przegladsportowy.pl

Przegląd Sportowy (Polish pronunciation: [ˈpʂɛɡlɔnt spɔrˈtɔvɨ], Sports Review) is the oldest and now the only Polish sports daily, founded in 1921 in Kraków. In 1926 it initiated an annual, popular plebiscite for the Polish Sportspersonality of the Year. Its current editor-in-chief is Paweł Wołosik.

== History ==
The newspaper was founded in 1921 on the initiative of Kraków sports journalists Ignacy Rosenstock, J. Billig, Aleksander Dembiński, Józef Szkolnikowski, Leon Gleissner and Tadeusz Synowiec. Rosenstock was appointed the newspaper's first editor-in-chief. On 23 July 1921, it officially became affiliated with the Polish Football Association. The newspaper's headquarters moved to Warsaw in 1925.

The circulation of the newspaper is of around 50,000 copies per day (sale is about 25,000). It also has a digital presence: the website and various social accounts offer online sport news in Polish. In March 2014, they announced a cooperation with the startup Betegy, providing data-based football predictions in their printed newspaper as well as online.

The shareholder of the newspaper is Ringier Axel Springer Media AG, a joint venture between the German publishing company Axel Springer and Ringier, the largest international operating media company in Switzerland.

Notable journalists of Przegląd Sportowy have included Zygmunt Weiss, Krzysztof Stanowski, Karol Stopa, Stanisław Rothert, Tomasz Wołek and Roman Kołtoń.

== List of editors-in-chief ==
- Ignacy Rosenstock (1921)
- Ferdynand Goetel (1922–1926)
- Kazimierz Wierzyński (1926–1931)
- Marian Strzelecki (1931–1939)
- Tadeusz Maliszewski (1945–1950)
- Edward Trojanowski (1950–1951)
- Edward Strzelecki (1951–1969)
- Andrzej Jucewicz (1970–1976)
- Łukasz Jedlewski (1976–1990)
- Maciej Polkowski (1990–1994),
- Piotr Górski (1994–2003)
- Roman Kołtoń (2004–2007)
- Jacek Adamczyk (2007–2008)
- Tomasz Kontek (2008)
- Marcin Kalita (2008–2013)
- Michał Pol (2013–2017)
- Przemysław Rudzki (2017–2019)
- Paweł Wołosik (2019–)

== See also ==
- List of newspapers in Poland
