= Nieporaz =

- Village
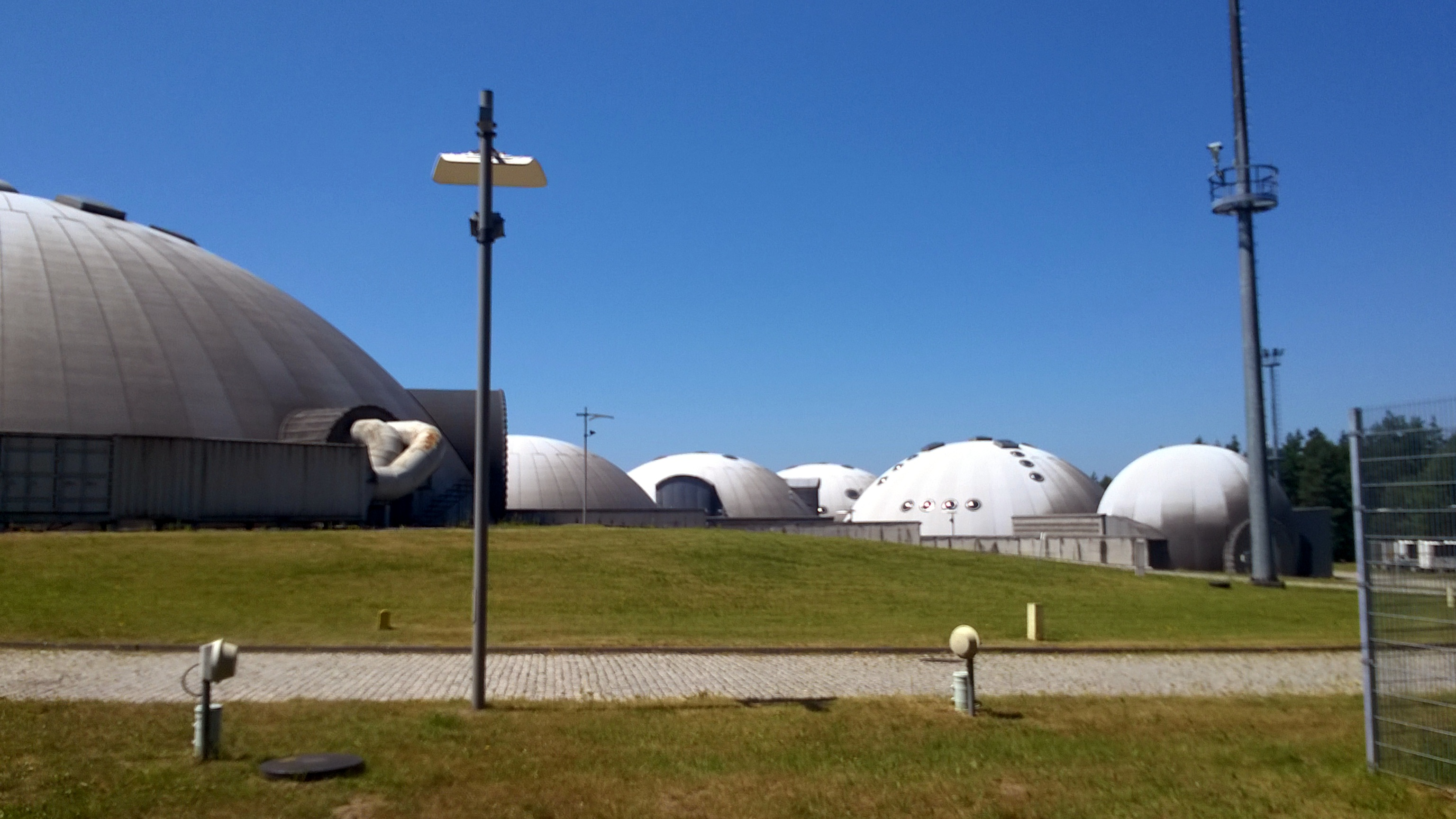
- Alvernia Studios

- Location within Poland
- Coordinates: 50°5′53″N 19°32′12″E
- Country: Poland
- Voivodeship: Lesser Poland
- County: Chrzanów
- Gmina: Alwernia
- Population: 417

Nieporaz [ɲɛˈpɔras] is a village in the administrative district of Gmina Alwernia, within Chrzanów County, Lesser Poland Voivodeship, in southern Poland.

The village is home to the Alvernia Studios.
