= Puls Biznesu =

Polish daily newspaper

- Type: Daily business newspaper
- Owner: Bonnier Business
- Founder: Dagens Industri
- Founded: 14 January 1997
- Language: Polish
- Headquarters: Warsaw
- Circulation: 10,539 (October 2016)
- Website: www.pb.pl

Puls Biznesu (lit. Business' Pulse) is a Polish-language daily newspaper devoted to business and economic issues.

== History ==
Puls Biznesu was established by Dagens Industri in 1997. It is published by Bonnier Business (Polska) company, a Polish branch of the Swedish Bonnier Group. The newspaper features daily thematic add-ons: Real estate (published on Tuesdays), business and technology (Wednesdays), transport and forwarding (Thursdays) and job and career (Fridays). The newspaper also owns a web portal intended for stock market investors.

== Awards ==
Puls Biznesu presents Gazele Biznesu awards to the Polish companies. The paper is the recipient of the 2004 Society for News Design award. The daily was awarded by the Chamber of Press Publishers GrandFront 2010 prize for its front page on 12 April 2010.

== Circulation ==
The circulation of Puls Biznesu was 23,282 copies in January–February 2001. The 2005 circulation of the daily was about 45,000 copies. It was 20,399 copies in 2006.

== See also ==
- List of newspapers in Poland
