= Alvernia Studios =

Polish film production company

Coordinates: 50.1025°N 19.546944°E

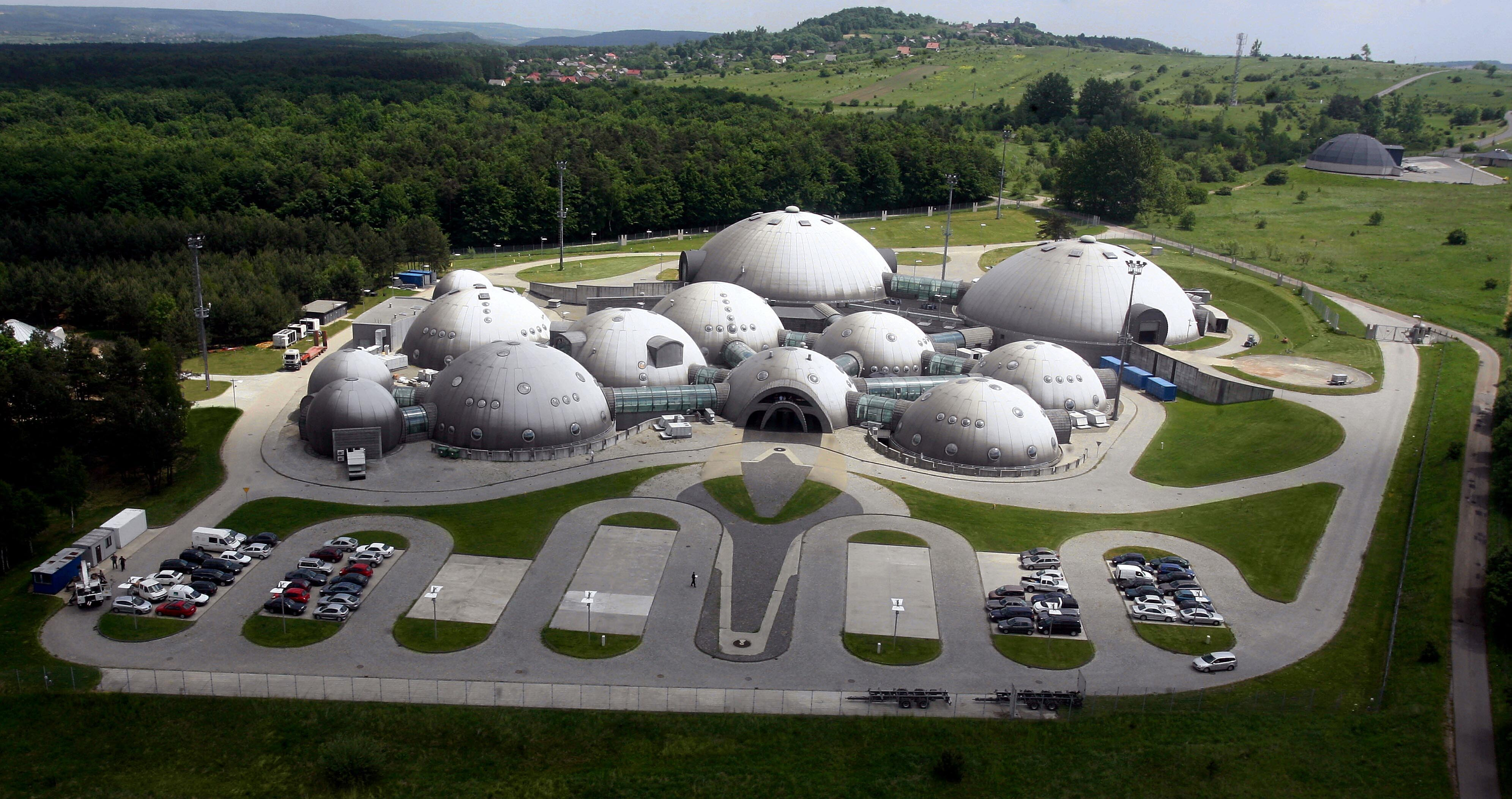
Alvernia Studios

Video showing Alvernia Studios

Alvernia Studios is a film studio located in Alwernia Municipality, Poland, 18 kilometres (11 mi) west of the Kraków Airport. The studio, with additional offices in Mumbai and Warsaw, produces international features for theatrical releases, video games, music projects, and commercials.

== History ==
The 13,000 square metres (140,000 sq ft) domed complex features multiple sound stages, the world's biggest spherical shadeless blue screen, music scoring studios, a motion capture system, 16 mm and 35 mm laboratories, a color correction studio, a visual effects department, and a final mix studio. Alvernia Studios activities included the production of feature films and commercials, as well as the implementation of music projects (including the smallest concert of the world), video games, shows and concerts.

The studio was founded in 2000 by broadcasting executive Stanisław Tyczyński, a Polish entrepreneur, the founder and former owner of RMF FM. Alvernia Studios was the first non-state film company in post-war Poland.

In 2017, the studio was bought by Grupa Gremi, controlled by the entrepreneur Grzegorz Hajdarowicz. He planned to launch an entertainment center in the buildings, but due to the COVID-19 pandemic, the Alvernia xR project was created. It offers productions using augmented reality.

On November 30, 2021, there was a fire at the plant.

== Movies ==
- Burning Bush – directed by Agnieszka Holland (Czech Republic, 2013)
- Bhaag Milkha Bhaag – directed by Rakeysh Omprakash Mehra (India, 2013)
- Arbitrage – directed by Nicholas Jarecki (USA-Poland, 2012)
- Vamps – directed by Amy Heckerling (USA-Poland, 2012)
- Crulic: The Path to Beyond – directed by Anca Damian (Romania-Poland, 2011)
- Azaan – directed by Prashant Chadha (India, 2011)
- Essential Killing – directed by Jerzy Skolimowski (Ireland-Norway-Poland-Hungary, 2010)
