= Dziennik Gazeta Prawna =

Polish daily newspaper

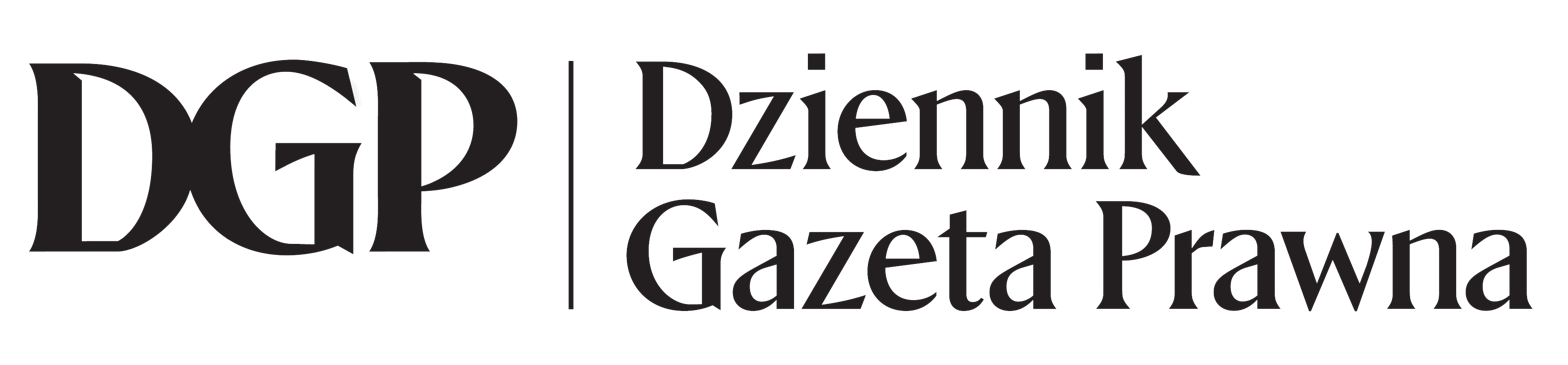
- Type: Daily newspaper (Monday to Friday)
- Owner(s): Infor Biznes
- Founder(s): Ryszard Pieńkowski
- Publisher: Infor Biznes
- Editor-in-chief: Krzysztof Jedlak
- Founded: 1 September 2009; 16 years ago
- Political alignment: Centrist; Center-right
- Language: Polish
- Headquarters: Warsaw
- Circulation: 27,353 (2023)
- ISSN: 2080-6744
- OCLC number: 762030561
- Website: www.dziennik.pl

Dziennik Gazeta Prawna (Polish: [ˈd͡ʑɛn.ɲik ɡaˈzɛ.ta ˈprav.na], Daily Legal Newspaper; abbreviation: DGP) is a Polish legal and business daily newspaper, headquartered in Warsaw and published from Monday to Friday. The paper focuses on law, taxes and finances. The publisher of DGP is Infor Biznes, a Polish publishing company.

== History ==
The paper was launched in September 2009 as a result of the merger between Dziennik Polska-Europa-Świat (issued by Ringier Axel Springer Polska) and Gazeta Prawna (Legal Newspaper in English, issued by Infor Biznes (pl) since October 1994). Of them, Dziennik was a daily while the latter was a special legal paper. The publisher of Dziennik, Ringier Axel Springer, sold it to Infor Biznes, the publisher of Gazeta Prawna. Until 2018 Ringier Axel Springer Media AG owned a 49% shares of Infor Biznes, publisher of the daily. In March 2018 Ryszard Pieńkowski, owner of Infor PL Group, bought back 49% of shares in Infor Biznes from Ringier Axel Springer. The owner and president of the management board of Infor PL and Infor Biznes is Ryszard Pieńkowski.

Michał Kobosko was the editor-in-chief of the paper from 2009 to 2010. From June 2016 the editor-in-chief is Krzysztof Jedlak.

== Content ==
The major focus of Dziennik Gazeta Prawna is economic and legal affairs. It employed three different colors for its three main sections: white for news, yellow for tax and legal affairs and salmon for business and finance news until 2010. Later salmon-colored section was integrated into main section.

Extended editorial offer of DGP features: Tax Mondays with the weekly magazine for subscribers of "Taxes and Accounting", Entrepreneurial and Legal Tuesdays with weekly magazines for subscribers of "Lawyer" and "Enterprise and Law", Self-governmental Wednesdays with the weekly magazine for subscribers of "Self-government and Administration" as well as HR Thursdays with the weekly magazine for subscribers of "Payroll and HR".

The Friday edition of DGP is published as a magazine, the news contents are replaced with topics similar to those encountered in opinion-forming weekly magazines such as social issues, business, culture and technological innovations. Since November 2015 the weekend edition is published as a whole on white pages, while the subscribers additionally receive the specialist weekly magazine entitled Tygodnik Gazeta Prawna which features news on four areas: accounting and taxes, payroll and HR, self-government and administration, enterprise and law.

DGP has a centrist and center-right stance. The paper is also a liberal conservative publication.

== Circulation ==
The circulation of Dziennik Gazeta Prawna was 118,206 copies in 2009. It was 99,582 copies in 2010 and 91,554 in 2011. In a readership study covered the period of April through September 2011 it was found that the paper had the score of 2.24%, making it the seventh most read paper in Poland. The estimated circulation for the daily in 2012 was 82,055 copies. In February 2013 the paper sold 74,150 copies. Its print and e-edition circulation was 53,058 copies in August 2014.

== See also ==
- Gazeta Krakowska
- List of newspapers in Poland
