= Gazeta Wrocławska =

Polish daily newspaper

- Type: Daily newspaper
- Owner: Polska Press
- Editor-in-chief: Maja Majewska
- Founded: 1948; 78 years ago
- Language: Polish
- Headquarters: Wrocław, Poland
- Circulation: 23,408 (2015)
- ISSN: 1898-3146
- Website: gazetawroclawska.pl

Gazeta Wrocławska (Polish pronunciation: [ɡaˈzɛ.ta vrɔˈt͡swaf.ska]) is a Polish daily newspaper based in Wrocław.

== History ==
Originally titled Gazeta Robotnicza, the newspaper, which served as an organ of the Polish United Workers' Party, was founded from the merger of Warszawskiego Kuriera Ilustrowanego and Trybuny Dolnośląskiej. Its first issue was published on 16 December 1948.

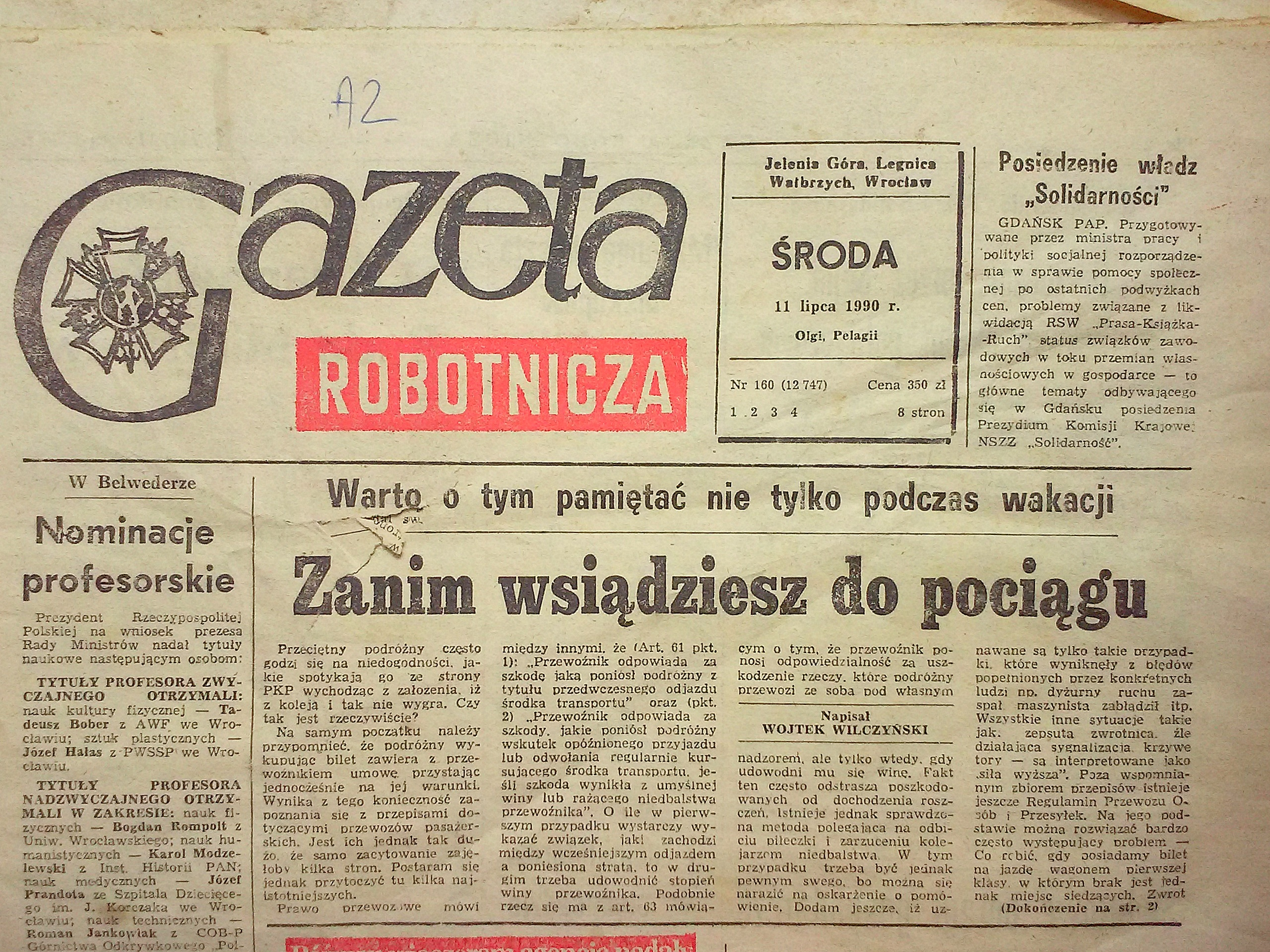
Front page of Gazeta Robotnicza, 11 July 1990

In December 1993, Interpublication AG, a Swiss shell company of Passauer Neue Presse, acquired a 50% stake in Gazeta Robotnicza. From December 1995 to June 1996, the newspaper operated under the dual title of Gazeta Robotnicza. Gazeta Wrocławska. It was later published as Robotnicza Gazeta Wrocławska until 1999, when its name was finally changed to Gazeta Wrocławska.

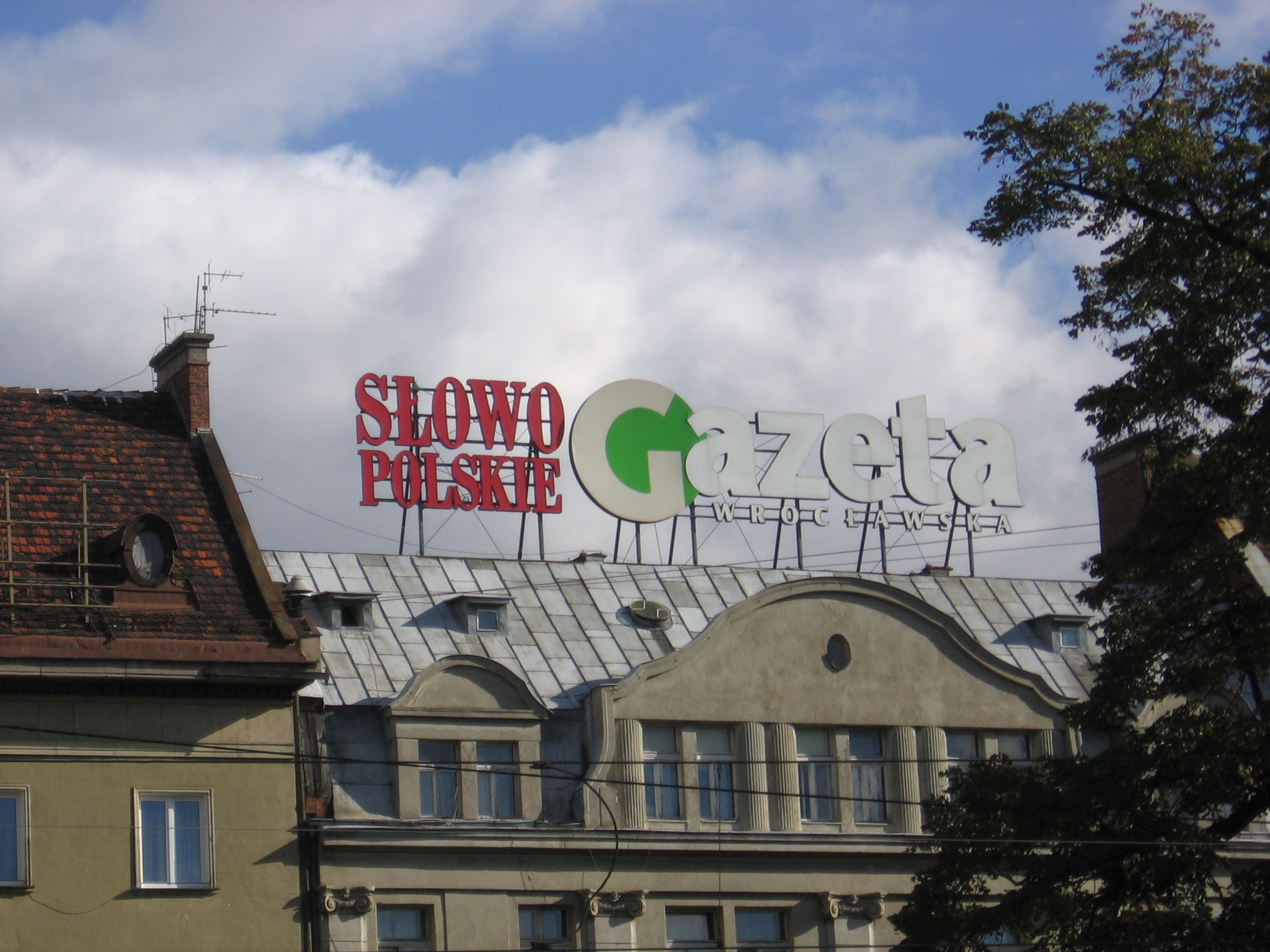
The newspaper was published as Słowo Polskie – Gazeta Wrocławska from 2003 to 2007.

In 2003, Polskapresse, a subsidiary of Passauer Neue Presse and Gazeta Wrocławska's owner, acquired Słowo Polskie and merged it into Gazeta Wrocławska; the newspaper was subsequently published as Słowo Polskie – Gazeta Wrocławska from 2004 to 2007. The name was later changed to Polska – Gazeta Wrocławska as it was published as part of Polska Metropolia Warszawska. In 2015, the newspaper's name was changed once again to Gazeta Wrocławska.

In December 2020, Orlen signed a preliminary agreement to acquire Polskapresse—whose name had since changed to Polska Press—and its newspapers. The following June, Alicja Giedroyć-Skiba was appointed editor-in-chief of Gazeta Wrocławska, replacing Arkadiusz Franas. Four months later, Giedroyć-Skiba left the newspaper and was replaced by Artur Matyszczyk. In November 2022, Matyszczyk was replaced by Janusz Życzkowski. In February 2024, Życzkowski resigned from the position.

Since its acquisition by Orlen, the newspaper has faced allegations that it promotes pro-Law and Justice (PiS) party propaganda.

== Notable personnel ==
- Zdzisław Balicki
- Julian Bartosz
- Andrzej Bułat
- Arkadiusz Franas
- Tadeusz Galiński
- Alicja Giedroyć-Skiba
- Romuald Gomerski
- Maja Majewska
- Artur Matyszczyk
- Jan Miodek
- Irena Tarłowska
- Roman Werfel
- Janusz Życzkowski
