= Grzegorz Hajdarowicz =

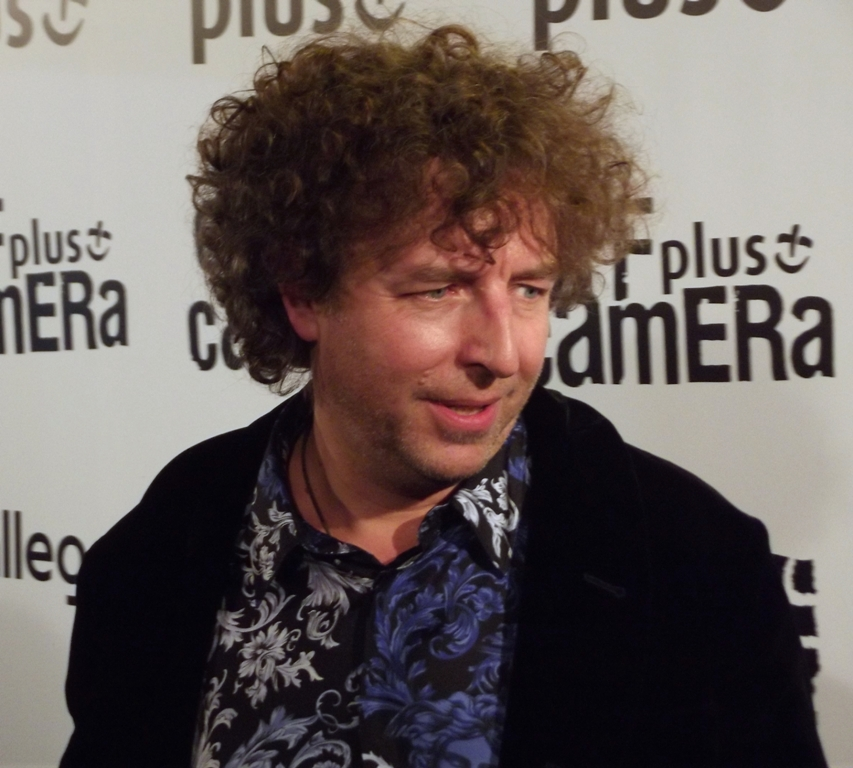
- Hajdarowicz in 2013
- Born: 1965-10-27
- Education: Jagiellonian University
- Occupation: Businessman
- Children: 3

Grzegorz Hajdarowicz (born 27 October 1965) is a Polish entrepreneur, film producer, honorary consul, and the founder of Gremi Media. Participant of the international Bilderberg meeting in 2018. Ranked 17th on the list of Business Leaders 2021 by the Polish edition of "Forbes" magazine. Since 2010, Hajdarowicz has been serving as the honorary consul of the Federative Republic of Brazil in the regions of Małopolska and Upper Silesia, promoting cultural and economic ties between Poland and Brazil.

== Education ==
Hajdarowicz graduated from the Institute of Political Science at the Faculty of Law of the Jagiellonian University in Kraków. He received a Master's Degree in Political Science. During the 1980s, Hajdarowicz was involved in underground movements opposing the communist regime in Poland. He was a member of the Confederation of Independent Poland (KPN) and participated in anti-regime protests in Kraków and Nowa Huta. He also worked in an underground printing house in Wieliczka.

== Business career ==
Hajdarowicz created his first company, Gremi, in 1991. Currently, together with its related companies, Gremi focuses on equity investments, restructuring and real estate projects. Hajdarowicz is the main shareholder of Gremi corporate group (99%) which controls, among others, the KCI S.A listed company.

In 2009 Hajdarowicz has invested in a real estate project “Arteco Estrela” in Brazil by buying Fazenda Estrela with an area of 25 square kilometres and 6.5 kilometres of beach. For this project, in 2017 Hajdarowicz signed a partnership agreement with Six Senses, a company specializing in the management of luxury hotels, resorts and spas.

In 2009, the acquisition of the weekly magazine Przekrój marked the beginning of a new phase in the development of a media project. Today, Gremi Media S.A. owns Rzeczpospolita and publishes the economic daily Parkiet, the monthly magazine "Uważam Rze Historia", as well as online editions of Sukces, Uważam Rze, and the Polish edition of Bloomberg Businessweek. In December 2021, an agreement was reached under which 40% of Gremi Media’s shares were acquired by the Dutch investment fund Pluralis B.V. Pluralis B.V.'s investors include funds financially supported by George Soros, such as the Media Development Investment Fund (MDIF) and the Soros Economic Development Fund (SEDF).

In 2017 he acquired Alvernia Studios.

For a few years, within a separate business line, Grzegorz Hajdarowicz has been involved in film production through Gremi Film. He has produced 6 feature films since 2003, 3 Polish productions: Zakochany Anioł (2005) Pod powierzchnią (2006), Hania (2007), and 3 international movies: Nightwatching (2007, dir. Peter Greenaway), Carmo, Hit the Road (2008, dir. Murilo Pasta), City Island (2009, dir. Raymond De Felitta).

== Film awards ==
City Island - Tribeca Film Festiwal's Audience Award in New York.

Carmo - 25th Sundace Film Festival selection.

== Orders ==
Order of Polonia Restituta, the Knight's Cross (2015)

Order of Rio Branco, Officer (2020)

Cross of Freedom and Solidarity (2021)
