= Ringier Axel Springer Media AG =

Swiss media company

- Type: Public limited company
- Industry: Internet, publishing, advertising
- Founded: 2010
- Headquarters: Zürich, Switzerland
- Key people: CEO Mark Dekan and Chairman of the supervisory board Jan Bayer
- Owner: Ringier AG, Axel Springer SE
- Number of employees: c. 3,100
- Website: Official website

Ringier Axel Springer Media AG is a media company based in Zürich. The company was founded on 1 July 2010 by Swiss Ringier Holding AG and German Axel Springer SE to merge the activities of the two previous companies in CEE countries. It operates in the media and advertising market

Ringier Axel Springer Media AG owns: on the Polish market – Ringier Axel Springer Polska and Gratka.pl; is a majority shareholder of MZN Property and StepStone Polska, as well as co-owner of No Fluff Jobs. In addition, in Central Europe it is the owner of Ringier Axel Springer Serbia, Ringier Axel Springer Slovakia, Ringier Axel Springer Hungary, Profession.hu, CV Keskus and Blikk.

== Media activities ==
In Poland Ringier Axel Springer is a press publisher of: Fakt, Newsweek Polska (and Newsweek Historia, Slow, Living, Psychology, Health, Smart Travelling magazines), Forbes Polska, Forbes Women, Przegląd Sportowy, Auto Świat, Komputer Świat. It is the owner of the online services: Onet.pl, NOIZZ.pl, Ofeminin.pl, Business Insider Polska, Plejada, Medonet, Game Planet, komputerswiat.pl, autoswiat.pl, newsweek.pl, forbes.pl, fakt.pl. Additionally, it manages VOD.pl, Jakdojade.pl, Skąpiec, MonetEasy, nk.pl, Sympatia.pl, Opineo, Zapytaj, Literia, Zumi, LaModa.pl, lendi.pl.

In Serbia, the company is a press publisher of: it publishes Blic, Blic Žena, NIN and Elevate and Original magazines and is the owner of blic.rs, zena.rs, nin.rs, noizz.rs, ana.rs, pulsonline.rs, clip.rs. In Slovakia, it is the publisher of services: Aktuality.sk, Živé.sk, šport.sk and dobruchut.sk, NOIZZ.sk, recepty.sk, najmama.sk, diva.sk. In Hungary, it publishes: Blikk, Kiskegyed, Kiskegyed Recepttár, NOIZZ.hu, Blikk Nők, Auto Bild, Glamour, GEO, service publisher: Blikk.hu.

== Activity on the advertising market ==
In Poland, the company is the owner of Gratka.pl, morizon.pl and co-owner: No Fluff Jobs and StepStone Polska. In Serbia, it owns Nekretnine.rs, MojAuto.rs. In Slovakia the company owns: bazar.sk, ViaReal, Real Soft, chaty.sk, byty.sk, novostavby.sk, reality.sk, Top Reality, Nehnuteľnosti.sk, Autobazar.sk, Autobazar.eu, noveauta.sk, noveauto.sk, autovia.sk, Autozor, ABmanager.sk. Ringier Axel Springer Slovakia also belongs to Ringier: Pokec, azet.sk, Bistro.sk. In Lithuania, Latvia and Estonia the companies belong to the CVmarket employment website portal.
