= Trybuna Śląska =

Polish daily newspaper

- Founded: 1945; 80 years ago
- Ceased publication: 2004
- Language: Polish
- Headquarters: Katowice, Poland

Trybuna Śląska (Polish pronunciation: [trɘˈbu.na ˈɕlɔns.ka]) was a Polish regional newspaper published in Katowice from 1945 to 2004.

== History ==
Originally named Trybuna Robotnicza until 1990, it was the regional Silesian authority of the ruling Polish United Workers' Party. After the fall of the Polish People's Republic, it was renamed Trybuna Śląska.

== Circulation ==
Its circulation amounted to 120,000 on weekdays and about 700,000 on weekends. It was distributed throughout three provinces: Katowice Voivodeship, Bielsko-Biała Voivodeship and Częstochowa Voivodeship.

== Ownership ==
After a period of brief co-ownership by Robert Hersant, the newspaper was acquired by Verlagsgruppe Passau, who published Dziennik Zachodni. After 2000, investors gradually limited the scope and circulation of the newspaper, until it was fully abolished in 2004.
