= Jan Miodek =

Polish linguist, prescriptive grammarian and professor

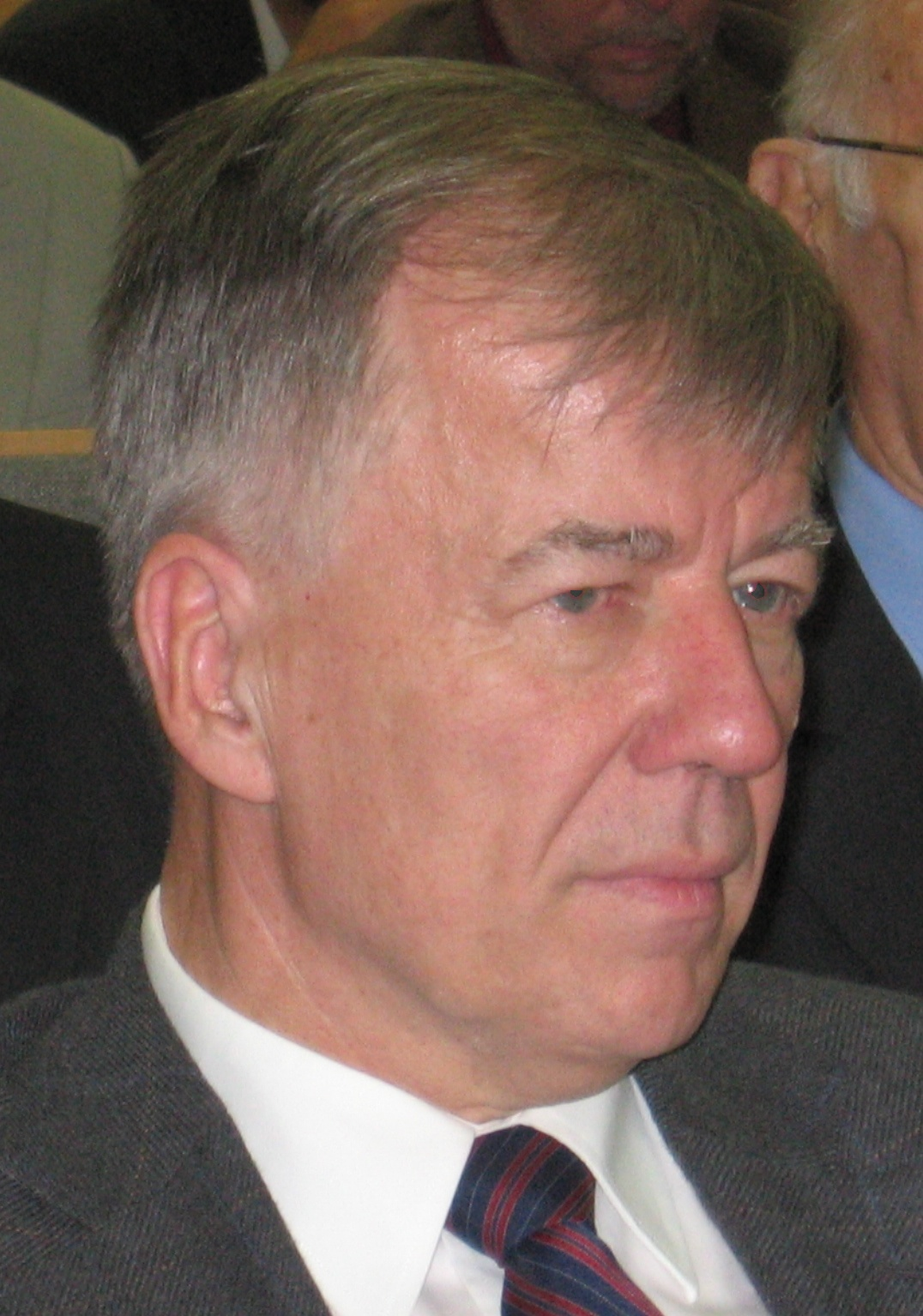
- Professor Jan Miodek
- Born: 7 June 1946 (age 80); Tarnowskie Góry, Silesian Voivodeship, Polish People's Republic
- Education: Wrocław University
- Scientific career
- Fields: linguistics, prescriptive grammar

Jan Franciszek Miodek (born 7 June 1946 in Tarnowskie Góry, Silesian Voivodeship), is a Polish linguist, a prescriptive grammarian and a professor of Wrocław University. He is regarded as one of the most prominent educators and promoters of the standard Polish language.

== Life and career ==
He was born on 7 June 1946, in Tarnowskie Góry. His father was Franciszek Miodek and his mother was Janina (née Kowalska). In 1963, he graduated from the Stanisław Staszic High School No.2 in Tarnowskie Góry.

Since 1967, he has been working as a columnist at the Gazeta Wrocławska newspaper, running the weekly Rzecz o języku linguistic column. Since 1989 he has held the post of the head (director) of the Institute of Polish Philology at the University of Wrocław. Between 1987 and 2007, he hosted a popular weekly TV program Ojczyzna polszczyzna devoted to the Polish language. He also created such programs as Profesor Miodek odpowiada and Słownik polsko@polski.

Since 2015, he has co-hosted the Polska z Miodkiem (Poland with Miodek) program in which he discusses the etymology of various words in the Polish language.

== Awards and honours ==
- Wojciech Korfanty Award
- Wiktor Award (1988, 1991, 1998)
- Superwiktor Award (1998)
- Honorary degree of the Lithuanian University of Educational Sciences
- Honorary degree of the Opole University
- Honorary Citizen of the City of Wrocław
- Honorary Citizen of the City of Tarnowskie Góry
- Silver Medal for Merit to Culture – Gloria Artis (2015)

== See also ==
- List of Poles
