= Echo Dnia =

Polish daily newspaper

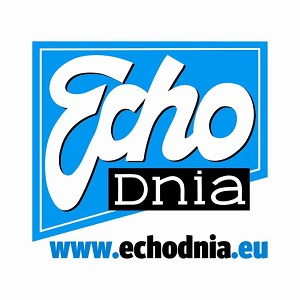
- Type: Daily newspaper
- Format: Compact
- Owner(s): Media Regionalne Sp.z.o.o, Kielce
- Editor: Stanisław Wróbel
- Founded: December 1, 1971
- Language: Polish
- Headquarters: ul.Targowa 18,25-520 Kielce
- Circulation: 21,952 (August 2014)
- Website: www.echodnia.eu

Echo Dnia (Polish pronunciation: [ˈɛxɔ ˈdɲa]; English: Echo of the Day) is a Polish regional daily newspaper based in Kielce. It was established in 1971 and is one of the best-selling regional newspapers in Poland, according to the Inspection of the Press Distribution.

== History ==
Privatized in 1991, the Kielce Agency of Trade and Marketing became the owner of Acumen. On July 8 of that year, the newspaper underwent a redesign and format update. In 1992, ownership transferred again, this time to the Mitex construction enterprise, which was owned by prominent Kielce businessman Michał Sołowow.

== Overview ==
The newspaper is printed in three editions: Kielce, Radom, and Subcarpathian. Its editorial operations are based in Kielce, with additional branches located in Radom and Tarnobrzeg. The newspaper is distributed in three provinces: Świętokrzyskie Voivodeship, Subcarpathian Voivodeship (four districts: Mielec, Nisko, Stalowa Wola, and Tarnobrzeg), and South Masovian, Radom, and Przysucha. Fixed themes are attached to the basic newspaper: on Monday — Super Sports Echo, on Tuesday — My House, on Wednesday — Our Style, on Thursday — Health, on Friday — Super Relaxation, and finally on Saturday — Laid-back. In some districts, weekly programs include: Ponidzie Echo, Echo of Powiśle, Echo of Końskie, Echo Skarżysko-Kamienna, Starachowice Echo, Echo of Ostrowiec Świętokrzyski, Jędrzejów Echo, and Włoszczowa Echo.

On June 1, 2006, Echo of the Day united with the Word, keeping the old title. Currently, the newspaper belongs to the British Mecom Group with Stanisław Wróbel as the editor-in-chief.

Its print and e-edition circulation was 21,952 in August 2014.
