= Gość Niedzielny =

Polish weekly Catholic news magazine

- Editor-in-chief: Adam Pawlaszczyk
- Categories: News magazine
- Frequency: Weekly
- Format: National-Catholicism
- Total circulation (October 2016): 181,960
- Founded: 1923; 102 years ago
- Country: Poland
- Based in: Katowice
- Language: Polish
- Website: Gość Niedzielny

Gość Niedzielny (Polish: [ˈɡɔɕt͡ɕ ɲɛˈd͡ʑɛl.nɨ]; lit. Sunday Guest) is a Polish weekly Catholic news magazine. It is published in Katowice.

The magazine circulation in 2011 was 198,500 copies. The print and e-edition circulation of the weekly was 136,003 in August 2014.

The magazine was established in 1923 as a newspaper of the Roman Catholic Archdiocese of Katowice.

== See also ==
- List of magazines in Poland
