= Rzeczpospolita (newspaper) =

Polish newspaper

- The front page of Rzeczpospolita on 8 April 2013
- Format: Compact
- Owner: Gremi Media SA
- Editor: Bogusław Chrabota
- Founded: 1920 (revived in 1944 and 1982)
- Language: Polish
- Headquarters: Warsaw
- Circulation: 24,000 (2025)
- Sister newspapers: Parkiet
- ISSN: 0208-9130
- OCLC number: 264077858
- Website: www.rp.pl (in Polish)

Rzeczpospolita (Polish pronunciation: [ʐɛt͡ʂpɔsˈpɔlita]) is a Polish nationwide daily economic and legal newspaper, published by Gremi Media. Established in 1920, Rzeczpospolita was originally founded as a daily newspaper of the conservative Christian National Party during interwar Poland. The paper's title is a translation of the Latin phrase res publica (meaning "republic", or "commonwealth"), and is part of the traditional and official name of the Polish state, "Rzeczpospolita Polska."

The newspaper came under government control during the Polish People's Republic (1945–1989). Following the 1989 political revolutions across Europe, the new democratically-elected government relinquished its editorial oversight and ownership of Rzeczpospolita, contributing to the end of media censorship in communist Poland and ushering in a new era of independent press.

In 2016, Rzeczpospolita had a circulation of 274,000; 75% of its readers were reported to have higher education. Rzeczpospolita is among the most frequently cited media sources in the country and is considered a newspaper of record for Poland.

== History ==
The paper was founded by Ignacy Jan Paderewski and the first issue was published on 15 June 1920. Paderewski sold the paper in 1924 to Wojciech Korfanty, another prominent politician of that time. The editor-in-chief Stanisław Stroński sought to maintain the quality of the content by cooperating with a group of authors, including Adolf Nowaczyński, Kornel Makuszyński, and Władysław Witwicki. The last issue of Rzeczpospolita in the Second Polish Republic was published on the last day of 1931.

During World War II (1940–1943), an irregular paper associated with a Polish resistance group Polish People's Independence Action was issued under the same title.

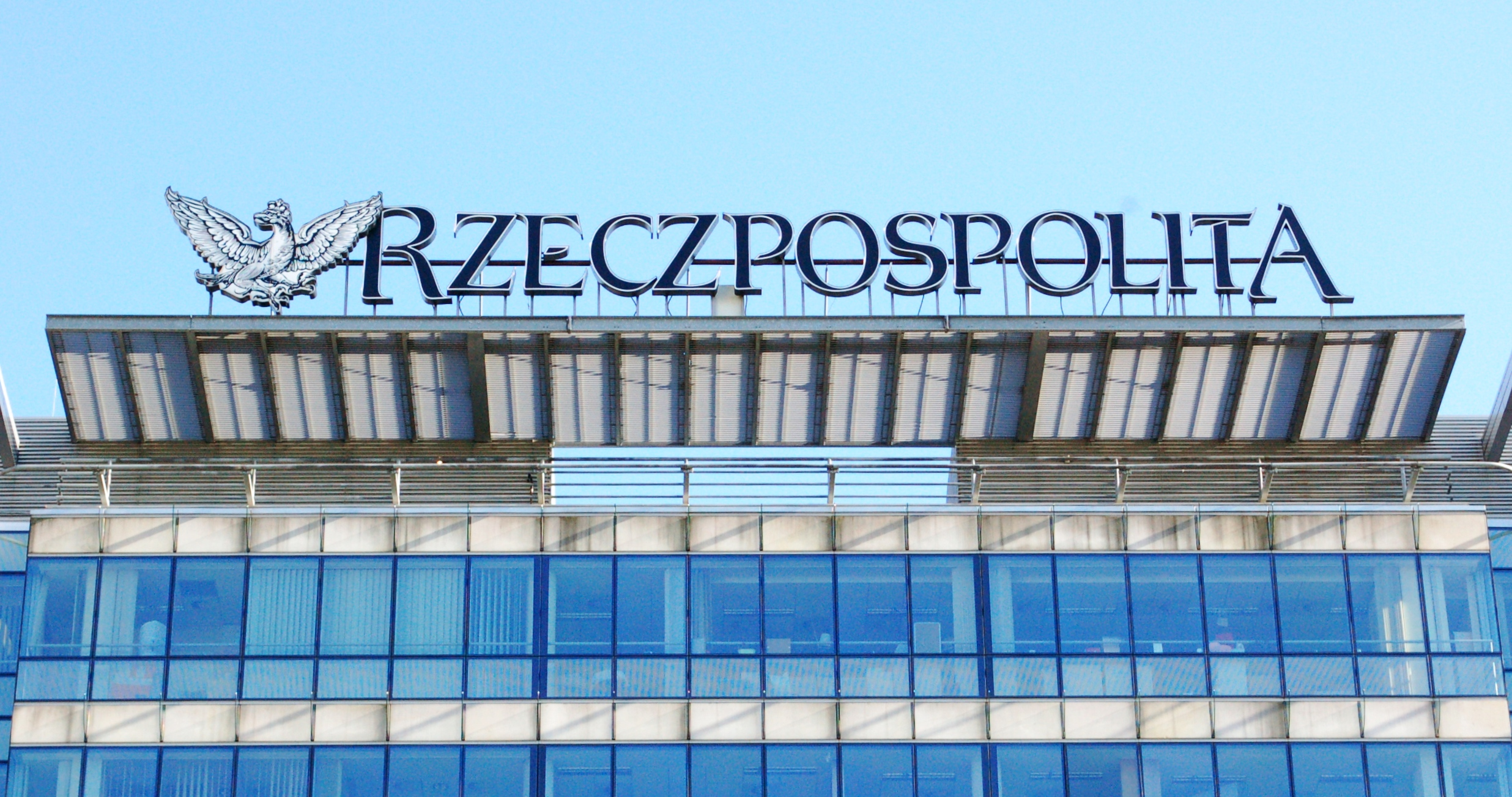
Logo on the main building

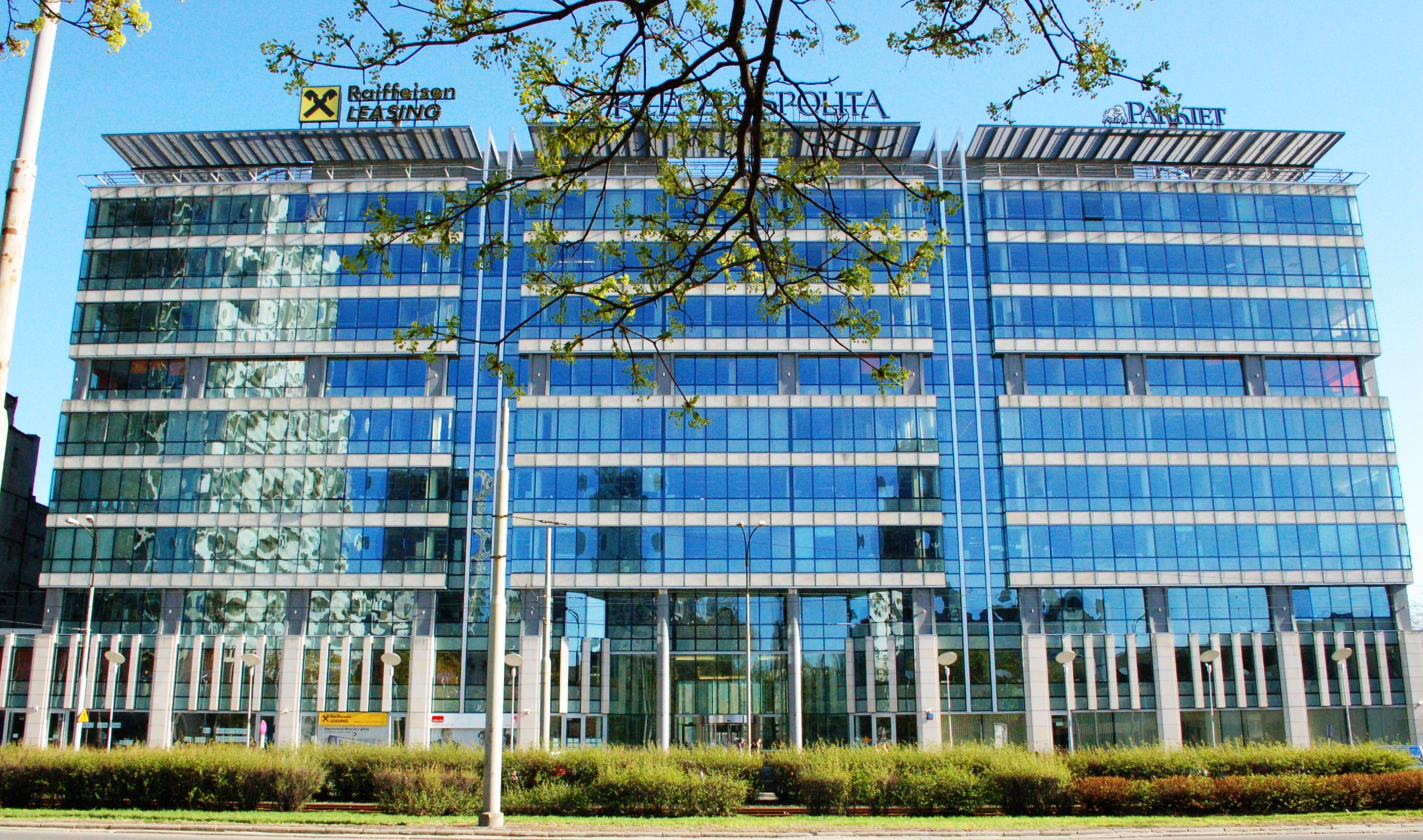
Headquarters of Rzeczpospolita on Prosta Street in Warsaw

On 23 July 1944, when the war had not yet ended, the first issue of Rzeczpospolita, a newspaper of the Polish Committee of National Liberation, was published in Chełm. The editor-in-chief was Jerzy Borejsza, a communist activist and journalist during the interwar years, who collaborated with Russians, and later presented opinions in line with the Kremlin. The newspaper began strenuous endeavours to form a positive image of the new government. The Home Army commanders and their decision to commence the Warsaw Uprising were criticised, while nationalisation and land reform were supported.

After the war, Rzeczpospolita was issued by a cooperative publishing house Czytelnik whose president was Borejsza himself. He delegated the editorial duties to Paweł Hoffman, who soon changed the title to Rzeczpospolita. Dziennik Gospodarczy (The Economic Daily), and later to Rzeczpospolita. Dziennik Polityczno-Gospodarczy (The Economic and Political Daily). In 1949, with a new chief editor Henryk Korotyński, the paper joined the campaign against the Roman Catholic Church.

In December 1948, the state authorities had established another newspaper Trybuna Ludu (People's Tribune), an organ of a newly formed political party, the Polish United Workers' Party. Rzeczpospolita had been issued by another two years, until 1951 when it was discontinued because the coexistence of several party newspapers was considered unfavorable for a consolidated one-party state. A part of the team joined Głos Pracy, while others including Korotyński moved to Życie Warszawy.

In 1980, the state had faced a crisis, and consequently the party's overall image deteriorated significantly. This prompted the idea to relaunch a separate government newspaper. In the spring of 1981, thus during the rise of Solidarity, Edmund Osmańczyk, member of parliament of the Polish People's Republic, proposed to revive Rzeczpospolita as a "governmental medium presenting the position of the state on a daily basis". Józef Barecki, former editor of Trybuna Ludu, a member of the Central Committee of the Communist Party and of the parliament, as well as a government spokesman for a year, was appointed as the editor-in-chief. The first issue of the new Rzeczpospolita appeared during martial law, on 14 January 1982.

The state, as an entity, had become officially independent from the party (even though this independence was still largely fictitious within a communist state). Thus, from 1982 onwards, Rzeczpospolita and Trybuna Ludu resumed their parallel existence as the official bulletins of the government and the party apparatus respectively. This dualism corresponded to the situation in the Soviet Union, where the government newspaper Izvestia functioned alongside the party's Pravda, and where Izvestia has steered a course strikingly similar to Rzeczpospolita in the 1990s.

After, the partially free elections of 4 June 1989, and after Tadeusz Mazowiecki became Prime Minister, the management of the newspaper changed as well. Rzeczpospolita was no longer a government medium, and became an independent newspaper. Its new editor-in-chief was Dariusz Fikus (until 1996).

The new Polish government made Rzeczpospolita legitimately independent. In February 1991, Państwowe Przedsiębiorstwo Wydawnicze "Rzeczpospolita", a state publishing company, with Maciej Cegłowski as the new CEO, together with the French Robert Hersant press group, Presse Participations Europennes, established Presspublica company. Its first CEO was the then editor-in-chief of Rzeczpospolita, Dariusz Fikus. Initially, the Polish shareholder held 51% of company shares, while the French owned 49%. In 1993, Rzeczpospolita was named the Newspaper of the Year by the Pheidippides Committee.

In the mid-1990s, the Polish party sold the additional 2% of shares to the French. In 1996, the Norwegian Orkla Media corporation acquired shares held by the Robert Hersant group. During the next 10 years, 51% of shares were held by the subsidiary of Orkla Press Polska, Presspublica Holding Norway, while 49% belonged to Państwowe Przedsiębiorstwo Wydawnicze "Rzeczpospolita" (from 1 March 2000, to Przedsiębiorstwo Wydawnicze "Rzeczpospolita" SA). In October 2006, the shares of Orkla Press Polska were taken over by Mecom Poland Holdings SA forming part of the British Mecom Group.

In October 2011, Gremi Media, owned by the Polish entrepreneur Grzegorz Hajdarowicz, purchased the shares from Mecom Poland and the shares belonging to PW Rzeczpospolita (the State Treasury), becoming a 100% shareholder of Presspublica publishing house. The publishing house changed its name to Gremi Media, after which, in January 2017, it was transformed into a joint stock company operating under the business name of Gremi Media SA.

== Contents ==
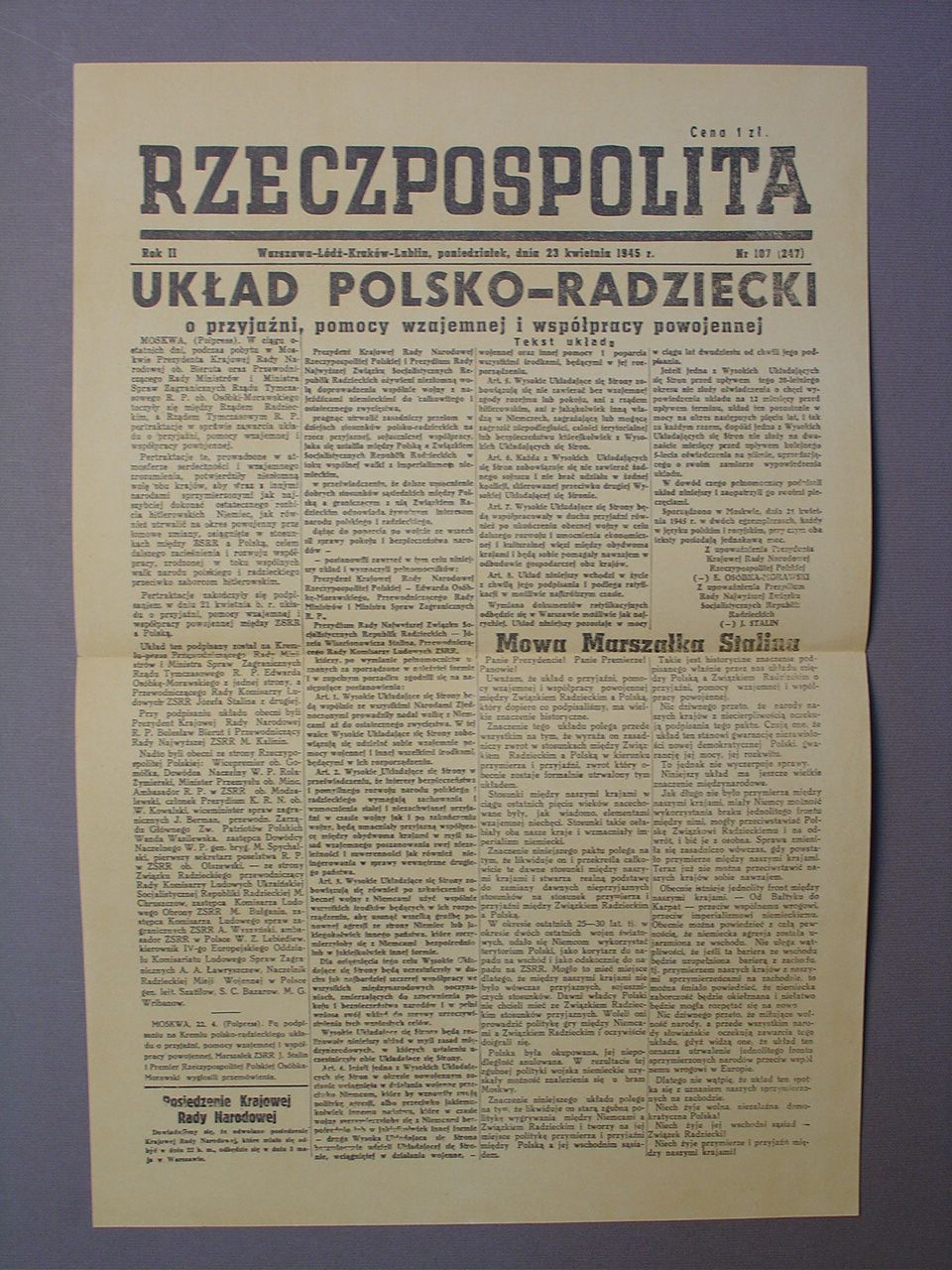
Rzeczpospolita newspaper cover from 1945

The basic edition of Rzeczpospolita is divided into four sections: the main one, dedicated to general news; the economic one (Ekonomia i rynek), the legal one (Prawo co dnia); and the regional one (Życie Regionów).

The general news section features, e.g., information on current political events, reports from Poland and abroad, commentaries and essays, expert opinions, as well as news relating to culture, science, lifestyle, or sports. Prawo co dnia ("Law Every Day") focuses on the changes in regulations and legislation and on legal analyses, including articles on labour law, analyses and expert opinions, or industry-related communications. Ekonomia i rynek ("Economy and Market") provides information about markets, enterprises, finance, current stock quotes, analyses of the economic situation and trends in Poland and abroad, as well as opinions of economists, experts and representatives of the business world.

The nationwide issue of the newspaper includes a series of regional monthly supplements entitled Życie Regionów ("Life of the Regions"). They are dedicated to important investments, business and education in the regions, as well as matters related to local politics, sports, and culture. Życie Regionów is the organiser of public debates that are crucial for local communities, as well as the media partner of major regional events.

On Saturdays, Plus Minus, the weekend edition of Rzeczpospolita, appears, containing articles related to civilisation, literature, lifestyle and metapolitics. It mainly includes essays, commentaries and feature articles, as well as reviews of books and cultural and sporting events. Interviews form a particularly important part of Plus Minus.

== Supplements ==
Newspaper subscription includes such specialised supplements as Podatki (taxes), Administracja (administration), Rzecz o prawie (law), Ekspert Księgowego (accounting), Praca i ZUS (labour and social security matters), or Prawo w Biznesie (law in business).

Dobra Firma ("Good Company") is a daily supplement to the main issue. It is primarily addressed to entrepreneurs from the SME sector. In an easy-to-understand manner, it covers both the legal issues relevant to business owners (taxes, social security, contracts, employment), and business matters (marketing of new products, business ideas, available solutions relating to company vehicles).

Nieruchomości ("Real Estate") appears on Mondays and Fridays. On Mondays, topics relating to construction and housing are presented, while on Fridays, matters related to the commercial real estate market are covered.

Every Tuesday, Rzeczpospolita Cyfrowa ("Digital Republic") is issued with Rzeczpospolita, dedicated to new technologies, with particular focus on their application in running a business and in developing new business branches.

Moje Pieniądze ("My Money") is a Thursday supplement devoted to personal finance. It offers tips on saving and investing money, buying shares and choosing insurance.

The Friday supplement is Rzecz o Historii ("The thing about History"), offering informative articles and historical analysis.

== Lists and rankings ==
Regular publications of Rzeczpospolita include lists and rankings of companies, brands and institutions operating on the Polish market. The best known are: the 500 List, the 2000 List, the Ranking of the Most Valuable Polish Brands, and the Ranking of Law Firms.

=== The 500 List ===
The list of the largest Polish companies by revenue, first published in 1999. Modelled on the Fortune list, it is now the only such ranking in Poland. The best developing companies on the list receive the prestigious Rzeczpospolita Eagles awards.

=== The 2000 List ===
The list of the best companies according to Rzeczpospolita, first published in 2002. It takes into account their revenues, employment, and results. The ranking of the largest exporters is published as a supplement. Outstanding enterprises from the list receive the Good Company, Exports Eagle and Exports Brand awards.

=== The Ranking of the Most Valuable Polish Brands ===
The Ranking of the Most Valuable Polish Brands provides a professional valuation of over 300 brands created specifically for the needs of the Polish market. Apart from value, the strength of brands in separate industry categories is also estimated. The ranking has been published since 2003.

=== The Ranking of Law Firms ===
The ranking includes law firms servicing enterprises and operating on the Polish market. Law firms are broken down, among others, in terms of the number of lawyers and legal counsels, the generated revenues and profits, the servicing of the leading market transactions, or the best lawyers in respective areas of law. The ranking has been published since 2003.

Until 2007, Rzeczpospolita was published in the classic broadsheet format. The format then changed to compact, a modern and more functional one.

== Style ==
In 2005, the newspaper received the Grand Front award, and in 2006, during the 27th edition of the competition organised by the Society for News Design, Rzeczpospolita was named "The best designed newspaper in the world". Rzeczpospolita received the Grand Front award also in 2013, for the best cover (dedicated to the resignation of Pope Benedict XVI).

== Website ==
rp.pl was one of the first online news services in the Polish media. The service has operated for 25 years as of 2022, having been launched in March 1997. From November 2014, it has been using RWD technology (full responsiveness). Its current version has been available since 2015.

The website has over 32 million hits and 3 million unique users per month (data as of January 2017).Rp.pl is one of the most frequently visited nationwide newspaper websites. In the "Business-Finance-Law" category, Gremi Group is ranked the 6th among all Polish groups of online services.

=== Mobile application ===
Rzeczpospolita application for mobile devices combines 5 types of content: printed issues in PDF format, printed newspaper edition in digital form (HTML), videos from Rzeczpospolita.tv (VOD), live streaming of Rzeczpospolita.tv programs, and the latest news from rp.pl service (Najnowsze z RP.pl newsfeed).

The application is available on Google Play and Apple App Store.

=== Online TV ===
Since 2009, a video service of Rzeczpospolita has been available at tv.rp.pl. In 2016, an online Rzeczpospolita TV was launched at the same address, currently broadcasting 24/7. Its core are the three daily live programs, "RZECZoPOLITYCE", "RZECZoBIZNESIE" and "RZECZoPRAWIE", as well as commercial programs and coverage of the events organised by Rzeczpospolita. The hosts are well-known Rzeczpospolita contributors, such as Bogusław Chrabota, Michał Szułdrzyński, Marcin Piasecki, Jacek Nizinkiewicz, Ewa Usowicz, Tomasz Pietryga, or Anna Wojda.

The channel is broadcast via Google Hangouts and can be watched daily through the home page of rp.pl. All programs are also available as VOD on tv.rp.pl.

== Circulation and sales ==
A single average issue of Rzeczpospolita is about 65,000 copies. In 2016, approximately 54,000 copies were sold.

== Paper version and digital subscription ==
Rzeczpospolita is distributed through paper version subscription, paper version sales and digital version. Subscription is divided into Basic subscription and Plus subscription dedicated to a more involved, specialised audience. Subscription of Rzeczpospolita offers features such as professional book publications, training, multimedia tools, or access to the archives.

The digital version of Rzeczpospolita is available around 21:00 CET. on the day preceding the day of paper edition.

== Opinion leader ==
Rzeczpospolita has been often rated as the most frequently quoted medium in Poland, and it is considered a newspaper of record for Poland.

In 2014, it was considered the most opinion-making medium of the decade (2004–2013). Also in 2016, Rzeczpospolita won in the ranking of the most influential media in Poland, prepared on a regular basis by the Media Monitoring Institute.

== Editorial staff ==
The editorial staff currently consists of 150 persons (including the secretariat and editors of online content). The headquarters are located in Warsaw at ul. Prosta 51.

=== Editors-in-chief ===
- 1989–1996 – Dariusz Fikus
- 1996–2000 – Piotr Aleksandrowicz
- 2000–2004 – Maciej Łukasiewicz
- 2004–2006 – Grzegorz Gauden
- 2006–2011 – Paweł Lisicki
- 2011–2012 – Tomasz Wróblewski
- 2012 – Andrzej Talaga (acting editor-in-chief)
- 2013–present – Bogusław Chrabota

== See also ==
- Rzeczpospolita
- List of newspapers in Poland
