= De Mol (TV series) =

Belgian reality game show

- De Mol series banner
- Also known as: The Mole
- Genre: Reality game show
- Created by: Michiel Devlieger; Bart De Pauw; Tom Lenaerts; Michel Vanhove
- Presented by: Michiel Devlieger; Gilles De Coster
- Country of origin: Belgium
- Original language: Dutch
- No. of series: 13

Production
- Running time: 60–80 minutes
- Production company: Woestijnvis

Original release
- Network: TV1 (1998–2000, 2003); VIER/Play4/Play (2016–)
- Release: 6 December 1998 – present

De Mol (The Mole) is a Belgian reality game show that originally aired from 6 December 1998 to 19 March 2000 and again from 19 January to 16 March 2003 on TV1 with Michiel Devlieger as host. A revival has aired since 1 February 2016 on Play (known as Play4 until 2025 and known as VIER until 2021) with Gilles De Coster as host. The show won the famous Rose d'Or award in 2000. The format has been licensed in 40 countries from all around the world.

Players in The Mole must work together to complete various physical and mental challenges to build up a significant prize for the winner. One of them, however, is "the Mole", a double agent hired by the producers to sabotage the efforts of the group. The Mole must be careful to avoid drawing too much suspicion to themself. Using journals, players must track vast amounts of data about the person(s) they suspect of being the Mole, such as seating positions, clothing colours, minor discussion topics, and so on. The quiz at the end of each episode tests players' knowledge of the Mole, and determines by lowest score (or slowest time, in the event of a tie) who is eliminated from the game.

== Format ==
Each series of The Mole involves a group of contestants. During each episode, the contestants participate in a number of challenges, each assigned a monetary value. However, one of these contestants has been selected by production to be the Mole; it's their job to try to prevent the other players from winning challenges without revealing themself to others. The Mole is told what challenges to expect, but not always how to sabotage them; they must decide whether to intervene and how they do so.

To eliminate someone, all contestants take a quiz (which consists of 20 questions) at the end of every episode regarding the identity of the Mole and their involvement in the previous activities. The player who scores the lowest on this quiz, or was slowest to answer in case of a tie, is eliminated from the game. When there are only three players remaining, including the Mole, the winner of the game is the one that answers the most questions correctly on the final quiz. The final quiz is usually 30 questions.

While success in the challenges builds up potential winnings, it is also critical to stay in the game by scoring better than opponents on the quiz, usually by attempting to draw their suspicions of the Mole's identity toward oneself. Since the Mole must use subterfuge to misdirect attention from their attempts to derail the team, disingenuous attempts to emulate the Mole must be subtle, while still noticeable and suspicious.

Each season may also offer various advantages such as safety/exemption from elimination (vrijstelling) or tokens which increase a player's score on the quiz (pasvragen). Earning or claiming these usually come at the cost of money from the group pot.

== Series overview ==
Series	Premiere	Finale	Host	The Mole	Winner	Runner-up	Amount won	International destination
1	6 December 1998	31 January 1999	Michiel Devlieger	Magda Ral	Hugo De Bie	Armand "Mon" De Ridder	BEF 1,150,000	France
2	23 January 2000	19 March 2000	Michiel Devlieger	Hugo Daemen	Marianne Dupon	Niki De Boeck	BEF 1,145,000	Spain
3	19 January 2003	15 March 2003	Michiel Devlieger	Mark Simons	Stijn Vandaele	Sandra Welvaert / Inge Boere	€33,100	Italy
4	1 February 2016	28 March 2016	Gilles De Coster	Gilles Van Bouwel	Cathy van der Ha	Hanne Vanhaesebrouck	€30,790	Argentina
5	6 February 2017	3 April 2017	Gilles De Coster	Eline Michiels	Davey Van Rode	Annelies Cooymans	€27,250	South Africa
6	25 March 2018	20 May 2018	Gilles De Coster	Pieter Delanoy	Lloyd Vermeulen	Bahador Sabouri	€27,665	Mexico
7	10 March 2019	12 May 2019	Gilles De Coster	Elisabet Haesevoets	Axel Pailler	Bas Moeyaert	€34,050	Vietnam
8	8 March 2020	26 April 2020	Gilles De Coster	Alina Churikova	Jolien Derck	Bart Lintermans	€22,835	Greece
9	21 March 2021	9 May 2021	Gilles De Coster	Lennart Driesen	Annelotte De Brandt	Sven Uyttersprot	€18,240	Germany
10	20 March 2022	8 May 2022	Gilles De Coster	Philippe Minguet	Sven Pede	Yens Wittebrouck	€26,390	Canary Islands (Spain)
10	20 March 2022	8 May 2022	Gilles De Coster	Uma Vandemaele (Note: During the fourth episode of season 10, Philippe withdrew from the game due to mental health reasons, also revealing that he was the Mole. A new Mole was selected among the remaining six candidates at the end of the episode.)	Sven Pede	Yens Wittebrouck	€26,390	Canary Islands (Spain)
11	19 March 2023	7 May 2023	Gilles De Coster	Comfort Achuo	Lancelot De Deurwaerder	Toos Vandervelde	€27,320	Arizona (United States)
12	24 March 2024	12 May 2024	Gilles De Coster	Senne van der Zweep	Bernard Balcaen	Michaël Moens	€24,160	Sicily (Italy)
13	23 March 2025	11 May 2025	Gilles De Coster	Sarah Loos	Alexy Kilozo	Michèle Vergote	€27,910	Thailand
14	29 March 2026	17 May 2026	Gilles De Coster	Wout Calluy	Julie Den Hondt	Maxim Quidousse	€20,430	Portugal

=== Locations map ===
Locations of the Belgian version of The Mole.

== International versions ==
In total, over 50 series/seasons of The Mole have been broadcast around the world, since its inception in 1998 in Belgium.

Legend:

(3) Currently airing
(1) Upcoming airing
(17) No longer airing

Country	Name	Host(s)	TV station	Premiere	Finale
Australia	The Mole	Grant Bowler	Seven	27 February 2000	28 September 2003
Australia	The Mole	Tom Williams	Seven	25 August 2005	28 October 2005
Australia	The Mole	Shura Taft	Seven	2 July 2013	16 October 2013
Bulgaria	Къртицата; Kartitsata	Ivan Hristov	TV7	26 March 2013	17 May 2014
Bulgaria	Къртицата; Kartitsata	Andrey Arnaudov	TV7	26 March 2013	17 May 2014
Catalonia	El Talp	Pol Izquierdo	TV3	2003	2003
Finland	Myyrä	Roope Salminen	MTV3	1 January 2019	present
France; Belgium (Wallonia)	Qui est la taupe ?	Stéphane Rotenberg	M6; RTL-TVI (Belgium)	1 July 2015	5 August 2015
Germany	Der Maulwurf – Die Abenteuershow	Michael Stich	ProSieben	7 July 2000	25 November 2001
Germany	Der Maulwurf – Die Abenteuershow	Steven Gatjen	ProSieben	7 July 2000	25 November 2001
Germany	The Mole – Wem kannst du trauen?	The BossHoss	Sat.1	6 May 2020	24 June 2020
Hungary	A Tégla	László Szalma	TV2	28 March 2000	May 2000
Hungary	A Tégla	TBA	TV2	2027	TBA
Israel	מי החפרפרת; Ha-Chafarperet	Itai Anghel	Channel 2 (Keshet)	13 February 2001	2001
Italy	La Talpa	Amanda Lear; Paola Perego	Rai 2	30 January 2004	2 April 2004
Italy	La Talpa	Paola Perego	Italia 1	20 September 2005	22 November 2005
Italy	La Talpa	Paola Perego	Italia 1	9 October 2008	27 November 2008
Italy	La Talpa	Diletta Leotta	Canale 5	5 November 2024	25 November 2024
Netherlands	Wie is de Mol?	Angela Groothuizen	AVRO (1999–2014); AVROTROS (2015–); NPO Start (2024)	19 November 1999	present
Netherlands	Wie is de Mol?	Karel van de Graaf	AVRO (1999–2014); AVROTROS (2015–); NPO Start (2024)	19 November 1999	present
Netherlands	Wie is de Mol?	Pieter Jan Hagens	AVRO (1999–2014); AVROTROS (2015–); NPO Start (2024)	19 November 1999	present
Netherlands	Wie is de Mol?	Art Rooijakkers	AVRO (1999–2014); AVROTROS (2015–); NPO Start (2024)	19 November 1999	present
Netherlands	Wie is de Mol?	Rik van de Westelaken	AVRO (1999–2014); AVROTROS (2015–); NPO Start (2024)	19 November 1999	present
Netherlands	Wie is de Mol?	Hila Noorzai	AVRO (1999–2014); AVROTROS (2015–); NPO Start (2024)	19 November 1999	present
Netherlands	Wie is de Mol? Junior	Sipke Jan Bousema	Nederland 3	17 May 2008	21 June 2008
Netherlands	Wie is de Mol? Junior	Art Rooijakkers	Nederland 3	9 March 2014	27 April 2014
New Zealand	The Mole	Mark Ferguson	TV2	2000	2000
Norway	Muldvarpen	Lars Arentz-Hansen	TVNorge	31 January 2000	9 December 2002
Norway	Muldvarpen	Ove Christian Owe	TVNorge	31 January 2000	9 December 2002
Poland	Agent	Marcin Meller	TVN	22 October 2000	22 December 2002
Poland	Agent – Gwiazdy	Kinga Rusin	TVN	23 February 2016	2019
Portugal	O Sabotador	Paulo Nery	RTP1	9 September 2001	4 November 2001
Spain	El Traidor	Luis Larrodera	Cuatro	12 July 2006	8 September 2006
Spain	El Topo	Daniel Domenjó	Telecinco	25 June 2009	July 2009
Sweden	Mullvaden	Pontus Gårdinger	Kanal 5	2000	2001
Sweden	Mullvaden	Hans Fahlén	Kanal 5	2007	2007
Sweden	Mullvaden	—N/a	Discovery+	2 November 2021	8 December 2022
Ukraine	Крот; Krot	Konstantin Stognii	ICTV	24 October 2014	26 December 2014
United Kingdom	The Mole	Glenn Hugill	Channel 5	12 January 2001	9 December 2001
United States	The Mole	Anderson Cooper	ABC	9 January 2001	18 February 2004
United States	The Mole	Ahmad Rashad	ABC	9 January 2001	18 February 2004
United States	The Mole	Jon Kelley	ABC	2 June 2008	11 August 2008
United States	The Mole	Alex Wagner	Netflix	7 October 2022	12 July 2024
United States	The Mole	Ari Shapiro	Netflix	7 October 2022	12 July 2024

== See also ==
- De Verraders
