= Romuald Roman =

Polish writer (born 1949)

Romuald 'Aldek' Roman
- Born: Romuald Roman; July 12, 1949 (age 77); Nowy Sacz, Poland
- Occupation: writer
- Writing career
- Pen name: July 12, 1949,
- Language: Polish
- Notable work: Zakopiański Dom Wariatów

Romuald Roman (July 12, 1949, Nowy Sącz, Poland) is a Polish writer.

== Biography ==
Romuald Roman is a graduate of the Agricultural University of Kraków (1971) and Temple University in Philadelphia, PA, USA.

Mountain-climber, teacher, skier, Superfund program Remedial Project Manager (RPM) in the EPA (where he was an environmental scientist), UN consultant in Poland and Romania. Took part in the project to clean up Neville Island, which had been a toxic waste site for Pittsburgh industrial plants.

He writes short stories, vignettes, and essays based on his reminiscences of life in Poland decades ago (including his early days in Zakopane) and on his personal impressions of America after emigrating there in the 1980s. His book, "Zakopianski Dom Wariatow" (The Zakopane Madhouse) won the Reader's Award in the contest "Best Book in Winter 2015" in the category "Newest Nuggets".

== Works ==
- Przystanek Idaho (Idaho Stop) Warsaw, 2000, ISBN 83-85660-66-6
- Kierunek Filadelfia (Direction: Philadelphia!) Warsaw, 2005, ISBN 978-83-89889-06-5
- Ośrodek Zero. Tajemnica Doliny Syrokiej Wody (The 'Zero' Resort. A Mystery of the Syroka Woda Valley) Warsaw, 2014, ISBN 978-83-7942-230-2
- Zakopiański dom wariatów (The Zakopane Madhouse) Warsaw, 2015, ISBN 978-83-6196-830-6
- Benjamin Franklin radzi jak żyć, Chestnut Hill Press, Philadelphia, 2022 ISBN 979-8-9857500-5-8
- Aldek's Bestiary, Chestnut Hill Press, Philadelphia, 2022, ISBN 979-8-9857500-1-0

== Bibliography ==
- Maciej Krupa, „Zakopiański wariat” in: Tygodnik podhalański no. 51-52 (1345), 17 Dec., 2015.
- Sergiusz Pinkwart: Preface to: „Zakopiański wariat”, Warsaw, 2015.
- Michał Kamiński Endorses New Book on Benjamin Franklin From Chestnut Hill Press
