= Agent (TV series) =

- Also known as: Agent – Gwiazdy
- Genre: Reality
- Presented by: Marcin Meller (A); Kinga Rusin (AG)
- Narrated by: Jarosław Łukomski (AG)
- Theme music composer: Two Steps from Hell
- Opening theme: "Haiganon"
- Country of origin: Poland
- Original language: Polish
- No. of seasons: 3 (A) + 3 (AG)
- No. of episodes: 30 (A) + 39 (AG)

Production
- Production locations: Original; France (season 1); Spain (season 2); Portugal (season 3); Celebrity; South Africa (season 4); Argentina (season 5); Hong Kong and Indonesia (season 6); Spain (season 7)
- Running time: about 45 minutes
- Production company: Jake Vision

Original release
- Network: TVN
- Release: October 29, 2000 – 2019

Related
- The Mole

Agent (The Mole), or Agent – Gwiazdy (The Mole – Stars), is the Polish version of the Belgian reality competition television series, De Mol.

== History ==
The first season premiered on TVN on October 29, 2000, and aired for three seasons. It was hosted by Marcin Meller. In 2016 the show returned, this time hosted by Kinga Rusin, and the first edition was filmed in South Africa; it premiered on February 23, 2016.

The second celebrity season, which was filmed in Argentina, premiered on February 14, 2017. The third celebrity season premiered on February 21, 2018, and was recorded in Hong Kong and on Bali island (Indonesia), making the Polish version only the third Mole version worldwide to stage a season in any Asian country (after the Dutch and Belgian, respectively).

== Series overview ==
Season	Year	Host	Mole	Winner	Runner-up	Total prize money	Potential prize money	Destination
Agent
1	2000	Marcin Meller	Agnieszka	Liwia	Jerzy	111 400 PLN	200 000 PLN	France
2	2001	Marcin Meller	Mirosław	Bartosz	Hanna	125 000 PLN	250 000 PLN	Spain
3	2002	Marcin Meller	Mirosław	Małgorzata	Wojciech	121 500 PLN	300 000 PLN	Portugal
Agent – Gwiazdy
1 (4)	2016	Kinga Rusin	Hubert Urbański	Antoni Królikowski	Tamara Gonzalez Perea	68 400 PLN	149 900 PLN	South Africa
2 (5)	2017	Kinga Rusin	Odeta Moro	Daria Ładocha	Jarosław Kret	71 200 PLN	175 800 PLN	Argentina
3 (6)	2018	Kinga Rusin	Ilona Ostrowska	Michał Mikołajczak	Karolina Ferenstein-Kraśko	83 300 PLN	283 350 PLN	Hong Kong; Indonesia (Bali)
4 (7)	2019	Kinga Rusin	Maria Sadowska	Damian Kordas	Michał Koterski	81 900 PLN	194 500 PLN	Spain (Canary Islands)

== Seasons ==
=== Season 1 (2000) ===
==== Contestants ====
Player	Age	Outcome
Wojciech	26	11th Place
Romuald	45	10th Place
Piotr	37	9th Place
Izolda	33	8th Place
Danuta	41	7th Place
Małgorzata	34	6th Place
Izabela	49	5th Place
Jakub	26	4th Place
Remigiusz	23	3rd Place
Jerzy	48	Runner-up
Agnieszka	25	The Mole
Liwia	28	Winner

=== Season 2 (2001) ===
==== Contestants ====
Player	Age	Outcome
Daniel	29	11th Place
Barbara	44	10th Place
Jolanta	30	9th Place
Wojciech	35	8th Place
Beata	25	7th Place
Dariusz	35	6th Place
Joanna	29	5th Place
Dorota	31	4th Place
Roman	42	3rd Place
Hanna	42	Runner-up
Mirosław	29	The Mole
Bartosz	30	Winner

=== Season 3 (2002) ===
==== Contestants ====
Player	Age	Outcome
Kamila	26	11th Place
Artur	29	10th Place
Adam	29	9th Place
Alżbieta	21	8th Place
Aneta	20	7th Place
Teresa	40	6th Place
Przemysław	22	5th Place
Ryszard	25	4th Place
Grażyna	26	3rd Place
Wojciech	36	Runner-up
Mirosław	43	The Mole
Małgorzata	41	Winner

=== Season 4 (2016) ===
==== Celebrities ====
The complete list of participants was revealed on 12 January 2016. Participation of Jabłczyńska, Maślak, Sieradzky, Szczawińska and Urbański was announced on 9 January 2016. On 11 January 2016, it was confirmed that Królikowski, Szpak and Tajner-Wiśniewska would join the line-up.

Player	Age	Known for	Outcome
Rafał Maślak	27	Mister Poland 2014	13th Place
Piotr ''Vienio'' Więcławski	39	Rapper, Music Producer	12th Place
Kamila Szczawińska	31	Model	11th Place
Michał Szpak	25	X Factor runner-up, and Eurovision contestant	10th Place
Maciej Sieradzky	28	Project Runway runner-up	9th Place
Eva Halina Rich	45	Reality television star	8th Place
Sylwia Szostak	26	Fitness model, personal trainer	7th Place
Tomasz Oświeciński	43	Bodybuilder, actor	6th Place
Monika Mrozowska	36	Actress	5th Place
Dominika Tajner-Wiśniewska	39	Music manager	4th Place
Joanna Jabłczyńska	30	Na Wspólnej actress	3rd Place
Tamara Gonzalez Perea	23	Fashion blogger	Runner-up
Hubert Urbański	50	Television presenter	The Mole
Antoni Królikowski	27	Actor	Winner

==== Termination chart ====
Termination Chart
Player	Week 1	Week 2	Week 3	Week 4	Week 5	Week 6	Week 7	Week 8	Week 9	Week 10	Week 11	Week 12	Final
Antoni	OUT	IN	IN	IN	IN	IN	IN	IN	IN	IN	IN	IN	WON
Hubert	IN	IN	IN	IN	IN	IN	IN	IN	IN	IN	IN	IN	MOLE
Tamara	IN	IN	IN	IN	IN	IN	IN	IN	IN	IN	IN	IN	RUNNER-UP
Joanna	IN	IN	IN	IN	IN	IN	IN	IN	IN	IN	OUT		
Dominika	IN	IN	IN	IN	IN	IN	IN	IN	IN	OUT			
Monika	IN	IN	IN	IN	IN	IN	IN	IN	OUT				
Tomasz	IN	IN	IN	IN	IN	IN	IN	OUT					
Sylwia	IN	IN	IN	IN	IN	IN	OUT						
Eva Halina	IN	IN	IN	IN	IN	OUT							
Maciej	IN	IN	IN	IN	OUT								
Michał	IN	IN	IN	OUT									
Kamila	IN	IN	OUT										
Vienio	IN	OUT											
Rafał	IN	OUT											

Indicates the player won the game
Indicates the player was the mole
Indicates the player won an exemption for the next quiz
Indicates the player lost an exemption
Indicates the player used freebies on the quiz to correct one or more wrong answers
Indicates the player used one or more freebies on the quiz and was terminated
Indicates the player scored the lowest on the quiz without holding any freebies or exemptions and was terminated
Indicates that the player was originally eliminated, but was brought back because of the other players' votes

=== Season 5 (2017) ===
==== Celebrities ====
The complete list of participants was revealed on 23 January 2017.

Player	Age	Known for	Outcome
Michał Będźmirowski	31	Fashion blogger	13th Place
Agnieszka Rylik	42	Boxer, TVN reporter	12th Place
Julita Jula Fabiszewska	25	Singer	11th Place
Mateusz Maga	24	Model, Top Model contestant, singer	10th Place
Tomasz ''Niecik'' Niecikowski	34	Disco polo singer	9th Place
Joanna Jędrzejczyk	29	Mixed Martial Artist	8th Place
Olga Frycz	30	Actress	7th Place
Edyta Zając-Rzeźniczak	29	Model	6th Place
Marek Włodarczyk	62	Actor	5th Place
Piotr Kędzierski	34	Radio host, music journalist	4th Place
Alan Andersz	28	Actor and Dancer	3rd Place
Jarosław Kret	53	Weather presenter	Runner-up
Odeta Moro	39	Television presenter, journalist	The Mole
Daria Ładocha	34	Culinary blogger	Winner

==== Termination chart ====
Termination Chart
Player	Week 1	Week 2	Week 3	Week 4	Week 5	Week 6	Week 7	Week 8	Week 9		Week 10	Week 11	Week 12	Final
Daria	IN	IN	IN	IN	IN	IN	IN	IN	IN	IN	IN	IN	IN	WON
Odeta	IN	IN	IN	IN	IN	IN	IN	IN	IN	IN	IN	IN	IN	MOLE
Jarosław	IN	IN	IN	IN	IN	IN	IN	IN	IN	IN	IN	IN	IN	RUNNER-UP
Alan	IN	IN	IN	IN	IN	IN	IN	IN	IN	IN	IN	OUT		
Piotr	IN	IN	IN	IN	IN	IN	IN	IN	IN	OUT	IN	OUT		
Marek	IN	IN	IN	IN	IN	IN	IN	IN	OUT	IN	OUT			
Edyta	IN	IN	IN	IN	IN	IN	IN	OUT						
Olga	IN	IN	IN	IN	IN	IN	OUT							
Joanna	IN	IN	IN	IN	IN	OUT								
Tomasz	IN	IN	IN	IN	OUT									
Mateusz	IN	IN	IN	OUT										
Jula	IN	IN	OUT											
Agnieszka	IN	OUT												
Michał	OUT													

Indicates the player won the game
Indicates the player was the mole
Indicates the player won an exemption for the next quiz
Indicates the player lost an exemption
Indicates the player lost an exemption, but used one or more freebies (jokers) on the quiz to correct one or more wrong answers
Indicates the player used freebies (jokers) on the quiz to correct one or more wrong answers
Indicates the player used one or more freebies (jokers) on the quiz and was terminated
Indicates the player used black freebies on the quiz and it invalidates all other freebies (jokers) used by the players on the test
Indicates the player scored the lowest on the quiz without holding any freebies or exemptions and was terminated
Indicates that the player was originally eliminated, but was brought back because of the other players' votes

=== Season 6 (2018) ===
==== Celebrities ====
Player	Age	Known for	Outcome
Victor Borsuk	29	Kitesurfer	13th Place
Maciej Myszkowski	44	Former Model and Architect	12th Place
Jan Kuroń	34	Culinary Blogger	11th Place
Anna Skura	32	Blogger and Traveller	10th Place
Beniamin Andrzejewski	25	Actor	9th Place
Julia Wróblewska	19	Actress	8th Place
Maja Włoszczowska	34	Mountain Biker, Olympic Medalist	7th Place
Anna Lucińska	31	Actress	6th Place
Rysiek 'Peja' Andrzejewski	41	Rapper	5th Place
Piotr Świerczewski	46	Former Footballer	4th Place
Tomasz Ciachorowski	38	Actor	3rd Place
Karolina Ferenstein-Kraśko	42	Amazon, Owner of Horse Stable	Runner-up
Ilona Ostrowska	43	Actress	The Mole
Michał Mikołajczak	31	Actor	Winner

=== Season 7 (2019) ===
==== Celebrities ====
Player	Age	Known for	Outcome
Krystyna Czubówna	64	Journalist	13th Place
Edyta Górniak	46	Singer	12th Place
Aleksander Doba	73	Traveller	11th Place
Agata Nizińska	33	Singer, Actress	10th Place
Mariola Gołota	50	Lawyer, wife of Andrzej Gołota	9th Place
Andrzej Gołota	51	Boxer	8th Place
Rafał Jonkisz	21	Mister Poland 2015, Model	7th Place
Wiktor Mrozik	26	YouTuber, Model, Dancer	6th Place
Katarzyna Wołejnio	45	Reality television star, Actress, Producer	5th Place
Angelika Mucha	21	Blogger, YouTuber	4th Place
Violetta Kołakowska	41	Actress, Model, Stylist	3rd Place
Michał Koterski	39	Actor, Television presenter	Runner-up
Maria Sadowska	42	Singer, Screenwriter, Film director	The Mole
Damian Kordas	25	Culinary Blogger, YouTuber, Winner of MasterChef	Winner
