= Robert Mazurek (journalist) =

Polish journalist

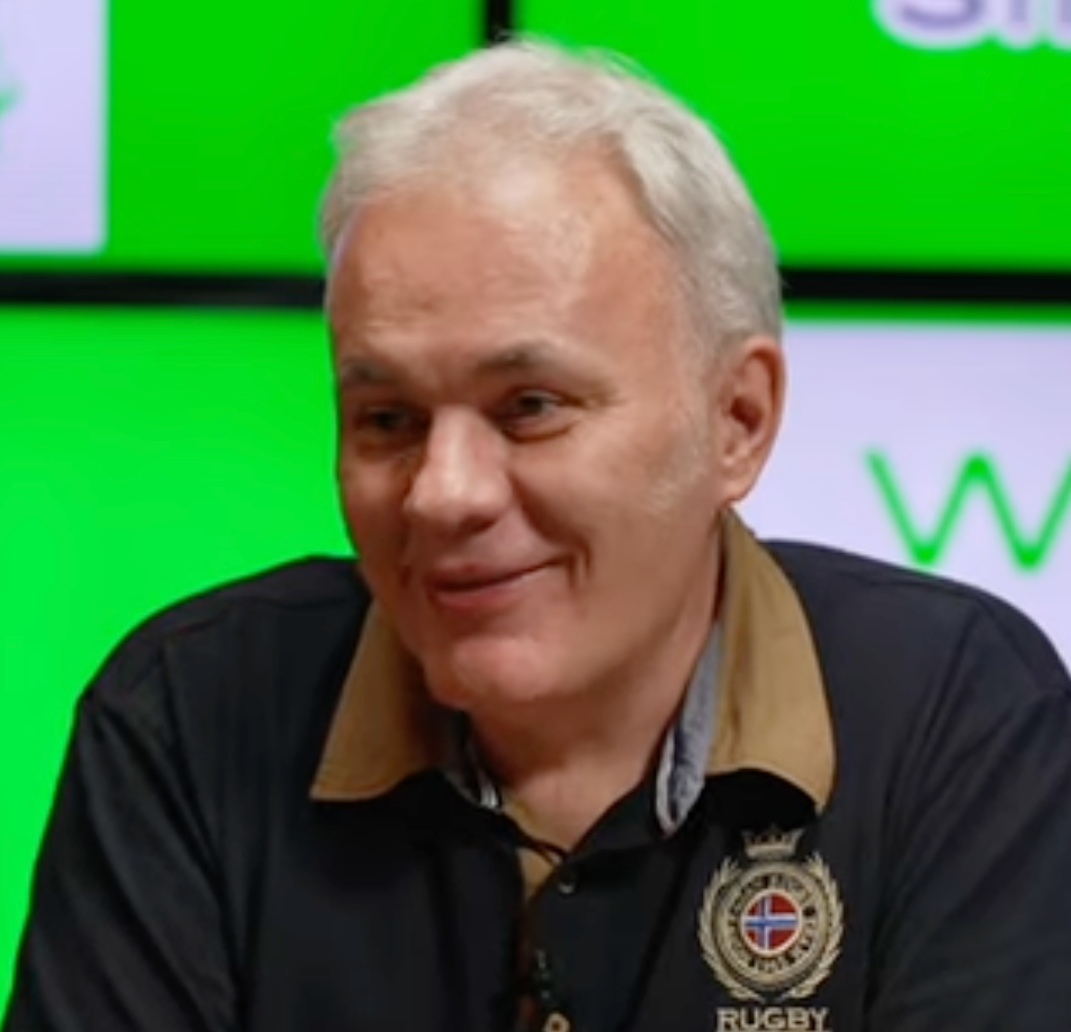
- Mazurek in 2024
- Born: Robert Tomasz Mazurek; 17 September 1971 (age 54); Lidzbark Warmiński, Poland
- Occupation(s): Journalist, columnist

Robert Tomasz Mazurek (born 17 September 1971) is a Polish journalist, columnist and traveler.

== Education ==
Mazurek was born in Lidzbark Warmiński, Poland. He is a graduate of journalism at the University of Warsaw, where he also conducts classes with students.

== Career ==
=== Journalistic career ===
Since the early 1990s, Robert Mazurek published reports and essays on his travels, focusing particularly on countries in the former Soviet Union, the Balkans, the Middle East, and Africa. His works appeared in publications such as Nowe Państwo, Tygodnik Powszechny, Rzeczpospolita, and Dziennik. From 2010 onwards, his travel columns have been featured monthly in Poznaj Świat. He served as deputy editor-in-chief at the monthly magazine Film, and contributed as a journalist to Życie and Wprost. Between 2006 and 2009, Mazurek penned columns and conducted weekly interviews under Rozmowa Mazurka in Dziennik, transferring them to Rzeczpospolita in September 2009 (Wywiady Mazurka continued in the weekend edition of Plus Minus until December 2016). He was also a co-founder of the quarterly publication Fronda.

Mazurek wrote journalistic pieces and historical reports for the weekly magazine Nowe Państwo. He notably conducted the first Polish interview with the judge Stefan Michnik, who resided in Sweden, and with Kazimierz Mijal.

In collaboration with Igor Zalewski, Mazurek initiated the satirical column Z życia koalicji, z życia opozycji in the weekly Nowe Państwo in April 1998. This column provided an overview of political events through short, sarcastic, and ironic notes. The authors introduced several concepts into public discourse, including terms like the Belarusian Television branch in Warsaw (in reference to TVP during the presidency of Robert Kwiatkowski, Brunatny Robert (about Robert Kwiatkowski), and the most famous Polish mulatto (about Andrzej Lepper). The Rywin affair was first detailed in this column.

The column gained significant popularity in the weekly Wprost from 2002 to 2010, and later moved (from June 2010) to Fakt. From 2011 to 2012, it was published in the weekly Uważam Rze, and from December 2012 to June 2018 in the weekly Sieci. His columns are currently featured on the portal wPolityce.pl, associated with the weekly W Sieci, under the series Pół porcji mazurka.

Since 2011, Mazurek has contributed wine columns to the weekly magazine Uważam Rze, and since 2013 to the weekly Sieci. Since February 2017, he has conducted interviews for the weekend edition of Dziennik Gazeta Prawna. From October 2018, his columns Wina Mazurka and Mazurek na wynos have been published in "Plus Minus", the weekend supplement of the daily Rzeczpospolita.

In 2010, he was awarded the Golden Fish for Best Columnist.

In 2021, Mazurek and Krzysztof Stanowski published a poetry book titled Kmioty Polskie, with proceeds donated to charity.

=== Radio and television career ===
In 2005, alongside Igor Zalewski, he co-hosted the program Lekka jazda Mazurka i Zalewskiego on TVP1. He later hosted the morning edition of #dziejesienazywo on Wirtualna Polska in 2016. Since September 2016, he has hosted Poranna Rozmowa on RMF FM. Starting July 2020, he has led the program Mazurek słucha on Polskie Radio Program II, engaging in conversations with prominent figures from media, culture, and art about their favorite music. He co-hosted the journalistic program Mazurek & Stanowski with Krzysztof Stanowski on the Kanał Sportowy YouTube channel. Since February 2024, the ''Mazurek & Stanowski'' program has been continued on a new YouTube channel, Kanał Zero.
