= Joanna Pinkwart =

Polish journalist (born 1985)

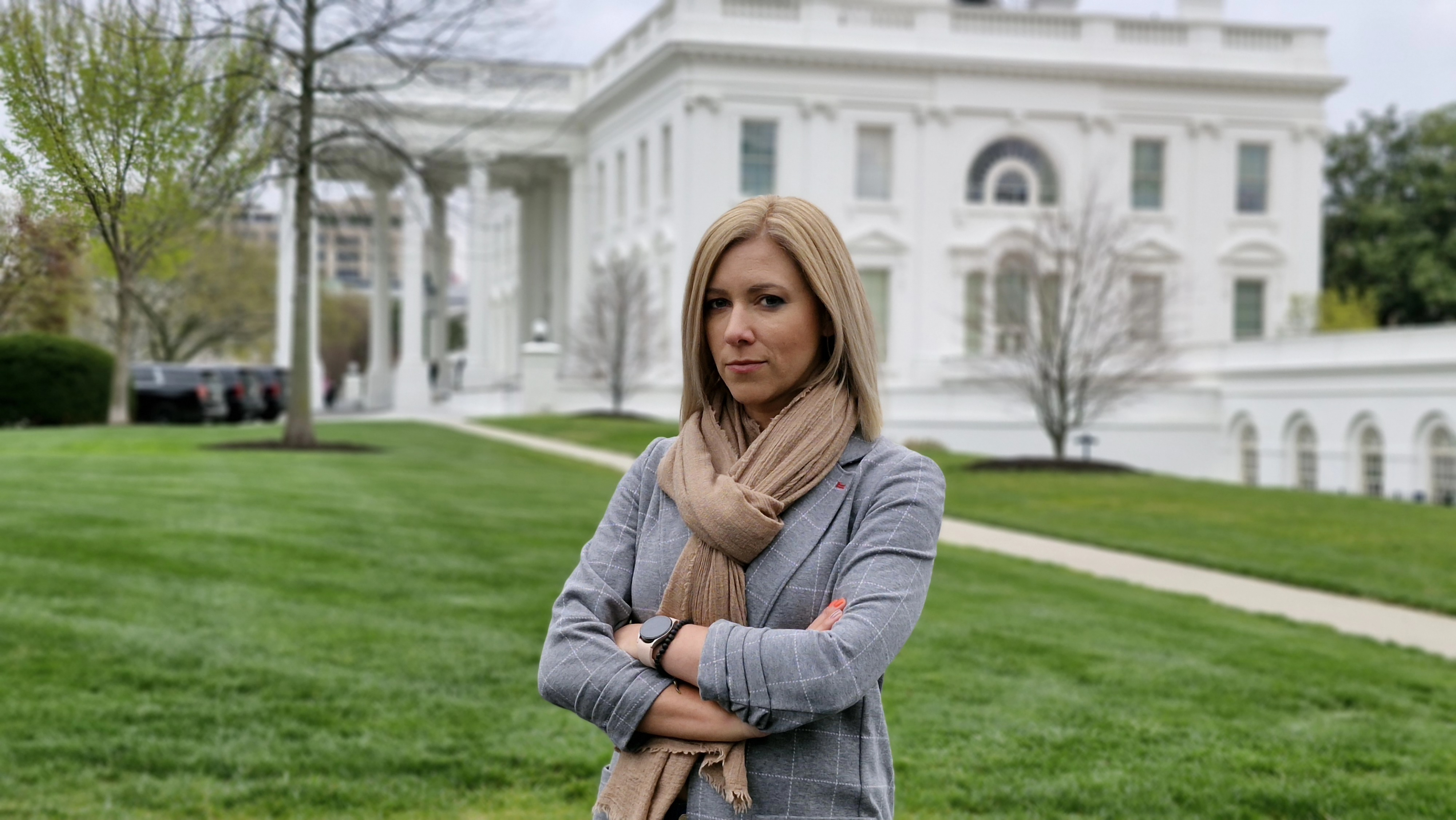
- Joanna Pinkwart (Washington D.C.)
- Born: 1985 (age 40–41)
- Occupation: journalist
- Years active: 2001–present
- Employer(s): TVP1, TVP2, TVP Info, TVP World, TVP Kultura, Kanał Zero

Joanna Pinkwart [jɔˈanna ˈpinkvart] (born September 1, 1985, in Szczawnica) is a Polish journalist. Former US correspondent for Polish Television, the largest media corporation in Poland, currently associated with Kanał Zero.

== Life and career ==
Joanna Pinkwart attended the State Primary School of Art Techniques in Zakopane and Seweryn Goszczynski High School in Nowy Targ. After that she studied political science at the Department of Political and International Studies of the Jagiellonian University. Her professional career started from the cooperation with the editing offices of "Tygodnik Podhalański" weekly, and "Dziennik Polski" daily, and then continued at the editing office of the RMF Classic Radio in Cracow. Since June 2007 she has been part of the team of the TVP (public Polish Television) first working at the local "Kronika" – daily news service from Cracow, and after December 2009 – in Warsaw, as the editor of "Teleexpress" – nationwide daily news and TVP Info – the largest Polish news channel. Since June 2019 she has been a foreign correspondent for TVP in Washington D.C., replacing Zuzanna Faltzman, and working together with Rafał Stańczyk. Until march 2024, Joanna Pinkwart was the only Polish journalist accredited at NASA for reports from John F. Kennedy Space Center at Cape Canaveral in Florida.

In March 2024, after 17 years, she finished working for public television and moved to Kanał Zero.

== More famous TV coverage ==
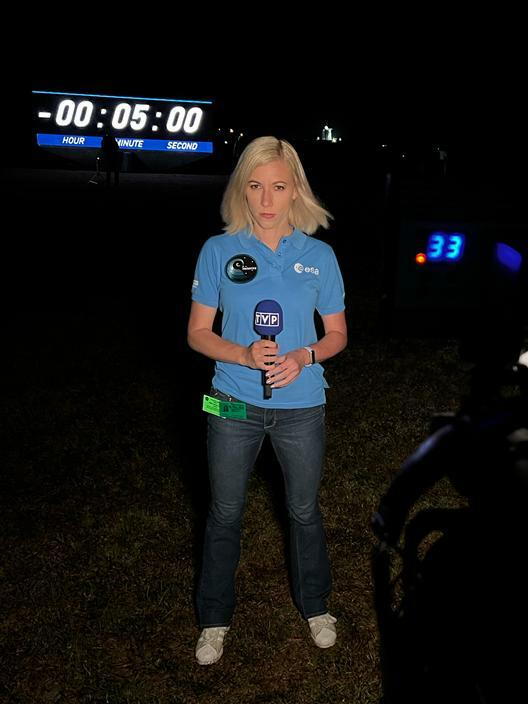
Joanna Pinkwart (Cape Canaveral)

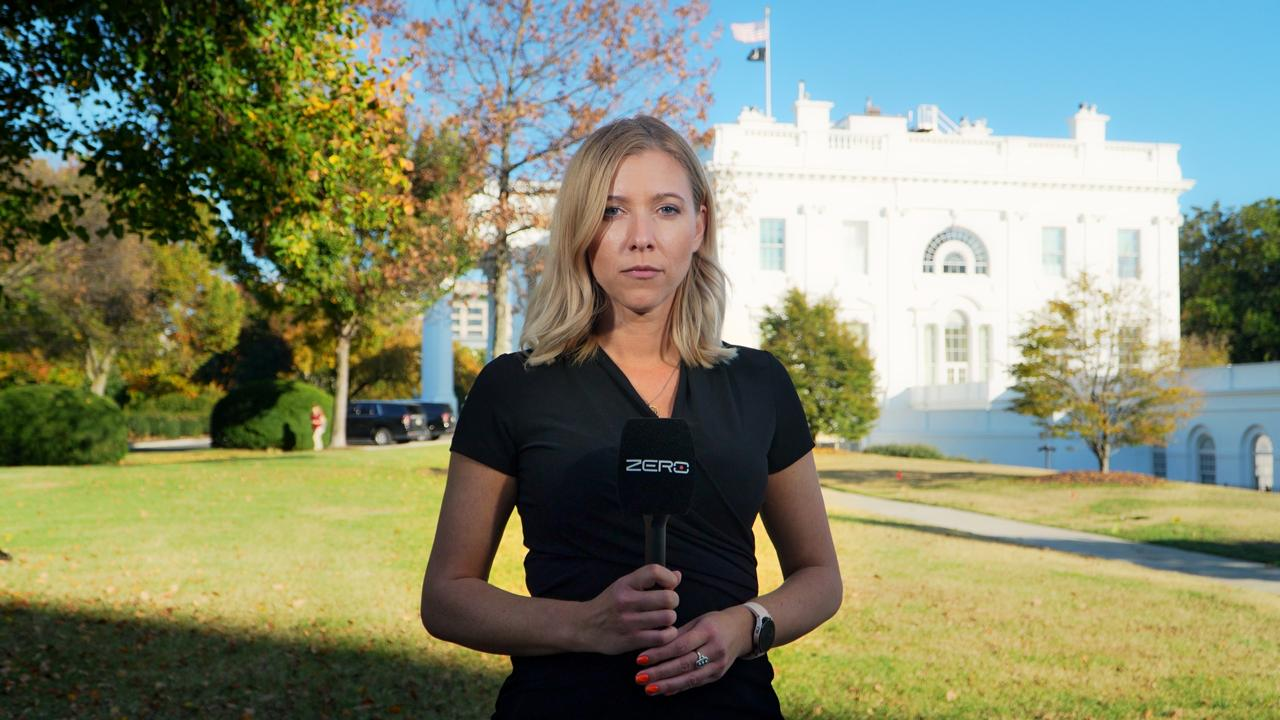
Washington DC, November 4, 2024 (presidential election)

- SARS–CoV–2 pandemic in the USA, political decisions, social reactions
- Case of George Floyd, social and political consequences, including the reform of the US Police;
- 2020 US presidential election presidential election and Joe Biden presidency;
- 2022 United States House of Representatives elections;
- The reaction of Joe Biden's administration to the Russian agesya in Ukraine, meetings of Polish politicians with the American authorities and as part of the United Nations General Assembly, US economic aid to Europe after February 24, 2022;
- 2022 World Athletics Championships;
- Central funeral ceremonies after Pelé's death;
- Take-offs of NASA and SpaceX space missions after the resumption of flights after the end shuttles era, Artemis program.
- The 2024 US Election Campaign and Election. From Washington, D.C for Channel Zero
- Papal conclave and election of Pope Leo XIV. From Rome for Channel Zero.

== Reportages (selected) ==
- "Piekło misjonarza" (2012), the report from war in Afghanistan;
- "Polscy ratownicy w Nepalu" (2015), the report about firefighters-rescuers in Nepal (Discovery cooperation);
- "Owoce Rewolucji" (2016), the report on the fate of the leaders of the "Arab Spring" in Tunisia.

== Family ==
Daughter of the writer Maciej Pinkwart and the sister of the traveler and journalist Sergiusz Pinkwart.

== See also ==
- Mass media in Poland
