= Adam Daniel Rotfeld =

Polish academician and diplomat (born 1938)

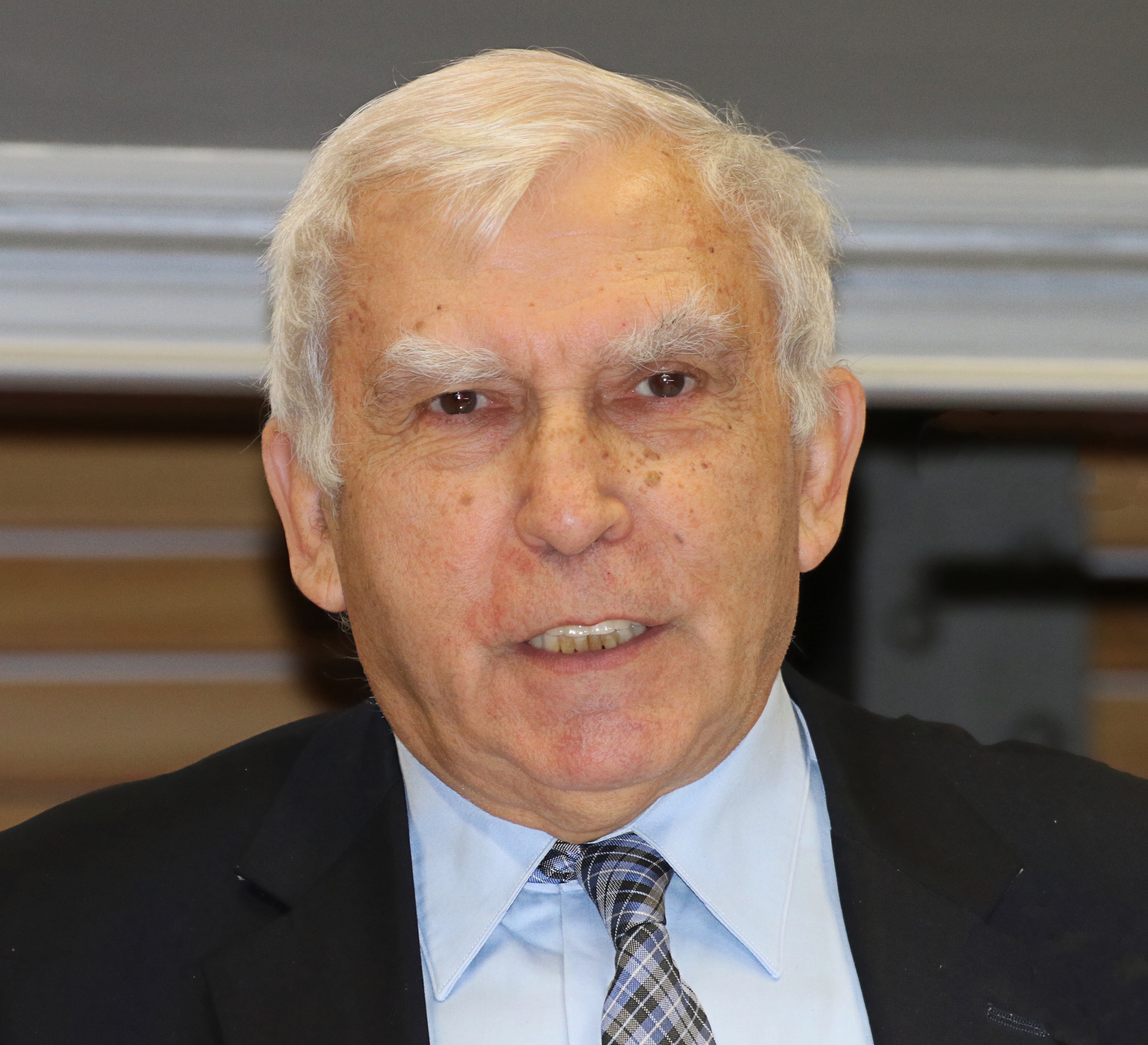
- Rotfeld in 2017

Minister of Foreign Affairs
- In office 5 January 2005 – 31 October 2005
- Prime Minister: Marek Belka
- Preceded by: Włodzimierz Cimoszewicz
- Succeeded by: Stefan Meller

Personal details
- Born: 4 March 1938 (age 88) Przemyślany, Poland (now Peremyshliany, Ukraine)
- Party: Independent
- Spouse: Barbara Sikorska (died 2006)
- Children: 1
- Profession: Diplomat, academician

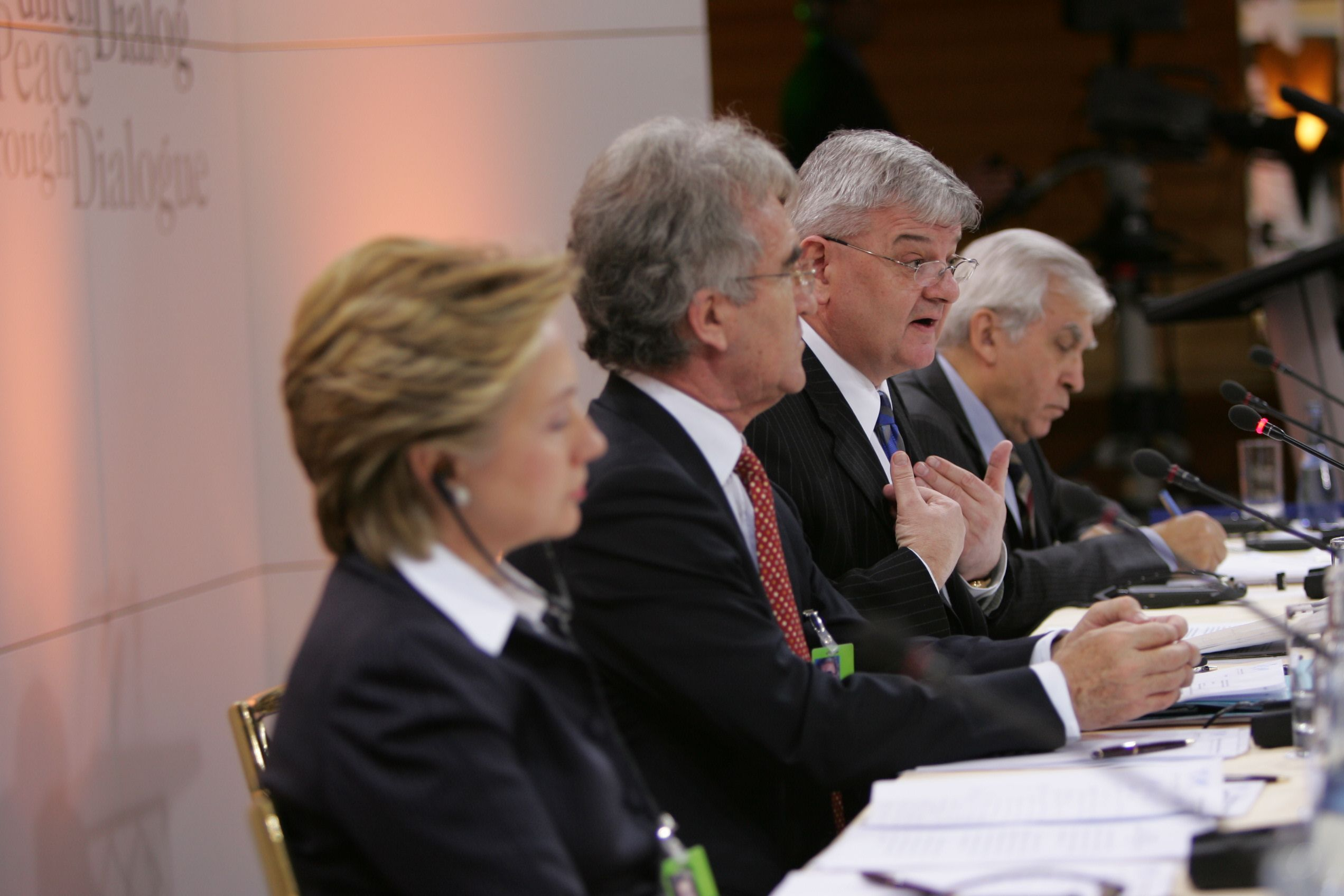
Rotfeld with US Senator Hillary Clinton and German Minister of Foreign Affairs Joschka Fischer

Adam Daniel Rotfeld (Polish pronunciation: ['adam ˈdaɲɛl ˈrɔtfɛlt]; born 4 March 1938) is a Polish academician and diplomat who was Minister of Foreign Affairs of Poland from 5 January to 31 October 2005. He served earlier as deputy foreign minister. While in that position, Rotfeld established the Warsaw Reflection Group on UN Reform and the Transformation of the Euro-Atlantic Security Institutions, with participation from leading US and European experts and politicians.

From 1991 to 2002, he served as Director of the Stockholm International Peace Research Institute (SIPRI) and in 1989–1991 project leader on Building a Cooperative Security System in and for Europe at SIPRI.

== Life ==
Rotfeld was born on 4 March 1938, in Przemyślany, near Lwów, Poland (now Lviv, Ukraine). He survived the Holocaust in the Univ Lavra, a monastery of the Studite Brethren. During the war he was among people who received the Paraguayan citizenship certificate issued by Ładoś Group.

Rotfeld was married to Barbara Sikorska-Rotfeld (died in 2006) and has one daughter, Alicja, born in 1971.

Rotfeld studied international law and diplomacy in Warsaw (1955–1960). He wrote his PhD dissertation on the right of self-determination of people in modern international law at the Jagiellonian University, Kraków which he defended in 1969. Later, habilitation on European Security in Statu Nascendi. He was appointed professor at Warsaw University by the President of Poland in 2001.

== Professional activities ==
From 1961, Rotfeld worked as a researcher at the Polish Institute of International Affairs (PISM, the acronym formed from the Polish name). He was a member of the UN Secretary General Advisory Board on Disarmament Matters from 2006 to 2011, and its chair in 2008; member of the NATO Expert Group on the New Strategic Concept of Alliance (2009–2010), and since 2010 Commissioner of the Euro-Atlantic Security Commission, member of the European Council on Foreign Relations (ECFR).

After 1989, he has served as leader of the Project on Building a Co–operative Security System in and for Europe at the Stockholm International Peace Research Institute (SIPRI). He was appointed as Director of SIPRI from 1 July 1991 and re–elected in 1996 for a second term, lasting until June 2002. He is a member of many consultative bodies and scientific councils, including the Institute of Political Studies at the Polish Academy of Sciences. He is co-chairman of Polish-Russian Group on Difficult Matters.

He has participated in many multilateral negotiations and conferences on security and arms control.

== Publications ==
Rotfeld has published and edited more than 20 monographs and over 400 articles. His work initially focused on the legal and political aspect of relations between Germany and Central and East European states after World War II (recognition of borders, the Munich Agreement and the right of self-determination) and multilateral process of security and cooperation in Europe initiated by the Helsinki Accords, as well as arms control and non-proliferation.

After the end of the cold war he co-edited the volume Germany and Europe in Transition (OUP 1991) with Walther Stützle. Since then his publications have mainly focused on human rights, cooperative security, CSBMs, multilateral security structures (NATO, EU, Organization for Security and Co-operation in Europe (OSCE)) and the political and legal structures of the security system in Europe.

He was editor of the SIPRI Yearbook: Armaments, Disarmament and International Security from 1991 to 2002. He has written more than 20 chapters on global and regional security systems and European and transatlantic security structures for the SIPRI Yearbook. He initiated the Warsaw Reflection Group (2004) and chaired the series of reports on the UN reform, multilateral European security institutions and on arms control, non-proliferation and denuclearization.

== Appointments ==
In his capacity as Director of SIPRI, he was appointed in 1992 as Personal Representative of the OSCE Chairman-in-Office to elaborate the political settlement of the conflict in the Trans–Dniester region of Moldova; the recommended basic principles for the political solution of the conflict in his report were approved by the OSCE Council of Ministers and conflicting parties.

Since 2001, he has been a member of the President of Poland's National Security Council.

He became Undersecretary of State at the Ministry of Foreign Affairs (MFA, Warsaw) in November 2001; in June 2003 he was appointed Secretary of State and served as Minister of Foreign Affairs between January 2005 and November 2005.

Since 2006, he has been a member of the UN Secretary-General's Advisory Board on Disarmament Matters (chaired 2008).

Since 2008, former Foreign Minister Rotfeld has been Co-Chairing the Polish-Russian Group For Difficult Issues, in particular the Katyn massacre, together with Rector of the Moscow State Institute of International Relations (University), Anatoly V. Torkunov.

== Memberships ==
He is a member of different academies and boards: the Royal Swedish Academy of War Sciences (appointed in 1996); the Governing Board of the Hamburg Institute for Peace Research and Security Policy at the University of Hamburg (IFSH, appointed in 1995); the Advisory Board of Geneva Centre for the Democratic Control of Armed Forces (DCAF, appointed in 2001); Geneva Security Policy Centre (2003), and many other research centres. He has been a member of the European Council on Foreign Relations since 2009.

Since March 2011, he has been professor at the Warsaw University Institute of Interdisciplinary Research (Collegium Artes Liberales). He has lectured at many universities and academic institutions in Europe, the United States, Russia, China and Japan.

As former Polish minister for integration, in 2012 signed the Soros' open letter calling for more Europe in the single currency turmoil.

He serves as a member of the OSCE's Panel of Eminent Persons.

== Awards and honours ==
Grand Cross of the Order of Polonia Restituta – 2010

The Commander's Cross of the Order of Polonia Restituta – 2005

Bene Merito Honorary Badge – 2009

Polish-Ukrainian Reconciliation Award – 2007

Honorary Doctorate in National Defense, University of Warsaw – 2013
