= Myyrä =

Finnish reality television show

- Genre: Reality; Game show
- Presented by: Roope Salminen
- Country of origin: Finland
- Original language: Finnish
- No. of seasons: 3
- No. of episodes: 30

Original release
- Network: MTV3
- Release: January 1, 2019 – present

Related
- The Mole; The Mole (Australia); The Mole (U.S.); The Mole (UK)

Myyrä (English: The Mole) is a Finnish reality television show based on a Belgian reality show De Mol. The show is hosted by Roope Salminen, and first aired in 2019 on MTV3.

== Format ==
The format is very much same as on the original version:

Each episode contestants (VIPs or NIPs) complete tasks, where can be earned or lost money and secret Immunity or Joker- symbols. These tasks can be either group or personal tasks. However, there's one person, who's trying to sabotage these tasks, and trying to keep the winning pot small as possible. One of the group is holding the money on the wallet and make sure, that they are safe. After all the tasks of the day are done, the voting starts: each player will answer to 20 questions based on the tasks of the day, of just to the mole itself. When all of the contestants have voted, the right answers are counted, and the person, whoe gets less correct answers. will be eliminated. If contestant have founded an Immunity or Joker- symbol during the tasks, he/she can use it on the voting. Immunity means that the contestant has not to complete the quiz. Joker means, that one of the contestants' wrong answer is turned to right answer.

In the final episode, one of the contestants wins the sum that the whole team was able to get previously, and one is revealed as The Mole, who goes home empty handed.

== Season overview ==
Season	First aired	Last aired	Host	The Mole	Winner	Runner-up	Amount won	Location
1	1 January 2019	2 March 2019	Roope Salminen	Tuija Pohjola	Olli Oksa	Pietari Oksa	€26,130	Mexico
2	2 March 2021	4 May 2021	Roope Salminen	Pyhimys	Aino Sirje	Teemu Packalen	€21,340	Latvia
3	2 April 2022	12 June 2022	Roope Salminen	Pete Lattu	Olli Herman	Miska Haakana	€22,435	Portugal
4	11 September 2024	13 November 2024	Roope Salminen	Ina Mikkola	Tomas Grekov	Kari Kanala	€25,130	Estonia

== Contestants ==
=== Season 1 ===
Contestant	Age	Residence	Occupation	Game Status
Eerika Väisänen	31	Pori	Social Services Supervisor	1st Eliminated
Joonas Kiili	30	Jyväskylä	Paramedic	2nd Eliminated
Matias Savo	24	Tampere	Student	3rd Eliminated
Irene Taurinen	43	Helsinki	Prompter	4th Eliminated
Pentti	65	Ingå	Pensioner	5th Eliminated
Juho Tanska	38	Porvoo	Restaurateur	6th Eliminated
Katriina Adele	29	Helsinki	Stewardess	7th Eliminated
Lotta Bernitz	22	Turku	Practical Nurse	8th Eliminated
Pietari Oksa	30	Helsinki	Project Assistant	9th Eliminated
Tuija Pohjola	29	Espoo	Psychologist	The Mole
Olli Oksa	51	Vantaa	Key Account Manager	Winner

=== Season 2 ===
In this Season, contestants are celebrities.

Contestant	Age	Residence	Occupation	Game Status
Wallu Valpio	47	Jyväskylä	Media Personality	1st Eliminated
Mira Luoti	42	Helsinki	Singer	2nd Eliminated
Noora Karma	45	Sipoo	Magician	3rd Eliminated
Mikko Penttilä	34	Helsinki	Actor	4th Eliminated
Pippa Laukka	51	Helsinki	Sports Doctor	5th Eliminated
Ilari Johansson	52	Helsinki	Comedian	6th Eliminated
Joona Puhakka	23	Helsinki	YouTuber	7th Eliminated
Teemu Packalen	33	Helsinki	Mixed Martial Artist	8th Eliminated / 2nd Place
Pyhimys	39	Helsinki	Rapper	The Mole
Aino Sirje	33	Barcelona, Spain	Actor	Winner

=== Season 3 ===
In this season also, there are celebrities.

Contestant	Age	Occupation	Game Status
Veeti Kallio	56	Actor, Musician	1st Eliminated
Ilona Ylikorpi	23	YouTubeur	2nd Eliminated
Markus Pöyhönen	43	Sprinter, Business Coach	3rd Eliminated
Dan Tolppanen	40	Musician	4th Eliminated
Pia Penttala	51	Psychotherapist	5th Eliminated
Ilona Chevakova	35	Actress	6th Eliminated
Sabina Särkkä	33	Model	7th Eliminated
Miska Haakana	25	YouTubeur, Musician	8th Eliminated / 2nd Place
Pete Lattu	42	Actor	The Mole
Olli Herman	38	Musician	Winner
