= Film (Polish magazine) =

Monthly Polish magazine devoted to cinema

- Frequency: Monthly (since September 1993)
- Publisher: Platforma Mediowa Point Group
- First issue: 1 August 1946; 79 years ago
- Country: Poland
- Based in: Warsaw
- Language: Polish
- Website: www.film.com.pl
- ISSN: 0137-463X

Film is a monthly Polish magazine devoted to cinema. It has been in publication since 1946, originally as a bimonthly publication. The founders were Jerzy Giżycki, Zbigniew Pitera, Tadeusz Kowalski and Leon Bukowiecki.

Since September 2012, the editor-in-chief has been Tomasz Raczek. Previous editors have included Maciej Pawlicki, Lech Kurpiewski, Igor Zalewski and Robert Mazurek, Agnieszka Różycka, Marcin Prokop and Jacek Rakowiecki.

In January 2007, Film was purchased by Platforma Mediowa Point Group (PMPG).

== Editorial staff ==
- Editor-in-chief – Tomasz Raczek
- Assistant editor – Agnieszka Dajbor, Danuta Łosin
- Editorial secretary – Agnieszka Niemojewska
- Artistic director – Marek Trojanowski
- Graphics – Cezary Cichocki, Mariusz Trocewicz
- Photography – Dagmara Trocewicz
- Team – Elżbieta Ciapara, Agnieszka Koseska, Anita Zuchora, Bartosz Żurawiecki
