= Noora Karma =

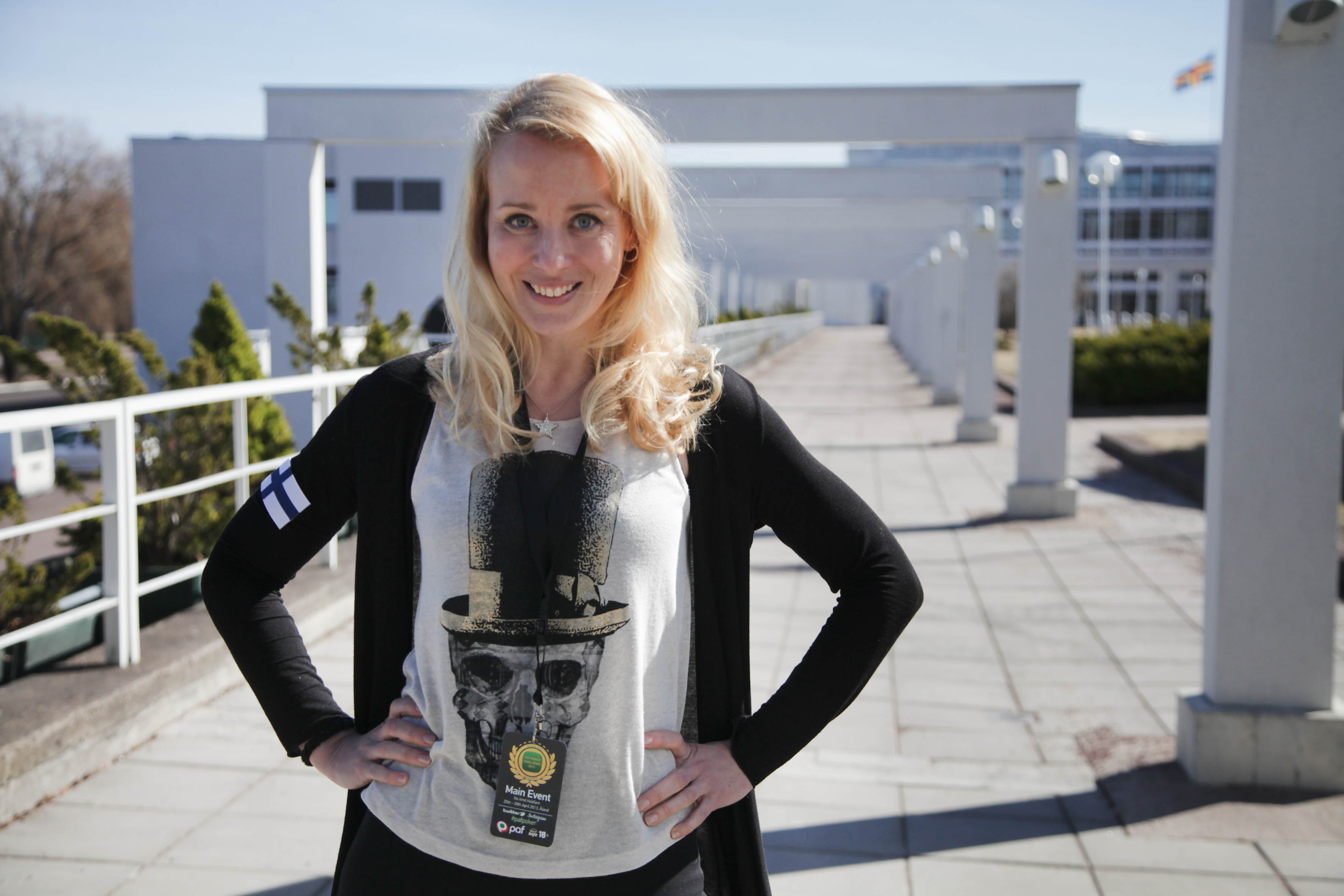
- Noora Karma in 2013
- Born: Noora Helena Karjula; September 19, 1975 (age 51); Vaasa, Finland
- Occupations: Magician, mentalist, singer, pianist, television host
- Years active: 2005–present
- Spouse: Jani Strömsholm (2017–2019)
- Partner: Alfonso Rios
- Children: 2

Noora Helena Karjula (née Strömsholm; born September 19, 1975), known professionally as Noora Karma, is a Finnish magician and mentalist. In March 2014, she starred in the TV show Mentalist Noora Karma on the MTV3 channel.

== Career ==
Karma became known in Finland for her magic tricks that received media attention. These include hypnotizing Ilkka Kanerva at the Independence Day celebrations after-party at the Presidential Palace, performing on Arto Nyberg's talk show, correctly predicting the outcomes of SM-liiga ice hockey games, and correctly guessing winning lottery numbers.

Karma primarily works as a magician, mentalist, and host at corporate and private events. She is also a singer and pianist, having earned a master's degree in music in London. She sang on the Remix band's single Vapauteen and writes her own music.

== Personal life ==
Karma has two children with Spanish magician Alfonso Rios. The couple won the Finnish Championship in stage magic in 2005. Prior to this, she was married to a British man. Karma was married to Jani Strömsholm from 2017 to 2019.

== Television ==
Karma participated in the Nelonen channel's reality TV series Selviytyjät Suomi in 2018. She took part in the second season of the TV series Myyrä, which aired in spring 2021. In spring 2024, Karma was a contestant on the show Tähdet, tähdet.
