= Rajmund Andrzejczak =

Polish general

General Rajmund Andrzejczak
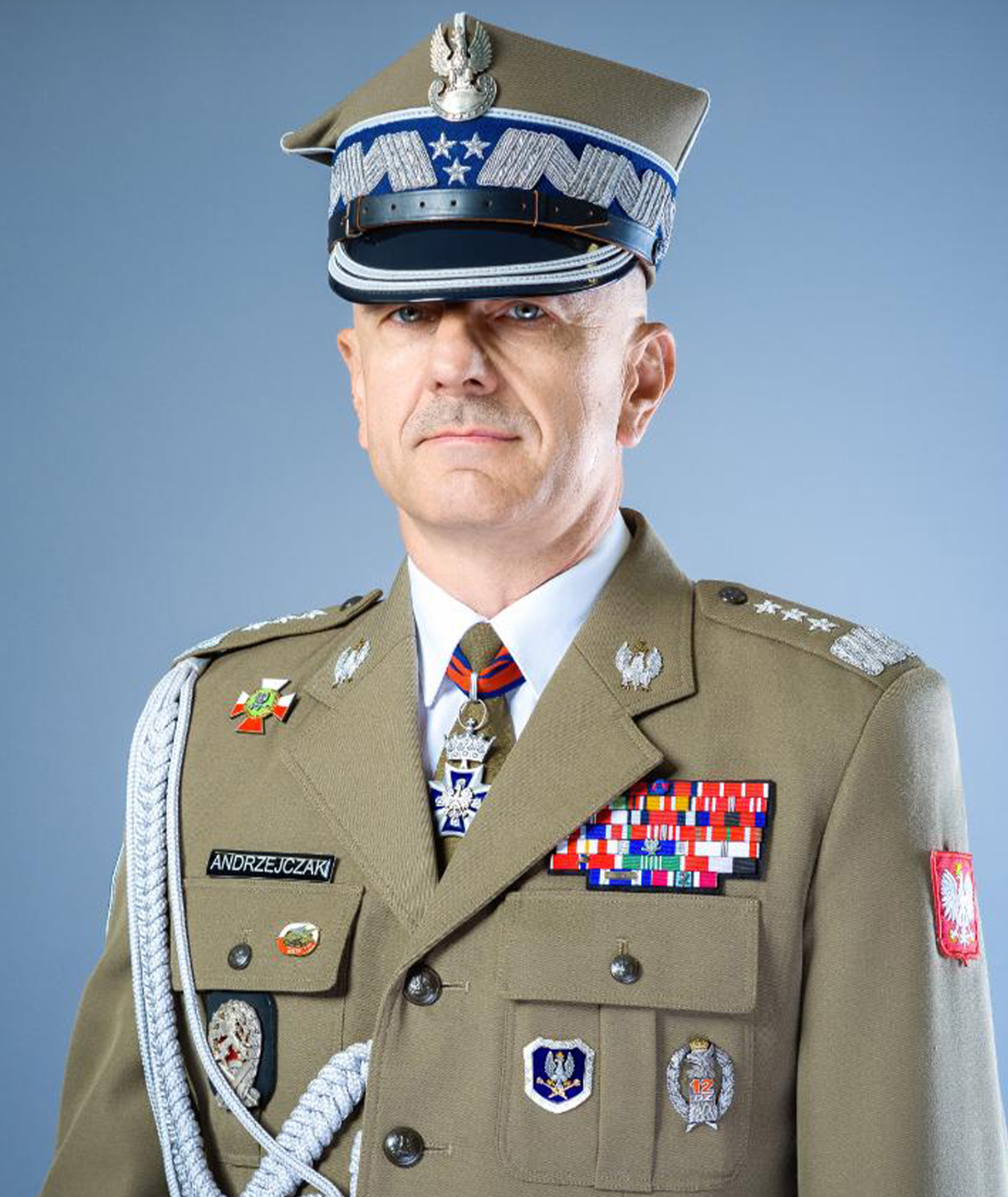
- Andrzejczak in 2019

Chief of the Polish General Staff
- In office 3 July 2018 – 10 October 2023
- Preceded by: Leszek Surawski
- Succeeded by: Wiesław Kukuła

Personal details
- Born: 29 December 1967 (age 58) Świdnica, Poland

Military service
- Allegiance: Poland
- Years of service: 1987–present
- Rank: General

Rajmund Tomasz Andrzejczak (born 29 December 1967) is a Polish general, serving as Chief of the General Staff of the Polish Armed Forces from 2018–2023.

== Life ==
=== Education ===
He is a graduate of the Military Academy of the Armored Forces in Poznań (1991), the Defense Academy of the Czech Army in Brno, the National Defence University of Warsaw, and the Royal College of Defense Studies.

=== Military career ===
Promotions

- Podporucznik (1991)
- Lieutenant (1994)
- Captain (1995)
- Major (2000)
- Lieutenant Colonel (2004)
- Colonel (2008)
- Brigadier General (2011)
- Divisional General (2016)
- General of the Branch (2018)
- General (2019)

Andrzejczak began his military career as a platoon commander (2nd Infantry Regiment located in the city of Giżycko). Between 1993 and 1996 he served as a commander of a tank company within the 15th Mechanised Brigade. From 1996 till 1998 he served in 4th Armoured Cavalry Brigade. He also served as chief of staff (1998–1999) and as deputy commander (2001–2003) of the Lithuanian-Polish Peace Force Battalion (LITPOLBAT).

In the years 2003–2005 Andrzejczak was appointed to a command position within the 15th Mechanised Brigade (as commander of the 1st armoured battalion). His next position was deputy chief the G-3 Operations Branch of the Land Forces Command. During the next four years he took part in missions in Iraq and Afghanistan. Shortly after his return from foreign missions he was appointed as the deputy commander of the 34th Armoured Cavalry Brigade in Żagań (2008–2010). Subsequently, he was moved to Cracow to 2nd Mechanised Corps, where he took the position of an assistant to the chief of staff (2010–2012). In 2011 he was promoted to brigadier general. Next year he took the position of commander of the 17th Mechanised Brigade in Międzyrzecz. In 2016 he became the commander of 12th Mechanised Division. On the same year Andrzejczak was promoted to major general. On 2 July 2018, Andrzej Duda appointed him to the post of the chief of the general staff and promoted him to lieutenant general.

On 12 November 2019, Andrzejczak received nomination to the rank of general. On 25 June 2021 the Polish President appointed him for second term as Chief of staff of the Polish Armed Forces. On 10 October 2023, Andrzejczak resigned, which was accepted by the President of the Republic of Poland.

=== Media ===
Since 1 February 2024, he has been co-hosting the program "Ground Zero" with Sławomir Dębski on Kanał Zero.

== Promotions ==
- Podporucznik (Second lieutenant) - 1991
- Porucznik (First lieutenant) - 1994
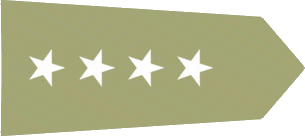
- Kapitan (Captain) - 1995
- Major (Major) - 2000
- Podpułkownik (Lieutenant colonel) - 2004
- Pułkownik (Colonel) - 2008
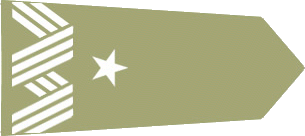
- Generał brygady (Brigadier general) - 9 August 2011
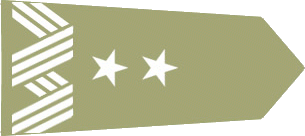
- Generał dywizji (Major general) - 15 August 2016
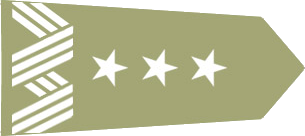
- Generał broni (Lieutenant general) - 3 July 2018
- Generał (General) - 7 November 2019

== Awards and decorations ==
- Officer's Cross of Order of Polonia Restituta (2021)
- Commander's Cross of Order of the Military Cross (2009)
- Military Cross of Merit (2016)
- Star of Iraq
- Star of Afghanistan
- Golden Medal of the Armed Forces in the Service of the Fatherland
- Silver Medal of the Armed Forces in the Service of the Fatherland
- Bronze Medal of the Armed Forces in the Service of the Fatherland
- Medal of the 100th Anniversary of the Establishment of the General Staff of the Polish Army (ex officio ,2018)
- Medal of Merit for the Police
- Badge "For Merit to the Association of Veterans of the Republic of Poland and Former Political Prisoners"
- Badge of Honour of the Association of War Invalids of the Republic of Poland (2013)
- Medal "Guardian of National Remembrance Sites"
- Silver Badge of Honour of the Polish Red Cross
- Multinational Division Central-South Commemorative Badge
- Medal of Honor for Services to the Military Police (2019)
- Bronze Star Medal, twice (USA, 2009)
- Army Commendation Medal
- Commander of Order of the Star of Romania (Romania, 2023)
- Commemorative Cross of the Chief of the General Staff of the Armed Forces of the Slovak Republic, 2nd Class (Slovakia, 2023)
- Medal UNDOF
- NATO Medal ISAF (2009)

== Gallery ==
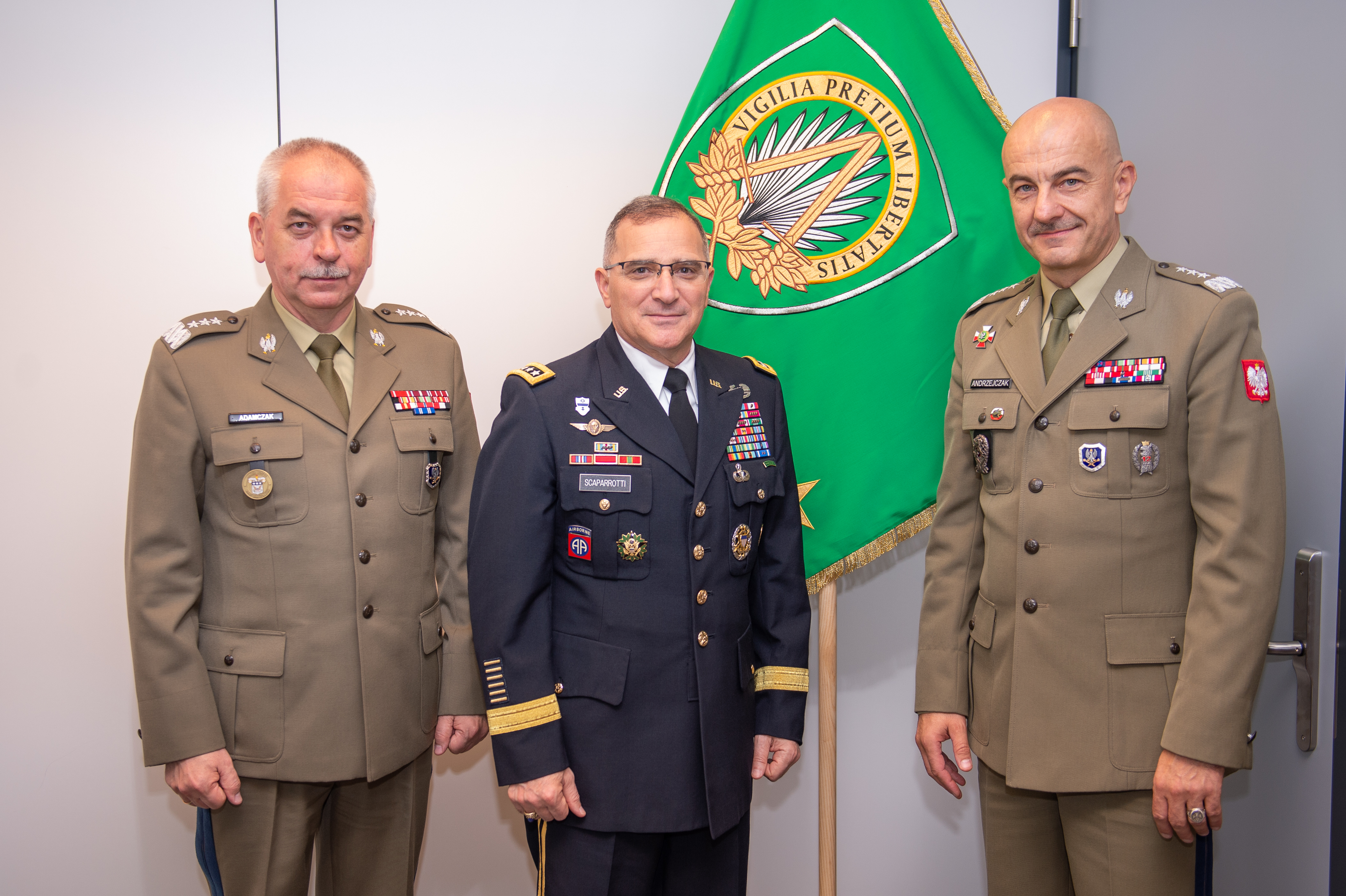
With gen. Janusz Adamczak and GEN Curtis Scaparrotti

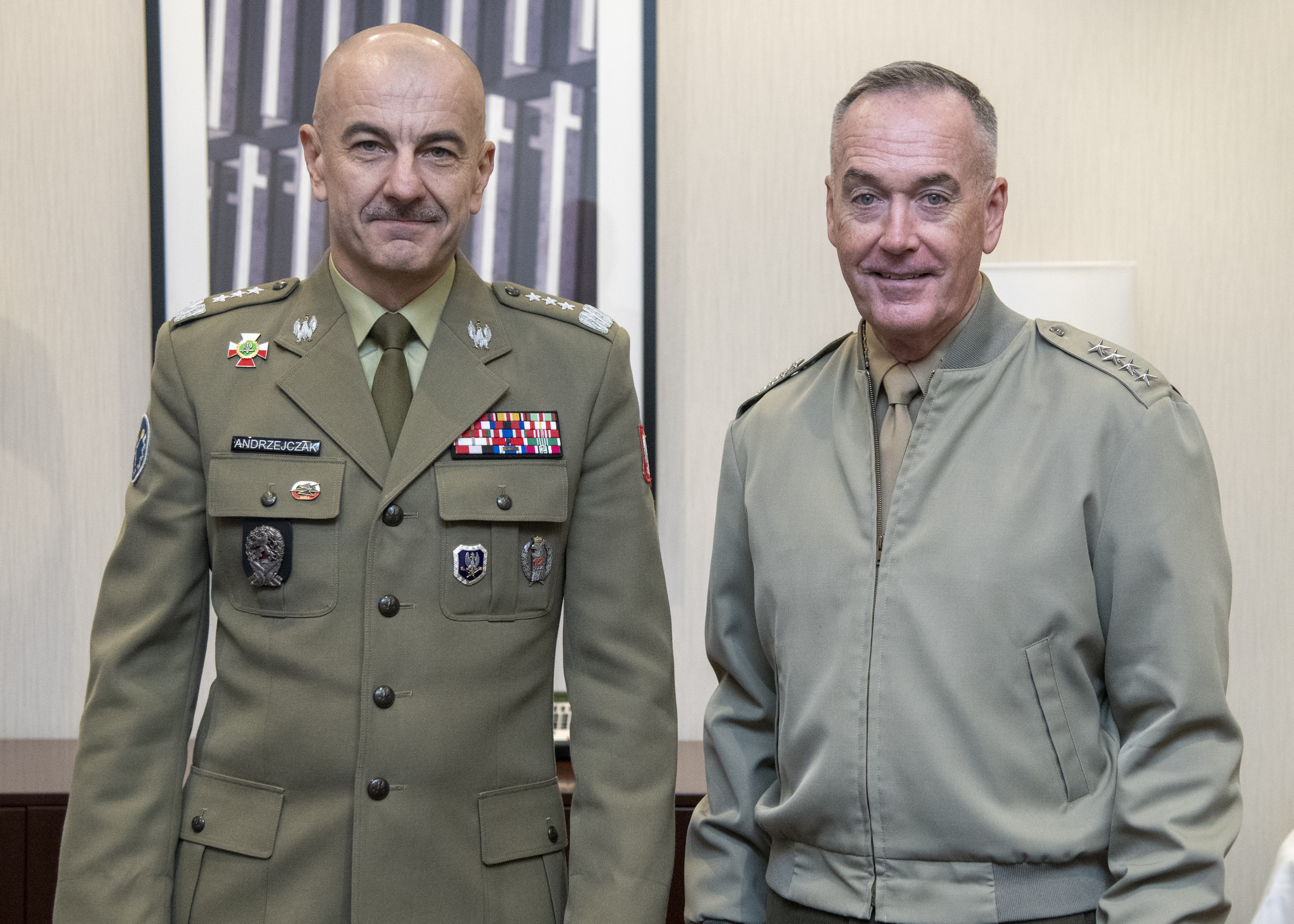
Rajmund Andrzejczak and Gen Joseph Dunford

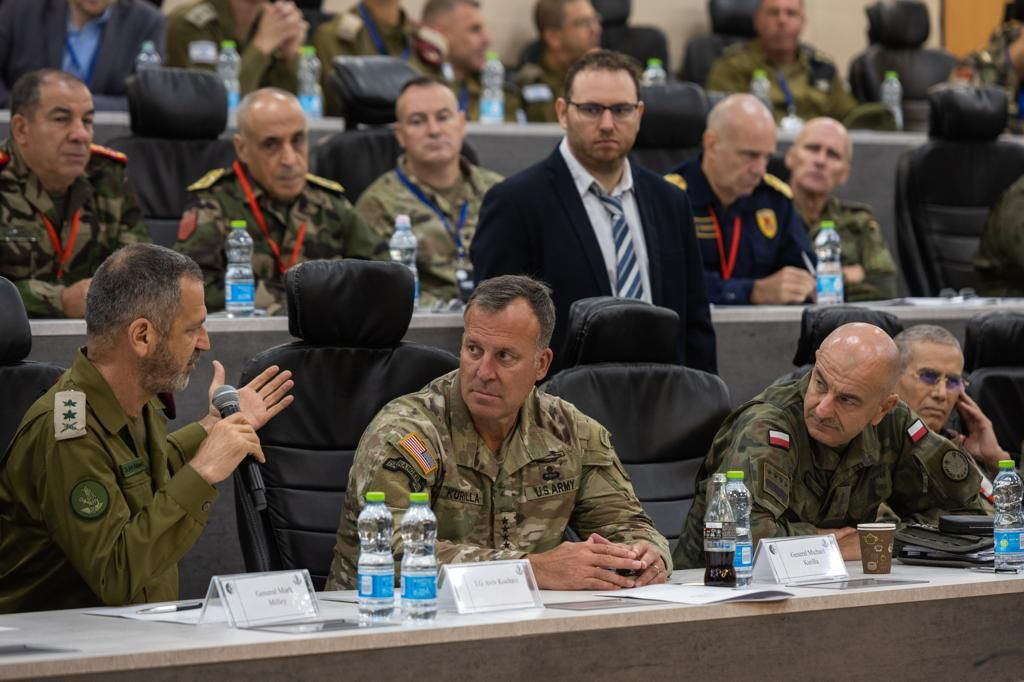
At Operational Innovation Conference, September 2022

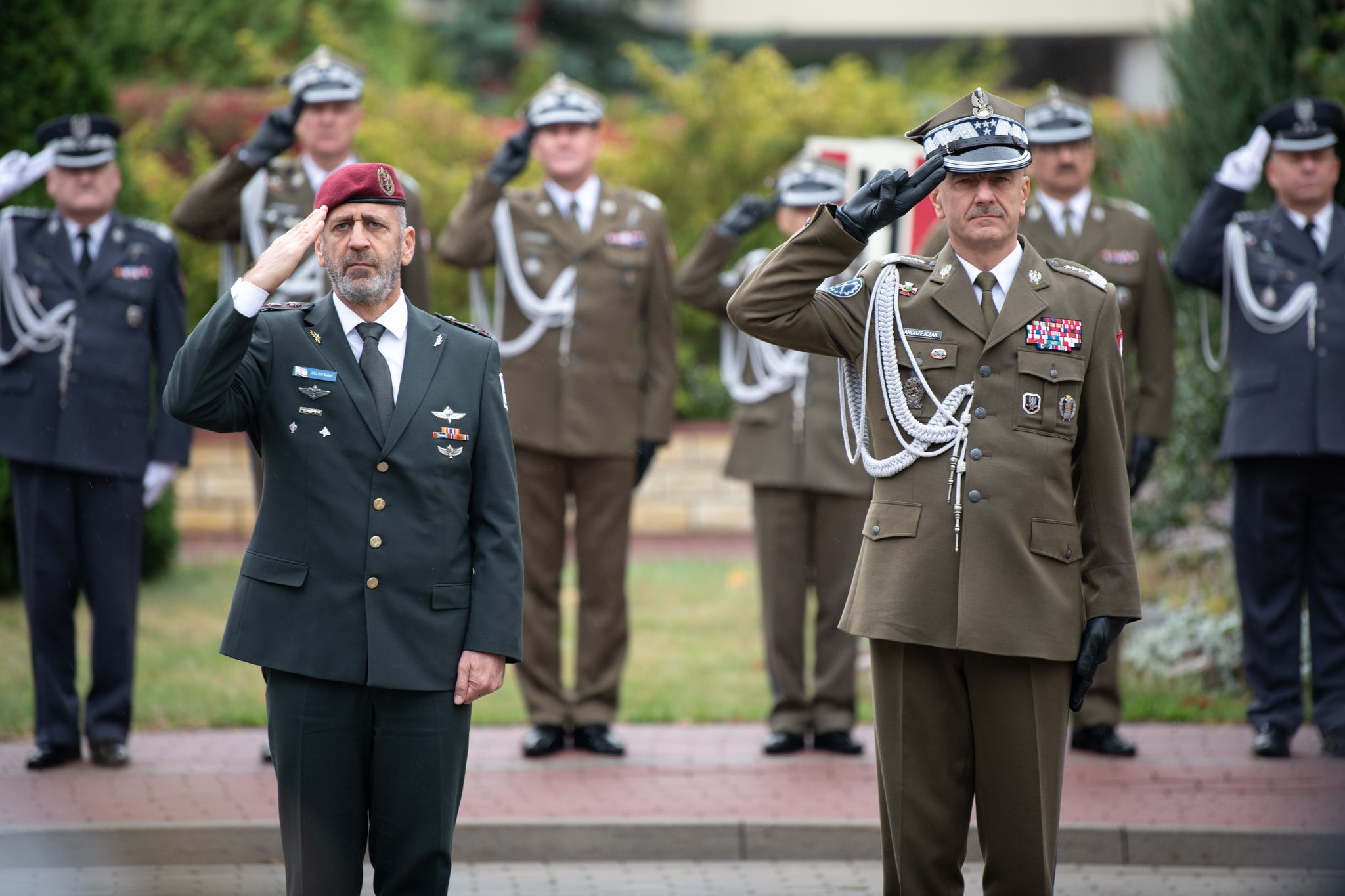
Rajmund Andrzejczak and Chief of General Staff of the Israel Defense Forces Aviv Kochavi during his visit to Poland, September 2022
