= Leszek Surawski =

Polish general

General Leszek Surawski
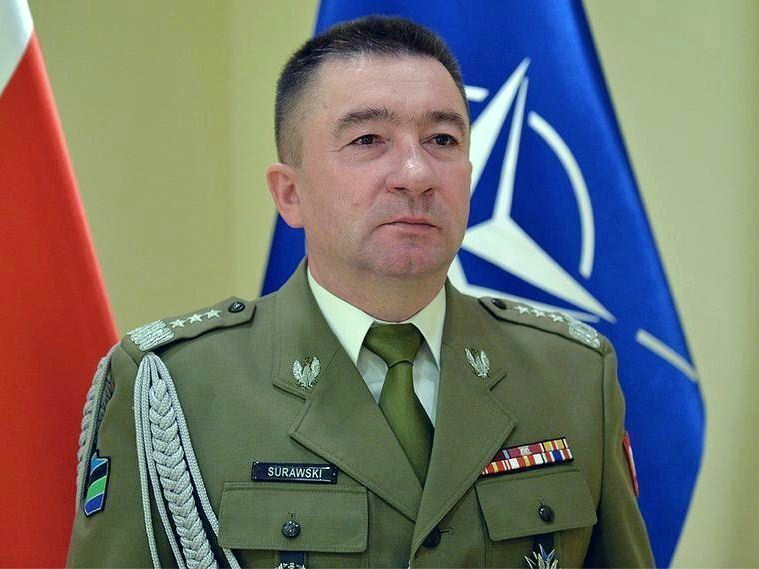

Chief of the Polish General Staff
- In office 31 January 2017 – 2 July 2018
- Preceded by: Mieczysław Gocuł
- Succeeded by: Rajmund Andrzejczak

Personal details
- Born: 18 July 1960 (age 65) Gołdap, Poland

Military service
- Allegiance: Poland
- Years of service: 1984–present
- Rank: Generał (General)
- Battles/wars: Iraq War

Leszek Surawski (born 18 July 1960) is a Polish general. From February 2017 to July 2018 he was Chief of the General Staff of the Polish Armed Forces.

== Life ==
=== Military career ===
Surawski entered the Officer School of the Polish Land Forces in Wrocław in 1980. After completing his education, he served from 1984 to 1990 in various posts in the 75th Mechanized Regiment in Bartoszyce. After two years of graduate study at the National Defence University in Warsaw, he spent 1992 to 1998 in the 1st Mechanized Division in Legionowo and the 9th Mechanized Brigade in Siedlce. In the course of this activity he was promoted to major in 1996. The following years brought more continuing education and various deployments as a field officer, including a foreign mission in Iraq as acting chief of staff of the Polish contingent.

In 2008 Surawski was promoted to brigadier general and appointed commander of the 20th Mechanized Brigade in Bartoszyce. Two years later he rose to the General Staff. There too he passed through various posts and in 2016 he was appointed first deputy of the Chief of the General Staff. When Mieczysław Gocuł departed at the beginning of 2017, Surawski succeeded him as Chief of the General Staff. The office was officially handed over on 31 January 2017. In March 2018 he was promoted to general. Only four months later, he handed over the leadership of the armed forces to Rajmund Andrzejczak on 2 July 2018.

=== Private life ===
Leszek Surawski is married. He and his wife have three children. Besides his native language he is also fluent in English.

== Promotions ==
- Podporucznik (Second lieutenant) - 1984
- Porucznik (First lieutenant) - 1987
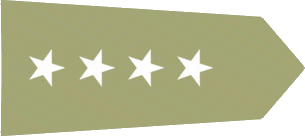
- Kapitan (Captain) - 1991
- Major (Major) - 1996
- Podpułkownik (Lieutenant colonel) - 2000
- Pułkownik (Colonel) - 2004
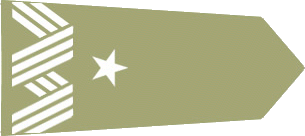
- Generał brygady (Brigadier general) - 8 November 2008
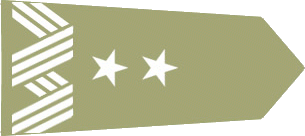
- Generał dywizji (Major general) - 1 August 2012
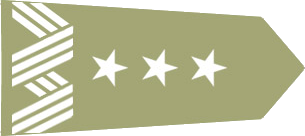
- Generał broni (Lieutenant general) - 15 August 2016
- Generał (General) - 22 February 2018

== Awards and decorations ==
- Commander's Cross of the Order of Polonia Restituta (2018)
- Officer's Cross of the Order of Polonia Restituta (2017)
- Bronze Cross of Merit (2002)
- Star of Iraq
- Golden Medal of the Armed Forces in the Service of the Fatherland
- Golden Medal of Merit for National Defence
- Medal of the 100th Anniversary of the Establishment of the General Staff of the Polish Army (2017)
- Badge of Merit for Polish Society of War Veterans
- Multinational Division Central-South Commemorative Badge
- Medal of Blessed Father Jerzy Popiełuszko
- Pro Patria Medal (2017)
