= Mieczysław Gocuł =

Polish general and former Chief of General Staff of the Polish army

General Mieczysław Gocuł
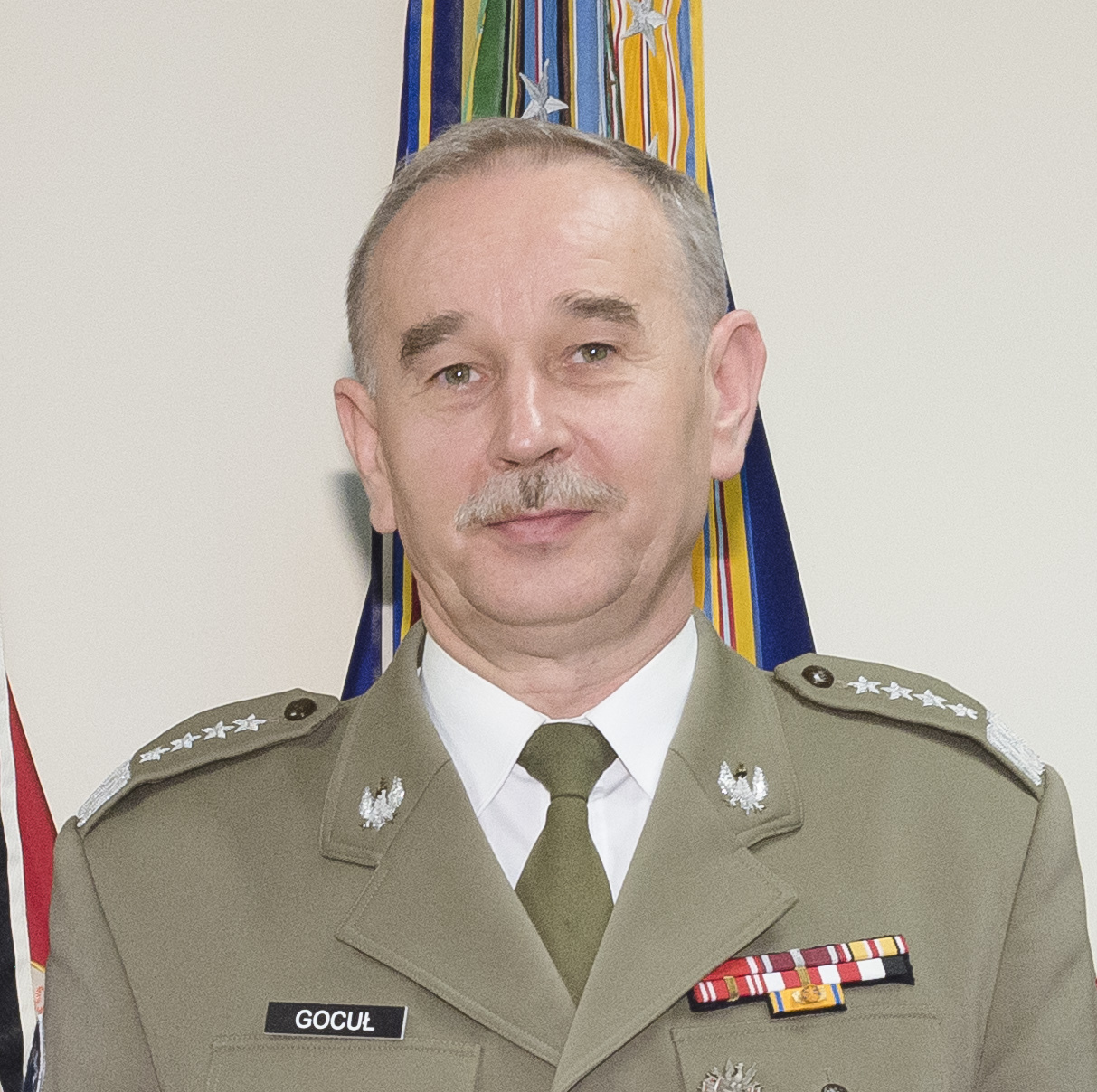

Chief of the Polish General Staff
- In office May 7, 2013 – January 31, 2017
- Preceded by: Mieczysław Cieniuch
- Succeeded by: Leszek Surawski

Personal details
- Born: 21 May 1963 (age 63) Choszczno, Poland
- Awards: See below

Military service
- Allegiance: Poland
- Years of service: 1983-present
- Rank: Generał (General)
- Battles/wars: Iraq War

Mieczysław Gocuł (born 21 May 1963) is a Polish General who served as Chief of General Staff of the Polish Armed Forces from May 7, 2013 until January 31, 2017.

== Biography ==
In the years 1983-1987 he was a cadet at the Stefan Czarniecki Armoured Forces Academy in Poznań. After graduating in 1987, he was appointed to his first service position as a tank platoon commander in the 9th Mechanised Regiment of the 12th Mechanised Division, and then to the position of commander of a training tank platoon and commander of a training tank company. In 1994, he was sent to study at the National Defense Academy. After completing his studies in 1996 at the National Defense University he was appointed commander of a tank battalion in the 12th Mechanized Brigade, 12th Armored Cavalry Brigade, and then to the position of commander of a tank battalion in the 6th Armored Cavalry Brigade, 12th Armored Cavalry Brigade. In 1999, after graduating from the Land Force Command and Staff College in Canada, he was appointed head of the Training Division in this unit. In 2001–2003 he served as head of the Operations Department and head of the Operations Department of the 1st Mechanized Corps Command. In 2003 he served as head of the Operations Department of the Multinational Division Central-South Staff. In 2005 he was sent to the Postgraduate Operational and Strategic Studies at the Royal Academy of Defense Studies in Great Britain. After completing his studies, he remained in the reserve personnel of the Minister of National Defense until the end of 2006.

In January 2007, he was appointed to the position of deputy head of the Operational Planning Directorate of the General Staff of the Polish Army On 27 June 2007 he became the head of the Intelligence and Reconnaissance Analysis Directorate of the General Staff of the Polish Army. In 2007, the President of the Republic of Poland Lech Kaczyński promoted him to the rank of brigadier general. From 15 July 2008, he was acting head of the Strategic Planning Directorate of the General Staff of the Polish Army. In 2009, the President of the Republic of Poland Lech Kaczyński promoted him to the rank of division general. On October 1, 2010, he became the First Deputy Chief of the General Staff of the Polish Army. In 2011, the President of the Republic of Poland Bronisław Komorowski promoted him to the rank of lieutenant general. On April 23, 2013, President of the Republic of Poland Bronisław Komorowski appointed him as Chief of the General Staff of the Polish Armed Forces, effective May 7, 2013. On July 30, 2014, President of the Republic of Poland Bronisław Komorowski promoted him to the rank of general. He received the act of appointment on August 15, 2014. On April 29, 2016, President of the Republic of Poland Andrzej Duda appointed General Mieczysław Gocuł as of May 7, 2016 for a second term as Chief of the General Staff of the Polish Armed Forces. In 2016, after completing his third-cycle studies at the Faculty of Management and Command of National Defence University of Warsaw, he defended his doctoral dissertation entitled: "The impact of operational capabilities management on the development of the Polish Armed Forces." On January 31, 2017, he ended his professional military service and retired. In January 2024, he became an advisor to the Minister of National Defense Władysław Kosiniak-Kamysz and the head of the team analyzing the activities of the Ministry of National Defense in the years 2015-2023. On 4 March 2024, he took up the duties of rector of the War Studies Academy.

== Medals and decorations ==
- Knight's Cross of the Order of Polonia Restituta (2012)
- Silver Cross of Merit (2003)
- Star of Iraq
- Golden Medal of the Armed Forces in the Service of the Fatherland (2014)
- Golden Medal of Merit for National Defence
- Multinational Division Central-South Commemorative Badge
- Order of the Cross of the Eagle, 1st Class (Estonia, 2014)
- Commander of Legion of Merit (United States, 2015)
- Commander of Legion of Honour (France, 2016)

== Gallery ==
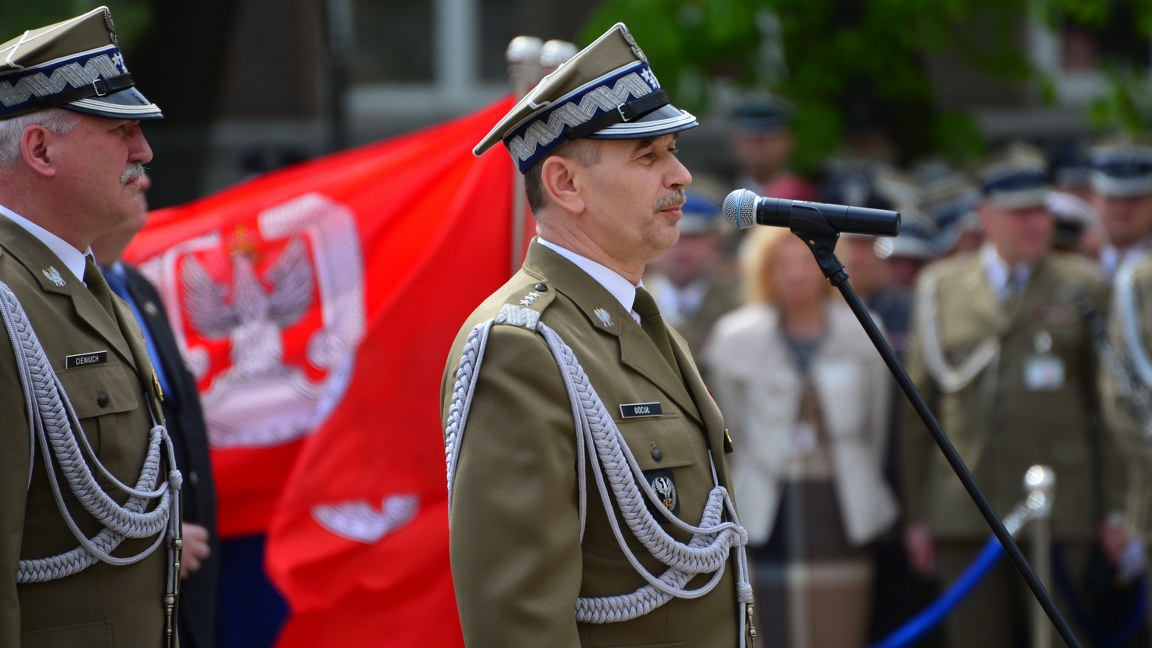
Nomination for the Chief of General Staff

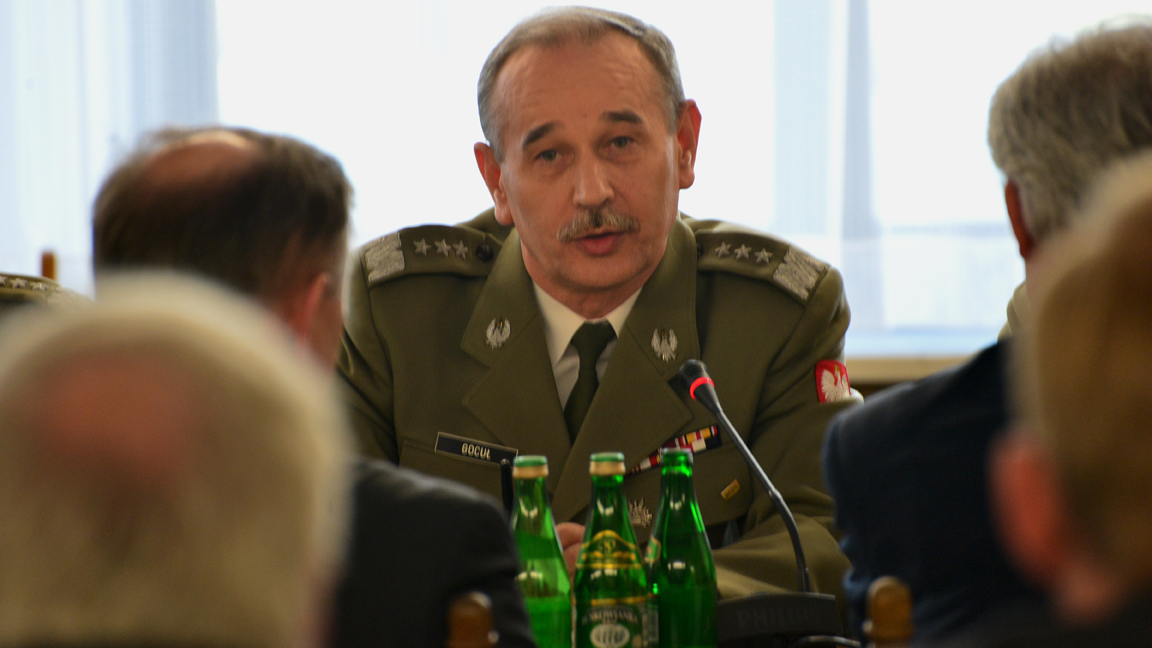
Gocuł in the Polish Sejm, May 2013

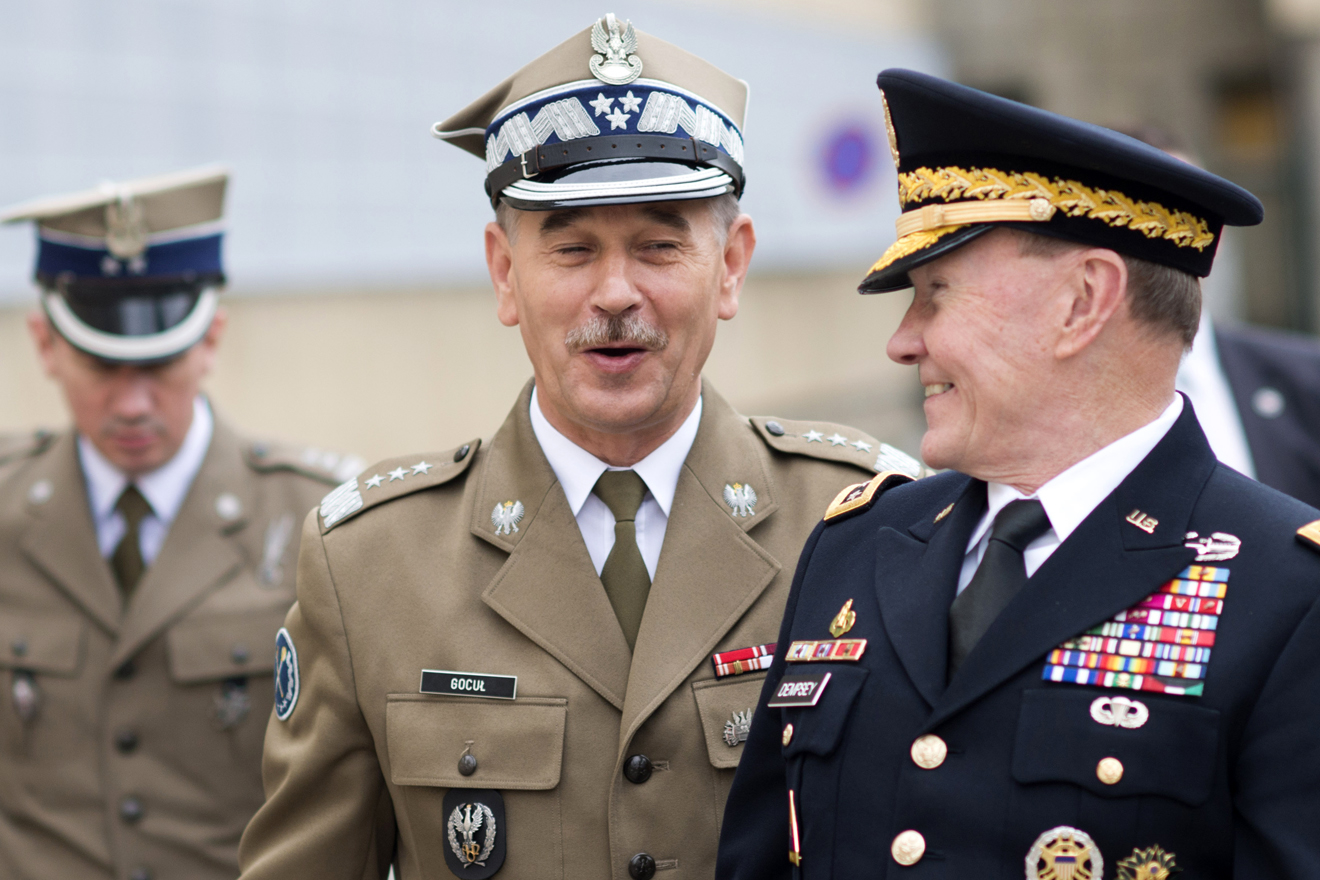
General Martin E. Dempsey with Gocuł in Warsaw, July 2013

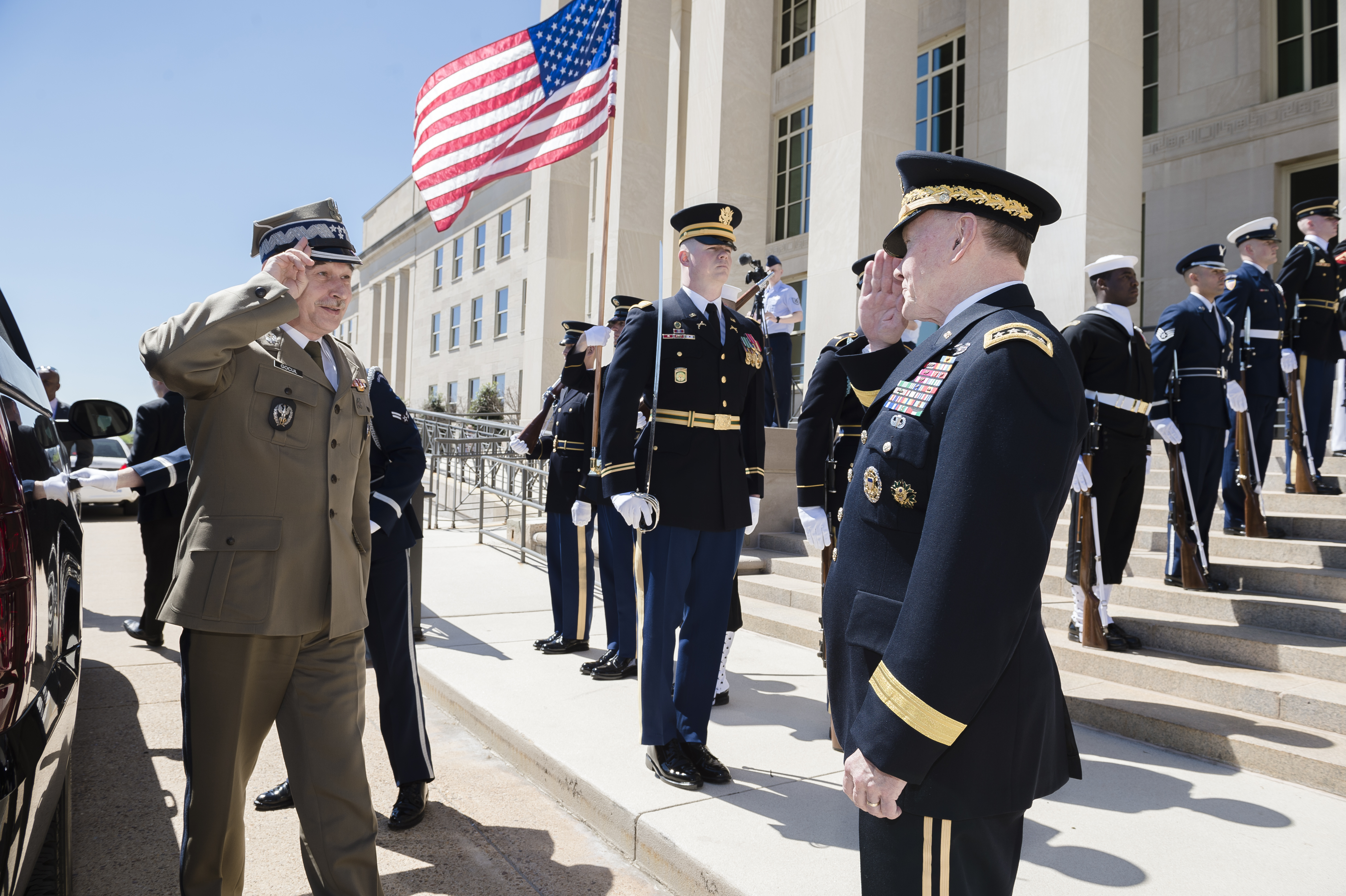
The Pentagon, April 2015
