= Stefan Meller =

Polish diplomat and academician

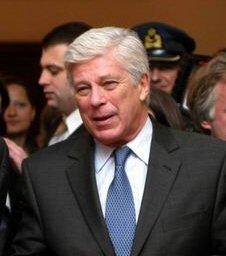

Minister of Foreign Affairs
- In office 31 October 2005 – 9 May 2006
- Prime Minister: Kazimierz Marcinkiewicz
- Preceded by: Adam Daniel Rotfeld
- Succeeded by: Anna Fotyga

Polish ambassador to France
- In office 4 September 1996 – 31 January 2001
- Appointed by: Aleksander Kwaśniewski
- Preceded by: Jerzy Łukaszewski
- Succeeded by: Sławomir Czarlewski

Personal details
- Born: 4 July 1942 Lyon, France
- Died: 4 February 2008 (aged 65) Warsaw, Poland
- Party: None
- Profession: Diplomat, Academician

Stefan Meller [ˈstɛfan ˈmɛllɛr] (4 July 1942 in Lyon, France – 4 February 2008 in Warsaw, Poland) was a Polish diplomat and academician. He served as foreign minister of Poland from 31 October 2005, to 9 May 2006, in the cabinet of Kazimierz Marcinkiewicz.

He was born to a Jewish family. Meller was a graduate from the faculty of history of the University of Warsaw. He was a Humanities professor until he was employed by the Polish Institute of International Affairs. He was also an editor-in-chief of a Polish monthly magazine "Mówią Wieki". From 1974 to 1992 he worked at the University of Warsaw and State Higher School of Drama and School of Social Sciences in Warsaw. He was previously the ambassador to France and Russia.

He resigned from the position of a minister after Law and Justice made coalition with Samoobrona, and Samoobrona's leader, Andrzej Lepper. Meller said "I am not going to be the clown at Andrzej I's court". One of his sons, Marcin Meller, was the editor-in-chief of the Polish edition of Playboy magazine.

== Awards and decorations ==
- Commander's Cross of Order of Polonia Restituta (1995)
- Commander of Legion of Honour
- Grand Officer of Ordre national du Mérite (France)
- Commander of Ordre des Palmes académiques (France, 1995)
