= Kanał Zero =

Polish online general-interest channel

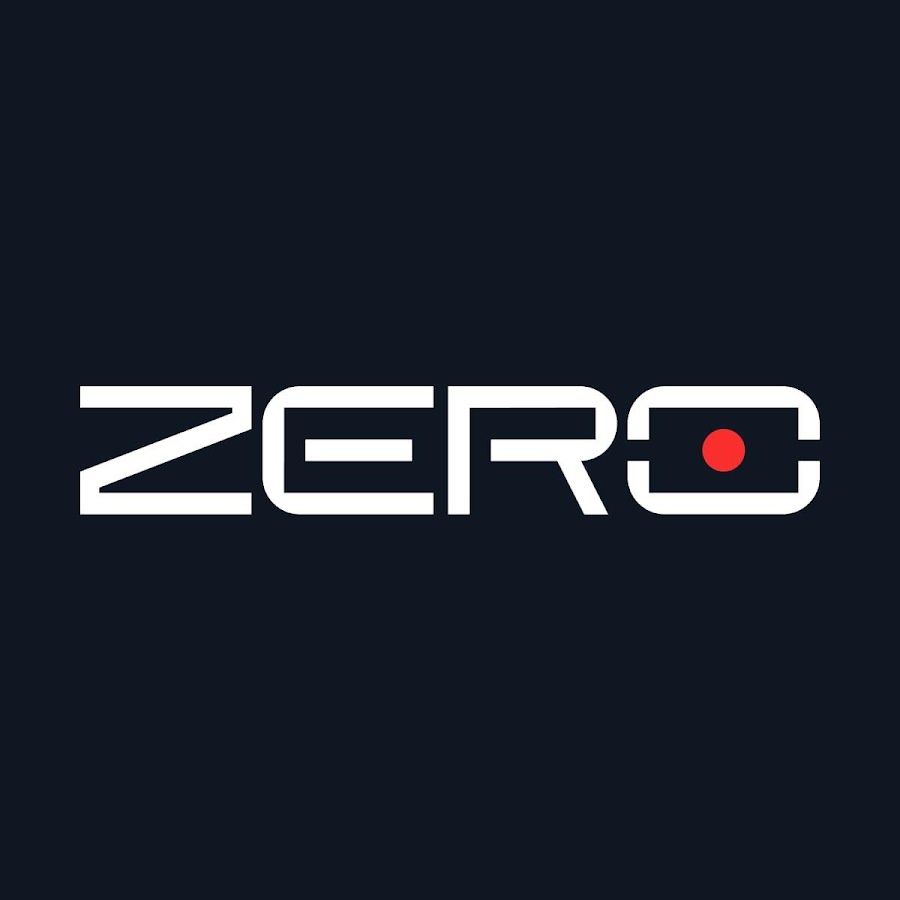
- Company type: Private
- Industry: Broadcasting (general-interest) satellite channel
- Founded: 24 October 2023; 2 years ago in Warsaw, Poland satellite license in 2025
- Founder: Krzysztof Stanowski
- Headquarters: Warsaw, Poland
- Area served: Worldwide; (mainly Poland)
- Key people: Arleta Bojke; Robert Mazurek; Tomasz Rożek; Marcin Matczak; Rajmund Andrzejczak; Marcin Meller; Tomasz Kammel
- Owner: Krzysztof Stanowski

Kanał Zero (Polish for "Channel Zero") is a Polish general-interest YouTube channel founded by Krzysztof Stanowski on 24 October 2023 and officially launched on 1 February 2024. On 8 October 2025, the National Broadcasting Council granted a satellite licence for the television channel Kanał Zero TV. The channel has garnered over 2 million subscribers and accumulated more than 939 million views of its uploaded content.

== History ==
The Kanał Zero was established on 24 October 2023 on YouTube. On 7 November 2023, Krzysztof Stanowski officially announced the project, and on 14 November 2023, the channel published its first video outlining its format.

Several well-known figures from Kanał Sportowy transitioned to Kanał Zero, including Robert Mazurek, Wojciech Kowalczyk, and Maciej Dąbrowski. In January 2024, it was revealed that the channel's team would include experts from diverse fields, such as physicist Tomasz Rożek, law professor Marcin Matczak, and general Rajmund Andrzejczak. Media personalities such as Marcin Meller (formerly with TVN) and Izabella Krzan (formerly with TVP) also joined the team.

The official launch took place on 1 February 2024 at 20:00, marked by a live broadcast hosted by Krzysztof Stanowski and Przemysław Rudzki. The next day, the channel premiered its flagship program, Godzina Zero (Zero Hour), featuring Polish president Andrzej Duda as the inaugural guest.

On 16 January 2025, Zero broadcast a live interview of Stanowski with Janusz Waluś, who assassinated Chris Hani. At least 770 complaints were sent to the National Broadcasting Council about the broadcast, and the NGO Basta notified prosecutors about a suspicion of "public incitement and appraise of violence, and racially motivated insults". Both cases were closed with no law violations found.

Before the 2025 Polish presidential election, Stanowski, a candidate himself, interviewed all other registered candidates in the Godzina Zero (Hour Zero) cycle (Stanowski was interviewed by Bogdan Rymanowski instead). Michał Piedziuk of Polityka Insight noted the low-confrontation style, combined with long, 2-3 hour length, allowing candidates to freely present themselves. The interview with Karol Nawrocki was also re-transmitted by TV Republika. Interview with Maciej Maciak ended after a few minutes, as Stanowski left the studio, later issuing a statement that "when it turned out today after the first 2 questions, that my guest wants to use my channel for spreading Russian propaganda, I did not intend to drag that out." Rafał Trzaskowski was interviewed in his own house, out of the usual Kanał studio, and co-broadcast it on his own YouTube channel.

After the first round of the election, Zero allowed both candidates in the run-off to publish one video a day on their channel until election silence. After the election, Zero allowed political parties with parliamentary representation to publish one video a week, under the condition that "leading figures" will appear. The list of parties notably excludes the Confederation of the Polish Crown, split from Confederation Liberty and Independence after the parliamentary election.

On October 8, 2025, the National Broadcasting Council granted a satellite license to the KANAŁ ZERO TV company for the distribution of a television program channel "Kanał Zero TV".

== Team ==
The following is a list of individuals associated with Kanał Zero along with their roles:

- Krzysztof Stanowski – Host
- Andrzej Borcz – Economics
- Andrzej Twarowski – Sports
- Wojciech Kowalczyk – Sports
- Przemysław Rudzki – Sports
- Dariusz Szpakowski – Sports
- Bogusław Leśnodorski – Law
- Marcin Matczak – Law
- Dariusz Dziektarz – Nature
- Izabella Krzan – Entertainment
- Jacek "Tede" Graniecki – Entertainment
- Maciej Dąbrowski – Entertainment
- Kacper Ruciński – Entertainment
- Czarek Sikora – Entertainment
- Marcin Meller – Entertainment
- Marcin "WuWunio" Sprusiński – Entertainment
- Jakub Kosikowski – Medicine
- Robert Gwiazdowski – Economy
- Robert Mazurek – Politics
- Jarosław Wolski – Military
- Rajmund Andrzejczak – Geopolitics, Military
- Sławomir Dębski – Geopolitics, Military
- Tomasz Rożek – Science
- Arleta Bojke – Global news, Journalism
- Maria Wiernikowska – War correspondence (Gaza war); Reportage
- Maria Stepan – Journalism
- Maciej Wilk – Journalism
- Łukasz Kaca – Human mind sciences
- Szczepan Twardoch – Journalism
- Dawid Chęć – Journalism
- Joanna Pinkwart – Journalism
- Jakub Dymek – Journalism
- Paulina Danielak – Psychology
- Tomasz Kammel – Celebrity and entertainment news
- Tomasz Wolny – Entertainment
- Łukasz Zboralski – Road safety topics

== See also ==
- Kanał Sportowy
- Weszło
