= Wirtualna Polska =

Polish media company

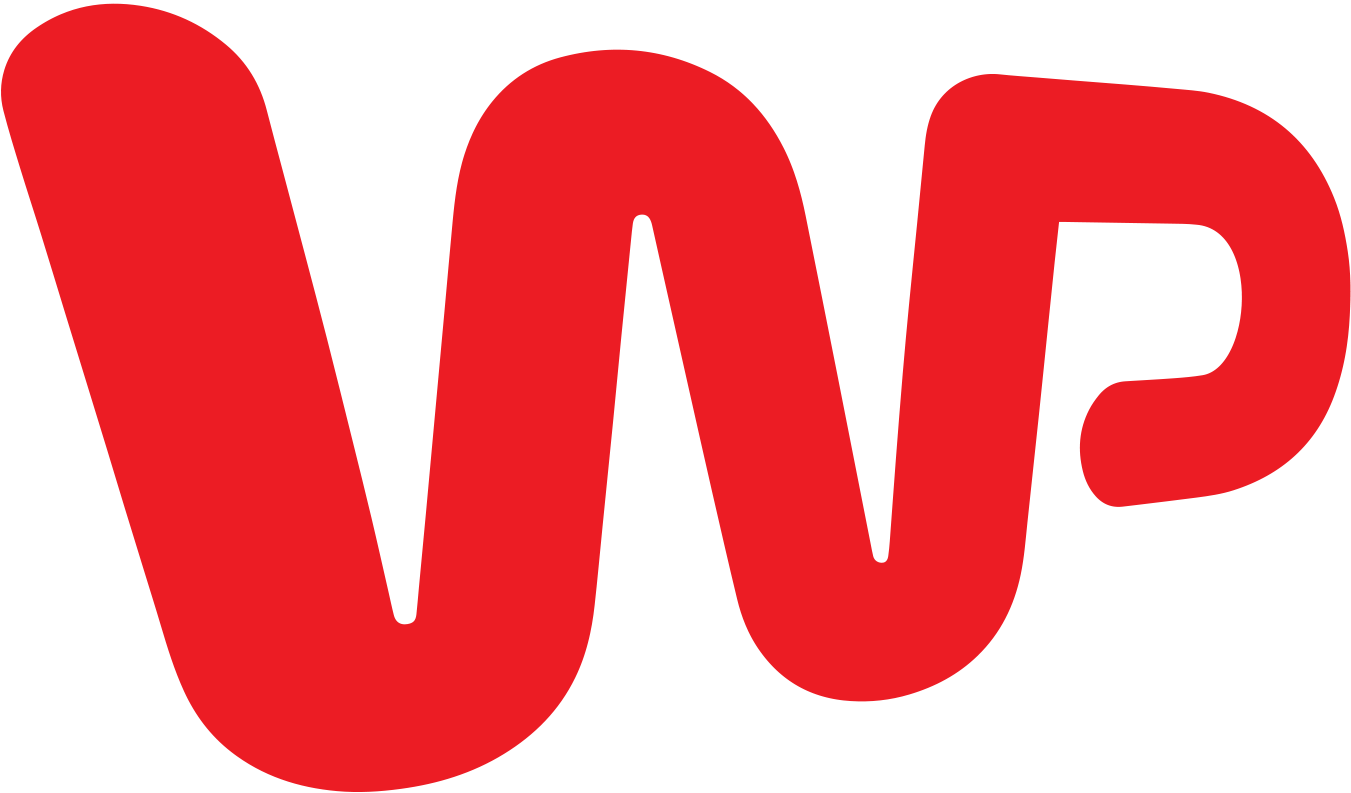
- The company's logo since 2014
- Industry: E-commerce and mass media
- Founded: 1995; 31 years ago in Gdańsk, Poland
- Founders: Marek Borzestowski and Leszek Bogdanowicz
- Headquarters: Gdańsk, Poland
- Owner: Grupa o2 (100% shareholder)
- Website: wp.pl

Wirtualna Polska (WP [vuˈpɛ]; lit. 'Virtual Poland') is a Polish company involved in many mass media and e-commerce enterprises.

== History ==
The two founders of the portal, Marek Borzestowski and Leszek Bogdanowicz, created it whilst in Germany in 1995. Initially named Wirtualna Akademia, it was a web directory. It was later renamed to Wirtualna Polska and soon gained a stable headquarters in Gdańsk. Borzestowski sold his shares to other investors in 2005, and the company has grown significantly since then; its e-mail service, Poczta WP, was established in November 1998 and has since become extremely popular.

== Ownership and structure ==
In 2014, Orange Polska sold all shares of Wirtualna Polska to Grupa o2, another mass media company, for 375 million zł. The purchase was funded by the private equity firm Innova Capital. From March 2018 to August 2024, Wirtualna Polska's owner was Joanna Pawlak. She was succeeded by Jacek Świderski, the owner of Wirtualna Polska's holding company.

On 16 November 2020, Marcin Meller became the editor-in-chief of Wirtualna Polska, a position left vacant by the departing Tomasz Machała after a scandal in February 2020. On 4 December, Meller also left the role and was replaced by Piotr Mieśnik. On 1 March 2023, he was in turn replaced by Paweł Kapusta.

== Controversies ==
In January 2020, the investigative journalism portal OKO.press published an article detailing the alleged collaboration of Wirtualna Polska with the Ministry of Justice, primarily by censoring material criticizing Zbigniew Ziobro and writing articles expressing support for the ministry under false surnames. The aforementioned editor-in-chief, Tomasz Machała, was forced to resign following an internal investigation. Machała then made several negative comments about Wirtualna Polska and stated that only 1% of its revenue came from advertising.
