= Roope Salminen =

Finnish media personality

- Born: Roope Aleksi Salminen; 11 December 1989 (age 36); Helsinki, Finland
- Occupations: Television host; actor; singer
- Years active: 2008-present

Roope Aleksi Salminen (born 11 December 1989) is a Finnish TV personality, singer and actor. He is known for being the vocalist for the music group Roope Salminen & Koirat and for hosting several TV shows, such as Enbuske, Veitola & Salminen, Putous and Myyrä on Finnish commercial channels. In 2016 he was awarded the title "Media Person of the Year in Finland".

Roope Salminen, son of Finnish actors Eppu Salminen and Minna Turunen, started his acting career in 2008 in the Finnish TV-series Kotikatu in the role of Jan-Erik Talvela. He acted the role until 2012. In 2010 he co-founded the hiphop ground Roope Salminen & Koirat and the group released its single, "Madafakin darra", in 2016, selling platinum in Finland. The group has released two albums, Madafakin levy in 2016 and Koiran vuosi in 2019.

Salminen has hosted Uuden Musiikin Kilpailu in 2015 and 2016, Koomikot and Hittikärpänen in 2015, his own Roope Salminen Show in 2016 and Enbuske, Veitola & Salminen talk show 2016–2018.

== Personal life ==
Salminen was in a relationship with former Miss Finland, Sara Sieppi, between 2015 and 2018. Their relationship received a lot of media attention in Finland. In April 2020 Salminen and Putous-actress Helmi-Leena Nummela had their first child, but Salminen and Nummela have since separated.

In 2020, Salminen was sentenced to 70-day fines for a coerced sexual act (Finnish pakottaminen seksuaaliseen tekoon). The next year he described himself as a recovering alcoholic.

Salminen was diagnosed with ADHD in 2024.
