= Marcin Meller =

Polish journalist (born 1968)

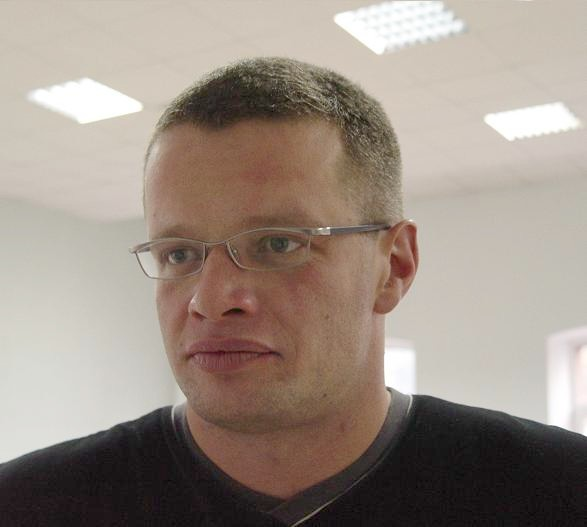
- Born: 23 October 1968 (age 57); Warsaw, Poland
- Occupations: Historian, journalist
- Years active: 1990s - present

Marcin Meller (born 23 October 1968) is a Polish journalist and former editor-in-chief of the Polish edition of Playboy magazine. Former member of the Independent Students' Union.

He was born on 23 October 1968 in Warsaw as a son of Polish diplomat and academician Stefan Meller. His grandfather, Adam Meller, was Polish-Jewish communist politician. Marcin Meller graduated in history at University of Warsaw in 1991, and then debuted as reporter in the Polityka magazine. At present, Meller is columnist in the Wprost magazine. He is also known for presenting in the TVN television. On 18 October 2024, he debuted his collaboration with Kanał Zero by hosting a live program titled Kolacja Mellera on Friday evenings.
