= Marek Piotrowicz =

Polish footballer

Personal information
- Date of birth: 20 November 1963 (age 62)
- Place of birth: Kossowa, Poland
- Height: 1.85 m (6 ft 1 in)
- Position: Defender

Senior career*
Years	Team	Apps	(Gls)
1982–1993	Górnik Zabrze	206	(1)
1993–1994	Stal Stalowa Wola	29	(1)
1994–1995	Górnik Zabrze	5	(0)
1995–1996	Sokół Tychy	24	(0)
1996–1998	Górnik Zabrze	49	(0)
Total		313	(2)

International career
- Poland U20

Managerial career
- 1998–2004: Górnik Zabrze (assistant)
- 2001: Górnik Zabrze (caretaker)
- 2001: Górnik Zabrze
- 2005: Koszarawa Zywiec
- 2005: Szczakowianka Jaworzno
- 2005–2006: Rozwój Katowice
- 2007: Górnik Zabrze (caretaker)
- 2007–2009: Górnik Zabrze II
- 2013–2016: Slavia Ruda Śląska
- 2016–2019: Górnik Zabrze (youth)
- 2019–2022: LKS Bełk
Medal record
Men's football
Representing Poland
FIFA World Youth Championship
Third place	1983 Mexico
- * Club domestic league appearances and goals

Marek Piotrowicz (born 20 November 1963) is a Polish football manager and former player who played as a defender.

== Honours ==
Górnik Zabrze

- Ekstraklasa: 1984–85, 1985–86, 1986–87, 1987–88
- Polish Super Cup: 1988

Poland U20

- FIFA World Youth Championship third place: 1983
