= Marek Motyka =

Polish footballer and coach

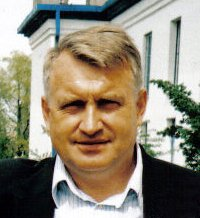

Personal information
- Date of birth: 17 April 1958 (age 68)
- Place of birth: Żywiec, Poland
- Height: 1.83 m (6 ft 0 in)
- Position: Defender

Youth career
- Soła Żywiec
- –1976: Koszarawa Żywiec

Senior career*
Years	Team	Apps	(Gls)
1976–1978	Hutnik Kraków		
1978–1989	Wisła Kraków	323	(17)
1990	Brann	8	(0)
1991	Hetman Zamość		
1991–1993	Cracovia		
1993–1996	Kalwarianka Kalwaria		
1996–1998	Garbarz Zembrzyce		
1999	Raba Dobczyce		

International career
1980	Poland	8	(0)

Managerial career
- 1993–1996: Kalwarianka Kalwaria (player-manager)
- 1996–1998: Garbarz Zembrzyce (player-manager)
- 1998–1999: Wawel Kraków
- 1999: Raba Dobczyce (player-manager)
- 1999: Hutnik Kraków
- 2000: BKS Bochnia
- 2000–2002: Wisła Kraków II
- 2002–2003: Szczakowianka Jaworzno
- 2003–2004: Tłoki Gorzyce
- 2004–2005: Polonia Warsaw
- 2005: Górnik Zabrze
- 2006: Górnik Zabrze
- 2007: Górnik Zabrze
- 2008–2009: Polonia Bytom
- 2009: Korona Kielce
- 2010–2011: Kolejarz Stróże
- 2012–2013: Garbarnia Kraków
- 2015: Limanovia Limanowa
- 2015: Rozwój Katowice
- 2016: Concordia Knurów
- 2017: Hetman Zamość
- 2021–2022: LKS Śledziejowice
- 2023: Sparta Kazimierza Wielka
- 2025: Piaskowianka Piaski
- * Club domestic league appearances and goals

Marek Motyka (born 17 April 1958) is a Polish football manager and former player, most recently in charge of Piaskowianka Piaski.

== Playing career ==
=== Club ===
Marek Motyka began his career with two hometown clubs: Soła and Koszarawa Żywiec. Later he played for Hutnik Kraków, and in the beginning of 1978 he moved to Wisła Kraków. In 1990, Motyka played for the Norwegian club SK Brann. He eventually returned to Poland to play for Hetman Zamość, Cracovia, Kalwarianka Kalwaria Zebrzydowska, Garbarz Zembrzyce and Raba Dobczyce. Motyka played in 224 matches and scored six goals in the Ekstraklasa.

=== International ===
Motyka represented Poland on eight different occasions.

== Coaching career ==
Motyka began his coaching career at Kalwarianka Kalwaria Zebrzydowska, where he served as the player-manager. He managed Szczakowianka Jaworzno from 21 May 2002 to 22 May 2003. He managed Tłoki Gorzyce after his time in Jaworzno. On 1 July 2004, Polonia Warsaw hired Motyka with the goal of avoiding degradation. On 15 July 2005, he was replaced by Dariusz Kubicki. On 4 November 2005, Motyka joined Górnik Zabrze and managed to save the team from relegation to II liga. Between January and April 2006, he was temporarily replaced by Ryszard Komornicki, but returned soon after. On 12 December 2006, he was released by Górnik. Zdzisław Podedworny soon took the position at Górnik. He was hired once again in March 2007. On 9 July 2008, Motyka was appointed as manager of Polonia Bytom. In 2009, he joined Korona Kielce.

== Honours ==
=== Player ===
Wisła Kraków

- Ekstraklasa: 1977–78
