= Jan Urban =

Polish football manager (born 1962)

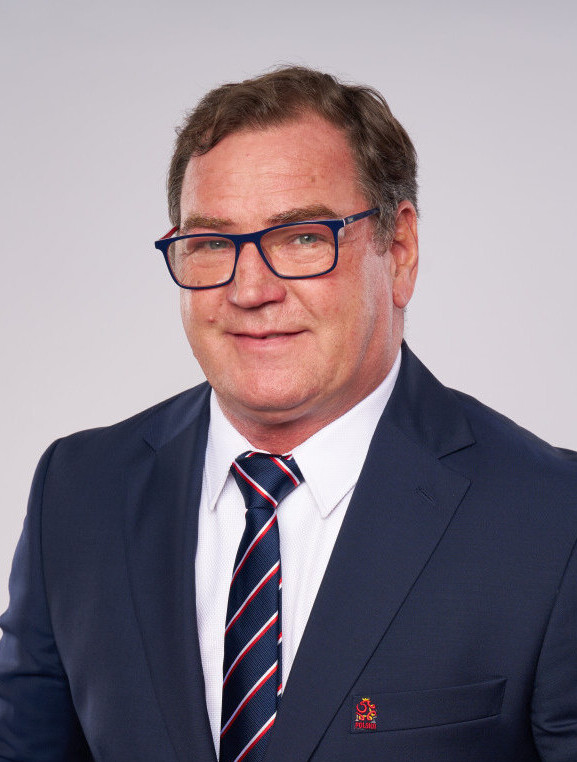
- Urban with Poland in 2025

Personal information
- Date of birth: 14 May 1962 (age 64)
- Place of birth: Jaworzno, Poland
- Height: 1.79 m (5 ft 10 in)
- Position: Striker

Team information
- Current team: Poland (manager)

Youth career
- 1980–1981: Victoria Jaworzno

Senior career*
Years	Team	Apps	(Gls)
1981–1985	Zagłębie Sosnowiec	113	(23)
1985–1989	Górnik Zabrze	124	(54)
1989–1994	Osasuna	156	(45)
1994–1995	Valladolid	21	(3)
1995–1996	Toledo	33	(6)
1996–1997	VfB Oldenburg	19	(3)
1997–1998	Górnik Zabrze	11	(1)
Total		489	(138)

International career
1985–1991	Poland	57	(7)

Managerial career
- 1999–2003: Osasuna (youth)
- 2003–2005: Osasuna B
- 2007–2010: Legia Warsaw
- 2008: Poland (assistant)
- 2010: Polonia Bytom
- 2011: Zagłębie Lubin
- 2012–2013: Legia Warsaw
- 2014–2015: Osasuna
- 2015–2016: Lech Poznań
- 2017–2018: Śląsk Wrocław
- 2021–2022: Górnik Zabrze
- 2023–2025: Górnik Zabrze
- 2025–: Poland
- * Club domestic league appearances and goals

Jan Urban (Polish pronunciation: [ˈjan ˈurban]; born 14 May 1962) is a Polish professional football manager and former player who played as a striker. He is currently the manager of the Poland national team.

His professional career was closely associated with Górnik Zabrze and Osasuna, and he coached both clubs in later years.

Urban represented Poland at the 1986 World Cup.

== Club career ==
Urban was born in Jaworzno, being one of six children in an underprivileged mining family. In his country he played for Zagłębie Sosnowiec and Górnik Zabrze, winning three Ekstraklasa championships in a row with the latter to which he contributed with a combined 38 goals, including a career-best 17 in 1987–88.

In the summer of 1989, Urban moved to Spain and joined CA Osasuna, going on to be one of the Navarre team's most important players of the following decade. He scored 13 goals in 34 games in his second season to help the club finish in a best-ever fourth position in La Liga, thus qualifying to the UEFA Cup; this included a hat-trick against Real Madrid on 30 December 1990, in a 4–0 away win.

Urban started the 1994–95 campaign with Osasuna in the second division, but returned to the top flight with Real Valladolid in the winter transfer window. He closed out his career at 36 after one-season stints with CD Toledo (also Spain, second level), VfB Oldenburg (Germany) and former side Górnik.

== International career ==
Urban earned 57 caps for Poland over six years, netting seven goals in the process. He was selected to the 1986 FIFA World Cup squad, appearing in all four matches (three starts) as the national team reached the round of 16 in Mexico.

== Managerial career ==
=== Beginnings in Spain ===
Urban settled in Pamplona after retiring, and begun his coaching career in the city, being in charge of Osasuna's youth academy. He then worked with the reserves of Osasuna in division three, moving to the offices after two seasons and leaving the club in June 2007.

=== Legia Warsaw and Poland's assistant coach ===
In the summer of 2007, Urban took over as head coach of Legia Warsaw, being responsible for signing three Osasuna players to the team, including Iñaki Astiz. He won the 2007–08 Polish Cup and the 2008 Polish Super Cup. During the UEFA Euro 2008 tournament, he served as an assistant for the Poland national team. On 14 March 2010, Urban was sacked by Legia.

=== Polonia Bytom, Zagłębie Lubin and return to Legia ===
Urban took charge of Polonia Bytom on 29 October 2010. He then signed with fellow league club Zagłębie Lubin on 10 March 2011. On 30 May 2012, he returned for a second spell with Legia, which lasted until 19 December of the following year. He won the double in the 2012–13 season, guiding Legia to achieve both the 2012–13 Ekstraklasa championship and the 2012–13 Polish Cup.

=== Return to Osasuna ===
Urban returned to Osasuna after seven years, being appointed first-team manager on 3 July 2014 after their top-flight relegation. He was dismissed the following 28 February, with the side 16th after four consecutive losses.

=== Lech Poznań ===
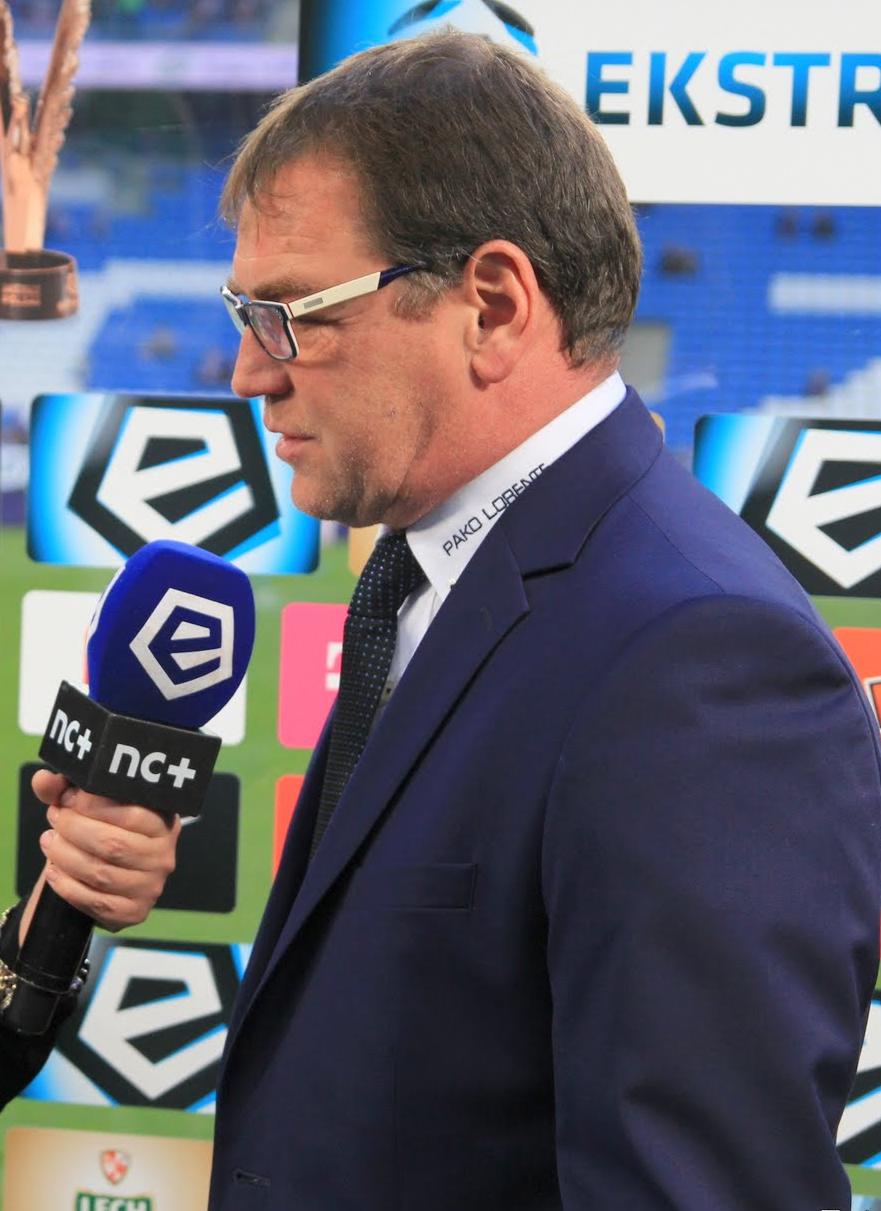
Urban as manager of Lech Poznań in 2015

In October 2015, Urban returned to Poland's top tier, taking over Lech Poznań. He was the cup runner-up and Super Cup winner in 2016, but was sacked on 29 August that year.

=== Śląsk Wrocław ===
Urban was hired by Śląsk Wrocław on an 18-month deal on 5 January 2017. On 18 February 2018, he was shown the door after losing eight of the last 13 games, and was replaced by Tadeusz Pawłowski.

=== Górnik Zabrze ===
On 27 May 2021, it was announced that Urban would take over as manager of Ekstraklasa club Górnik Zabrze immediately, replacing Marcin Brosz for the 2021–22 season. On 14 June 2022, it was announced he would be leaving the club the following day.

Despite a tumultuous exit from Górnik, he was reinstated as manager on 18 March 2023. In spite of a limited budget and frequent sales of well-performing players, he guided the club to sixth and fifth-place finishes in the league, leading Urban to be linked with a return to Legia Warsaw and taking over the Poland national team. On 15 April 2025, with the club sitting in 7th after three consecutive losses, Urban was sacked by Górnik.

=== Poland national team ===
On 16 July 2025, Urban was appointed as manager of the Poland national team, succeeding Michał Probierz. The appointment followed Probierz’s resignation in June 2025, which came after a dispute with captain Robert Lewandowski, who had been stripped of the armband and subsequently refused to play under him. The Polish Football Association president, Cezary Kulesza, described the selection of Urban as a carefully considered decision and “the right choice” to restore stability and help the team reach its potential. Upon his unveiling, Urban stressed the importance of rebuilding trust and communication within the squad, announcing plans to meet individually with senior players, including Lewandowski and Piotr Zieliński. His immediate objective was to stabilise the team and prepare Poland for the remainder of their qualification campaign for the 2026 FIFA World Cup.

Urban made his debut as Poland manager on 4 September 2025 in a World Cup qualifier against the Netherlands, followed by a home match against Finland on 7 September 2025. The opening game ended in a 1–1 draw, with Matty Cash scoring the equaliser in the 80th minute. Urban guided Poland to a second-place finish in the group stage, qualifying them for the second round. After winning 2–1 over Albania at home, Urban suffered his first loss as Poland manager in the play-off final on 31 March 2026, a 3–2 away defeat to Sweden. Minutes after the game, Cezary Kulesza announced that Urban's contract had been extended.

== Career statistics ==
Appearances and goals by national team and year
National team	Year	Apps	Goals
Poland	1985	10	0
Poland	1986	11	0
Poland	1987	10	2
Poland	1988	10	0
Poland	1989	8	2
Poland	1990	1	0
Poland	1991	7	3
Total		57	7

Scores and results list Poland's goal tally first, score column indicates score after each Urban goal.

List of international goals scored by Jan Urban
No.	Date	Venue	Opponent	Score	Result	Competition
1	18 March 1987	Municipal Stadium, Rybnik, Poland	Finland	1–0	3–1	Friendly
2	24 March 1987	Olympic Stadium, Wrocław, Poland	Norway	3–1	4–1	Friendly
3	7 February 1989	Estadio Nacional, San José, Costa Rica	Costa Rica	4–2	4–2	Friendly
4	12 April 1989	Polish Army Stadium, Warsaw, Poland	Romania	2–1	2–1	Friendly
5	17 April 1991	Polish Army Stadium, Warsaw, Poland	Turkey	2–0	3–0	UEFA Euro 1992 qualifying
6	14 August 1991	Municipal Stadium, Poznań, Poland	France	1–0	1–5	Friendly
7	16 October 1991	Municipal Stadium, Poznań, Poland	Republic of Ireland	3–3	3–3	UEFA Euro 1992 qualifying

== Managerial statistics ==
As of match played 17 November 2026

Managerial record by team and tenure
Team	Nation	From	To	Record					Ref
Team	Nation	From	To	G	W	D	L	Win %	Ref
Osasuna B	(Spain)	1 July 2003	30 June 2005	76	22	27	27	28.95	
Legia Warsaw	(Poland)	3 June 2007	14 March 2010	112	65	24	23	58.04	
Polonia Bytom	(Poland)	29 October 2010	10 December 2010	5	2	1	2	40.00	
Zagłębie Lubin	(Poland)	10 March 2011	30 October 2011	25	7	8	10	28.00	
Legia Warsaw	(Poland)	30 May 2012	19 December 2013	80	46	16	18	57.50	
Osasuna	(Spain)	3 July 2014	28 February 2015	27	8	6	13	29.63	
Lech Poznań	(Poland)	12 October 2015	29 August 2016	44	21	8	15	47.73	
Śląsk Wrocław	(Poland)	5 January 2017	19 February 2018	41	14	9	18	34.15	
Górnik Zabrze	(Poland)	27 May 2021	14 June 2022	38	15	9	14	39.47	
Górnik Zabrze	(Poland)	18 March 2023	15 April 2025	75	35	14	26	46.67	
Poland	(Poland)	16 July 2025	Present	16	6	5	5	37.50	
Total				539	241	127	171	44.71	—

== Honours ==
=== Player ===
Górnik Zabrze

- Ekstraklasa: 1985–86, 1986–87, 1987–88
- Polish Super Cup: 1988

Individual

- Ekstraklasa Hall of Fame: 2025

=== Manager ===
Legia Warsaw

- Ekstraklasa: 2012–13
- Polish Cup: 2007–08, 2012–13
- Polish Super Cup: 2008

Lech Poznań

- Polish Super Cup: 2016

Individual

- Polish Coach of the Year: 2013
- Ekstraklasa Coach of the Season: 2012–13
- Ekstraklasa Coach of the Month: November 2012, May 2023, March 2024, April 2024

== See also ==
- List of foreign La Liga players
