= Piotr Zajączkowski =

Polish football player and manager (born 1966)

Personal information
- Date of birth: 8 March 1966 (age 60)
- Place of birth: Orneta, Poland
- Height: 1.73 m (5 ft 8 in)
- Position: Midfielder

Senior career*
Years	Team	Apps	(Gls)
1982–1983	Błękitni Oreta		
1983–1984	Mlexer Elbląg		
1984–1986	Olimpia Elbląg		
1986	Jeziorak Iława		
1986–1990	Broń Radom		
1990–1994	Jagiellonia Białystok	115	(1)
1994–1995	Stomil Olsztyn	31	(0)
1995–1998	Jeziorak Iława	47	(0)
1996	→ Ceramika Opoczno (loan)	28	(1)
1998	Śląsk Wrocław	8	(0)
1998–1999	FF Jaro	14	(1)
1999	Świt Nowy Dwór Mazowiecki		
1999–2000	Stomil Olsztyn	21	(1)
2000	VPS	1	(0)
2000	Siarka Tarnobrzeg	11	(1)
2001	Unia Skierniewice	17	(0)
2001–2002	Chojniczanka Chojnice	17	(0)
2002–2005	Warmia Grajewo	63	(2)
2005–2006	Mrągowia Mrągowo		
2007–2008	Błękitni Orneta		

Managerial career
- 2003–2005: Warmia Grajewo (player-manager)
- 2005–2006: Mrągowia Mrągowo (player-manager)
- 2006–2007: Ruch Wysokie Mazowieckie
- 2007: Błękitni Oreta
- 2007–2008: Narew Ostrołęka
- 2008–2009: Ruch Wysokie Mazowieckie
- 2010: Tur Turek
- 2010–2011: Błękitni Oreta
- 2011–2012: Jeziorak Iława
- 2012–2013: Tur Turek
- 2013: ŁKS Łódź
- 2013: Calisia Kalisz
- 2014–2015: Drwęca Nowe Miasto Lubawskie
- 2015: Mławianka Mława
- 2015–2016: Olimpia Zambrów
- 2016: Mazur Ełk
- 2016–2017: Pelikan Łowicz
- 2017–2018: Drwęca Nowe Miasto Lubawskie
- 2018–2020: Stomil Olsztyn
- 2021: Kotwica Kołobrzeg
- 2021–2022: GKS Wikielec
- 2024: Stomil Olsztyn
- * Club domestic league appearances and goals

Piotr Zajączkowski (born 8 March 1966) is a Polish professional football manager and former player who was most recently in charge of III liga club Stomil Olsztyn.
