= Marcin Bochynek =

Polish football player and coach

Personal information
- Date of birth: 18 September 1942 (age 84)
- Place of birth: Zabrze, Poland

Senior career*
Years	Team	Apps	(Gls)
- Górnik Zabrze
- Zawisza Bydgoszcz
- Stal Rzeszów

Managerial career
- Górnik Knurów
- 1987–1989: Górnik Zabrze
- 1989–1990: AEL
- 1994–1995: Concordia Knurów
- 1995–1998: Odra Wodzisław
- 1998–1999: Dyskobolia Grodzisk Wielkopolski
- 1999: Górnik Zabrze
- 2001: Odra Opole
- 2001: Piast Gliwice
- 2003–2004: Concordia Knurów
- 2006: Odra Wodzisław
- 2008: Górnik Zabrze
- * Club domestic league appearances and goals

Marcin Bochynek (born 18 September 1942) is a Polish former professional footballer and manager.

== Playing career ==
Bochynek was born in Zabrze, Poland. He played for Górnik Zabrze, Zawisza Bydgoszcz and Stal Rzeszów.

== Coaching career ==
Bochynek managed Górnik Knurów, Górnik Zabrze, AEL, Odra Wodzisław, Dyskobolia Grodzisk Wielkopolski, Odra Opole and Piast Gliwice.

== Honours ==
=== Manager ===
Górnik Zabrze

- Ekstraklasa: 1987–88
- Polish Super Cup: 1988

Individual

- Polish Coach of the Year: 1988
