= Grzegorz Szerszenowicz =

Polish footballer and coach (1945–2020)

Personal information
- Full name: Grzegorz Szerszenowicz
- Date of birth: 15 January 1945
- Place of birth: Białowieża, Poland
- Date of death: 3 November 2020 (aged 75)
- Place of death: Białystok, Poland
- Position: Goalkeeper

Senior career*
Years	Team	Apps	(Gls)
1959–1965	Cresovia Gołdap		
1965–1968	AZS-AWF Warsaw		
1968–1973	Broń Radom		
1973–1975	Jagiellonia Białystok	1	(0)
1976–1979	Mazur Ełk	37	(0)

Managerial career
- 1977–1979: Mazur Ełk
- 1979–1982: Włókniarz Białystok
- 1982–1983: Sokół Sokółka
- 1984: Wigry Suwałki
- 1985–1987: Zagłębie Lubin
- 1987–1988: Lech Poznań
- 1988–1989: CS Sfaxien
- FC Lindenhurst
- 1991: MZKS Wasilków
- 1991–1993: Jagiellonia Białystok
- 1993–1995: KP Wasilków
- 1995: Hetman Białystok
- 1996–1998: Wigry Suwałki
- 1998–1999: Jagiellonia Białystok
- 1999: Cresovia Siemiatycze
- 2000: Sparta Szepietowo
- 2000–2001: Olimpia Zambrów
- 2001: Warmia Grajewo
- 2002–2003: Sparta Augustów
- 2003–2004: Wigry Suwałki
- 2004–2005: Sokół Sokółka
- 2005–2006: Sparta Augustów
- 2006–2007: Mazur Ełk
- 2007–2008: Tur Bielsk Podlaski
- 2008–2009: Olimpia Zambrów
- 2010: Sparta Augustów
- * Club domestic league appearances and goals

Grzegorz Szerszenowicz (15 January 1945 – 3 November 2020) was a Polish football manager and player who played as a goalkeeper.

== Playing career ==
He played in several clubs at home and abroad, including Cresovia Gołdap, AZS-AWF Warsaw, Broń Radom, Jagiellonia Białystok and Mazur Ełk.

== Coaching career ==
Szerszenowicz also trained several Polish clubs like Mazur Ełk, Wigry Suwałki, Sokół Sokółka, Warmia Grajewo, Zagłębie Lubin, Lech Poznań and Jagiellonia Białystok.

== Personal life ==
He graduated from the Józef Piłsudski University of Physical Education and Warsaw School of Economics.

== Honours ==
=== Manager ===
Lech Poznań

- Polish Cup: 1987–88
