= Józef Dankowski =

Polish footballer and manager

Personal information
- Full name: Józef Jerzy Dankowski
- Date of birth: 16 March 1960 (age 66)
- Place of birth: Walentynowo, Poland
- Height: 1.82 m (6 ft 0 in)
- Position: Defender

Senior career*
Years	Team	Apps	(Gls)
1982–1990	Górnik Zabrze	188	(13)
1990–1991	AEL	26	(1)
1991–1992	Hetman Zamość		
1993	Concordia Knurów		
1993–1994	Polonia Warsaw	30	(2)
1994–1995	Stal Stalowa Wola	28	(1)
1995–1997	Concordia Knurów		

International career
1985–1987	Poland	3	(0)

Managerial career
- 1999: Górnik Zabrze
- 2000: Górnik Zabrze
- 2000–2001: Górnik Zabrze
- 2003–2004: Piast Gliwice
- 2004: Przyszłość Rogów
- 2005–2007: Concordia Knurów
- 2007–2010: Piast Gliwice (assistant)
- 2010: GKS Katowice (assistant)
- 2014–2015: Górnik Zabrze
- 2016–2017: Górnik Zabrze (assistant)
- 2017–2018: Unia Turza Śląska
- 2018–2020: Wilki Wilcza
- * Club domestic league appearances and goals

Józef Jerzy Dankowski (born 16 March 1960) is a Polish football manager and former player who most recently managed Wilki Wilcza.

== Career ==
Dankowski began his career with Górnik Zabrze, a club for whom he would play several seasons in the Polish Ekstraklasa. He had a spell with AEL in the Super League Greece.

After he retired from playing, Dankowski became a football manager. He led his former club Górnik Zabrze on multiple occasions.

== Honours ==
Górnik Zabrze

- Ekstraklasa: 1984–85, 1985–86, 1986–87, 1987–88
- Polish Super Cup: 1988
