= Rainer Kuchta =

Polish footballer (born 1943)

Personal information
- Full name: Rainer Wilhelm Kuchta
- Date of birth: July 8, 1943 (age 83)
- Place of birth: Gliwice, Poland
- Position: Defender

Youth career
- GKS Gliwice

Senior career*
Years	Team	Apps	(Gls)
–1963	GKS Gliwice		
1964–1965	Śląsk Wrocław		
1965	Piast Gliwice		
1965–1970	Górnik Zabrze		
1970–1975	Polonia Bytom		
1975–1976	Excelsior Roubaix		
1976	Concordia Knurów		
- * Club domestic league appearances and goals

Rainer Wilhelm Kuchta (born 8 July 1943) is a retired Polish footballer who played as a defender.

He was a three-time championship winner (1966, 1967, 1971) with Górnik Zabrze.

== Playing career ==
He started his career at GKS Gliwice where he went the through academy.

With Górnik Zabrze, he won the Ekstraklasa thrice: in 1966, 1967 and 1971, and four Polish Cups.

He played in Górnik's famous 13 March 1968 match against Manchester United, who had star player George Best in their squad at the time.

== Personal life ==
During the Stalinist regime in Poland, Kuchta's family was forbidden to use their real Silesian given names for "sounding too German"; in school he therefore went by the name Franciszek until the death of Stalin.

After retirement he emigrated to Germany and settled in Traunreut, but continues to be a lifelong active Górnik Zabrze fan.
