= Dariusz Dudek =

Polish footballer and manager

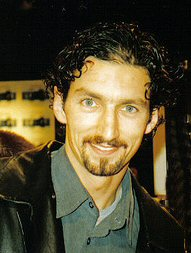

Personal information
- Full name: Dariusz Dudek
- Date of birth: 8 April 1975 (age 51)
- Place of birth: Knurów, Poland
- Height: 1.90 m (6 ft 3 in)
- Position: Centre-back

Youth career
- –1996: Concordia Knurów

Senior career*
Years	Team	Apps	(Gls)
1996–1998	Concordia Knurów		
1998	Naprzód Rydułtowy	13	(2)
1999–2000	GKS Katowice	49	(5)
1999	→ Widzew Łódź (loan)	4	(0)
2001–2002	Odra Wodzisław	41	(3)
2002–2005	Legia Warsaw	51	(2)
2005	→ Vítkovice (loan)	7	(2)
2006–2009	Odra Wodzisław	69	(2)
Total		234	(16)

Managerial career
- 2017–2018: Zagłębie Sosnowiec
- 2018–2019: GKS Katowice
- 2019–2020: Zagłębie Sosnowiec
- 2020–2022: Sandecja Nowy Sącz
- 2022–2023: Zagłębie Sosnowiec
- * Club domestic league appearances and goals

Dariusz Dudek (born 8 April 1975) is a Polish professional football manager and former player, most recently in charge of I liga club Zagłębie Sosnowiec.

== Career ==
Dudek is a former player of such a teams like GKS Katowice, Widzew Łódź, Odra Wodzisław Legia Warsaw, FC Vitkovice. Besides being a professional footballer, he served in the military, as a marine.

He is the younger brother of former Liverpool and Real Madrid goalkeeper Jerzy Dudek.
