= Marcin Brosz =

Polish footballer and manager

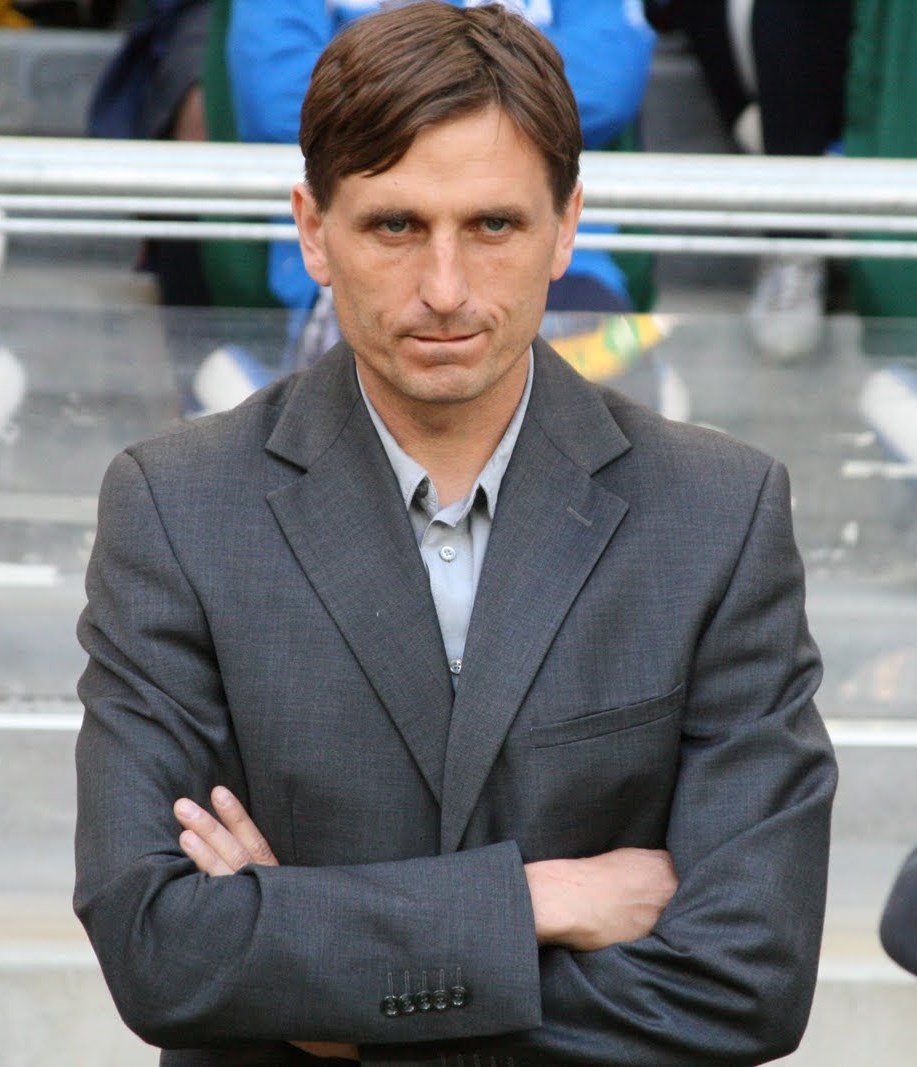
- Marcin Brosz in 2011

Personal information
- Full name: Marcin Brosz
- Date of birth: 11 April 1973 (age 53)
- Place of birth: Knurów, Poland
- Height: 1.75 m (5 ft 9 in)
- Position: Midfielder

Team information
- Current team: Bruk-Bet Termalica (manager)

Senior career*
Years	Team	Apps	(Gls)
1989–1990	Górnik Knurów		
1990–1996	Concordia Knurów		
1996–1998	Szombierki Bytom		
1998–2001	Górnik Zabrze	46	(0)
2001	→ GKS Bełchatów (loan)		
2001–2002	KS Myszków		
2002–2003	Koszarawa Żywiec		
2003–2005	Polonia Bytom		

Managerial career
- 2005: Polonia Bytom
- 2006–2007: Koszarawa Żywiec
- 2007–2009: Podbeskidzie Bielsko-Biała
- 2009–2010: Odra Wodzisław
- 2010–2014: Piast Gliwice
- 2015–2016: Korona Kielce
- 2016–2021: Górnik Zabrze
- 2022–2023: Poland U19
- 2024–: Bruk-Bet Termalica
- * Club domestic league appearances and goals

Marcin Brosz (born 11 April 1973) is a Polish professional football manager and former player who played as a midfielder. He is currently in charge of I liga club Bruk-Bet Termalica Nieciecza.

As a player, he spent his career playing for clubs in Poland. In 2005, he turned to coaching, becoming the manager of Polonia Bytom, Koszarawa Żywiec, Podbeskidzie Bielsko-Biała, Odra Wodzisław and Piast Gliwice. After that, he became the manager of Górnik Zabrze, performing his duties until 27 May 2021.

On 19 March 2024, after a stint in charge of the Poland U19 team, Brosz returned to club football to manage Bruk-Bet Termalica Nieciecza.

== Managerial statistics ==
As of match played 7 November 2026

Managerial record by team and tenure
Team	From	To	Record							
Team	From	To	G	W	D	L	GF	GA	GD	Win %
Polonia Bytom	27 April 2005	6 October 2005	24	9	5	10	31	34	−3	37.50
Koszarawa Żywiec	5 May 2006	29 June 2007	42	27	7	8	75	35	+40	64.29
Podbeskidzie Bielsko-Biała	1 July 2007	2 November 2009	83	39	22	22	135	63	+72	46.99
Odra Wodzisław	3 December 2009	10 June 2010	15	4	6	5	17	20	−3	26.67
Piast Gliwice	15 June 2010	7 May 2014	138	56	39	43	186	174	+12	40.58
Korona Kielce	25 June 2015	30 May 2016	38	10	15	13	39	48	−9	26.32
Górnik Zabrze	1 July 2016	31 May 2021	197	82	49	66	302	250	+52	41.62
Poland U19	19 January 2022	5 September 2023	11	6	2	3	19	12	+7	54.55
Bruk-Bet Termalica	19 March 2024	Present	96	41	23	32	163	145	+18	42.71
Total			644	274	168	202	967	771	+196	42.55

== Honours ==
=== Manager ===
Koszarawa Żywiec

- IV liga Silesia II: 2006–07

Piast Gliwice

- I liga: 2011–12

Individual

- Ekstraklasa Coach of the Season: 2017–18
- Ekstraklasa Coach of the Month: July 2017, August 2020, September 2020
- I liga Coach of the Month: July & August 2024, September 2024
