= Michał Zieliński =

Polish footballer (born 1984)

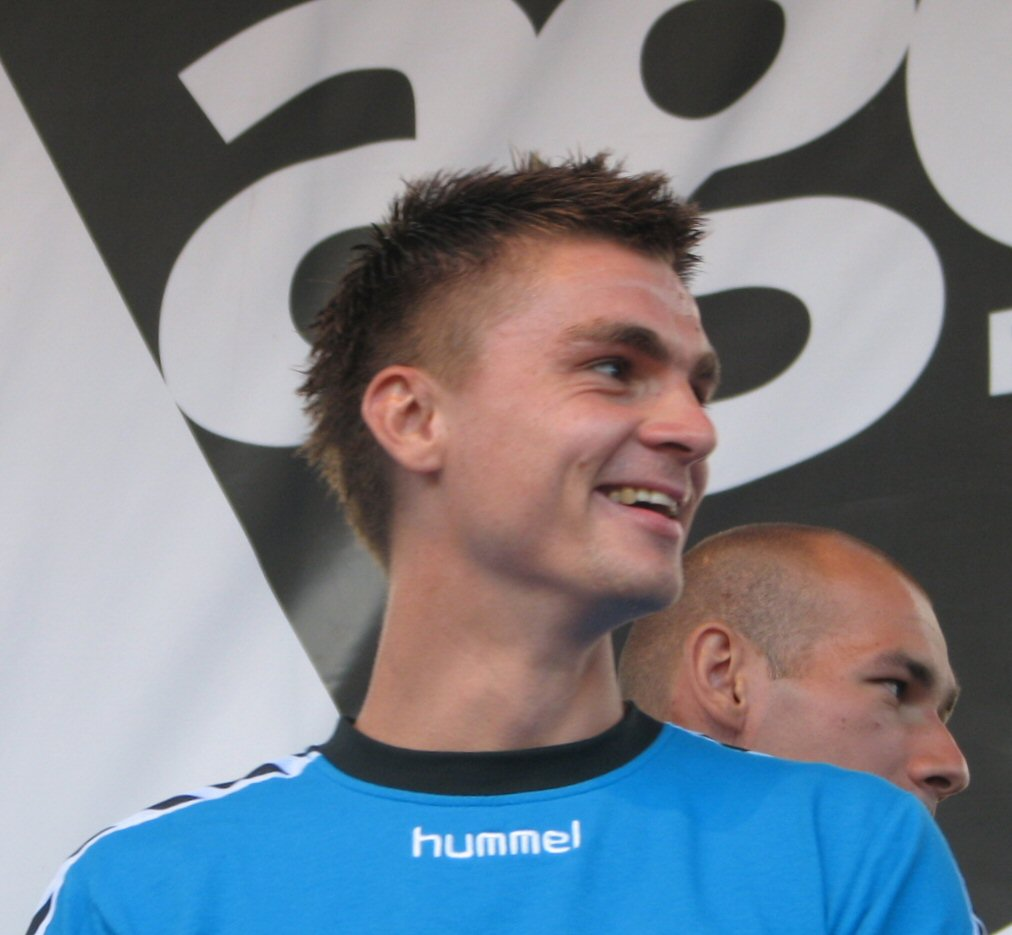
- Zieliński in 2009

Personal information
- Full name: Michał Zieliński
- Date of birth: 6 May 1984 (age 42)
- Place of birth: Żernica, Poland
- Height: 1.85 m (6 ft 1 in)
- Position: Forward

Team information
- Current team: Naprzód Żernica
- Number: 25

Youth career
- Concordia Knurów
- Naprzód Żernica

Senior career*
Years	Team	Apps	(Gls)
2003–2006	Concordia Knurów		
2007–2010	Polonia Bytom	74	(10)
2010–2013	Korona Kielce	31	(4)
2010–2011	→ GKS Katowice (loan)	19	(5)
2012	→ Górnik Zabrze (loan)	11	(2)
2013	Cracovia	10	(0)
2013–2015	GKS Katowice	22	(5)
2014	→ Polonia Bytom (loan)	20	(10)
2015–2016	Polonia Bytom	40	(12)
2016–2017	Concordia Knurów		
2017–2018	Wilki Wilcza	9	(1)
2019–	Naprzód Żernica	116	(85)

International career
2008	Poland	1	(0)
- * Club domestic league appearances and goals as of 21:44, 30 June 2026 (UTC)

Michał Zieliński (born 6 May 1984) is a Polish footballer who plays as a forward for Klasa A club Naprzód Żernica.

== Club career ==
In January 2007, he moved to Polonia Bytom from Concordia Knurów. In February 2010, he joined Korona Kielce. In summer 2010, he was loaned to GKS Katowice on a one-year deal. In January 2012, he moved to Górnik Zabrze on a loan deal lasting until June 2012.

== International career ==
He once played for Poland national team in 2008.

== Honours ==
Polonia Bytom

- III liga Opole–Silesia: 2014–15
