= Paweł Sobolewski =

Polish footballer

Personal information
- Full name: Paweł Sobolewski
- Date of birth: 20 June 1979 (age 47)
- Place of birth: Ełk, Poland
- Height: 1.75 m (5 ft 9 in)
- Position: Midfielder

Senior career*
| Years | Team | Apps | (Gls) |
| 1995–2000 | Mazur Ełk | 127 | (48) |
| 1998 | → Wigry Suwałki (loan) | 12 | (0) |
| 2000–2003 | Warmia Grajewo | 79 | (29) |
| 2001 | → Jagiellonia Białystok (loan) | 13 | (2) |
| 2003–2006 | Jagiellonia Białystok | 103 | (8) |
| 2006–2017 | Korona Kielce | 200 | (17) |
| 2016–2017 | → MKS Ełk (loan) | 25 | (2) |
| 2017–2018 | MKS Ełk | 23 | (1) |
| 2018 | Rominta Gołdap | 12 | (1) |
| 2018–2019 | Biebrza Goniądz | 10 | (0) |
| 2020–2021 | Mazur Ełk | 29 | (1) |
| 2022–2023 | Warmia Grajewo | 11 | (1) |
| 2023 | Śniardwy Orzysz | 10 | (2) |
| Total | | 664 | (112) |

Managerial career
- 2016: MKS Ełk (player-caretaker)
- 2017: MKS Ełk (player-manager)
- 2020–2022: Mazur Ełk (player-manager)
- 2022–2023: Warmia Grajewo (player-manager)
- * Club domestic league appearances and goals

Paweł Sobolewski (born 20 June 1979) is a Polish professional football manager and former player who played as a midfielder.

== Career ==
Sobolewski left Jagiellonia Białystok to join Korona Kielce in the winter break of the 2006–07 season.
