= Jacek Wiśniewski =

Polish footballer

Personal information
- Full name: Jacek Wiśniewski
- Date of birth: 8 June 1974 (age 52)
- Place of birth: Gliwice, Poland
- Height: 1.89 m (6 ft 2 in)
- Position: Defender

Senior career*
Years	Team	Apps	(Gls)
1990–1991	Sośnica Gliwice		
1991–1992	Górnik Zabrze	0	(0)
1992	VfL Hamm/Sieg	0	(0)
1992–1994	Stal Sanok		
1994–1998	Concordia Knurów		
1997–2003	Górnik Zabrze	135	(7)
2003–2004	Szczakowianka Jaworzno	26	(1)
2004–2005	Cracovia	0	(0)
2005–2006	Górnik Zabrze	17	(1)
2006–2007	Cracovia	37	(4)
2008–2009	Wisła Płock	14	(1)
2009	GKS Jastrzębie	11	(0)
2009–2011	Ruch Radzionków	37	(1)
2011	→ Rozwój Katowice (loan)	11	(0)
2012	Gwarek Ornontowice	4	(0)
2013–2016	Wilki Wilcza		
- * Club domestic league appearances and goals

Jacek Wiśniewski (born 7 June 1974) is a Polish former professional footballer who played as a defender.

Born in Gliwice, Wiśniewski began playing football with the youth side Walce Zabrze and trained as a boxer.

He played for Górnik Zabrze, Cracovia Jastrzębie and Ruch Radzionków. Wiśniewski signed a 1.5-year contract with Wisła Płock in 2008.

After he retired from playing football, Wiśniewski began a MMA career. He lost to Kamil Waluś in his debut at KSW XX, on September 15, 2012.

== Honours ==
Ruch Radzionków

- II liga West: 2009–10
