= Dariusz Zgutczyński =

Polish footballer

Personal information
- Full name: Dariusz Zgutczyński
- Date of birth: 13 February 1965 (age 61)
- Place of birth: Ełk, Poland
- Height: 1.83 m (6 ft 0 in)
- Positions: Midfielder; forward

Youth career
- –1982: Mazur Ełk

Senior career*
Years	Team	Apps	(Gls)
1982–1983	Bałtyk Gdynia	1	(0)
1984–1986	Mazur Ełk	46	(26)
1986–1991	Bałtyk Gdynia	143	(35)
1992–1994	Stal Stalowa Wola	44	(8)
1994–1995	Lechia Gdańsk	29	(1)
Total		263	(70)
- * Club domestic league appearances and goals

Dariusz Zgutczyński (born 13 February 1965) is a Polish former professional footballer who played primarily as a midfielder but also had spells playing as a forward.

== Biography ==
Zgutczyński started his career playing in the academy sides of his local team, Mazur Ełk. His first professional move came 1982 when he moved to Bałtyk Gdynia, where he played only once over the course of two seasons. He moved back to Mazur Ełk in 1984, going on to play 46 games and scoring 26 goals for his boyhood club. Zgutczyński returned to Bałtyk Gdynia in 1986, playing with the club for the next six seasons. The team mainly played in the II liga during his spell, but had one year in the I liga, where he played 28 times scoring 3 goals, and one seasons in the third tier, which was Zgutczyński's most successful goal scoring season with 17 goals. Zgutczyński joined Stal Stalowa Wola in 1992, winning promotion to the I liga in 1993, playing a further 31 times in the top tier. He joined Lechia Gdańsk for the 1994–95 season, in what would be his final season before his retirement. His final game was against Pogoń Oleśnica.

== Personal life ==
His brother is former Poland international Andrzej Zgutczyński.
