= Ryszard Wieczorek =

Polish footballer and coach (born 1962)

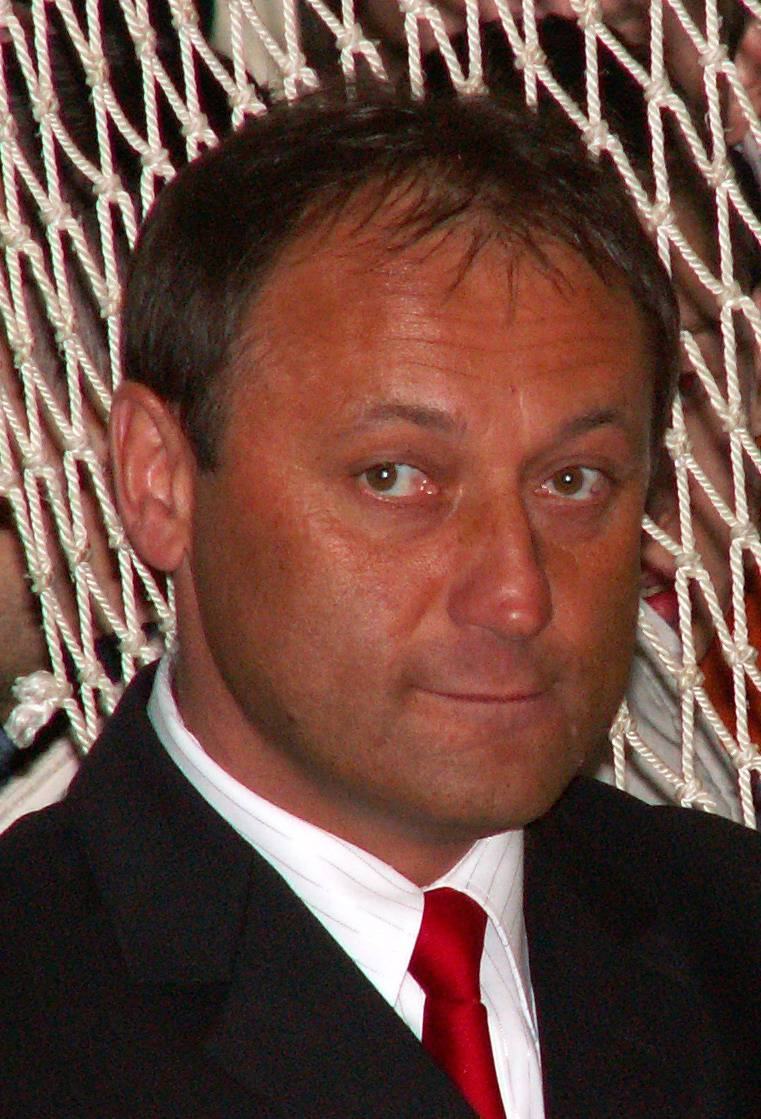
- Ryszard Wieczorek

Personal information
- Date of birth: 25 January 1962 (age 64)
- Place of birth: Wodzisław Śląski, Poland
- Height: 1.80 m (5 ft 11 in)
- Position: Midfielder

Senior career*
Years	Team	Apps	(Gls)
1980–1981	Naprzód Syrynia		
1981–1984	Górnik Pszów		
1984–1993	Odra Wodzisław	103	(23)
1993–1994	Preussen TV Werl		
1994–1998	Odra Wodzisław	133	(37)

Managerial career
- Przyszłość Rogów
- Odra Wodzisław Śląski II
- Odra Wodzisław Śląski (youth)
- 2001–2004: Odra Wodzisław
- 2004–2007: Korona Kielce
- 2007–2008: Górnik Zabrze
- 2008–2010: Odra Wodzisław
- 2010: Piast Gliwice
- 2011–2013: Energetyk ROW Rybnik
- 2013–2014: Górnik Zabrze
- 2014–2015: Limanovia Limanowa
- 2015–2016: Legionovia Legionowo
- 2016–2017: Kotwica Kołobrzeg
- 2017: Wisła Puławy
- 2018–2019: Odra Wodzisław
- 2019–2021: KKS 1925 Kalisz
- 2022: Odra Wodzisław
- 2022–2023: Polonia Bytom
- 2023: Unia Turza Śląska
- 2023: Arka Gdynia
- * Club domestic league appearances and goals

Ryszard Wieczorek (born 25 January 1962) is a Polish professional football manager and former player who played as a midfielder. He was most recently in charge of Arka Gdynia.

== Playing career ==
Wieczorek played for Naprzód Syrynia, Górnik Pszów, Odra Wodzisław and Preussen TV Werl.

== Managerial career ==
He graduated from the Warsaw Coaching School, and has previously managed Limanovia Limanowa and Wisła Puławy. He also coached Korona Kielce from 2004 until he was succeeded by Arkadiusz Kaliszan.

Wieczorek was appointed coach of Odra Wodzisław in June 2018, before moving onto KKS 1925 Kalisz a year later, winning promotion with them in 2020. He was dismissed on 19 October 2021.

On 10 May 2022, he returned to Odra for his fourth stint. He left the team at the end of the season after saving it from relegation, with a record of four wins and two losses.

Shortly after, on 1 July 2022, he was appointed manager of another III liga side, Polonia Bytom. He left the team on 9 January 2023 citing health issues, with a record of 12 wins, one draw and four losses.

On 7 March 2023, Wieczorek replaced Marek Hanzel, who himself was facing health issues, as head coach of IV liga club Unia Turza Śląska. He led the team in just four league games however, as on 11 April 2023 he signed a deal with I liga club Arka Gdynia to become their manager until the end of the season. On 16 June, it was announced Wieczorek's contract would not be extended.

== Honours ==
=== Manager ===
Korona Kielce

- II liga: 2004–05

ROW Rybnik

- II liga West: 2012–13

Odra Wodzisław

- Regional league Katowice III: 2018–19
- Polish Cup (Rybnik regionals): 2018–19

KKS 1925 Kalisz

- III liga, group II: 2019–20
- Polish Cup (Greater Poland regionals): 2019–20

Polonia Bytom

- Polish Cup (Bytom regionals): 2022–23

Unia Turza Śląska

- Polish Cup (Racibórz regionals): 2022–23
