= Zdzisław Podedworny =

Polish football coach (born 1941)

Personal information
- Date of birth: 13 April 1941 (age 85)
- Place of birth: Żabińce, Poland
- Position: Defender

Senior career*
Years	Team	Apps	(Gls)
- Kolejarz Katowice
1962–1964	Cracovia		
1964–1966	Ruch Chorzów		
1966–1969	Górnik Siemianowice		

Managerial career
- 1976–1977: Concordia Knurów
- 1980–1983: Górnik Zabrze
- 1983–1984: Olimpia Poznań
- 1984–1985: GKS Katowice
- 1989: Górnik Zabrze
- 1990–1991: Ruch Chorzów
- 1991: Cracovia
- 1992–1993: Espérance de Tunis
- 1993–1994: Al Tadamun
- 1997–1998: Al Rayyan SC
- 1998: Polonia Warsaw
- 2000: Stomil Olsztyn
- 2003: Koszarawa Żywiec
- 2006–2007: Górnik Zabrze
- * Club domestic league appearances and goals

Zdzisław Podedworny (born 13 April 1941) is a Polish former professional football manager and player.

== Coaching career ==
Podedworny managed Górnik Zabrze, Olimpia Poznań, GKS Katowice, Ruch Chorzów, Espérance de Tunis, Polonia Warsaw, Stomil Olsztyn and Koszarawa Żywiec.
