= Andrzej Zgutczyński =

Polish footballer

Personal information
- Date of birth: 1 January 1958 (age 68)
- Place of birth: Ełk, Poland
- Height: 1.79 m (5 ft 10 in)
- Position: Striker

Youth career
- 1968–1975: Mazur Ełk
- 1976: Lech Poznań

Senior career*
Years	Team	Apps	(Gls)
1976	Lech Poznań	1	(0)
1976–1978	Bałtyk Gdynia	28	(12)
1978	Legia Warsaw	0	(0)
1979–1983	Bałtyk Gdynia	112	(32)
1983–1986	Górnik Zabrze	83	(28)
1986–1987	Auxerre	31	(1)
1988–1989	Cercle Dijon Football		
1989–1990	CS Meaux		
1992–1996	Finnskoga FF Sysslebäck		
1993–1994	Bałtyk Gdynia	9	(3)
2001–2002	Radunia Stężyca		

International career
1985–1986	Poland	5	(0)
- * Club domestic league appearances and goals

Andrzej Zgutczyński (born 1 January 1958) is a Polish former professional footballer who played as a striker.

During his club career he played for Mazur Ełk, Lech Poznań, Bałtyk Gdynia, Legia Warsaw, Górnik Zabrze, AJ Auxerre, Cercle Dijon Football, and CS Meaux. He earned 5 caps for the Poland national team and participated in the 1986 FIFA World Cup, where Poland reached the second round.

== Personal life ==
His brother is former footballer Dariusz Zgutczyński.

== Honours ==
Górnik Zabrze

- Ekstraklasa: 1984–85, 1985–86

Individual

- Ekstraklasa top scorer: 1985–86
