= Jan Kowalski (footballer) =

Polish footballer

Personal information
- Full name: Jan Gerard Kowalski
- Date of birth: 15 February 1937 (age 89)
- Place of birth: Zabrze, Poland
- Height: 1.69 m (5 ft 7 in)
- Position: Midfielder

Youth career
- 1947–1955: Pogoń Zabrze
- 1956: Stal Zabrze

Senior career*
| Years | Team | Apps | (Gls) |
| 1956–1957 | Górnik Zabrze | | |
| 1957–1958 | Pogoń Zabrze | | |
| 1959–1967 | Górnik Zabrze | | |
| 1967–1969 | ROW Rybnik | | |

International career
| 1960–1962 | Poland | 10 | (0) |

Managerial career
- 1972: Górnik Zabrze
- 1972–1973: Górnik Zabrze
- 1990–1992: Górnik Zabrze
- 1996: Górnik Zabrze
- 1997: Górnik Zabrze
- * Club domestic league appearances and goals

Jan Gerard Kowalski (born 15 February 1937) is a Polish former football manager and player who played as a midfielder.

== Honours ==
=== Player ===
Górnik Zabrze

- Ekstraklasa: 1959, 1961, 1962–63, 1963–64, 1964–65, 1965–66, 1966–67
- Polish Cup: 1964–65

=== Manager ===
Górnik Zabrze

- Ekstraklasa: 1971–72
- Polish Cup: 1971–72
