= Piotr Kocąb =

Polish football manager

Personal information
- Date of birth: 11 September 1952 (age 74)
- Place of birth: Mikołajowice, Poland

Managerial career
- Years: Team
- 1993–1995: Hutnik Kraków
- 1996–1997: Górnik Zabrze
- 1997–1998: Cracovia
- 2000–2003: LKS Niedźwiedź
- 2003: Przebój Wolbrom
- 2003–2004: Proszowianka Proszowice
- 2006: Płomień Jerzmanowice
- 2007–2008: Kmita Zabierzów

Piotr Kocąb (born 11 September 1952) is a Polish former professional football manager.
