= Jan Żurek =

Polish football manager

Personal information
- Date of birth: 14 July 1956 (age 70)
- Place of birth: Oleśnica, Poland

Youth career
- Górnik Zabrze

Senior career*
Years	Team	Apps	(Gls)
- Walka Zabrze

Managerial career
- 1992–1994: Ruch Radzionków
- 1996: Górnik Zabrze
- 1996–1997: Polonia Bytom
- 1997: Ruch Radzionków
- 1997–2000: Górnik Zabrze
- 2000: Widzew Łódź
- 2000: Ruch Chorzów
- 2000–2001: Ruch Radzionków
- 2002–2003: GKS Katowice
- 2003–2004: GKS Katowice
- 2004–2005: Podbeskidzie Bielsko-Biała
- 2006: Polonia Warsaw
- 2006–2007: Śląsk Wrocław
- 2008: GKS Katowice
- 2010–2012: Iskra Pszczyna
- 2012–2013: LZS Piotrówka
- 2013–2014: GKS Tychy
- 2015: Polonia Łaziska Górne
- 2016: Górnik Zabrze
- 2016–: Górnik Zabrze (youth coordinator)
- * Club domestic league appearances and goals

Jan Żurek (born 14 July 1956) is a Polish professional football manager and former player.

On 20 October 2009, Żurek returned to Górnik Zabrze as a scout. Between 2010 and 2012, he coached Iskra Pszczyna. From 29 November 2012, he was the coach of LZS Piotrówka.
