= Vladimir Sladojević =

Bosnian footballer

Personal information
- Date of birth: 12 May 1984 (age 42)
- Place of birth: Banja Luka, SFR Yugoslavia
- Height: 1.93 m (6 ft 4 in)
- Position: Forward

Youth career
- Borac Banja Luka
- Partizan
- Sochaux

Senior career*
| Years | Team | Apps | (Gls) |
| 2001–2003 | Brescia | 0 | (0) |
| 2003–2004 | Górnik Zabrze | 9 | (2) |
| 2004 | Ružomberok | 1 | (0) |
| 2005 | Drava Ptuj | 9 | (1) |
| 2006 | NK Holermuos Ormož | 0 | (0) |
| 2008–2009 | Zadar | 0 | (0) |
- * Club domestic league appearances and goals

Vladimir Sladojević (born 12 May 1984) is a Bosnian former professional footballer who played as a forward. He played for Górnik Zabrze in the Polish Ekstraklasa, MFK Ružomberok in the Slovak Superliga and NK Drava in the Slovenian PrvaLiga.
