= Tomasz Arceusz =

Polish footballer

Personal information
- Date of birth: 11 September 1956 (age 70)
- Place of birth: Raciąż, Poland
- Height: 1.79 m (5 ft 10 in)
- Position: Forward

Senior career*
Years	Team	Apps	(Gls)
–1978	Błękitni Raciąż		
1978–1981	Ursus Warsaw		
1981–1982	Motor Lublin	22+	(1+)
1982–1984	BKS Stal Bielsko-Biała		
1984	Śniardwy Orzysz		
1985–1989	Legia Warsaw	111	(25)
1989	Vaasan Palloseura	22	(20)
1990	Legia Warsaw	2	(0)
1990–1996	Vaasan Palloseura	150	(49)
1997	JJK Jyväskylä	5	(0)

Managerial career
- 1995: Vaasan Palloseura (player-manager)
- 1997: Sundom IF
- 2005–2007: Kiisto
- 2008: VIFK
- * Club domestic league appearances and goals

Tomasz Arceusz (born 11 September 1959) is a Polish former professional footballer who played as a forward.
