= Concordia Knurów =

Polish association football club

- Full name: Klub Sportowy Concordia Knurów
- Founded: 5 August 1923; 103 years ago
- Ground: Municipal Stadium
- Capacity: 7,000
- Chairman: Mariusz Jankowski
- Manager: Jarosław Kupis
- League: V liga Silesia I
- 2024–25: Regional league Silesia I, 1st of 16 (promoted)
- Website: https://www.mksconcordiaknurow.pl
Home colours	Away colours	Third colours

Concordia Knurów is a Polish football club from Knurów, Upper Silesia. They have spent a significant part of their history under the name Górnik Knurów. Their primary colours are green and white and away colours are black.

== History ==
=== Foundation and naming of the club ===
The first section of KS Concordia Knurów, which actively functioned and had been successful - mainly in Silesia - was the palant section. In the years 1923-1926 there was a female section in the club playing "tamburyna", a five-a-side game which consisted of hitting the ball over a suspended string. At turn of the years 1922 and 1923, more than a dozen football fans helped in the creation of the football section.

Founding meeting took place on 5 August 1923. The first chairman was Wojnar. Already in 1924, the club underwent the appropriate changes. The Knurów Coal Mine took patronage of the club. The new chairman Czeslaw Jakobkiewicz was appointed, who changed the original name from "Klub Sportowy Knurów" to "Klub Sportowy Concordia Knurów".

In the postwar period twice changed its name to "Górnik" (Miner). First in 1950, then in 1966 to "Międzyzakładowy Klub Sportowy Górnik Knurów". In 1955, the then activist Adolf Schinohl, changed Górnik to "Górniczy Klub Sportowy Concordia Knurów" or "GKS" for short, a common abbreviation for mining clubs.

=== The first matches and the suspension of the club ===
The first Concordia matches proceeded in the spring of 1923, in peripheral competitions. A year later Knurów played in C-klasa, the newly created region of Rybnik. After three years they were promoted to B-klasa, by 1929 they were already in A-klasa. In 1930, leading clubs from Silesian A-klasa passed reorganized championships and formed the Silesian league. In the 1930s Concordia players were among the top teams this league, encountering hard-fought matches with Pogoń Katowice and AKS Chorzów. The team had regular season meetings with teams from outside Silesia (Wisła Kraków, Garbarnia Kraków). Meanwhile, several players were called up to the Silesian national team, most notably A.Chromik and B. Szleger.

The activities of the club was discontinued due to the outbreak of World War II. Knurów proceeded to start in the tournament in 1945, playing in the Rybnik B-klasa. In the autumn of 1946 Knurów competed with varying degrees of success in A-klasa, and a year later became vice-champion of Silesia, losing the decisive meeting with Ruch Chorzów (0:2 and 1:5). After the end of next season, Concordia gained promotion to a separate Silesian league. However, due to the liquidation of the league the club was demoted back to the A-klasa.

=== Golden era ===
The disappointment of relegation did not last long. Early in the 1950/1951 season, then as Górnik Knurów, for the first time in history, won promotion to the second division. Their debut took place on 8 April 1951, when the Knurów players defeated at home Włókniarz Chełmek by a score of 4:0. Playing in group D, they finished the first season in the second league in 3rd place, giving way to Wawel Kraków and Zagłębie Sosnowiec. After the 1951/1952 season another reorganisation of the league structure took place. Despite the fact that Górnik finished in 7th place in group C (ten teams), they were relegated to an inter-voivodeship.

In the 1957/1958 season, the second division was divided into two groups: northern and southern. As a result of its enlargement, the club now as Concordia Knurów, was promoted as vice-champion of Silesia from the previous season. This time they played in that league till 1959/1960. Occupying 11th place in the southern group (12 teams), with only Wawel Wirek placed lower, the club was relegated from the league. However the name "Górnik" replaced the name "Concordia" in 1966 once more.

The return to the second tier came in the 1980/1981 season. The inaugural match was against Gwardia Warsaw. The meeting took place in Knurów, and they achieved a goalless drew with Gwardia, who were a newly relegated club from the top division at the time. The club coached by Marcin Bochynek finished 11th, ahead of Broń Radom, Ursus Warsaw, Concordia Piotrków Trybunalski, Jagiellonia Białystok and Star Starachowice.

In the season 1986/1987 and 1987/1988 they finished in the second league twice in third place, which entitled them to perform in the play-off matches for promotion to the Ekstraklasa. The first rival was Stal Stalowa Wola. The first game at home, the match ended with the victory of Marcin Bochynka's side 2: 1 (home goals scored by Krzysztof Zagorski and Kozik). However, in the rematch, they lost 0:2 Stal Stalowa Wola were promoted instead.

The second promotion opportunity was against Wisła Kraków. The first match, after a goal by Krzysztof Zagorski ended with the victory for Knurów. The second leg ended in victory for the 'White Star' 4:2. In the 85th minute, despite the score at 3:2 to Wisła, Wisła still would not get promoted. In the last seconds of the match, Wójtowicz scored for Wisła a promotion-winning goal. After the game, the Knurów players were accused of selling the match.

Wisla Kraków have already faced Górnik Knurów eliminating them in the 1/4 finals of the Polish Cup. For the first time Knurów advanced to the quarter-finals in this competition in the 1983/1984 season. In the 1/64 finals Górnik defeated their namesake from Konin 4:2, in the next round Górnik beat Hutnik Nowa Huta 2:0. In the 1/16 finals they faced Śląsk Wrocław. After 17 minutes of play Knurów led 1:0 and 4 minutes later, Rajmund Krettek beat the Wrocław keeper for a second time. Śląsk replied to Krettek's two goals only with a single goal by Ryszard Tarasiewicz and thus Knurów advanced to the next round of the competition. In the 1/8 final Górnik faced GKS Katowice and again after two goals by Krettek (2:1) advanced to the quarter-finals, where they were drawn against the aforementioned Wisła. The first battle for the semi-finals ended with a 3:2 Wisła victory (goal for Knurów scored Szlezak and Krettek). In the return leg, Górnik was beaten 0:1 and thus were knocked out of the Polish Cup.

Górnik played amongst second division teams until 1988/1989. After the reorganization of the league, in a relegation play-off tie with Miedź Legnica, Górnik lost (1:2 and 1:0) and dropped to the third division. In 1991 the club once again was renamed Concordia.

The closest Concordia came to achieving re-promotion to Division Two, was in the 1994/1995 season under the leadership of Marcin Bochynek with which the players had significant successes in the past in the Second Division and in the Polish Cup. Their hopes were dashed by Varta Namysłów players who beat Concordia in Knurów 1:0.

=== Demise ===
Former club crest

The good times ended with the demise of the Polish People's Republic, in particular, after relegation from the second league. In the 1980s in the vicinity of the Municipal Stadium, a sports and hotel complex was meant to be built. The building, however, was never built, and all the electrical wiring was all stolen in recent years.

The 2001/2002 season was the last time Concordia played in the third division. Finishing the second half of the season in 18th place - they dropped to the fourth tier. After the end of the 2003/2004 season the Concordia team were in 15th place, just ahead of Unia Strzemieszyce. They have played in the district leagues since, currently in the fifth tier.

On 19 February 2003, the then president of the club, Zbigniew Gałkowski, changed the name of the club from "GKS Concordia Knurów" to "KS Concordia Knurów".

== Etymology & naming history ==
As Knurów is a mining town, and in the Polish People's Republic clubs frequently changed names depending which institution presided over the club, since its inception as "KS Knurów", the club underwent many naming changes, usually typical of Polish sports mining clubs, most notably "Górnik" ("Miner") and "Górniczy Klub Sportowy" abbreviated to "GKS" ("Miner's Sports Club"), both popular to this day among many Polish clubs. However, the name "Concordia" was the clubs first given name and had been used and re-instated throughout its history.

- (05.08.1923) – KS Knurów
- (1924) – KS Concordia Knurów
- (1950) – ZKS Górnik Knurów
- (1955) – GKS Concordia Knurów
- (1966) – MZKS Górnik Knurów
- (01.01.1991) – GKS Concordia Knurów
- (2002) – KS Concordia Knurów

== Fans ==
The biggest attendance of fans in the stadium in Knurów, was recorded in the club's years in the second division, when the stadium could officially accommodate 12 000 spectators. After the promotion play-off defeat against Wisła Kraków, after which the players were accused of match-fixing, the attendances drastically fell. In the 1990s at third division matches attracted large numbers of fans not only from Knurów, but also from Zabrze, Gliwice, and Rybnik.

In recent years, many crowds gathered at matches organised by Jerzy Dudek, where he started his career; for matches involving "Jerzy Dudek & friends" with players such as Milan Baroš, Vladimír Šmicer or Jacek Krzynówek taking part.

The club currently has a small organised ultras group called Torcida Knurów, which supports Concordia during important matches home and away, but also attend Górnik Zabrze matches as they consider themselves Górnik fans too.

=== 2015 riots ===
On 2 May 2015, at a Concordia Knurów versus Ruch Radzionków fifth division match in Knurów, police started firing rubber bullets at fans from a close distance after several home fans jumped onto the pitch and ran towards the visiting fans.

A 27-year-old fan of Concordia, Dawid Dziedzic, was shot, and despite attempts to resuscitate him he died shortly in hospital hours later. He was a single father, described as a caring parent from a modest background.

In the aftermath, hundreds of fans have clashed with police outside the police headquarters, with the riots lasting several days. 46 people were arrested, many injured fans as well as policemen.

Thousands of people have attended Dawid's funeral on 7 May 2015.

== Notable players ==
The club has had a few famous players in its squad who played or coached in the Ekstraklasa and even in the national team, for most Concordia was where they started their professional careers:

- Henryk Bałuszyński
- Marcin Bochynek
- Marcin Brosz
- Józef Dankowski
- Dariusz Dudek
- Jerzy Dudek
- Piotr Jegor
- Alfred Olek
- Zdzisław Podedworny
- Zygfryd Szołtysik
- Jacek Wiśniewski
- Michał Zieliński

Arguably the most famous players are the Dudek brothers, Jerzy and Dariusz who hail from Knurów and started their careers at Concordia, and are considered local celebrities. Other players that may be considered notable may be Henryk Janduda, an AKS Chorzów player in the 1930s and Alfred Olek who played for Górnik Zabrze and Hamilton Academical in the 1970s. Rafał Krzyśka and Tomasz Dura are international Polish futsal players, who also started their careers at the club.
