= Mazur Ełk =

Polish football club

- Full name: Miejski Klub Sportowy; Mazur Ełk
- Nicknames: Mazurek; Kolejarz
- Founded: 1 May 1946; 79 years ago
- Ground: MOSiR Stadium
- Capacity: 3,000
- Chairman: Radosław Dorszewski
- Coach: Oleksandr Berezovskyi
- League: IV liga Warmia-Masuria
- 2023–24: IV liga Warmia-Masuria, 12th of 16
- Website: https://mazurelk.pl
Home colours	Away colours

Mazur Ełk is a Polish football club from the city of Ełk in Masuria. They currently play in the IV liga of Warmia-Masuria, the fifth level of the Polish league system. The club was founded in 1946.

== Historical names ==
- 1946 – Wojskowy Klub Sportowy (WKS) Mazur Ełk (dissolved in 1953)
- 1946 – Kolejowy Klub Sportowy (KKS) Ełk (1949 Związkowy Klub Sportowy (ZKS) Kolejarz Ełk)
- 1955 – Kolejowy Klub Sportowy (KKS) Mazur Ełk
- 1990 – Miejski Klub Sportowy (MKS) Mazur Ełk

== Support ==
Mazur Ełk's fans are known for their support beyond the club's stadium through numerous graffiti, including the unofficial club motto Jedno miasto, jeden klub. Graffiti produced by supporters of the club has become so numerous in Ełk that it has attracted satirical responses from a local street artist.

At the beginning of the millennium, organised support at Mazur Ełk was politically left-leaning with fans displaying anti-Nazi banners in the stadium during matches.

Historically, fans of Mazur Ełk maintained a friendship with those of Legia Warsaw, however they now have a longstanding friendship with supporters of the teams Jagiellonia Białystok and Warmia Grajewo.

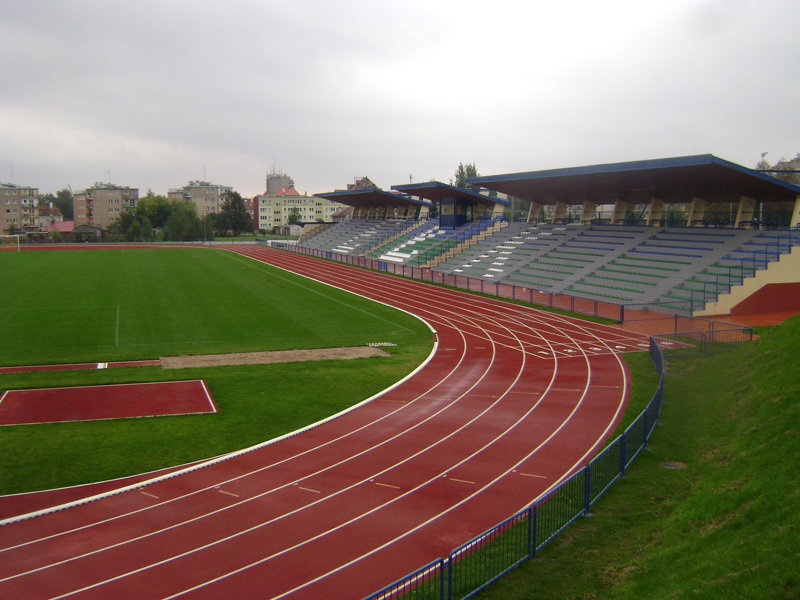
Mazur Ełk's Stefan Marcinkiewicz stadium

== Notable players ==
- Andrzej Zgutczyński
- Paweł Sobolewski
