= 1985–86 Ekstraklasa =

Liga
- Season: 1985–86
- Champions: Górnik Zabrze (12th title)
- Relegated: Bałtyk Gdynia; Zagłębie Sosnowiec
- Matches: 240
- Goals: 597 (2.49 per match)
- Top goalscorer: Andrzej Zgutczyński (20 goals)
- Average attendance: 10,044 ▼18.7%

Statistics of Ekstraklasa for the 1985–86 season.

== Overview ==
It was contested by 16 teams, and Górnik Zabrze won the championship.

== League table ==
Pos	Team	Pld	W	D	L	GF	GA	GD	Pts	Qualification or relegation
1	Górnik Zabrze (C)	30	21	4	5	70	17	+53	46	Qualification to European Cup first round
2	Legia Warsaw	30	17	8	5	55	29	+26	42	Qualification to UEFA Cup first round
3	Widzew Łódź	30	15	11	4	40	25	+15	41	Qualification to UEFA Cup first round
4	Lech Poznań	30	12	12	6	36	29	+7	36	
5	GKS Katowice	30	10	11	9	46	45	+1	31	Qualification to Cup Winners' Cup first round
6	Górnik Wałbrzych	30	10	10	10	41	50	−9	30	
7	Śląsk Wrocław	30	9	11	10	39	35	+4	29	
8	ŁKS Łódź	30	8	12	10	36	36	0	28	
9	Ruch Chorzów	30	12	4	14	35	39	−4	28	
10	Pogoń Szczecin	30	8	11	11	44	44	0	27	
11	Stal Mielec	30	10	5	15	25	32	−7	25	
12	Zagłębie Lubin	30	8	9	13	22	32	−10	25	
13	Motor Lublin	30	6	13	11	33	47	−14	25	
14	Lechia Gdańsk	30	7	10	13	23	35	−12	24	
15	Bałtyk Gdynia (R)	30	7	9	14	28	47	−19	23	Relegated to II liga
16	Zagłębie Sosnowiec (R)	30	6	8	16	24	54	−30	20	Relegated to II liga

Source: 90minut.pl (in Polish)
(C) Champions; (R) Relegated

== Results ==
Home \ Away	BGD	KAT	GWŁ	GÓR	LPO	LGD	LEG	ŁKS	MOL	POG	RUC	STA	ŚLĄ	WID	ZLU	ZSO
Bałtyk Gdynia		0–1	0–1	0–0	1–1	1–1	1–1	1–0	0–0	3–1	2–1	2–0	1–1	1–1	1–0	1–0
GKS Katowice	3–4		5–0	3–2	0–0	1–0	1–1	1–1	4–4	5–4	1–2	1–1	2–1	1–1	3–0	1–0
Górnik Wałbrzych	1–1	2–0		1–4	2–3	3–0	1–1	2–2	2–1	1–1	1–2	0–0	0–0	1–2	3–1	3–1
Górnik Zabrze	4–0	4–1	2–0		1–2	1–0	3–0	3–1	1–1	3–0	4–0	2–0	5–0	4–0	2–0	6–0
Lech Poznań	2–0	2–0	2–2	0–1		1–0	1–4	1–0	2–0	1–0	2–0	2–2	1–0	1–1	1–1	1–0
Lechia Gdańsk	2–0	0–0	1–0	0–2	0–0		0–2	0–0	2–2	2–1	2–0	2–0	4–4	1–1	1–1	0–0
Legia Warsaw	4–3	1–0	1–1	4–1	2–0	2–0		3–0	1–1	3–2	0–0	2–0	1–0	3–0	3–0	4–1
ŁKS Łódź	4–2	1–2	3–3	0–0	2–2	1–0	1–1		0–0	4–2	3–1	1–0	0–1	0–0	3–1	2–1
Motor Lublin	0–0	2–2	2–3	0–4	1–1	3–1	1–4	1–0		4–2	0–3	2–0	2–0	0–2	0–0	0–3
Pogoń Szczecin	3–0	0–0	2–3	0–0	1–1	1–0	1–3	1–1	4–1		2–2	1–0	1–1	1–1	0–0	5–0
Ruch Chorzów	3–0	2–2	4–0	1–0	2–1	0–1	3–2	2–1	0–1	0–2		0–1	3–2	0–0	1–0	1–0
Stal Mielec	2–0	1–0	0–1	0–3	2–0	3–0	0–1	2–0	2–1	0–1	2–1		3–2	1–2	0–1	1–0
Śląsk Wrocław	4–0	1–1	0–1	2–1	3–1	1–1	3–0	1–1	1–1	1–1	2–1	2–1		2–0	0–0	1–2
Widzew Łódź	2–1	5–1	6–1	0–1	1–1	1–0	3–1	0–0	1–1	1–0	2–0	1–0	1–0		1–0	1–1
Zagłębie Lubin	2–1	1–0	2–1	1–2	0–0	0–1	0–0	2–0	1–0	1–2	2–0	1–1	0–3	0–1		3–0
Zagłębie Sosnowiec	2–1	2–4	1–1	0–4	0–3	3–1	1–0	0–4	1–1	2–2	1–0	0–0	0–0	1–2	1–1	

Source: 90minut.pl (in Polish)
Legend: Blue = home team win; Yellow = draw; Red = away team win.

== Top goalscorers ==
Rank	Player	Club	Goals
1	(Poland) Andrzej Zgutczyński	Górnik Zabrze	20
2	(Poland) Jan Furtok	GKS Katowice	17
2	(Poland) Leszek Kosowski	Górnik Wałbrzych	17
4	(Poland) Tomasz Arceusz	Legia Warsaw	14
5	(Poland) Mirosław Okoński	Lech Poznań	12
5	(Poland) Mirosław Bąk	Ruch Chorzów	12
5	(Poland) Ryszard Robakiewicz	ŁKS Łódź	12
8	(Poland) Krzysztof Warzycha	Ruch Chorzów	11

== Attendances ==
#	Club	Average
1	Górnik Zabrze	19,067
2	Lechia Gdańsk	16,133
3	Zagłębie Lubin	16,133
4	Lech Poznań	14,067
5	Legia Warszawa	13,400
6	Widzew Łódź	11,600
7	Pogoń Szczecin	9,767
8	Śląsk Wrocław	9,733
9	Stal Mielec	8,867
10	Motor Lublin	7,800
11	Ruch Chorzów	7,233
12	ŁKS	7,133
13	Górnik Wałbrzych	7,067
14	Katowice	5,200
15	Bałtyk Gdynia	3,967
16	Zagłębie Sosnowiec	3,533
