= 1987–88 Ekstraklasa =

61st season of top-tier football league in Poland

Liga
- Season: 1987–88
- Champions: Górnik Zabrze (14th title)
- Relegated: Zagłębie Lubin; Lechia Gdańsk; Bałtyk Gdynia; Stal Stalowa Wola
- Matches: 240
- Goals: 515 (2.15 per match)
- Top goalscorer: Dariusz Dziekanowski (20 goals)
- Average attendance: 9,840 ▲3.3%

Statistics of the Ekstraklasa for the 1987–88 season.

== Overview ==
It was contested by 16 teams, and Górnik Zabrze won the championship.

== League table ==
Pos	Team	Pld	W	3W	D	3L	L	GF	GA	GD	Pts	Qualification or relegation
1	Górnik Zabrze (C)	30	13	6	7	0	4	65	30	+35	51	Qualification to European Cup first round
2	GKS Katowice	30	11	3	9	0	7	40	23	+17	40	Qualification to UEFA Cup first round
3	Legia Warsaw	30	13	2	8	1	6	39	27	+12	39	Qualification to UEFA Cup first round
4	ŁKS Łódź	30	13	3	5	1	8	40	29	+11	39	
5	Widzew Łódź	30	7	1	15	1	6	28	24	+4	31	
6	Śląsk Wrocław	30	7	2	11	2	8	32	30	+2	29	
7	Szombierki Bytom	30	10	0	10	1	9	28	29	−1	29	
8	Jagiellonia Białystok	30	11	0	7	0	12	24	25	−1	29	
9	Lech Poznań	30	9	1	9	2	9	29	30	−1	28	Qualification to Cup Winners' Cup first round
10	Pogoń Szczecin	30	11	1	5	2	11	32	36	−4	28	
11	Zagłębie Lubin (R)	30	8	0	10	0	12	23	25	−2	26	Qualification to Relegation playoffs
12	Lechia Gdańsk (R)	30	6	0	14	0	10	18	26	−8	26	Qualification to Relegation playoffs
13	Olimpia Poznań	30	5	2	11	3	9	36	46	−10	24	Qualification to Relegation playoffs
14	Górnik Wałbrzych	30	5	1	11	0	13	24	36	−12	24	Qualification to Relegation playoffs
15	Bałtyk Gdynia (R)	30	8	1	6	4	11	27	41	−14	21	Relegated to II liga
16	Stal Stalowa Wola (R)	30	5	1	9	6	9	31	56	−25	16	Relegated to II liga

Source: 90minut.pl (in Polish)
Rules for classification: 1st points; 2nd goal difference; 3rd goals scored. 1 extra point for each win with a goal difference of 3 or more, and 1 point deducted for each loss with a goal difference of 3 or more.
(C) Champion; (R) Relegated

== Results ==
Home \ Away	BGD	KAT	GWŁ	GÓR	JAG	LPO	LGD	LEG	ŁKS	OLP	POG	SSW	SZB	ŚLĄ	WID	ZLU
Bałtyk Gdynia		0–0	2–0	1–5	2–0	0–1	0–0	1–3	0–3	1–0	1–2	2–0	2–1	3–0	1–0	2–0
GKS Katowice	4–0		2–0	3–3	1–0	4–0	2–1	1–0	1–0	1–1	1–0	4–1	2–0	2–0	2–2	1–0
Górnik Wałbrzych	1–1	0–0		1–1	1–0	1–0	0–0	1–3	2–0	0–0	1–0	5–3	3–0	1–1	0–1	0–0
Górnik Zabrze	3–2	1–1	3–1		2–3	2–1	2–0	1–1	4–0	3–1	2–0	4–0	3–1	1–0	3–2	3–0
Jagiellonia Białystok	3–1	2–1	2–0	1–3		1–0	1–2	2–0	1–0	2–1	1–0	1–1	1–0	1–0	1–1	0–0
Lech Poznań	1–0	2–2	0–0	2–0	1–0		2–1	2–0	2–0	2–2	4–0	0–0	0–1	0–0	2–0	0–2
Lechia Gdańsk	0–0	1–0	1–0	1–1	0–0	1–1		1–1	0–0	3–2	0–1	1–1	0–0	1–0	0–0	1–0
Legia Warsaw	3–0	0–0	2–0	0–1	1–0	2–0	2–1		0–0	3–1	1–0	3–1	1–1	3–0	1–0	1–0
ŁKS Łódź	1–0	1–0	3–1	0–1	0–0	2–2	2–0	4–1		3–2	4–1	3–1	2–0	2–1	1–0	2–1
Olimpia Poznań	1–0	0–1	2–1	1–4	1–0	1–3	1–1	2–2	1–1		1–1	4–1	1–0	0–0	2–2	2–1
Pogoń Szczecin	2–0	2–1	1–0	3–1	1–0	2–0	2–0	1–1	1–2	3–0		3–1	0–0	1–0	1–1	0–2
Stal Stalowa Wola	1–1	2–1	1–1	0–3	0–0	1–1	2–0	1–2	3–1	4–1	2–0		1–1	0–0	1–3	0–1
Szombierki Bytom	0–1	2–0	2–0	3–2	1–0	0–0	2–1	2–0	0–1	1–0	4–2	0–1		1–1	0–0	2–1
Śląsk Wrocław	4–2	2–1	1–1	0–2	2–1	3–0	1–0	2–0	2–1	1–1	2–1	5–1	1–1		1–1	0–2
Widzew Łódź	1–0	0–0	3–1	0–0	0–0	1–0	0–0	0–0	1–0	1–4	2–0	4–0	1–1	0–0		1–1
Zagłębie Lubin	1–1	0–1	1–1	1–1	2–0	1–0	0–0	1–2	0–1	0–0	1–1	1–0	1–1	1–1	1–0	

Source: 90minut.pl (in Polish)
Legend: Blue = home team win; Yellow = draw; Red = away team win.

== Relegation playoffs ==
The matches were played on 25 and 28 June 1988.

Team 1	Agg.	Team 2	1st leg	2nd leg
Olimpia Poznań	3–2	Lechia Gdańsk	1–0	2–2
Górnik Wałbrzych	4–3	Zagłębie Lubin	2–1	2–2

== Top goalscorers ==
Rank	Player	Club	Goals
1	(Poland) Dariusz Dziekanowski	Legia Warsaw	20
2	(Poland) Jan Furtok	GKS Katowice	18
3	(Poland) Jan Urban	Górnik Zabrze	17
4	(Poland) Ryszard Cyroń	Górnik Zabrze	14
4	(Poland) Ryszard Robakiewicz	LKS Łódź	14
6	(Poland) Marek Leśniak	Pogoń Szczecin	12
7	(Poland) Krzysztof Baran	Górnik Zabrze	11
7	(Poland) Jacek Bayer	Jagiellonia Białystok	11
9	(Poland) Jerzy Kruszczyński	Lech Poznań	10
9	(Poland) Bogusław Pachelski	Lech Poznań	10

== Attendances ==
No.	Club	Average
1	Jagiellonia Białystok	26,133
2	Górnik Zabrze	15,133
3	Lech Poznań	11,467
4	Śląsk Wrocław	11,333
5	ŁKS	11,000
6	Legia Warszawa	10,733
7	Stal Stalowa Wola	10,600
8	Lechia Gdansk	10,067
9	Katowice	8,467
10	Zagłębie Lubin	7,867
11	Pogoń Szczecin	7,800
12	Widzew Łódź	7,233
13	Bałtyk Gdynia	6,000
14	Górnik Wałbrzych	5,167
15	Olimpia Poznań	4,233
16	Szombierki Bytom	4,200
