= Odra Wodzisław Śląski =

- Full name: Wodzisławskie Towarzystwo Sportowe Odra Wodzisław Śląski
- Founded: 1922; 103 years ago 5 August 2025; 2 months ago (refounded as WTS Odra)
- Ground: Stadion MOSiR
- Capacity: 7,400
- President: Mariusz Adamczyk
- Manager: Wiesław Herda
- League: Klasa B Rybnik II
- 2024–25: IV liga Silesia II, 15th of 19 (relegated after play-offs)
- Website: http://www.odra.wodzislaw.pl/
Home colours	Away colours

Odra Wodzisław Śląski (Polish pronunciation: [ˈɔdra vɔˈd͡ʑiswaf 'śląskJi]), is a Polish football club based in Wodzisław Śląski, Poland.

The club played in the top flight between 1996 and 2010, appearing in the Intertoto Cup thrice and UEFA Cup once. They currently compete in the Rybnik II group of the Klasa B, the lowest level of the national football league system.

== History ==
The club was established in 1922 as Odra Wodzisław, then changed its name several times. After World War II, and until 1963, the club was linked closely to the Polish State Railways (PKP), so the club bore the nickname Kolejarz, which means The Railwaymen. From 1963 until 1974, the club took the name Górnik (miner), as the club is based in Upper Silesia, known for its coal-mining industry. Then, the club reverted to its traditional name, Odra, after the Oder River).

After several decades in the second and third tiers of the league system, Odra were promoted to the Polish Ekstraklasa for the first time in 1996. The team continued to develop over the following years, achieving 3rd place in their first season at this level before settling into mid-table placings over the following decade. From 2007, however, league positions worsened until the club was finally relegated to the I liga in 2010. In spite of this, Odra did manage to reach the final of the Ekstraklasa Cup in 2009, losing to regional rivals Śląsk Wrocław. During the 2010–11 season, Odra underwent severe financial difficulties, often struggling to raise enough money to travel to away fixtures. This affected on-field performance and a second successive relegation followed. The summer of 2011 saw the Odra board declare themselves bankrupt and dissolve the club, with fans reforming as Klub Piłkarski Odra 1922 Wodzisław. This new club joined the lowest rung of the Polish league ladder for the 2011–12 season.

== Stadium ==
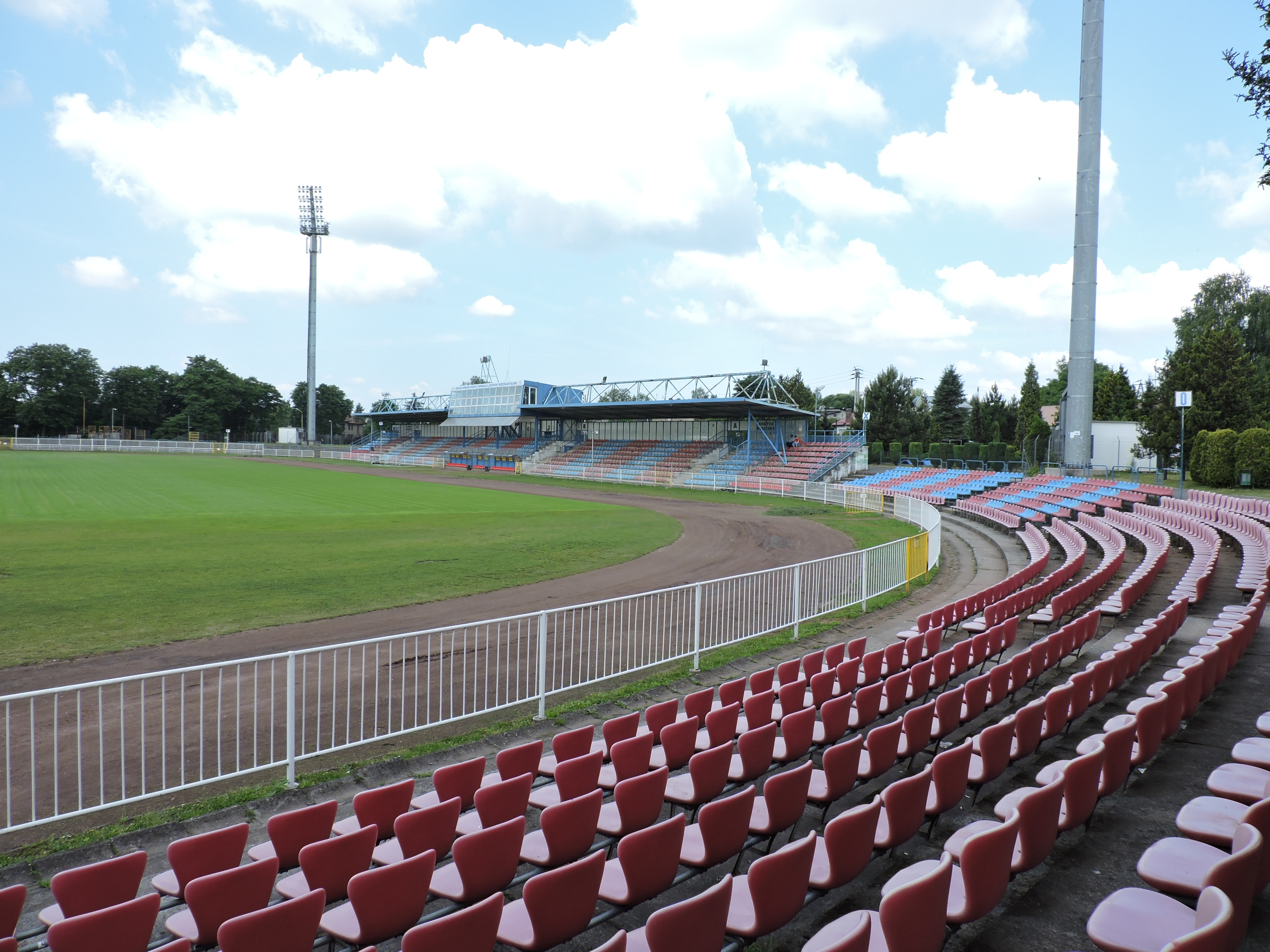
Stadion MOSiR (Wodzisław Śląski)

Odra hosts their games at a multi-purpose MOSiR Stadium, with a capacity of 7,400 people.

== Honours ==
- Ekstraklasa
  - Third place: 1996–97
- Polish Cup
  - Semi-finalist: 1996–97
- Ekstraklasa Cup
  - Runners-up: 2008–09
  - Semi-finalist: 1999–2000

== Odra in European Cups ==
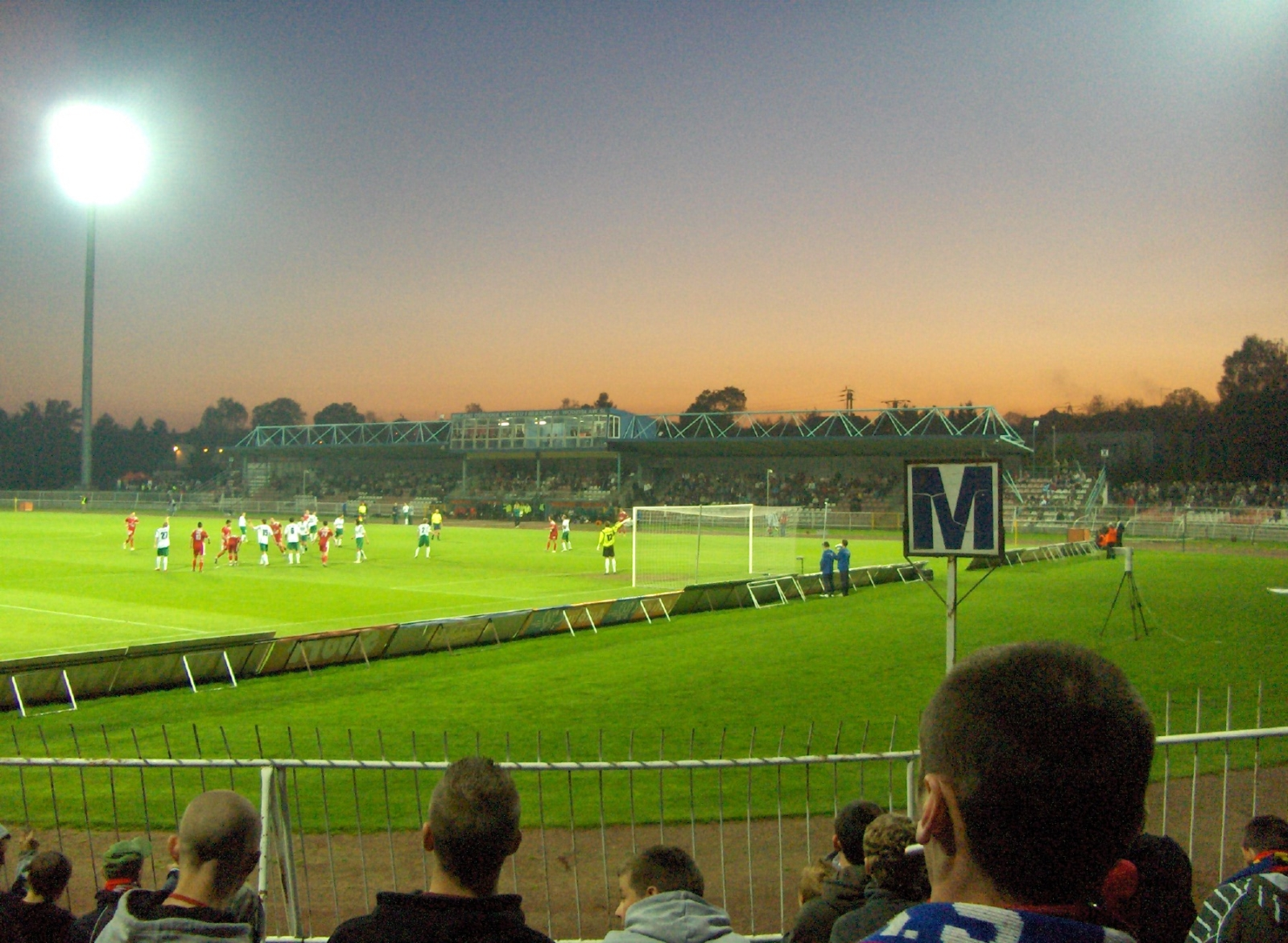
Match Odra vs Dyskobolia May 2008 in Wodzisław Śląski.

Season	Competition	Round		Club	Score
1997	Intertoto Cup	GR	(Romania)	Rapid București	2–4
			(France)	Olympique Lyonnais	2–5
			(Slovakia)	MŠK Žilina	0–0
			(Austria)	Austria Wien	5–1
1997/98	UEFA Cup	1Q	(North Macedonia)	Pobeda	3–0, 1–2
		2Q	(Russia)	Rotor Volgograd	0–2, 3–4
2003	Intertoto Cup	1R	(Republic of Ireland)	Shamrock Rovers	1–2, 0–1
2004	Intertoto Cup	1R	(Belarus)	Dinamo Minsk	1–0, 0–2

== Notable coaches ==
- Waldemar Fornalik
- Stanisław Oślizło
- Franciszek Smuda
- Ryszard Wieczorek
- Jerzy Wyrobek
- Jacek Zieliński

== See also ==
- Football in Poland
- List of football teams
- Champions' Cup/League
- UEFA Cup
