= Górnik Zabrze =

Association football club in Zabrze, Poland

Coordinates: 50°17′47″N 18°46′7″E

- Full name: Górnik Zabrze Spółka Akcyjna
- Nicknames: Trójkolorowi (The Tri-Colours), Górnicy (The Miners)
- Founded: 14 December 1948; 77 years ago
- Ground: Arena Zabrze
- Capacity: 28,499
- Owner: LP Holding GmBH (majority)
- Chairman: Michał Siara
- Manager: Michal Gašparík
- League: Ekstraklasa
- 2025–26: Ekstraklasa, 2nd of 18
- Website: www.gornikzabrze.pl
Home colours	Away colours

Górnik Zabrze Spółka Akcyjna, commonly referred to as Górnik Zabrze (Polish pronunciation: [ˈɡurɲiɡ ˈzabʐɛ]), is a Polish football club from Zabrze. Górnik is one of the most successful Polish football clubs in history, winning the second-most Polish Championship titles together with Ruch Chorzów. The club was a dominant force in the 1960s and 1980s. Górnik holds the record for winning the most consecutive Polish Championship titles (5) and Polish Cup titles (5). In addition, the club was 1969–70 Cup Winners' Cup runners-up.

They currently compete in the Ekstraklasa, the top tier of the national football league system. The club plays in a white or dark blue-red kit, and is based at the Arena Zabrze. Their main local rival is Ruch Chorzów.

== History ==
=== First years ===
The club was founded in 1948 after several smaller sports associations – KS Zjednoczenie, KS Pogoń, KS Skra, and KS Concordia – were merged into a single organization, on the initiative of Julian Gajdzicki, a former deportee to Siberia and a soldier of the Polish Anders' Army during the Second World War. The club took the name "Górnik", the Polish word for "Miner", reflecting the fact that Zabrze was an important coal-mining centre. It was a multi-sports club with several departments, including athletics, swimming and boxing, however, football remained the leading department.

In 1949, Górnik has entered the regional Klasa A of Opole Silesia (third tier) replacing Pogoń Zabrze. In 1950 the club was promoted to the Polish Second Division. Their first game in the second tier was against Skra Częstochowa, and was witnessed by 20,000 fans, with Górnik winning 5–1. The whole season was very successful and Górnik finished second overall, behind Górnik Wałbrzych. In November 1951, Górnik played their first friendly match against a foreign club, Dinamo Tbilisi.

The club was promoted to the top division in 1955. In their first game in the top flight Górnik beat local rivals Ruch Chorzów 3–1, with 25,000 in attendance; the club finished the season in sixth place.

=== First successes ===
In 1957, just a year after promotion, Górnik won its first championship of Poland. The team, with star, Ernest Pohl, was third in 1958, to regain the crown in 1959 and 1961, together with such players as Stanisław Oślizło and Hubert Kostka. In 1961 Górnik for the first time appeared in European Cups, losing in the first round to Tottenham Hotspur. In the 1962 season, Górnik set its record victory in a league match, beating Cracovia 9–0, a result matched in the 2002–03 season in a game against Pogoń Szczecin.

=== Golden years ===
The next championship, won in 1963, marked the beginning of an unusual streak of five consecutive titles (1963, 64, 65, 66 and 67), which is a Polish record, followed by five consecutive Polish Cup wins (1968, 1969, 1970, 1971 and 1972), also a Polish record, and two more Polish Championships in 1971 and 1972. Between 1957 and 1972, Górnik set a Polish record of finishing in the top three of the league for fifteen consecutive seasons.

Two Górnik players, Włodzimierz Lubański and Zygfryd Szołtysik, were ranked in the 1967 Ballon d'Or plebiscite, as the first Poles ever to feature in a Ballon d'Or poll. Lubański was ranked in the plebiscite three more times, reaching a high of seventh place in 1972. Jerzy Gorgoń was ranked 15th in the 1974 Ballon d'Or plebiscite, as the only Polish defender to date.

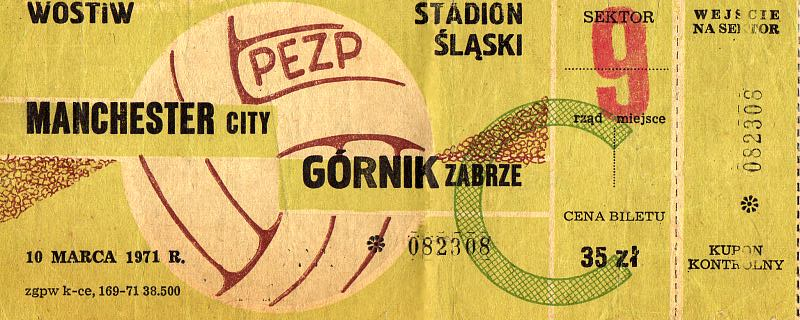
Ticket to a match against Manchester City in the 1970–71 European Cup Winners' Cup

Górnik's biggest success in European football took place in 1970 (even though in Poland the team was second, after Legia Warsaw). In the UEFA Cup Winners Cup, Gornik beat all their opponents – Olympiacos, Rangers, Levski Sofia and AS Roma, reaching the final, which took place in Vienna. There, Manchester City turned out to be the better team, winning 2–1. The following season Górnik would once again play Manchester City, with the 1970 final being repeated this time in the quarter-final.

=== Late 1970s and early 1980s ===
During the mid-1970s Górnik form deteriorated and in late spring of 1978, the team was relegated to the Second Division. However, it returned after one year and in games of 1979–80, Zabrze's side finished sixth. In 1984, after purchasing of a group of talented players (Ryszard Komornicki, Waldemar Matysik, Eugeniusz Cebrat, Andrzej Zgutczyński, Tadeusz Dolny, Andrzej Pałasz), Górnik finished fourth, which was a sign of better times.

=== Successes of other departments ===
In 1955, Jerzy Chromik, long-distance runner from Górnik Zabrze, became the first Polish athlete after World War II to set a new world record. Several track and field athletes from Górnik Zabrze have won Olympic medals, i.e. Halina Górecka and Tadeusz Ślusarski won gold in 1964 and 1976, respectively, and Zbigniew Jaremski, Jerzy Pietrzyk and Zenon Licznerski won silver—the former two together in 1976, and the latter in 1980. Up until the 1980s, athletes from the swimming, diving, weightlifting and wrestling departments of Górnik Zabrze won medals at the Polish national championships.

=== Late 1980s until now ===
Between 1985 and 1988, Górnik again marked a magnificent streak, with four consecutive championships. Zabrze's side also played versus renowned European powerhouses, such as Bayern Munich, Anderlecht, Hamburger SV, Juventus and Real Madrid.

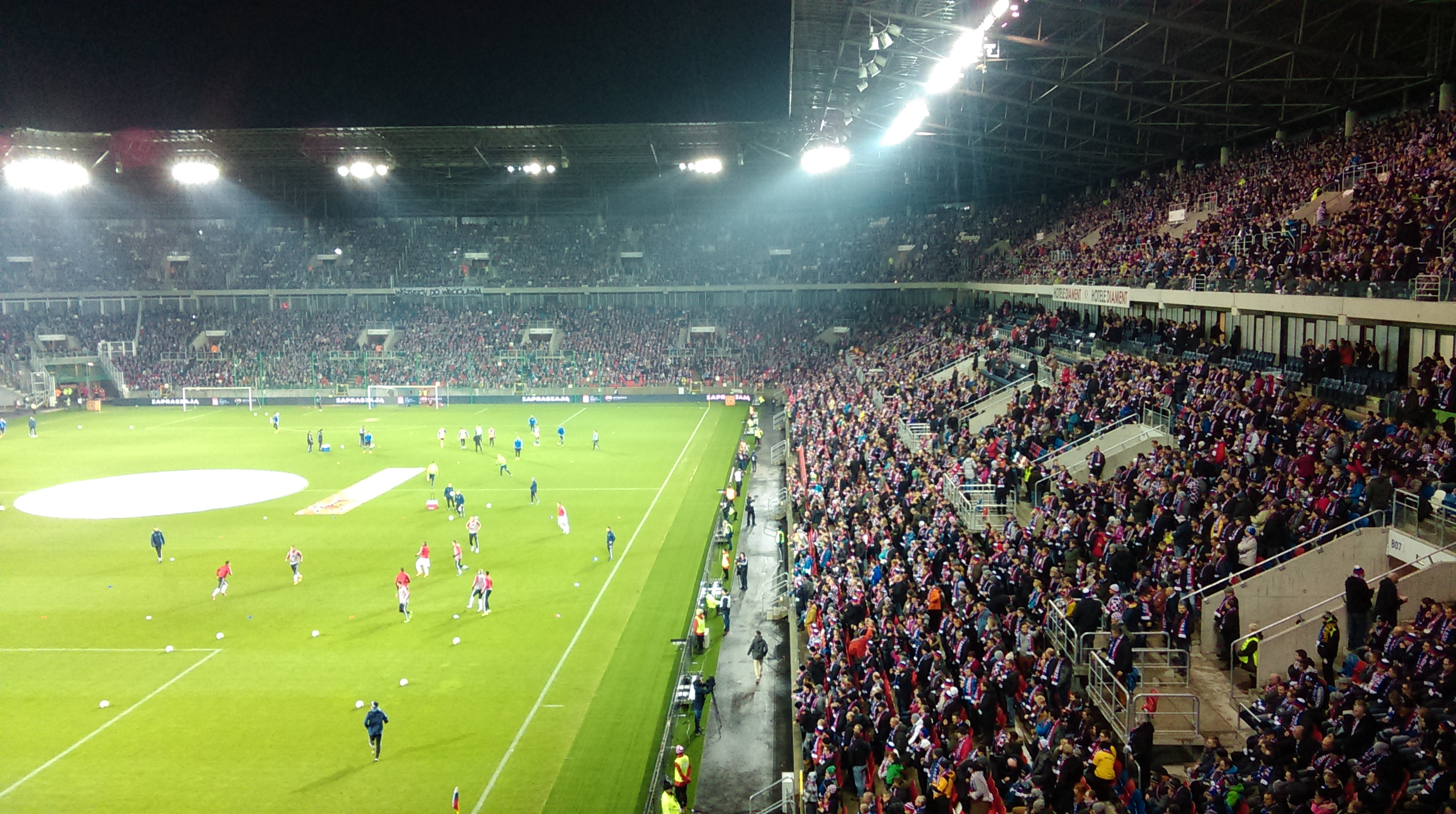
Arena Zabrze

In 1994, Górnik again competed for the title, and with players as Jerzy Brzęczek, Grzegorz Mielcarski, Tomasz Wałdoch, hopes were high. Before the last round of the league, the standings at the top saw Legia with 47 points and Górnik with 45. Since the two teams were to face each other in Warsaw, Górnik still had a chance to win the title. However, the game ended in a 1–1 tie, which gave the title to Legia. Before Legia scored the championship-winning equaliser, the referee of the match Stanisław Redziński sent off three Górnik players in quick succession. It was the last match of Redziński's refereeing career.

In the spring of 2007, Górnik acquired a new sponsor – a German insurance company Allianz. However, after finishing 16th in the Ekstraklasa in the 2008–09 season, the club was relegated to the I liga, the second level of Polish football. In June 2010, the club earned promotion back to the Ekstraklasa for the 2010–11 season. Since then, Górnik has promoted a number of players to the Poland national team and transferred several players to stronger leagues, including Arkadiusz Milik, Łukasz Skorupski, Szymon Żurkowski and Paweł Bochniewicz.

In 2016, the Sports Department was established at the Municipal Museum in Zabrze, where most of the exposition is devoted to Górnik Zabrze. In 2022, the women's section of Górnik Zabrze was established through the merger with the previously separate women's club, KKS Zabrze.

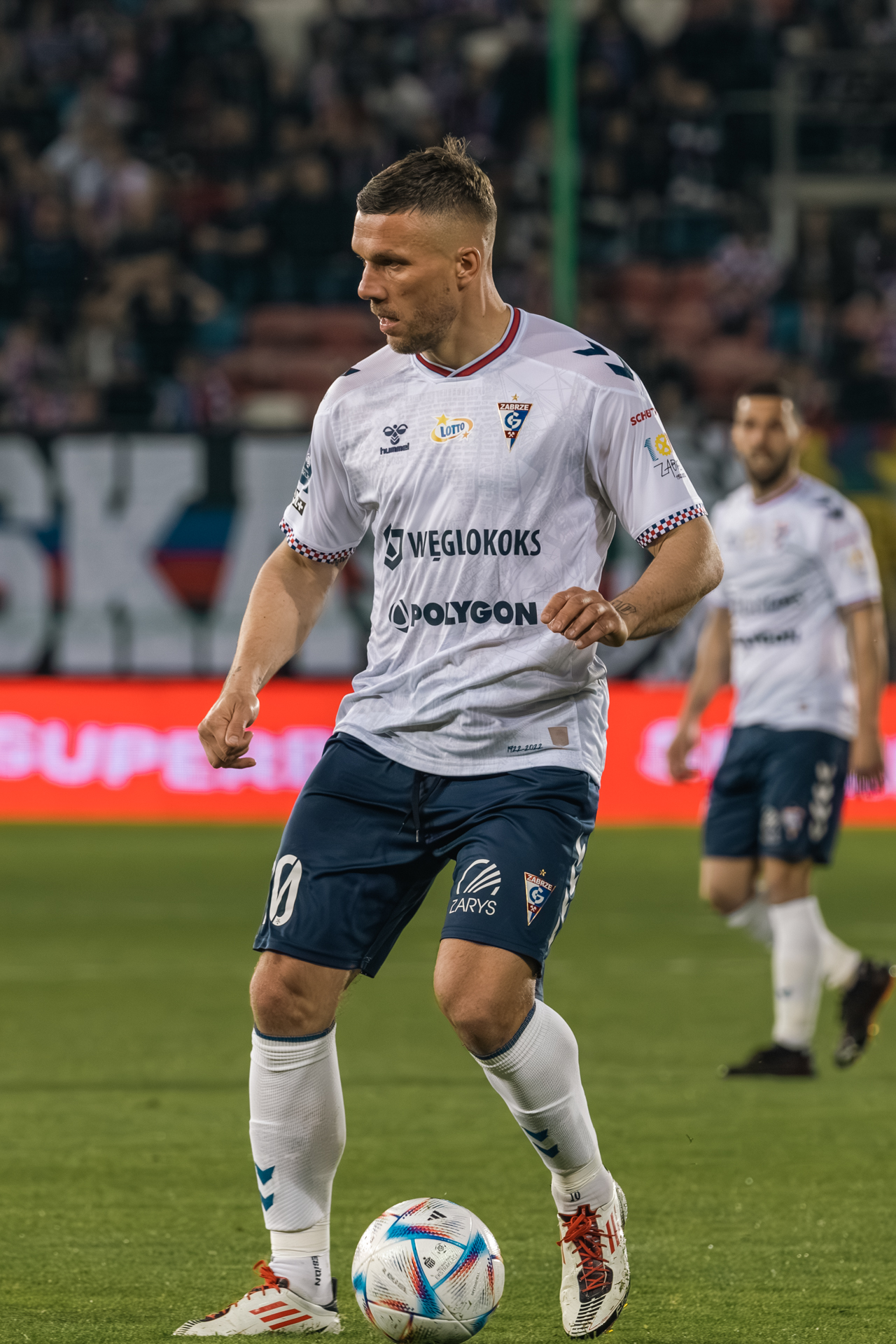
Lukas Podolski as a Górnik Zabrze player in 2023

In the 2025–26 season, Górnik won the Polish Cup, ending a 38-year trophy drought. On 21 May 2026, having acquired the remaining shares owned by Allianz a year prior, Lukas Podolski became Górnik's majority owner after purchasing 86% of the club's shares from the Zabrze local government.

== Honours ==
=== League ===
- Ekstraklasa
  - Champions (14): 1957, 1959, 1961, 1962–63, 1963–64, 1964–65, 1965–66, 1966–67, 1970–71, 1971–72, 1984–85, 1985–86, 1986–87, 1987–88
  - Runners-up (5): 1962, 1968–69, 1973–74, 1990–91, 2025–26

=== Cup ===
- Polish Cup
  - Winners (7): 1964–65, 1967–68, 1968–69, 1969–70, 1970–71, 1971–72, 2025–26
  - Runners-up (7): 1955–56, 1956–57, 1961–62, 1965–66, 1985–86, 1991–92, 2000–01
- Polish League Cup
  - Winners (1): 1978
- Polish Super Cup
  - Winners (1): 1988

=== Europe ===
- European Cup
  - Quarter-finalists: 1967–68
- UEFA Cup Winners' Cup
  - Runners-up: 1969–70

=== Youth teams ===
- Polish U-19 Championship
  - Champions: 1967, 1989, 2020
  - Runners-up: 1985, 2001, 2011
  - Third place: 2015
- Polish U-17 Championship
  - Champions: 1992, 1996, 2023
  - Runners-up: 2014

== League history ==
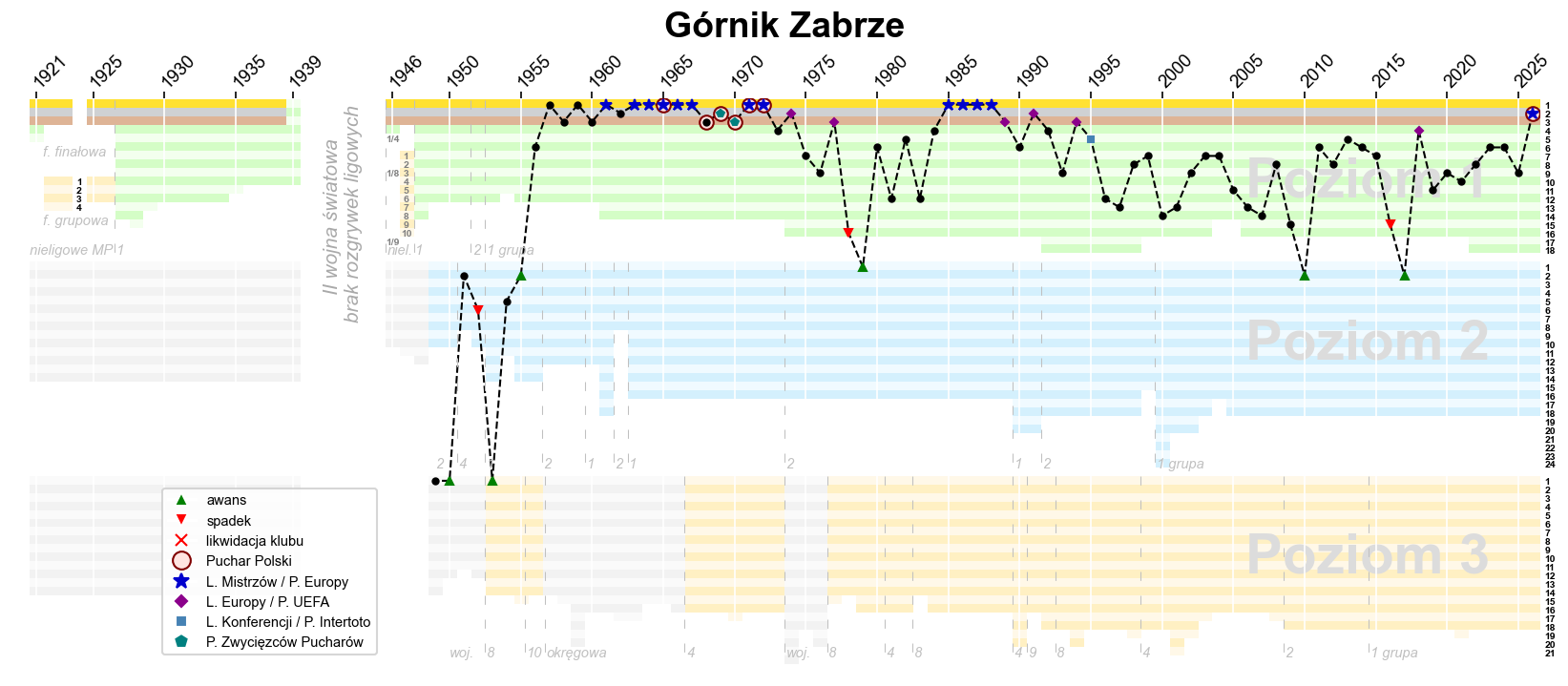
Chart of yearly table positions of Górnik in the Polish league system

Tier	Seasons	First	Last	Promotions	Relegations	Most consecutive seasons
Ekstraklasa (tier 1)	68	1956	2025–26	▲23 times to Europe	▼3	30 (1979–2009)
I liga (tier 2)	7	1951	2016–17	▲4	▼1	2
II liga (tier 3)	3	1948–49	1953	▲2	never	2

== Górnik in Europe ==
Season	Competition	Round		Club	Score
1961–62	European Cup	Q	(England)	Tottenham Hotspur	4–2, 1–8
1963–64	European Cup	Q	(Austria)	Austria Wien	1–0, 0–1, 2–1
1963–64	European Cup	1R	(Czechoslovakia)	Dukla Prague	2–0, 1–4
1964–65	European Cup	Q	(Czechoslovakia)	Dukla Prague	1–4, 3–0, 0–0
1965–66	European Cup	Q	(Austria)	LASK Linz	3–1, 2–1
1965–66	European Cup	1R	(Czechoslovakia)	Sparta Prague	0–3, 1–0
1966–67	European Cup	1R	(East Germany)	Vorwärts Berlin	2–1, 1–2, 3–1
1966–67	European Cup	2R	(Bulgaria)	CSKA Sofia	0–4, 3–0
1967–68	European Cup	1R	(Sweden)	Djurgårdens IF	3–0, 1–0
1967–68	European Cup	2R	(Soviet Union)	Dynamo Kyiv	2–1, 1–1
1967–68	European Cup	1/4F	(England)	Manchester United	0–2, 1–0
1968–69	European Cup Winners' Cup	1R	(Soviet Union)	Dynamo Moscow	withdrawal
1969–70	European Cup Winners' Cup	1R	(Greece)	Olympiacos	2–2, 5–0
1969–70	European Cup Winners' Cup	2R	(Scotland)	Rangers	3–1, 3–1
1969–70	European Cup Winners' Cup	1/4F	(Bulgaria)	Levski-Spartak	2–3, 2–1
1969–70	European Cup Winners' Cup	1/2F	(Italy)	Roma	1–1, 2–2, 1–1
1969–70	European Cup Winners' Cup	F	(England)	Manchester City	1–2
1970–71	European Cup Winners' Cup	1R	(Denmark)	Aalborg BK	1–0, 8–1
1970–71	European Cup Winners' Cup	2R	(Turkey)	Göztepe	1–0, 3–0
1970–71	European Cup Winners' Cup	1/4F	(England)	Manchester City	2–0, 0–2, 1–3
1971–72	European Cup	1R	(France)	Marseille	1–2, 1–1
1972–73	European Cup	1R	(Malta)	Sliema Wanderers	5–0, 5–0
1972–73	European Cup	2R	(Soviet Union)	Dynamo Kyiv	0–2, 2–1
1974–75	UEFA Cup	1R	(Socialist Federal Republic of Yugoslavia)	Partizan	2–2, 0–3
1977–78	UEFA Cup	1R	(Finland)	Haka	5–3, 0–0
1977–78	UEFA Cup	2R	(England)	Aston Villa	0–2, 1–1
1985–86	European Cup	1R	(Germany)	Bayern Munich	1–2, 1–4
1986–87	European Cup	1R	(Belgium)	Anderlecht	0–2, 1–1
1987–88	European Cup	1R	(Greece)	Olympiacos	1–1, 2–1
1987–88	European Cup	2R	(Scotland)	Rangers	1–3, 1–1
1988–89	European Cup	1R	(Luxembourg)	Jeunesse Esch	3–0, 4–1
1988–89	European Cup	2R	(Spain)	Real Madrid	0–1, 2–3
1989–90	UEFA Cup	1R	(Italy)	Juventus	0–1, 2–4
1991–92	UEFA Cup	1R	(Germany)	Hamburger SV	1–1, 0–3
1994–95	UEFA Cup	Q	(Republic of Ireland)	Shamrock Rovers	7–0, 1–0
1994–95	UEFA Cup	1R	(Austria)	Admira Wacker	2–5, 1–1
1995	Intertoto Cup	GR	(Denmark)	AGF	1–4
1995	Intertoto Cup	GR	(Switzerland)	Basel	1–2
1995	Intertoto Cup	GR	(England)	Sheffield Wednesday	2–3
1995	Intertoto Cup	GR	(Germany)	Karlsruher SC	1–6
2018–19	UEFA Europa League	1Q	(Moldova)	Zaria Bălți	1–0, 1–1
2018–19	UEFA Europa League	2Q	(Slovakia)	AS Trenčín	0–1, 1−4
2026–27	UEFA Champions League	2Q	(Turkey)	Fenerbahçe	0–1, 1–1
2026–27	UEFA Europa League	3Q	(Hungary)	Ferencváros	0–1, 1–1
2026–27	UEFA Conference League	PO	(France)	AS Monaco	2–3, 1−4

=== Best results in European competitions ===
Season	Achievement	Notes
European Cup / UEFA Champions League
1968	Quarter-Final	lost to (England) Manchester United 0–2 in Manchester, 1–0 in Chorzów
UEFA Cup Winners' Cup
1970	Final	lost to (England) Manchester City 1–2 in Vienna
1971	Quarter-Final	lost to (England) Manchester City 2–0 in Chorzów, 0–2 in Manchester, 1–3 in Copenhagen

== Players ==
=== Current squad ===
As of 18 September 2026

Note: Flags indicate national team as defined under FIFA eligibility rules; some limited exceptions apply. Players may hold more than one non-FIFA nationality.

No.	Pos.	Nation	Player
1	GK	GER	Philipp Schulze
2	DF	POL	Patryk Warczak
4	DF	POL	Paweł Bochniewicz
6	MF	DEN	Malthe Højholt
7	FW	CGO	Yvan Ikia Dimi
8	MF	POR	Paulo Bernardo (on loan from Celtic)
9	FW	MTQ	Janis Antiste (on loan from Sassuolo)
11	FW	SVK	Erik Prekop
14	MF	POL	Jarosław Kubicki
15	MF	POL	Marcel Kalemba
18	MF	CZE	Lukáš Sadílek
19	FW	DOM	Peter González
20	DF	ESP	Josema
21	DF	CZE	Ondřej Zmrzlý

No.	Pos.	Nation	Player
23	FW	NOR	Sondre Liseth
24	MF	POL	Ksawery Semik
26	DF	POL	Rafał Janicki
27	MF	SWE	Zeidane Inoussa (on loan from Swansea City)
28	MF	FRA	Bastien Donio
29	GK	POL	Wiktor Kania
33	MF	UKR	Maksym Khlan
34	FW	CRO	Bruno Durdov
61	DF	CZE	Michal Sáček
64	DF	SLO	Erik Janža (captain)
66	MF	USA	Maximilian Dietz
82	MF	POL	Kacper Urbański
92	GK	POL	Piotr Pietryga
99	GK	POL	Tomasz Loska

=== Out on loan ===
Note: Flags indicate national team as defined under FIFA eligibility rules; some limited exceptions apply. Players may hold more than one non-FIFA nationality.

No.	Pos.	Nation	Player
3	DF	POL	Michał Synoś (at Bruk-Bet Termalica Nieciecza until 30 June 2027)
5	DF	POL	Kryspin Szcześniak (at Radomiak Radom until 30 June 2027)
15	MF	GER	Roberto Massimo (at Wehen Wiesbaden until 30 June 2027)
17	MF	POL	Kamil Lukoszek (at Motor Lublin until 30 June 2027)
22	MF	NGR	Abbati Abdullahi (at MFK Skalica until 30 June 2027)
31	GK	POL	Mateusz Jeleń (at Polonia Warsaw until 30 June 2027)
36	MF	POL	Michał Rakoczy (at Podbeskidzie Bielsko-Biała until 30 June 2027)
41	DF	POL	Dawid Mazurek (at Rekord Bielsko-Biała until 30 June 2027)

No.	Pos.	Nation	Player
55	DF	POL	Maksymilian Pingot (at Odra Opole until 30 June 2027)
77	FW	BUL	Borislav Rupanov (at União Leiria until 30 June 2027)
79	MF	KOR	Goh Young-jun (at Gangwon FC until 31 December 2026)
—	MF	POL	Natan Dzięgielewski (at Arka Gdynia until 30 June 2027)
—	MF	CGO	Gédéon Nongo (at Stal Stalowa Wola until 30 June 2027)
—	GK	POL	Kamil Soberka (at Stal Stalowa Wola until 30 June 2027)
—	DF	POL	Dominik Szala (at Śląsk Wrocław until 30 June 2027)

=== Notable former players ===
- (Poland) Jan Banaś
- (Poland) Marek Bęben
- (Poland) Piotr Brożek
- (Poland) Jerzy Brzęczek
- (Poland) Ryszard Cyroń
- (Poland) Jerzy Gorgoń
- (Poland) Tomasz Hajto
- (Poland) Andrzej Iwan
- (Poland) Piotr Jegor
- (Poland) Ireneusz Jeleń
- (Poland) Damian Kądzior
- (Poland) Ryszard Komornicki
- (Poland) Dariusz Koseła
- (Poland) Kamil Kosowski
- (Poland) Hubert Kostka
- (Poland) Marek Koźmiński
- (Poland) Ryszard Kraus
- (Poland) Rafał Kurzawa
- (Poland) Marcin Kuźba
- (Poland) Włodzimierz Lubański
- (Poland) Arkadiusz Milik
- (Poland) Kazimierz Moskal
- (Poland) Andrzej Niedzielan
- (Poland) Paweł Olkowski
- (Poland) Stanisław Oślizło
- (Poland) Michał Pazdan
- (Poland) Rafał Pietrzak
- (Poland) Ernest Pohl
- (Poland) Michał Probierz
- (Poland) Grzegorz Sandomierski
- (Poland) Łukasz Skorupski
- (Poland) Ryszard Staniek
- (Poland) Andrzej Szarmach
- (Poland) Marek Szemoński
- (Poland) Zygfryd Szołtysik
- (Poland) Jan Urban
- (Poland) Tomasz Wałdoch
- (Poland) Józef Wandzik
- (Poland) Robert Warzycha
- (Poland) Mateusz Wieteska
- (Poland) Przemysław Wiśniewski
- (Poland) Tomasz Zahorski
- (Poland) Andrzej Zgutczyński
- (Poland) Szymon Żurkowski
- (Albania) Enkeleid Dobi
- (Bosnia and Herzegovina) Ensar Arifović
- (Bosnia and Herzegovina) Armin Ćerimagić
- (Bosnia and Herzegovina) Boris Pandža
- (Bosnia and Herzegovina) Vladimir Sladojević
- (Bulgaria) Dimitar Makriev
- (Burkina Faso) Prejuce Nakoulma
- (Croatia) Ivica Križanac
- (Curaçao) Anthony van den Hurk
- (Czech Republic) Patrik Hellebrand
- (Estonia) Sergei Mošnikov
- (Finland) Richard Jensen
- (Georgia (country)) Valerian Gvilia
- (Germany) Michał Bemben
- (Germany) Lukas Podolski
- (Ghana) Richmond Boakye
- (Greece) Giorgos Giakoumakis
- (Guinea) José Kanté
- (Iceland) Adam Örn Arnarson
- (Japan) Kanji Okunuki
- (Latvia) Mārcis Ošs
- (Latvia) Andrejs Prohorenkovs
- (Latvia) Māris Smirnovs
- (North Macedonia) Aco Stojkov
- (Slovakia) Róbert Jež
- (Slovakia) Erik Jirka
- (Slovakia) Matúš Kmeť
- (Slovakia) Roman Procházka
- (Slovenia) Blaž Vrhovec
- (Slovenia) Luka Zahović
- (Spain) Igor Angulo
- (Sweden) Emil Bergström
- (Zimbabwe) Dickson Choto
- (Zimbabwe) Shingayi Kaondera

== Managers ==
- (Poland) Ginter Pawelczyk (1948–49)
- (Poland) Teodor Meiser (1949)
- (Poland) Karol Luks (1949–50)
- (Poland) Gerard Wodarz (1950–54)
- (Poland) Augustyn Dziwisz (1954–56)
- (Poland) Paweł Mościński (1956)
- (Poland) Hubert Skolik (1957)
- (Hungary) Zoltán Opata (1957–58)
- (Poland) Hubert Skolik (1958–59)
- (Hungary) Janos Steiner (1959)
- (Poland) Feliks Karolek (1960)
- (Czechoslovakia) Vilém Lugr (1960)
- (Poland) Augustyn Dziwisz (1 July 1960 – 30 June 1962)
- (Poland) Feliks Karolek (1962)
- (Poland) Ewald Cebula (1962–63)
- (Poland) Feliks Karolek (1963)
- (Poland) Hubert Skolik (1963)
- (Poland) Feliks Karolek (1964)
- (Poland) Hubert Skolik (1964)
- (Hungary) Ferenc Farsang (1964–65)
- (Poland) Władysław Giergiel (1 July 1965 – 30 June 1966)
- (Hungary) Géza Kalocsay (1 July 1966 – 30 June 1969)
- (Poland) Michał Matyas (1969–70)
- (Hungary) Ferenc Szusza (1970–71)
- (Poland) A. Brzeżańczyk (1 July 1971 – 30 April 1972)
- (Poland) Jan Kowalski (1972)
- (Hungary) Gyula Szücs (1972)
- (Poland) Jan Kowalski (1972–73)
- (Poland) Teodor Wieczorek (1973–75)
- (Poland) Andrzej Gajewski (1975–76)
- (Poland) Józef Trepka (1976)
- (Poland) Hubert Kostka (30 May 1976 – 5 December 1977)
- (Poland) Władysław Jan Żmuda (13 December 1977 – 24 May 1980)
- (Poland) Zdzisław Podedworny (1980–83)
- (Poland) Hubert Kostka (1 December 1983 – 30 May 1986)
- (Poland) Lesław Ćmikiewicz (1 June 1986 – 14 October 1986)
- (Poland) Antoni Piechniczek (15 October 1986 – 30 June 1987)
- (Poland) Marcin Bochynek (1 July 1987 – 30 June 1989)
- (Poland) Zdzisław Podedworny (1989)
- (Poland) Jan Kisiel (1989–90)
- (Poland) Jan Kowalski (1990–92)
- (Poland) Janusz Kowalik (1992)
- (Poland) Alojzy Łysk (1992–93)
- (Poland) Henryk Apostel (1 July 1993 – 31 December 1993)
- (Poland) Hubert Kostka (1 January 1994 – 22 May 1994)
- (Poland) Edward Lorens (23 May 1994 – 2 June 1995)
- (Poland) Stanisław Oślizło (1995)
- (Poland) Adam Michalski (1995–96)
- (Poland) Jan Kowalski (1996)
- (Poland) Jan Żurek (11 August 1996 – 11 September 1996)
- (Poland) Piotr Kocąb (1996)
- (Poland) Henryk Apostel (1 January 1997 – 10 November 1997)
- (Poland) Jan Kowalski (1997)
- (Poland) Jan Żurek (1 December 1997 – 15 March 2000)
- (Poland) Józef Dankowski (int.) (16 March 2000 – 19 March 2000)
- (Poland) Marcin Bochynek (20 March 2000 – 9 April 2000)
- (Poland) Mieczysław Broniszewski (10 April 2000 – 16 September 2000)
- (Poland) Józef Dankowski (17 September 2000 – 7 May 2001)
- (Poland) Marek Piotrowicz (2001)
- (Poland) Waldemar Fornalik (10 May 2001 – 31 October 2001)
- (Poland) Marek Piotrowicz (2 November 2001 – 31 December 2001)
- (Poland) Waldemar Fornalik (12 January 2002 – 4 April 2004)
- (Czech Republic) Verner Lička (5 April 2004 – 13 December 2004)
- (Poland) Edward Lorens (13 December 2004 – 3 February 2005)
- (Poland) Marek Wleciałowski (7 February 2005 – 31 October 2005)
- (Poland) Marek Motyka (4 November 2005 – 13 January 2006)
- (Poland) Ryszard Komornicki (13 January 2006 – 19 April 2006)
- (Poland) Przemysław Cecherz (int.) (19 April 2006 – 26 April 2006)
- (Poland) Marek Motyka (26 April 2006 – 12 December 2006)
- (Poland) Zdzisław Podedworny (2006–07)
- (Poland) Marek Motyka (13 March 2007 – 20 May 2007)
- (Poland) Marek Kostrzewa (2007)
- (Poland) Marek Piotrowicz (2007)
- (Poland) Ryszard Wieczorek (1 July 2007 – 10 September 2008)
- (Poland) Marcin Bochynek (int.) (2 September 2008 – 16 September 2008)
- (Poland) Henryk Kasperczak (16 September 2008 – 3 June 2009)
- (Poland) Ryszard Komornicki (18 June 2009 – 15 December 2009)
- (Poland) Adam Nawałka (1 January 2010 – 31 October 2013)
- (Poland) Bogdan Zając (int.) (1 November 2013 – 10 November 2013)
- (Poland) Ryszard Wieczorek (12 November 2013 – 9 March 2014)
- (Poland) Robert Warzycha (12 March 2014 – 30 June 2014)
- (Poland) Józef Dankowski (1 July 2014 – 30 June 2015)
- (Poland) Robert Warzycha (1 July 2015 – 13 August 2015)
- (Poland) Leszek Ojrzyński (13 August 2015 – 3 March 2016)
- (Poland) Jan Żurek (3 March 2016 – 2 June 2016)
- (Poland) Marcin Brosz (3 June 2016 – 27 May 2021)
- (Poland) Jan Urban (27 May 2021 – 15 June 2022)
- (Germany) Bartosch Gaul (23 June 2022 – 18 March 2023)
- (Poland) Jan Urban (18 March 2023 – 15 April 2025)
- (Poland) Piotr Gierczak (15 April 2025 – 30 June 2025)
- (Slovakia) Michal Gašparík (1 July 2025 – present)

== Supporters and rivalries ==
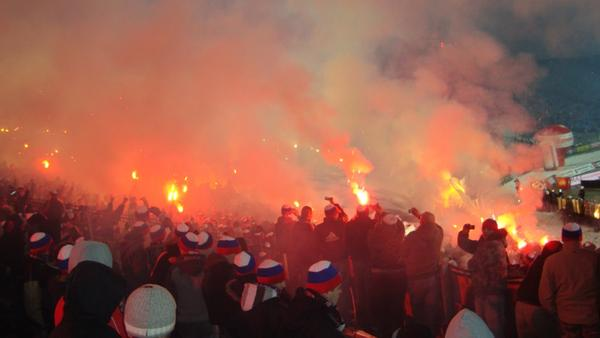
Górnik Zabrze supporters during the Great Silesian Derby.

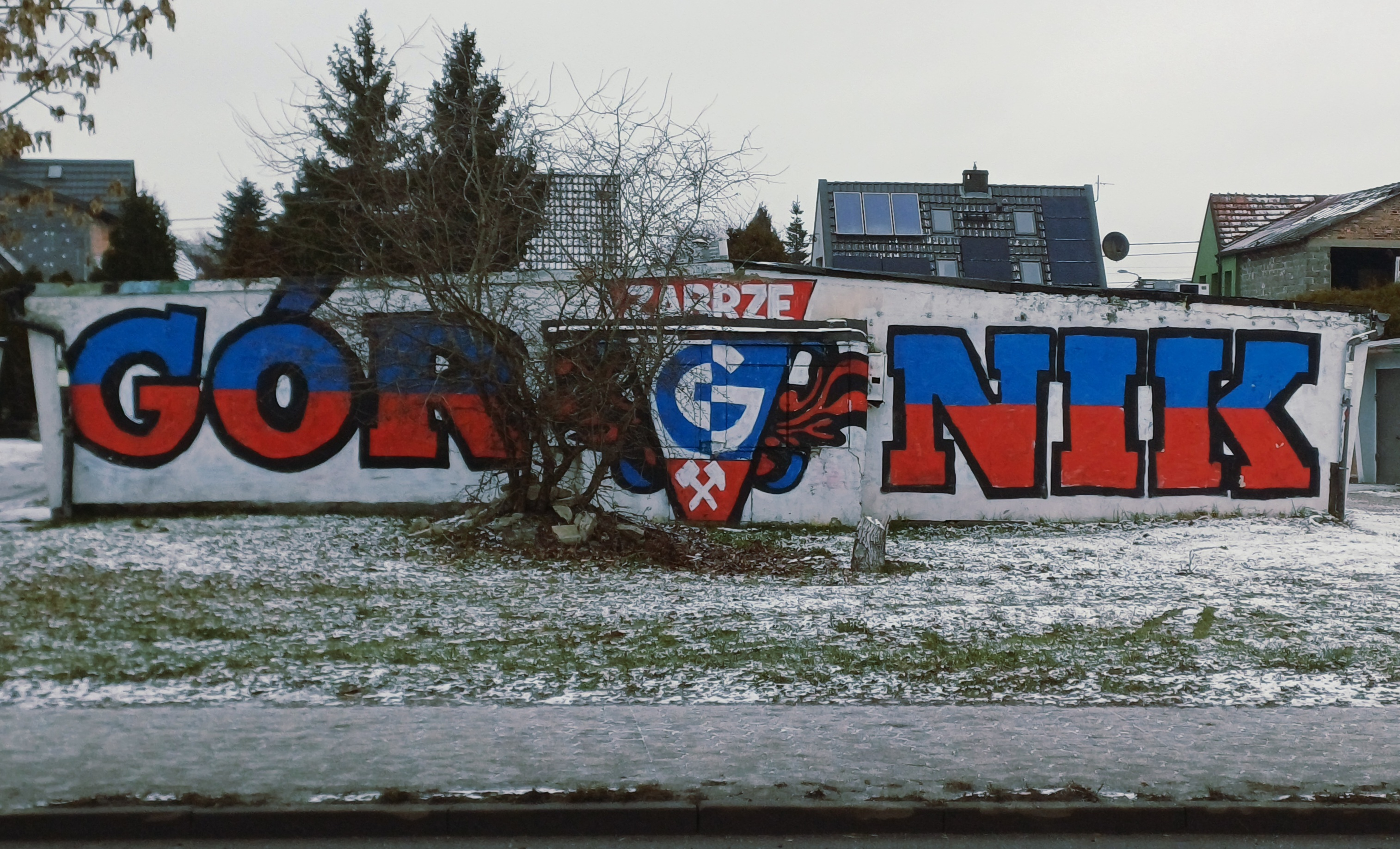
Graffiti on a wall in Zabrze.

Górnik Zabrze is believed to have one of the largest and most loyal fanbases in Poland, especially in the Katowice metropolitan area. In the 2016–17 season, Górnik Zabrze drew the highest average home attendance (10,636) of all second level Polish football clubs. They also drew the highest attendance in their league (20,987). After their comeback to the top flight in 2017, Górnik drew the highest average home attendance in Polish football, surpassing current top teams Lech Poznań and Legia Warsaw, with most league games being sold-out.

Górnik holds a long-standing rivalry with Upper Silesian side Ruch Chorzów, known as the Great Silesian Derby. Other main rivals are Piast Gliwice, Polonia Bytom, Legia Warsaw and Zagłębie Sosnowiec.

Torcida Zabrze is named after the ultras of Torcida Split, with whom they have friendly relations; together they are called United Torcida. They have also friendly relations with fans of Wisłoka Dębica and German club Schalke 04; the latter in past used to be a rival. Fans of Concordia Knurów, Naprzód Rydułtowy, Slavia Ruda Śląska and Czarni Pyskowice are also Górnik fan-clubs.

=== Notable supporters ===
Well-known supporters of Górnik Zabrze include Zbigniew Religa, pioneer in human heart transplantation in Poland, Adam Małysz, one of the most successful ski jumpers in history, Wojtek Wolski, former National Hockey League player, and international footballers Jerzy Dudek, Lukas Podolski and Ireneusz Jeleń.
