= Warmia Grajewo =

Polish football club

- Full name: Klub Sportowy; Warmia Grajewo
- Founded: 1924; 102 years ago
- Ground: Witold Terlecki Municipal Stadium
- Capacity: 1,740
- Chairman: Wojciech Dulgis
- Manager: Karol Salik
- League: IV liga Podlasie
- 2025–26: IV liga Podlasie, 2nd of 18
- Website: https://kswarmiagrajewo.pl

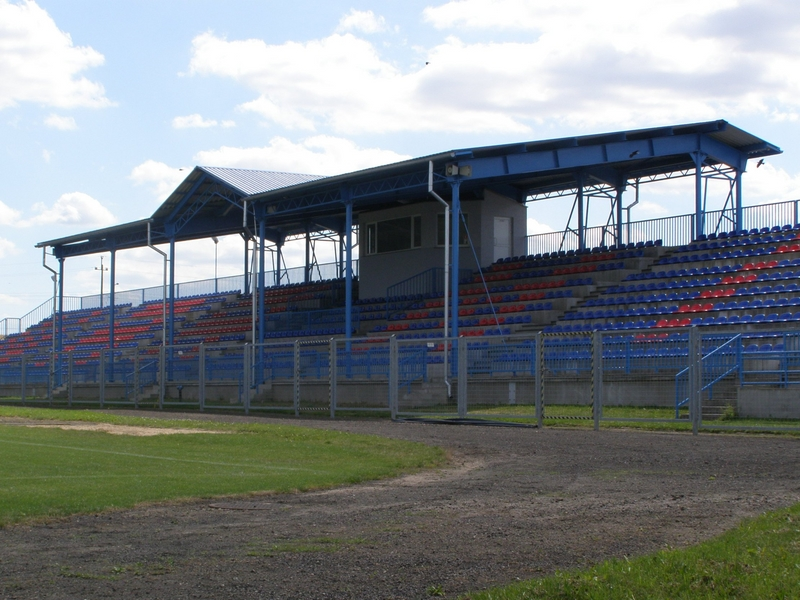
Ground: Stadion Miejski Witolda Terleckiego

Warmia Grajewo is a Polish football club, founded in 1924. It currently competes in the IV liga Podlasie, the fifth level of Polish football league system.

== Warmia in the 21st century ==
Season	League	Position	Points	Goals	Notes
2000–01	IV liga	2	63	87:35	
2001–02	IV liga	1	79	100:15	promotion
2002–03	III liga	8	44	46:31	
2003–04	III liga	5	48	33:23	
2004–05	III liga	12	40	29:36	degradation
2005–06	IV liga	1	65	80:29	promotion
2006–07	III liga	14	23	29:50	
2007–08	III liga	10	40	46:47	degradation
2008–09	III liga	8	39	45:32	
2009–10	III liga	6	46	40-30	
2010–11	III liga	5	46	44-38	
2011–12	III liga	4	54	44-24	
2012–13	III liga	?	?	?	

Legenda
Colours
3rd league level
4th league level
