= TS Koszarawa 1910 Żywiec =

Koszarawa Żywiec
- Full name: TS Koszarawa 1910 Żywiec
- Founded: 10 September 1910; 115 years ago
- Ground: TS Koszarawa Żywiec Stadium
- Capacity: 2,500
- Chairman: Janusz Wiwatowski
- Manager: vacant
- League: Klasa A Żywiec
- 2025–26: Klasa A Żywiec, 5th of 14
- Website: https://tskoszarawazywiec.pl

Koszarawa Żywiec is a Polish football team from Żywiec.

== History ==
The team was founded in 1910, in the southern Polish town of Żywiec, which at the time was under the control of Austria-Hungary. Among founders, there were such well-known people such as Edmund and Władysław Zyzak; Ludwik, Franciszek and Władysław Pantofliński; Leonard Rybarski; Otto Szmidt; Wiktor Dubowski and other local youths, passionate about football. Their first opponents were small clubs founded in those years, from Kraków, Lwów, and other towns.

In 1930, the club was promoted to local A-Class, which roughly is the equivalent of contemporary second division. They remained there for four years.

After World War II, Koszarawa suffered a steady decline. It was not until 2001 that the team gained promotion back to the fifth tier. They stayed there for a few years until they were promoted again in 2007, this time to the fourth tier. In their first season, they started brightly, but after the sale of top scorers Krzysztof Zaremba to local giants Podbeskidzie Bielsko-Biała and Krzysztof Bizacki to GKS Tychy, they failed to regain the same form they had had before, and finished in 11th place.

In 1949, the club was renamed Związkowiec after a merger with local side Soła Żywiec, but it was short lived as in 1950 Związkowiec was liquidated and the merger was undone, and the club returned to the name TS Koszarawa. In 1957, there was another merger with Sparta Żywiec, but the club retained its full identity and name.
