= 2008–09 Polish Cup =

Tournament details
- Country: Poland
- Teams: 65

Final positions
- Champions: Lech Poznań
- Runners-up: Ruch Chorzów

Tournament statistics
- Matches played: 70
- Goals scored: 194 (2.77 per match)
- Top goal scorer(s): Iliyan Mitsanski; Fabian Pańko (4 goals each)

The 2008–09 Polish Cup was the fifty-fifth season of the annual Polish cup competition. It began on July 30, 2008 with the extra preliminary round and ended on May 19, 2009 with the Final, played at Stadion Śląski, Chorzów. The winners qualified for the third qualifying round of the UEFA Europa League. Legia Warszawa were the defending champions.

== Extra preliminary round ==
Eight of the 32 teams which had qualified on regional levels competed in this round.

Team 1	Score	Team 2
30 July 2008
Pogoń Oleśnica	1–0 (a.e.t.)	Arka Nowa Sól
Chełmianka Chełm	2–3	KSZO Ostrowiec Świętokrzyski
Koszarawa Żywiec	0–1	Unia Tarnów
GKS Starocin	1–1 (a.e.t.) (6–7 p)	Sokół Aleksandrów Łódzki

== Preliminary round ==
The four winners of the extra preliminary round and the 24 remaining teams qualified through regional levels competed in this round.

Team 1	Score	Team 2
13 August 2008
OKS 1945 Olsztyn	0–3	Kotwica Kołobrzeg
Victoria Koronowo	0–1	Huragan Morąg
Omega Kleszczów II	2–2 (a.e.t.) (4–5 p)	Promień Opalenica
Górnik Łęczna	2–0	Warmia Grajewo
Pniówek Pawłowice Śląskie	2–1	Resovia Rzeszów
Przebój Wolbrom II	0–2	Sokół Aleksandrów Łódzki
Stal Sanok	3–1	Unia Tarnów
Bytovia Bytów	2–3 (a.e.t.)	Dąb Dębno
LZS Leśnica	2–1	KSZO Ostrowiec Świętokrzyski
Orzeł Ząbkowice Śląskie	0–2	Pogoń Oleśnica
Lechia Zielona Góra II	0–2	Nielba Wągrowiec
Naprzód Jędrzejów	1–1 (a.e.t.) (4–5 p)	Legia Warszawa II
Hutnik Warszawa	1–4	Zawisza Bydgoszcz
Supraślanka Supraśl	1–2	Lechia Gdańsk II

== Round 1 ==
The fourteen winners of the preliminary round, along with the eighteen teams from 2007–08 II Liga, competed in this round.

Team 1	Score	Team 2
26 August 2008
Zawisza Bydgoszcz	0–1	Kmita Zabierzów
27 August 2008
Kotwica Kołobrzeg	0–2	Arka Gdynia
Huragan Morąg	1–2 (a.e.t.)	Warta Poznań
Promień Opalenica	2–1	Pelikan Łowicz
Górnik Łęczna	5–1	Tur Turek
Pniówek Pawłowice Śląskie	1–3	Odra Opole
Sokół Aleksandrów Łódzki	1–1 (a.e.t.) (1–4 p)	Piast Gliwice
Stal Sanok	2–2 (a.e.t.) (5–4 p)	Podbeskidzie Bielsko-Biała
Dąb Dębno	0–3	Lechia Gdańsk
LZS Leśnica	1–2	GKS Jastrzębie-Zdrój
Pogoń Oleśnica	1–3	GKS Katowice
Nielba Wągrowiec	1–0	Śląsk Wrocław
Legia Warszawa II	0–3	Motor Lublin
Lechia Gdańsk II	3–0	Znicz Pruszków
Wisła Płock	8–0	ŁKS Łomża
No match
Stal Stalowa Wola	w/o	^{1}

Notes

- Note 1: The draw was conducted prior to the merger of Polonia Warsaw and Dyskobolia Grodzisk Wielkopolski. Upon completion of the merger, Stal Stalowa Wola, who were originally to play former II Liga side Polonia Warsaw, were awarded a walkover to the next round.

== Round 2 ==
The sixteen winners of Round 1, along with the sixteen teams from 2007–08 Ekstraklasa, competed in this round.

Team 1	Score	Team 2
23 September 2008
Stal Stalowa Wola	1–0	GKS Bełchatów
Nielba Wągrowiec	0–3	Polonia Warsaw
Górnik Łęczna	2–3 (a.e.t.)	Cracovia
GKS Katowice	3–4 (a.e.t.)	Górnik Zabrze
Odra Opole	2–0	Polonia Bytom
Wisła Płock	1–2 (a.e.t.)	Legia Warsaw
24 September 2008
Stal Sanok	1–0	Widzew Łódź
Motor Lublin	0–2	ŁKS Łódź
Promień Opalenica	1–0	Zagłębie Sosnowiec
Warta Poznań	0–2	Ruch Chorzów
Kmita Zabierzów	3–0	Korona Kielce
GKS Jastrzębie	3–4 (a.e.t.)	Zagłębie Lubin
Piast Gliwice	0–4	Lech Poznań
Lechia Gdańsk II	0–3	Wisła Kraków
Arka Gdynia	1–2	Odra Wodzisław Śląski
7 October 2008
Lechia Gdańsk	0–1	Jagiellonia Białystok

23 September 2008	Stal Stalowa Wola	1–0	GKS Bełchatów	Stalowa Wola
15:30 CEST (UTC+02:00)	Lebioda 10'			Stadium: Stadion MOSiR; Attendance: 1,800; Referee: Marcin Roguski (Warsaw)

23 September 2008	Nielba Wągrowiec	0–3	Polonia Warsaw	Wągrowiec
16:00 CEST (UTC+02:00)			Kazimierowski 56'; J. Lato 78'; Gajtkowski 80'	Stadium: Stadion OSiR; Attendance: 2,000; Referee: Dariusz Giejsztorewicz (Suwałki)

23 September 2008	Górnik Łęczna	2–3 (a.e.t.)	Cracovia	Łęczna
16:00 CEST (UTC+02:00)	Grzegorzewski 39' (pen.); Stefaniuk 65'		Pawlusiński 37' (pen.); Krzywicki 46'; Moskała 108'	Stadium: Stadion Górnika; Attendance: no attendance allowed Referee: Mirosław Górecki (Katowice)

23 September 2008	GKS Katowice	3–4 (a.e.t.)	Górnik Zabrze	Katowice
16:00 CEST (UTC+02:00)	Plewnia 20'; B. Iwan 42'; Markowski 86'		Madejski 32', 39', 112'; Wodecki 78'	Stadium: Stadion GKS; Attendance: 7,000; Referee: Jacek Granat (Warsaw)

23 September 2008	Odra Opole	2–0	Polonia Bytom	Opole
16:00 CEST (UTC+02:00)	Copik 42'; Jaskólski 81'			Stadium: Stadion Miejski; Attendance: 1,500; Referee: Mariusz Podgórski (Wrocław)

23 September 2008	Wisła Płock	1–2 (a.e.t.)	Legia Warsaw	Płock
20:00 CEST (UTC+02:00)	Wiśniewski 22'		Iwański 80', 102' (pen.)	Stadium: Stadion Wisły; Attendance: 3,500; Referee: Piotr Wasilewski (Kalisz)

24 September 2008	Stal Sanok	1–0	Widzew Łódź	Sanok
15:30 CEST (UTC+02:00)	Borowczyk 43'			Stadium: Stadion MOSiR; Attendance: 2,500; Referee: Jarosław Chmiel (Warsaw)

24 September 2008	Motor Lublin	0–2	ŁKS Łódź	Lublin
15:45 CEST (UTC+02:00)			Biskup 31'; Mowlik 61'	Stadium: MOSiR–Bystrzyca; Attendance: 800; Referee: Marek Karkut (Warsaw)

24 September 2008	Promień Opalenica	1–0	Zagłębie Sosnowiec	Opalenica
16:00 CEST (UTC+02:00)	Rewers 90+1'			Stadium: Stadion Promienia; Attendance: 700; Referee: Marcin Szrek (Kielce)

24 September 2008	Warta Poznań	0–2	Ruch Chorzów	Poznań
16:00 CEST (UTC+02:00)			Ćwieląg 56'; Zając 75'	Stadium: Stadion przy Drodze Dębińskiej; Attendance: 200; Referee: Radosław Trochimiuk (Ciechanów)

24 September 2008	Kmita Zabierzów	3–0	Korona Kielce	Zabierzów
16:00 CEST (UTC+02:00)	Cios 20', 90'; P. Wasilewski 34'			Stadium: Stadion Kmity; Attendance: 250; Referee: Paweł Pskit (Łódź)

24 September 2008	GKS Jastrzębie	3–4 (a.e.t.)	Zagłębie Lubin	Jastrzębie-Zdrój
18:00 CEST (UTC+02:00)	Wawrzyczek 12', 40' (pen.), 47'		Kędziora 58' (pen.); Zapaśnik 62'; Klofik 81'; Pawłowski 94'	Stadium: Stadion Miejski; Attendance: 450; Referee: Leszek Gawron (Mielec)

24 September 2008	Piast Gliwice	0–4	Lech Poznań	Gliwice
18:00 CEST (UTC+02:00)			Štilić 11', 53'; Murawski 22'; Rengifo 90'	Stadium: Stadion Piast; Attendance: 2,500; Referee: Jacek Walczyński (Lublin)

24 September 2008	Lechia Gdańsk Reserves	0–3	Wisła Kraków	Gdańsk
18:00 CEST (UTC+02:00)			Jirsák 64'; Brożek 72', 82'	Stadium: Stadion MOSiR; Attendance: 3,000; Referee: Włodzimierz Bartos (Łódź)

24 September 2008	Arka Gdynia	1–2	Odra Wodzisław Śląski	Gdynia
20:00 CEST (UTC+02:00)	Chmiest 69'		Szymiczek 33'; Korzym 90'	Stadium: Stadion GOSiR; Attendance: 4,000; Referee: Szymon Marciniak (Płock)

7 October 2008	Lechia Gdańsk	0–1	Jagiellonia Białystok	Gdańsk
18:00 CEST (UTC+02:00)			Zawistowski 90'	Stadium: Stadion MOSiR; Attendance: 6,500; Referee: Marcin Szulc (Warsaw)

== Round 3 ==
The sixteen winners of Round 2 competed in this round.

Team 1	Score	Team 2
28 October 2008
Cracovia	3–0	ŁKS Łódź
Kmita Zabierzów	0–2	Polonia Warsaw
Lech Poznań	1–0	Odra Wodzisław Śląski
Odra Opole	0–2	Ruch Chorzów
29 October 2008
Legia Warsaw	0–0 (a.e.t.) (8–7 p)	Jagiellonia Białystok
Promień Opalenica	1–4	Zagłębie Lubin
Wisła Kraków	2–1	Górnik Zabrze
Stal Sanok	2–0	Stal Stalowa Wola

28 October 2008	Kmita Zabierzów	0–2	Polonia Warsaw	Zabierzów
13:00 CET (UTC+01:00)			Kosmalski 20', 87'	Stadium: Stadion Kmity; Attendance: 100; Referee: Mirosław Górecki (Katowice)

28 October 2008	Cracovia	3–0	ŁKS Łódź	Kraków
18:00 CET (UTC+01:00)	Kaszuba 12'; Witkowski 80'; Nowak 84'			Stadium: Marshal Józef Piłsudski Stadium; Attendance: 2,000; Referee: Piotr Wasielewski (Kalisz)

28 October 2008	Odra Opole	0–2	Ruch Chorzów	Opole
18:00 CET (UTC+01:00)			Sobczak 15'; Grzyb 64' (pen.)	Stadium: Stadion Miejski Opole; Attendance: 3,000; Referee: Piotr Pielak (Warsaw)

28 October 2008	Lech Poznań	1–0	Odra Wodzisław Śląski	Poznań
20:00 CET (UTC+01:00)	Đurđević 90'			Stadium: Stadion Miejski; Attendance: 6,000; Referee: Włodzimierz Bartos (Łódź)

29 October 2008	Legia Warsaw	0–0 (a.e.t.) (8–7 p)	Jagiellonia Białystok	Warsaw
17:00 CET (UTC+01:00)				Stadium: Polish Army Stadium; Attendance: 1,500; Referee: Jarosław Żyro (Bydgoszcz)
	Penalties
	Iwański (penalty scored); Roger (penalty scored); Kiełbowicz (penalty scored); Choto (penalty scored); Grzelak (penalty scored); Rybus (penalty scored); Rzeźniczak (penalty scored); Smoliński (penalty scored)		(penalty scored) Hermes; (penalty scored) Everton; (penalty scored) Łatka; (penalty scored) Cionek; (penalty scored) Pacan; (penalty scored) Norambuena; (penalty scored) Dzienis; (penalty missed) Pešír

29 October 2008	Promień Opalenica	1–4	Zagłębie Lubin	Opalenica
14:00 CET (UTC+01:00)	Gościniak 52'		Micanski 32', 58', 59', 90'	Stadium: Stadion Promienia; Attendance: 500; Referee: Tomasz Cwalina (Gdańsk)

29 October 2008	Wisła Kraków	2–1	Górnik Zabrze	Kraków
20:10 CET (UTC+01:00)	Zieńczuk 12'; Díaz 80'		Léo 5'	Stadium: Wisła Stadium; Attendance: 7,000; Referee: Marcin Szulc (Warsaw)

29 October 2008	Stal Sanok	2–0	Stal Stalowa Wola	Sanok
13:30 CET (UTC+01:00)	Węgrzyn 55'; Borowczyk 77'			Stadium: Stadion MOSiR; Attendance: 1,500; Referee: Erwin Paterek (Lublin)

== Quarter-finals ==
The quarterfinals were played in two legs. The first legs were played on March 4, 17 and 18, 2009 while the second legs took place on April 7 and 8, 2009.

Team 1	Agg.	Team 2	1st leg	2nd leg
Wisła Kraków	1–3	Lech Poznań	0–1	1–2
Ruch Chorzów	5–1	Zagłębie Lubin	3–0	2–1
Legia Warsaw	4–2	Stal Sanok	3–1	1–1
Polonia Warsaw	3–2	Cracovia	1–0	2–2

=== First leg ===
4 March 2009	Wisła Kraków	0–1	Lech Poznań	Kraków
20:00 CET (UTC+01:00)			Lewandowski 49'	Stadium: Stadion Henryka Reymana; Attendance: 10,000; Referee: Robert Małek (Zabrze)

17 March 2009	Ruch Chorzów	3–0	Zagłębie Lubin	Chorzów
18:00 CET (UTC+01:00)	Baláž 32' (pen.); Pulkowski 38'; Grzyb 54'			Stadium: Stadion Śląski; Attendance: not attendanced Referee: Piotr Wasielewski (Kalisz)

17 March 2009	Legia Warsaw	3–1	Stal Sanok	Warsaw
20:00 CET (UTC+01:00)	Rocki 19'; Paluchowski 45+1'; Rzeźniczak 90'		Borowczyk 24'	Stadium: Stadion Wojska Polskiego; Attendance: 3,000; Referee: Wojciech Krztoń (Olsztyn)

18 March 2009	Polonia Warsaw	1–0	Cracovia	Warsaw
20:00 CET (UTC+01:00)	Lato 54'			Stadium: Stadion Polonii; Attendance: 2,000; Referee: Dawid Piasecki (Słupsk)

=== Second leg ===
7 April 2009	Zagłębie Lubin	1–2 (1–5 agg.)	Ruch Chorzów	Lubin
17:30 CEST (UTC+02:00)	Piotrowski 70'		Baláž 9'; Nowacki 57'	Stadium: Dialog Arena; Attendance: 4,000; Referee: Marcin Roguski (Warsaw)

7 April 2009	Cracovia	2–2 (2–3 agg.)	Polonia Warsaw	Kraków
17:30 CEST (UTC+02:00)	Nowak 49'; Moskała 73'		Ivanovski 6'; Piątek 56'	Stadium: Marshal Józef Piłsudski Stadium; Attendance: 2,000; Referee: Mariusz Trofimiec (Kielce)

8 April 2009	Stal Sanok	1–1 (2–4 agg.)	Legia Warsaw	Sanok
13:00 CEST (UTC+02:00)	Kosiba 46'		Rocki 64'	Stadium: Stadion MOSiR; Attendance: 3,000; Referee: Sebastian Jarzębak (Bytom)

8 April 2009	Lech Poznań	2–1 (3–1 agg.)	Wisła Kraków	Poznań
17:30 CEST (UTC+02:00)	Lewandowski 26'; Rengifo 29'		Głowacki 49'	Stadium: Stadion Miejski; Attendance: 16,500; Referee: Adam Kajzer (Rzeszów)

== Semi-finals ==
The semifinals were also played in two legs. The first legs were played on April 29 and 30, 2009, while the second legs took place on May 6 and 7, 2009.

Team 1	Agg.	Team 2	1st leg	2nd leg
Legia Warsaw	0–2	Ruch Chorzów	0–1	0–1
Lech Poznań	2–2 (3–0 p)	Polonia Warsaw	1–1	1–1 (a.e.t.)

=== First leg ===
29 April 2009	Legia Warsaw	0–1	Ruch Chorzów	Warsaw
17:45 CEST (UTC+02:00)		Report (in Polish)	Mucha 70' (o.g.)	Stadium: Polish Army Stadium; Attendance: 2,500; Referee: Włodzimierz Bartos (Łódź)

30 April 2009	Lech Poznań	1–1	Polonia Warsaw	Poznań
17:45 CEST (UTC+02:00)	Štilić 14'	Report (in Polish)	Lato 23'	Stadium: Stadion Miejski; Attendance: 14,000; Referee: Robert Małek (Zabrze)

=== Second leg ===
6 May 2009	Polonia Warsaw	1–1 (a.e.t.) (2–2 agg.) (0–3 p)	Lech Poznań	Warsaw
17:30 CEST (UTC+02:00)	Jodłowiec 87'	Report (in Polish)	Rengifo 60' (pen.)	Stadium: Polonia Stadium; Attendance: 2,200; Referee: Mirosław Górecki (Katowice)
	Penalties
	Mynář (penalty missed); Lato (penalty missed); Majewski (penalty missed)		(penalty scored) Kucharski; (penalty scored) Štilić; (penalty scored) Cueto

7 May 2009	Ruch Chorzów	1–0 (2–0 agg.)	Legia Warsaw	Chorzów
17:30 CEST (UTC+02:00)	Baláž 2'	Report (in Polish)		Stadium: Stadion Ruchu; Attendance: 5,000; Referee: Adam Lyczmański (Bydgoszcz)

== Final ==
19 May 2009
20:00 CEST (UTC+02:00)

Ruch Chorzów	0–1	Lech Poznań
		Peszko 51'

Silesian Stadium, Chorzów
Attendance: 25,000
Referee: Tomasz Mikulski (Lublin)

Ruch Chorzów	Lech Poznań

GK	80	(Poland) Krzysztof Pilarz
DF	29	(Poland) Ariel Jakubowski
DF	15	(Poland) Rafał Grodzicki	Booked
DF	4	(Poland) Ireneusz Adamski
DF	22	(Poland) Tomasz Brzyski
MF	6	(Poland) Wojciech Grzyb (c)
MF	3	(Poland) Grzegorz Baran
MF	17	(Poland) Michał Pulkowski			(substituted off) 77'
MF	11	(Poland) Marcin Nowacki			(substituted off) 55'
FW	20	(Slovakia) Pavol Baláž
FW	76	(Poland) Remigiusz Jezierski		Booked	(substituted off) 65'
Substitutes:
FW	19	(Poland) Artur Sobiech			(substituted on) 55'
FW	14	(Poland) Łukasz Janoszka			(substituted on) 65'
MF	28	(Slovakia) Gábor Straka			(substituted on) 77'
Manager:
(Poland) Waldemar Fornalik

GK	31	(Croatia) Ivan Turina	Booked
DF	23	(Poland) Marcin Kikut
DF	18	(North Macedonia) Zlatko Tanevski	Booked
DF	5	(Colombia) Manuel Arboleda
DF	25	(Panama) Luis Henríquez
MF	14	(Bosnia and Herzegovina) Semir Štilić		(substituted off) 73'
MF	17	(Poland) Sławomir Peszko		(substituted off) 89'
MF	6	(Poland) Tomasz Bandrowski	Booked
MF	16	(Poland) Rafał Murawski (c)
FW	11	(Peru) Hernán Rengifo
FW	8	(Poland) Robert Lewandowski		(substituted off) 90'
Substitutes:
MF	21	(Serbia) Dimitrije Injac		(substituted on) 73'
MF	7	(Poland) Jakub Wilk		(substituted on) 89'
MF	3	(Serbia) Ivan Đurđević		(substituted on) 90'
Manager:
(Poland) Franciszek Smuda
