= 2008–09 Ekstraklasa =

83rd season of top-tier football league in Poland

Ekstraklasa
- Season: 2008–09
- Dates: 8 August 2008 – 30 May 2009
- Champions: Wisła Kraków (13th Ekstraklasa title 12th Polish title)
- Relegated: Górnik Zabrze; ŁKS (license revoked)
- Champions League: Wisła Kraków
- Europa League: Lech Poznań (via Polish Cup); Legia Warsaw; Polonia Warsaw
- Matches: 240
- Goals: 524 (2.18 per match)
- Top goalscorer: Paweł Brożek; Takesure Chinyama (19 goals each)
- Biggest home win: 7 matches with 4–0
- Biggest away win: Polonia B. 0–4 Polonia W. (13 September 2008); ŁKS 0–4 Wisła (17 May 2009)
- Highest scoring: ŁKS 4–3 Cracovia (6 March 2009)
- Highest attendance: 40,000; Ruch 0–1 Górnik (28 February 2009)
- Total attendance: 1,764,696
- Average attendance: 7,353 ▲0.3%

The 2008–09 Ekstraklasa was the 83rd season of the Polish Football Championship, the 75th season of the highest tier domestic division in the Polish football league system since its establishment in 1927 and the 1st season of the Ekstraklasa under its current title. The league is operated by the Ekstraklasa S.A.

The season was played as a round-robin tournament. It began on 8 August 2008 and concluded on 30 May 2009. The season was originally scheduled to start on 25 July 2008. However, the first two rounds of games were postponed because of legal uncertainties about the number of teams in the competition following an association-wide corruption scandal. Each team played a total of 30 matches, half at home and half away.

Wisła Kraków won the league for the second time in a row and for the 12th time in their history after defeating Śląsk Wrocław 2–0 in the final match of the season. Legia Warsaw finished as runners-up and qualified for the second qualifying round of 2009–10 UEFA Europa League. Lech Poznań finished third and qualified for the third qualifying round of the Europa League after winning the Polish Cup. Polonia Warsaw also managed to earn a spot in Europe by finishing fourth, thereby qualifying for the first qualifying round of the Europa League. Paweł Brożek of Wisła Kraków and Takesure Chinyama of Legia Warsaw finished as joint topscorers with 19 goals in the season.

On the bottom end of the table, relegation was once again subject to several non-competitive events. On competitive criteria, Górnik Zabrze and Cracovia would have been relegated to the I liga, while Arka Gdynia would have had to compete in the relegation play-offs. However, ŁKS Łódź were denied a license for the 2009–10 season and thus were automatically relegated. The club appealed the decision without any success. Since ŁKS city rivals Widzew were also denied of promoting from the First League and appealed this decision, thus creating uncertainties about the First League play-off participant, the Polish FA decided in June to postpone the relegation play-offs to an unknown date before eventually cancelling the matches completely. (see below).

== Team changes from last season ==
Due to the corruption scandal several teams from last season have been punished with relegation. Those teams include Zagłębie Lubin, Korona Kielce and Zagłębie Sosnowiec. Lubin and Kielce were relegated to the First League while Sosnowiec were demoted an additional level to the Second League because they also finished the season in 16th and last place, a regular demotion spot. Widzew Łódź, who ended the season in 15th place, originally were going to be penalized as well. However, the club successfully appealed the decision in front of the Polish Olympic Committee, so they were assigned to the First League as a regularly demoted club.

Promotion to this year's Ekstraklasa was earned by I liga champions Lechia Gdańsk, runners-up Śląsk Wrocław, 3rd placed Piast Gliwice and 4th placed Arka Gdynia.

Dyskobolia Grodzisk Wielkopolski has been sold to an owner of I liga's club Polonia Warsaw. The two clubs merged, with Grodzisk's players and Ekstraklasa license transferred to Polonia. The merger concluded a series of negotiations between Grodzisk and other clubs. The initially planned merger with Śląsk Wrocław was eventually denied by the latter after several months of discussions. Grodzisk chairman Zbigniew Drzymała then started conversations with Pogoń Szczecin, which were quickly stopped without an agreement as well, before eventually coming to an agreement with Polonia.

== Team overview ==
=== Stadia and locations ===
Location of teams in 2008–09 Ekstraklasa
Location of teams in the Katowice urban area

Team	Venue	Capacity
Arka Gdynia	Stadion Miejski	12,000*
Cracovia	Stadion Cracovii	11,000
GKS Bełchatów	Stadion GKS	5,264*
Górnik Zabrze	Stadion Ernesta Pohla	17,722
Jagiellonia Białystok	Stadion Miejski	10,000*
Lech Poznań	Stadion Lecha	24,166*
Lechia Gdańsk	Stadion Lechii	12,244
Legia Warsaw	Stadion Wojska Polskiego	13,628*
Łódzki KS	Stadion ŁKS	12,160
Odra Wodzisław Śląski	Stadion Miejski	6,620
Piast Gliwice	Stadion Piasta	6,000
Polonia Bytom	Stadion Edwarda Szymkowiaka	7,000
Polonia Warsaw	Stadion Polonii	7,150
Ruch Chorzów	Stadion Ruchu	9,300
Śląsk Wrocław	Stadion Oporowska	8,346
Wisła Kraków	Stadion Henryka Reymana	15,595*

*Stadiums are under redevelopment

=== Personnel and sponsoring ===
Team	Head coach	Team captain	Kitmaker	Shirt sponsor
Arka Gdynia	(Poland) Marek Chojnacki	(Poland) Olgierd Moskalewicz	Jako	Polnord
Cracovia	(Poland) Artur Płatek	(Poland) Bartosz Ślusarski	Zina	Comarch
GKS Bełchatów	(Poland) Rafał Ulatowski	(Poland) Edward Cecot	Adidas	PGE
Górnik Zabrze	(Poland) Henryk Kasperczak	(Poland) Sebastian Nowak	Jako	Allianz
Jagiellonia Białystok	(Poland) Michał Probierz	(Poland) Tomasz Frankowski	Joma	VacansOleil
Lech Poznań	(Poland) Franciszek Smuda	(Poland) Rafał Murawski	Puma	Warka
Lechia Gdańsk	(Poland) Tomasz Kafarski	(Poland) Karol Piątek	Jako	SNG Energa
Legia Warsaw	(Poland) Jan Urban	(Poland) Wojciech Szala	Adidas	n
Łódzki KS	(Poland) Grzegorz Wesołowski	(Poland) Marcin Adamski	Umbro	BioAg Solutions
Odra Wodzisław Śląski	(Poland) Ryszard Wieczorek	(Poland) Jan Woś	Tico	Rojek-Decor
Piast Gliwice	(Poland) Dariusz Fornalak	(Poland) Jarosław Kaszowski	Errea	
Polonia Bytom	(Ukraine) Yuri Shatalov	(Poland) Jacek Trzeciak	Tico	Armanda Development
Polonia Warsaw	(Poland) Jacek Grembocki	(Czech Republic) Radek Mynář	Zina	JW Construction
Ruch Chorzów	(Poland) Waldemar Fornalik	(Poland) Wojciech Grzyb	Colo	GOCC
Śląsk Wrocław	(Poland) Ryszard Tarasiewicz	(Poland) Dariusz Sztylka	Garman	Piast
Wisła Kraków	(Poland) Maciej Skorża	(Poland) Marcin Baszczyński	Umbro	bet-at-home.com

== League table ==
Pos	Team	Pld	W	D	L	GF	GA	GD	Pts	Qualification or relegation
1	Wisła Kraków (C)	30	19	7	4	53	21	+32	64	Qualification to Champions League second qualifying round
2	Legia Warsaw	30	18	7	5	52	17	+35	61	Qualification to Europa League second qualifying round
3	Lech Poznań	30	16	11	3	51	24	+27	59	Qualification to Europa League third qualifying round (Note: Lech Poznań are the winners of the 2008–09 Polish Cup competition and therefore have qualified for the third qualifying round of the UEFA Europa League.)
4	Polonia Warsaw	30	15	9	6	40	23	+17	54 (Note: GKS 1–2 PWA; PWA 1–0 GKS)	Qualification to Europa League first qualifying round
5	GKS Bełchatów	30	17	3	10	40	28	+12	54	
6	Śląsk Wrocław	30	11	12	7	40	34	+6	45	
7	Polonia Bytom	30	10	5	15	30	46	−16	35	
8	Jagiellonia Białystok	30	9	7	14	28	34	−6	34 (Note: JAG 1–0 RUC; RUC 0–0 JAG)	
9	Ruch Chorzów	30	9	7	14	22	32	−10	34	
10	Piast Gliwice	30	9	6	15	17	26	−9	33	
11	Lechia Gdańsk	30	9	5	16	30	44	−14	32 (Note: ODR 1–0 LGD; LGD 3–1 ODR)	
12	Odra Wodzisław	30	8	8	14	23	40	−17	32	
13	Arka Gdynia	30	7	9	14	27	39	−12	30 (Note: ARK 2–1 CRA; CRA 0–0 ARK)	
14	Cracovia	30	7	9	14	24	40	−16	30	
15	Górnik Zabrze (R)	30	7	8	15	20	33	−13	29	Relegation to I liga
16	ŁKS Łódź (Note: ŁKS Łódź did not receive a license for the 2009–10 season due to financial problems.) (R)	30	10	5	15	27	43	−16	35	Relegation to I liga

Source: 90minut.pl (in Polish)
Rules for classification: 1st points; 2nd head-to-head points; 3rd head-to-head goal difference; 4th head-to-head goals scored; 5th head-to-head away goals scored; 6th goal difference; 7th goals scored
(C) Champions; (R) Relegated

== Results ==
Home \ Away	ARK	CRA	BEŁ	GÓR	JAG	LPO	LGD	LEG	ŁKS	ODR	PIA	PBY	PWA	RUC	ŚLĄ	WIS
Arka Gdynia		2–1	2–0	1–0	1–1	2–1	0–1	0–1	4–0	2–1	0–1	1–3	0–1	1–2	3–3	0–1
Cracovia	0–0		1–0	0–0	2–0	0–1	3–1	0–3	2–0	0–0	1–0	0–1	1–0	0–0	1–1	1–1
GKS Bełchatów	1–1	3–0		1–0	2–0	2–3	1–0	1–0	0–2	3–0	0–0	3–1	1–2	1–0	2–1	0–0
Górnik Zabrze	2–2	0–2	2–3		1–0	1–1	2–0	0–3	2–0	2–0	1–0	2–0	0–1	0–0	1–2	1–1
Jagiellonia Białystok	3–0	2–0	0–2	1–0		0–3	2–0	2–1	4–0	1–2	2–0	2–2	2–1	1–0	2–2	0–2
Lech Poznań	0–0	2–2	2–3	3–0	1–0		1–0	0–0	1–1	3–1	1–0	3–0	2–0	1–1	1–1	1–1
Lechia Gdańsk	2–1	2–0	1–2	1–0	3–1	0–3		2–3	2–1	3–1	0–0	0–1	0–0	2–0	1–1	2–4
Legia Warsaw	2–0	4–0	3–0	0–0	2–0	1–1	3–0		1–0	4–0	3–1	3–1	2–2	4–1	4–0	2–1
ŁKS Łódź	3–0	4–3	0–2	2–0	1–0	0–3	2–1	0–0		0–0	0–1	2–0	1–2	0–1	0–0	0–4
Odra Wodzisław	0–0	2–1	0–2	0–0	1–1	0–1	1–0	2–0	0–1		0–2	4–1	1–1	3–0	0–0	0–2
Piast Gliwice	1–2	2–0	1–0	1–0	1–1	1–2	0–2	0–1	2–1	0–1		1–0	0–2	0–0	0–1	1–1
Polonia Bytom	2–1	1–0	1–2	2–0	1–0	1–1	4–1	1–0	2–3	1–1	1–0		0–4	0–3	1–1	1–1
Polonia Warsaw	0–0	1–1	1–0	2–0	0–0	3–3	1–1	0–0	1–3	2–0	1–0	1–0		3–0	3–0	0–2
Ruch Chorzów	0–0	2–0	0–1	0–1	0–0	2–0	2–1	0–1	2–0	0–1	0–0	2–1	1–3		1–2	1–0
Śląsk Wrocław	2–1	1–1	2–1	1–1	2–0	0–2	1–1	1–1	3–0	4–0	0–1	3–0	0–1	3–1		2–1
Wisła Kraków	4–0	4–1	2–1	3–1	1–0	1–4	3–0	1–0	0–0	3–1	2–0	1–0	2–1	2–0	2–0	

Source: 90minut.pl (in Polish)
Legend: Blue = home team win; Yellow = draw; Red = away team win.

== Season statistics ==
=== Scoring ===
- First goal of the season: Hernán Rengifo (Lech Poznań) Match: 2-3 GKS Bełchatów, 47th minute (8 August 2008)
- Last goal of the season: Grzegorz Niciński (Arka Gdynia) Match: 2-1 Odra Wodzisław, 79th minute (30 May 2009)
- Fastest goal in a match: Arkadiusz Aleksander (Odra Wodzisław) Match: 2-0 Legia Warsaw, 1st minute (17 August 2008)
- First hat-trick of the season: Filip Ivanovski (Polonia Warsaw) Match: 3-0 Śląsk Wrocław, 21', 24', 67'.(29 August 2008);
- Fastest hat-trick of the season: Rafał Boguski (Wisła Kraków) Match: 3-1 Odra Wodzisław, 52', 62', 77', 25 minutes. (5 December 2008)
- Most goals scored by a player in one game: Daniel Mąka (Polonia Warsaw) Match: 4-0 Polonia Bytom, 64', 87', 89', 3 goals.(13 September 2008);
  - Rafał Boguski (Wisła Kraków) Match: 3-1 Odra Wodzisław, 52', 62', 77', 3 goals. (5 December 2008)
  - Filip Ivanovski (Polonia Warsaw) Match: 3-0 Śląsk Wrocław, 21', 24', 67', 3 goals.(29 August 2008)
  - Marcin Komorowski (Polonia Bytom) Match: 4-1 Lechia Gdańsk, 9', 41', 69', 3 goals.(29 August 2008)
- Widest winning margin: 8 teams tied Match: 4-0, 4 goals.
- Most goals in a match: ŁKS Łódź Match: 4-3 Cracovia, 7 goals.(6 March 2009)

=== Team Records ===
- Most wins: Wisła Kraków (19 wins)
- Fewest wins: Cracovia, Arka Gdynia, Górnik Zabrze (7 wins)
- Most draws: Śląsk Wrocław (12 draws)
- Fewest draws: GKS Bełchatów (3 draws)
- Fewest losses: Lech Poznań (3 losses)
- Most losses: Lechia Gdańsk (16 losses)
- Most goals scored:Wisła Kraków (53 goals)
- Fewest goals scored: Piast Gliwice (17 goals)
- Most goals conceded: Polonia Bytom (46 goals)
- Fewest goals conceded: Legia Warsaw (17 goals)

== Top goalscorers ==
Rank	Player	Club	Goals
1	(Poland) Paweł Brożek	Wisła Kraków	19
1	(Zimbabwe) Takesure Chinyama	Legia Warsaw	19
3	(Poland) Robert Lewandowski	Lech Poznań	14
4	(North Macedonia) Filip Ivanovski	Polonia Warsaw	12
5	(Poland) Dawid Nowak	GKS Bełchatów	10
5	(Poland) Dariusz Pawlusiński	Cracovia	10
7	(Poland) Rafał Boguski	Wisła Kraków	9
7	(Peru) Hernan Rengifo	Lech Poznań	9
7	(Bosnia and Herzegovina) Semir Štilić	Lech Poznań	9
7	(Poland) Tomasz Szewczuk	Śląsk Wrocław	9

== Relegation play-offs ==
The relegation play-offs were cancelled after a series of appeals over the question in which division both ŁKS Łódź and First League 2008–09 champions Widzew Łódź will play in the 2009-10 season. Originally, Arka Gdynia as 14th-placed team (sports court decisions excluded) of the Ekstraklasa and Korona Kielce as 3rd-placed team of the First League were scheduled to play in a two-legged play-off for a spot in Ekstraklasa 2009–10. However, the Polish FA were forced to postpone the series to an unknown later date due to the appeals and, after the issues could not be settled in time, eventually decided not to hold any matches.

== Attendances ==
No.	Club	Average	Highest
1	Lech Poznań	16,300	24,000
2	Górnik Zabrze	14,633	18,000
3	Wisła Kraków	12,473	15,600
4	Lechia Gdańsk	9,133	13,000
5	Ruch Chorzów	8,923	40,000
6	Arka Gdynia	7,675	13,000
7	Jagiellonia Białystok	7,547	11,000
8	Śląsk Wrocław	7,425	10,000
9	Legia Warszawa	5,880	11,000
10	Polonia Bytom	5,133	8,000
11	ŁKS	4,833	7,000
12	Cracovia	4,187	7,000
13	Odra Wodzisław Śląski	3,910	7,000
14	Bełchatów	3,300	5,000
15	Polonia Warszawa	3,227	3,000
16	Piast Gliwice	3,033	4,500
