= Ricardo Costa =

Ricardo Costa may refer to:

- Ricardo Costa (footballer, born 1981), Portuguese football defender
- Ricardo Costa (footballer, born 1973), Portuguese former football midfielder
- Ricardo Valter da Costa (born 1981), Brazilian former football midfielder
- Ricardo Mion Varella Costa (born 1982), Brazilian former football forward
- Ricardo Costa de Oliveira (born 1982), Brazilian athlete
