= 2006–07 Polish Cup =

Tournament details
- Country: Poland
- Teams: 65

Final positions
- Champions: Dyskobolia Grodzisk Wlkp.
- Runners-up: Korona Kielce

Tournament statistics
- Matches played: 67
- Goals scored: 221 (3.3 per match)
- Top goal scorer(s): Piotr Bagnicki; Janusz Dziedzic; Sławomir Matras (3 goals each)

The 2006–07 Polish Cup was the fifty-third season of the annual Polish cup competition. It began on 5 August 2006 with the Extra Preliminary Round and ended on 1 May 2007 with the Final, played at Stadion GKS, Bełchatów. The winners qualified for the first qualifying round of the UEFA Cup. Wisła Płock were the defending champions.

== Extra Preliminary Round ==
The matches took place on 5 and 9 August 2006.

Team 1	Score	Team 2
5 August 2006
Kaszubia Kościerzyna	1–0	Victoria Koronowo
9 August 2006
Sparta Augustów	1–3	Mrągowia Mrągowo
TOR Dobrzeń Wielki	0–2	Promień Żary
KSZO II Ostrowiec Świętokrzyski	0–0 (a.e.t.) (5–4 p)	Motor Lublin

== Preliminary round ==
The matches took place on 15 August 2006.

Team 1	Score	Team 2
15 August 2006
Czarni Pruszcz Gdański	6–1	Kłos Pełczyce
Toruński KP	4–4 (a.e.t.) (2–4 p)	Mieszko Gniezno
Tur Turek	5–1	Promień Żary
Jeziorak Iława	4–2	Mazowsze Płock
Ruch Wysokie Mazowieckie	0–2	Sokół Aleksandrów Łódzki
Znicz Pruszków	4–1	Mrągowia Mrągowo
Arka Nowa Sól	1–2	Chrobry Nowogrodziec
Górnik/Zagłębie Wałbrzych	1–0	Pniówek Pawłowice Śląskie
LKS Poborszów	2–0	Pelikan Łowicz
Przyszłość Rogów	1–0	Fablok Chrzanów
Ponidzie Nida Pińczów	1–0	Siarka Tarnobrzeg
Stal Sanok	1–0	KSZO II Ostrowiec Świętokrzyski
Okocimski KS Brzesko	4–3	Orlęta Radzyń Podlaski
No match
Kotwica Kołobrzeg	w/o^{1}	Kaszubia Kościerzyna

Notes

- Note 1: Kaszubia Kościerzyna withdrew from the competition.

== Round 1 ==
The matches took place on 22 and 23 August 2006.

Team 1	Score	Team 2
22 August 2006
Jeziorak Iława	1–0	Zagłębie Sosnowiec
Górnik/Zagłębie Wałbrzych	1–2	Podbeskidzie Bielsko-Biała
Szczakowianka Jaworzno	1–3	ŁKS Łódź
23 August 2006
Czarni Pruszcz Gdański	1–5	Jagiellonia Białystok
Kotwica Kołobrzeg	0–1	Lechia Gdańsk
Mieszko Gniezno	1–0	Śląsk Wrocław
Tur Turek	1–0	KSZO Ostrowiec Świętokrzyski
Sokół Aleksandrów Łódzki	2–4 (a.e.t.)	Piast Gliwice
Znicz Pruszków	5–2	Zawisza Bydgoszcz
Chrobry Nowogrodziec	0–5	Ruch Chorzów
LKS Poborszów	0–2	Radomiak Radom
Przyszłość Rogów	1–3	KS Polkowice
Ponidzie Nida Pińczów	0–3	Świt Nowy Dwór Mazowiecki
Stal Sanok	2–0	Polonia Bytom
Okocimski KS Brzesko	6–0	Drwęca Nowe Miasto Lubawskie
No match
Heko Czermno	w/o^{1}	Widzew Łódź

Notes

- Note 1: Heko Czermno withdrew from the competition.

== Round 2 ==
The matches took place on 19, 20, 26 September and 4 October 2006.

Team 1	Score	Team 2
19 September 2006
Lechia Gdańsk	0–2	Pogoń Szczecin
Mieszko Gniezno	0–1	Górnik Zabrze
Jeziorak Iława	2–3 (a.e.t.)	Zagłębie Lubin
Piast Gliwice	2–5	Arka Gdynia
Ruch Chorzów	6–0	Polonia Warsaw
Podbeskidzie Bielsko-Biała	1–2	Lech Poznań
Radomiak Radom	1–0	Odra Wodzisław
KS Polkowice	2–2 (a.e.t.) (5–4 p)	GKS Bełchatów
Widzew Łódź	0–2	Cracovia
20 September 2006
Tur Turek	1–3	Korona Kielce
Stal Sanok	2–1	Legia Warsaw
Okocimski KS Brzesko	4–4 (a.e.t.) (1–3 p)	Wisła Płock
ŁKS Łódź	2–1	Górnik Łęczna
26 September 2006
Znicz Pruszków	1–2	Dyskobolia Grodzisk Wlkp.
4 October 2006
Świt Nowy Dwór Mazowiecki	1–5	Wisła Kraków
No match
Jagiellonia Białystok	bye to the next round	

== Round 3 ==
The matches took place on 24 October, 7 and 8 November 2006.

Team 1	Score	Team 2
24 October 2006
Stal Sanok	0–1 (a.e.t.)	Arka Gdynia
Lech Poznań	2–1	Pogoń Szczecin
Górnik Zabrze	0–5	Korona Kielce
ŁKS Łódź	0–1	Radomiak Radom
KS Polkowice	0–3	Dyskobolia Grodzisk Wlkp.
Wisła Płock	2–1	Jagiellonia Białystok
7 November 2006
Cracovia	2–1	Zagłębie Lubin
8 November 2006
Wisła Kraków	1–2	Ruch Chorzów

== Quarter-finals ==
The first legs took place on 13 and 14 March, when the second legs took place on 3 and 4 April 2007.

Team 1	Agg.	Team 2	1st leg	2nd leg
Wisła Płock	4–1	Arka Gdynia	1–1	3–0^{1}
Korona Kielce	3–3 (a)	Lech Poznań	1–0	2–3
Radomiak Radom	1–4	Cracovia	1–3	0–1
Ruch Chorzów	1–4	Dyskobolia Grodzisk Wlkp.	0–1	1–3

Notes

- Note 1: Arka Gdynia was excluded from the competition for being involved in a corruption affair.

== Semi-finals ==
The first legs took place on 10 and 11 April, when the second legs took place on 24 and 25 April 2007.

Team 1	Agg.	Team 2	1st leg	2nd leg
Korona Kielce	4–3	Wisła Płock	3–2	1–1
Cracovia	0–2	Dyskobolia Grodzisk Wlkp.	0–1	0–1

== Final ==
1 May 2007
12:15 CEST (UTC+02:00)

Dyskobolia Grodzisk Wlkp.	2–0	Korona Kielce
Majewski 16'; Lato 77'	Report

Stadion GKS, Bełchatów
Attendance: 5,500
Referee: Grzegorz Gilewski (Radom)
