= Cho Jun-ho =

Cho Jun-ho may refer to:

- Cho Jun-ho (footballer), former South Korean football player and coach
- Cho Jun-ho (judoka), South Korean judoka
