= Kim Chang-hee =

Kim Chang-hee may refer to:

- Kim Chang-hee (weightlifter) (1921–1990), South Korean weightlifter
- Kim Chang-hee (footballer, born 1986), South Korean football midfielder
- Kim Chang-hee (footballer, born 1987), South Korean football midfielder
