= Sobczak =

Sobczak is a Polish surname. The Anglicized version is often spelled as Sobchak. Notable people with the surname include:

- Adam Sobczak (born 1989), Polish rower
- Anatoly Sobchak (1937–2000), Russian legislator and mayor of Saint Petersburg
- Anna Sobczak (born 1967), Polish fencer
- Bogusław Sobczak (born 1979), Polish politician
- Ksenia Sobchak (born 1981), TV presenter, daughter of Anatoly
- Marcin Sobczak (born 1987), Polish footballer
- Paweł Sobczak (born 1969), Polish field hockey player
- Ryszard Sobczak (born 1967), Polish fencer
- Szymon Sobczak (born 1992), Polish footballer

== Fictional characters ==
- Walter Sobchak, a character in the film The Big Lebowski
- Sobchak (Better Call Saul)

== See also ==
- Sobczyk
