= Kim Oh-sung =

South Korean footballer (born 1986)

Kim Oh-Sung
Personal information
- Full name: Kim Oh-Sung
- Date of birth: 16 August 1986 (age 40)
- Place of birth: South Korea
- Height: 1.79 m (5 ft 10 in)
- Position: Midfielder

Team information
- Current team: Ulsan Hyundai Mipo Dolphin FC
- Number: 10

Youth career
- 2005–2008: Korea University

Senior career*
Years	Team	Apps	(Gls)
2009–2012	Daegu FC	6	(0)
2011–2012	→ Police (army)		
2012–2013	Ulsan Hyundai Mipo	21	(9)
2014–2015	Gyeongju KH&NP	0	(0)
2015–	Ulsan Hyundai Mipo Dolphin FC	0	(0)
- * Club domestic league appearances and goals as of 13 January 2011

- Kim Oh-sung
- Hangul: 김오성
- Hanja: 金五星
- RR: Gim Oseong
- MR: Kim Osŏng

Kim Oh-Sung (Korean: 김오성; born 16 August 1986) is a South Korean football midfielder who plays for Gyeongju KH&NP in the Korea National League.

== Club career ==
Kim Oh-Sung was drafted to Daegu FC in 2009. He made his Daegu FC first-team debut on 20 June 2009 in a match against Suwon Bluewings, coming on as a substitute after 82 minutes of play. Kim made a further four K-League appearances during the season. Following limited on field play during the 2010 season (only one match), Kim joined R-League side Police FC to comply with his two-year military service obligations.

== Club career statistics ==
As of 13 January 2011

Club performance			League		Cup		League Cup		Total	
Season	Club	League	Apps	Goals	Apps	Goals	Apps	Goals	Apps	Goals
South Korea			League		KFA Cup		League Cup		Total	
2009	Daegu FC	K-League	5	0	0	0	0	0	5	0
2010	Daegu FC	K-League	1	0	0	0	0	0	1	0
2011	Police	R-League	-	-	-	-	-	-	-	-
Career total			6	0	0	0	0	0	6	0
