= 2009 K League =

K League
- Season: 2009
- Dates: Regular season: 7 March – 1 November 2009; Championship: 21 November – 6 December 2009
- Champions: Jeonbuk Hyundai Motors (1st title)
- Champions League: Jeonbuk Hyundai Motors; Seongnam Ilhwa Chunma; Pohang Steelers; Suwon Samsung Bluewings
- Matches: 210
- Goals: 554 (2.64 per match)
- Best player: Lee Dong-gook
- Top goalscorer: Lee Dong-gook (20 goals)
- Biggest home win: Seoul 5–1 Incheon (12 July 2009)
- Biggest away win: Jeju 1–8 Pohang (13 September 2009)
- Highest scoring: Jeju 1–8 Pohang (13 September 2009)
- Longest winning run: 6 matches Pohang Steelers
- Longest unbeaten run: 15 matches Pohang Steelers
- Longest losing run: 8 matches Gwangju Sangmu
- Highest attendance: 36,764; Seoul 2–1 Jeonbuk (12 September 2009)
- Lowest attendance: 1,367; Seongnam 3–1 Gyeongnam (12 July 2009)
- Average attendance: 11,226

The 2009 K League was the 27th season of the K League. It was held from 7 March to 6 December 2009, and a total of 15 teams contested, including newly formed Gangwon FC.

== Teams ==
Locations of the 2009 K League clubs

=== General information ===
Club	Manager	City	Stadium	2008 season
Busan IPark	(South Korea) Hwang Sun-hong	Busan	Busan Asiad Stadium	12th place
Jeonnam Dragons	(South Korea) Park Hang-seo	Gwangyang	Gwang-Yang Stadium	9th place
Daegu FC	(South Korea) Byun Byung-joo	Daegu	Daegu Stadium	11th place
Daejeon Citizen	(South Korea) Wang Sun-jae	Daejeon	Daejeon World Cup Stadium	13th place
FC Seoul	(Turkey) Şenol Güneş	Seoul	Seoul World Cup Stadium	Runners-up
Gangwon FC	(South Korea) Choi Soon-ho	Gangneung; Chuncheon	Gangneung Stadium; Chuncheon Stadium	—
Gwangju Sangmu	(South Korea) Lee Kang-jo	Gwangju	Gwangju World Cup Stadium	14th place
Gyeongnam FC	(South Korea) Cho Kwang-rae	Changwon	Changwon Civil Stadium	8th place
Incheon United	(Serbia) Ilija Petković	Incheon	Incheon Munhak Stadium	7th place
Jeju United	(South Korea) Park Kyung-hoon	Seogwipo	Jeju World Cup Stadium	10th place
Jeonbuk Hyundai Motors	(South Korea) Choi Kang-hee	Jeonju	Jeonju World Cup Stadium	4th place
Pohang Steelers	(Brazil) Sérgio Farias	Pohang	Steelyard Stadium	6th place
Seongnam Ilhwa Chunma	(South Korea) Shin Tae-yong	Seongnam	Seongnam 2 Stadium	5th place
Suwon Samsung Bluewings	(South Korea) Cha Bum-kun	Suwon	Suwon World Cup Stadium	Champions
Ulsan Hyundai	(South Korea) Kim Ho-kon	Ulsan	Munsu Cup Stadium	3rd place

=== Managerial changes ===
Team	Outgoing	Manner	Date	Incoming	Date	Table
Seongnam Ilhwa Chunma	(South Korea) Kim Hak-bum	Resigned	27 November 2008	(South Korea) Shin Tae-yong	1 December 2008	Pre-season
Incheon United	(South Korea) Chang Woe-ryong	Signed for Omiya Ardija	10 December 2008	(Serbia) Ilija Petković	7 January 2009	Pre-season
Ulsan Hyundai	(South Korea) Kim Jung-nam	Resigned	26 December 2008	(South Korea) Kim Ho-kon	26 December 2008	Pre-season
Daejeon Citizen	(South Korea) Kim Ho	Sacked	25 June 2009	(South Korea) Wang Sun-jae	25 June 2009	13th
Jeju United	(Brazil) Arthur Bernardes	Resigned	14 October 2009	(South Korea) Cho Jin-ho	14 October 2009	13th
Jeju United	(South Korea) Cho Jin-ho	Caretaker	29 October 2009	(South Korea) Park Kyung-hoon	30 October 2009	13th

=== Foreign players ===
Club	Player 1	Player 2	Player 3	AFC player	Former player(s)
Busan IPark	(Brazil) Di Fábio	(Brazil) Paulinho Guará	(Brazil) Rômulo		
Jeonnam Dragons	(Brazil) Adriano Chuva	(Brazil) Wesley	(Serbia) Aleksandar Petrović		
Daegu	(Brazil) Léo Paulista	(Brazil) Valdeir		(China) Feng Xiaoting	(Cameroon) Émile Mbamba (Serbia) Lazar Popović
Daejeon Citizen	(Brazil) Alexandre	(Brazil) Válber	(Serbia) Stevan Račić		(Brazil) Vinicius (Brazil) Ricardo Costa
FC Seoul	(Brazil) Adilson	(Brazil) Anderson	(Montenegro) Dejan Damjanović		(France) Kevin Hatchi
Gangwon FC	(Brazil) Caion	(Croatia) Stipe Lapić		(Japan) Masahiro Ohashi	
Gwangju Sangmu Bulsajo					
Gyeongnam	(Brazil) Bruno Cazarine	(Brazil) Índio	(Brazil) Marcelo Pinheiro	(Japan) Kazuyuki Toda	(Brazil) Claudinho (Brazil) Rogério
Incheon United	(North Macedonia) Dragan Čadikovski	(Serbia) Dragan Mladenović	(Serbia) Ognjen Koroman	(Australia) Jade North	(Serbia) Borko Veselinović
Jeju United	(Brazil) Esquerdinha	(Brazil) Jóbson	(Brazil) Ricardinho		
Jeonbuk Hyundai Motors	(Brazil) Brasília	(Brazil) Eninho	(Brazil) Luiz Henrique	(China) Wan Houliang	(Serbia) Aleksandar Petrović
Pohang Steelers	(Brazil) Denílson	(Brazil) Vaguinho	(North Macedonia) Stevica Ristić		(Brazil) Brasília
Seongnam Ilhwa Chunma	(Brazil) Fabrício Souza	(Colombia) Mauricio Molina	(Montenegro) Dženan Radončić	(Australia) Sasa Ognenovski	(Brazil) Mota
Suwon Samsung Bluewings	(Brazil) Edu	(Brazil) Sandro Hiroshi	(Brazil) Tiago	(China) Li Weifeng	(Brazil) Jorge Luiz
Ulsan Hyundai	(Brazil) Almir	(Brazil) Fábio Luís	(North Macedonia) Slavčo Georgievski	(Australia) Antun Kovacic	(Brazil) Luizinho

== Regular season ==
=== League table ===
Pos	Team	Pld	W	D	L	GF	GA	GD	Pts	Qualification
1	Jeonbuk Hyundai Motors	28	17	6	5	59	33	+26	57	Qualification for the playoffs final
2	Pohang Steelers	28	14	11	3	55	33	+22	53	Qualification for the playoffs semi-final
3	FC Seoul	28	16	5	7	47	27	+20	53	Qualification for the playoffs first round
4	Seongnam Ilhwa Chunma	28	13	6	9	40	34	+6	45	Qualification for the playoffs first round
5	Incheon United	28	11	10	7	31	29	+2	43	Qualification for the playoffs first round
6	Jeonnam Dragons	28	11	9	8	41	39	+2	42	Qualification for the playoffs first round
7	Gyeongnam FC	28	10	10	8	38	32	+6	40	
8	Ulsan Hyundai	28	9	9	10	32	29	+3	36	
9	Daejeon Citizen	28	8	9	11	29	38	−9	33	
10	Suwon Samsung Bluewings	28	8	8	12	29	32	−3	32	Qualification for the Champions League (Note: Qualified as champions of the FA Cup.)
11	Gwangju Sangmu	28	9	3	16	33	40	−7	30	
12	Busan IPark	28	7	8	13	36	42	−6	29	
13	Gangwon FC	28	7	7	14	42	57	−15	28	
14	Jeju United	28	7	7	14	22	44	−22	28	
15	Daegu FC	28	5	8	15	20	45	−25	23	

Source: K League (in Korean)
Rules for classification: 1) Points; 2) Goal difference; 3) Goals scored

=== Positions by matchday ===
Team ╲ Round	1	2	3	4	5	6	7	8	9	10	11	12	13	14	15	16	17	18	19	20	21	22	23	24	25	26	27	28	29	30
Jeonbuk Hyundai Motors	6	2	1	1	2	2	2	1	1	1	2	3	3	2	3	2	2	2	2	3	2	2	2	2	2	2	1	1	1	1
Pohang Steelers	3	3	5	7	7	7	8	9	7	10	10	8	6	6	5	4	4	3	3	2	3	3	3	3	3	3	3	3	3	2
FC Seoul	1	4	7	6	4	3	3	3	4	4	4	2	2	3	1	1	1	1	1	1	1	1	1	1	1	1	2	2	2	3
Seongnam Ilhwa Chunma	6	9	9	12	10	5	5	5	6	7	6	7	8	8	7	8	9	8	8	8	8	7	4	4	5	4	4	4	4	4
Incheon United	4	6	6	3	5	4	4	4	3	3	3	4	4	4	4	5	5	5	5	4	6	4	5	5	6	6	6	6	7	5
Jeonnam Dragons	15	15	13	14	14	15	9	6	5	5	5	6	7	7	8	7	7	9	6	6	5	6	7	7	4	5	5	5	5	6
Gyeongnam FC	6	8	8	9	9	14	15	15	11	12	11	12	11	11	14	14	14	14	14	14	13	10	8	6	7	8	7	7	6	7
Ulsan Hyundai	10	10	14	10	13	9	11	7	8	11	12	14	12	13	9	10	10	12	13	13	11	9	10	9	8	7	8	8	8	8
Daejeon Citizen	14	14	12	8	8	10	12	11	13	13	14	13	13	12	11	12	13	13	12	10	10	12	13	10	11	11	12	12	11	9
Suwon Samsung Bluewings	11	11	15	15	12	12	14	13	15	15	13	11	14	14	13	11	12	11	11	12	14	14	11	12	10	10	9	9	9	10
Gwangju Sangmu	2	5	3	2	1	1	1	2	2	2	1	1	1	1	2	3	3	4	4	5	4	5	6	8	9	9	10	10	10	11
Busan IPark	12	11	10	11	15	13	6	10	9	6	7	9	10	10	12	13	11	10	10	11	12	13	14	14	14	13	11	11	12	12
Gangwon FC	4	1	2	5	3	5	7	8	10	9	8	5	5	5	6	6	8	6	9	9	9	11	12	13	13	14	14	14	14	13
Jeju United	12	7	4	4	6	8	10	12	12	8	9	10	9	9	10	9	6	7	7	7	7	8	9	11	12	12	13	13	13	14
Daegu FC	6	13	11	13	11	11	13	14	14	14	15	15	15	15	15	15	15	15	15	15	15	15	15	15	15	15	15	15	15	15

Source: K League

=== Results ===
Home \ Away	BIP	JND	DGU	DJC	SEO	GWN	GWJ	GNM	ICU	JJU	JHM	PHS	SIC	SSB	USH
Busan IPark	—	2–2	1–0	2–1	2–2	2–0	2–3	2–0	0–1	3–0	3–1	1–2	1–2	1–1	1–2
Jeonnam Dragons	3–2	—	0–1	2–0	1–6	4–1	1–1	2–0	1–1	0–0	1–3	1–0	2–0	2–0	1–0
Daegu FC	1–1	1–2	—	2–2	0–3	2–1	1–3	1–3	0–0	2–1	0–3	2–2	1–1	1–0	0–1
Daejeon Citizen	3–2	1–0	2–0	—	0–2	2–2	3–1	0–0	1–1	1–0	0–2	0–0	1–2	0–0	1–0
FC Seoul	2–2	1–1	0–0	3–0	—	1–2	2–1	2–1	5–1	2–1	2–1	1–0	1–0	1–0	0–2
Gangwon FC	1–1	3–3	2–2	1–2	1–3	—	2–2	0–4	3–2	1–0	1–3	1–2	4–1	1–1	1–2
Gwangju Sangmu	0–1	1–2	0–1	3–0	1–0	3–1	—	0–0	1–0	0–1	2–3	2–3	2–3	0–3	2–1
Gyeongnam FC	3–1	4–1	3–0	1–1	1–1	1–0	2–1	—	0–2	0–0	1–1	0–2	4–1	0–0	1–1
Incheon United	1–0	1–1	2–1	2–1	0–1	2–0	1–0	1–2	—	3–3	0–1	1–4	1–0	0–0	0–0
Jeju United	2–0	1–1	0–0	1–0	0–2	0–1	1–0	1–1	0–2	—	0–5	1–8	1–2	1–0	0–1
Jeonbuk Hyundai Motors	3–1	2–0	2–0	4–2	2–0	2–5	2–0	4–2	0–0	4–2	—	1–3	4–1	1–1	1–1
Pohang Steelers	1–1	2–1	3–0	2–2	3–2	1–0	2–1	1–1	2–2	2–2	1–1	—	1–1	1–0	1–1
Seongnam Ilhwa Chunma	0–0	3–1	3–0	1–2	1–0	3–0	0–1	3–1	1–1	2–0	3–1	3–1	—	3–2	0–0
Suwon Samsung Bluewings	2–0	1–4	1–0	1–0	2–0	3–3	0–2	3–1	1–2	0–1	1–1	2–3	1–0	—	1–0
Ulsan Hyundai	3–1	1–1	3–1	1–1	1–2	3–4	2–0	0–1	0–1	1–2	0–1	2–2	0–0	3–2	—

Source: K League
Legend: Blue = home team win; Yellow = draw; Red = away team win.

== Championship playoffs ==
=== Bracket ===
First round
3	FC Seoul	1 (2)
6	Jeonnam Dragons (p)	1 (3)
4	Seongnam Ilhwa Chunma (p)	1 (3)
5	Incheon United	1 (2)

Second round
Seongnam Ilhwa Chunma	1
Jeonnam Dragons	0

Semifinal
2	Pohang Steelers	0
Seongnam Ilhwa Chunma	1

Final
1	Jeonbuk Hyundai Motors	0	3	3
Seongnam Ilhwa Chunma	0	1	1

=== Final table ===
Pos	Team	Qualification
1	Jeonbuk Hyundai Motors (C)	Qualification for the Champions League
2	Seongnam Ilhwa Chunma	Qualification for the Champions League
3	Pohang Steelers	Qualification for the Champions League
4	Jeonnam Dragons	
5	FC Seoul	
6	Incheon United	

Source: RSSSF
(C) Champions

== Top scorers ==
This list includes goals of the championship playoffs. The official top goalscorer was decided with records of only regular season, and Lee Dong-gook won the award with 20 goals.

Rank	Scorer	Club	Goals	Apps
1	(South Korea) Lee Dong-gook	Jeonbuk Hyundai Motors	21	29
2	(Montenegro) Dejan Damjanović	FC Seoul	14	23
3	(Brazil) Adriano Chuva	Jeonnam Dragons	13	25
3	(South Korea) Kim Young-hoo	Gangwon FC	13	27
5	(South Korea) Yoo Byung-soo	Incheon United	12	26
5	(South Korea) Kim Dong-chan	Gyeongnam FC	12	27
7	(South Korea) Ko Chang-hyun	Daejeon Citizen	10	19
8	(South Korea) Choi Tae-uk	Jeonbuk Hyundai Motors	9	26
8	(South Korea) Choi Sung-kuk	Gwangju Sangmu	9	26
8	(Brazil) Índio	Gyeongnam FC	9	27
8	(South Korea) Kim Myung-joong	Gwangju Sangmu; Pohang Steelers	9	27

== Awards ==
=== Main awards ===
The K League Players' Player of the Year was published by Korean edition of FourFourTwo in summer, and was not an official award of the K League, but 143 players participated in the selection process.

Award	Winner	Club
Most Valuable Player	(South Korea) Lee Dong-gook	Jeonbuk Hyundai Motors
Top goalscorer	(South Korea) Lee Dong-gook	Jeonbuk Hyundai Motors
Top assist provider	(Brazil) Luiz Henrique	Jeonbuk Hyundai Motors
Rookie of the Year	(South Korea) Kim Young-hoo	Gangwon FC
FANtastic Player	(South Korea) Lee Dong-gook	Jeonbuk Hyundai Motors
Manager of the Year	(South Korea) Choi Kang-hee	Jeonbuk Hyundai Motors
Special Award	(South Korea) Kim Young-kwang	Ulsan Hyundai
Special Award	(South Korea) Kim Byung-ji	Gyeongnam FC
Goal of the Year	(South Korea) Kim Dong-chan	Gyeongnam FC
Best Referee	(South Korea) Choi Gwang-bo	—
Best Assistant Referee	(South Korea) Won Chang-ho	—
Team of the Year	Jeonbuk Hyundai Motors	
Fair Play Award	Gangwon FC	
Youth Team of the Year	Gwangyang Jecheol High School (Jeonnam Dragons)	
Merit Award	Pohang Steelers	
Players' Player of the Year	(South Korea) Ki Sung-yueng	FC Seoul

=== Best XI ===
Position	Winner	Club
Goalkeeper	(South Korea) Shin Hwa-yong	Pohang Steelers
Defenders	(South Korea) Kim Sang-sik	Jeonbuk Hyundai Motors
Defenders	(South Korea) Hwang Jae-won	Pohang Steelers
Defenders	(South Korea) Kim Hyung-il	Pohang Steelers
Defenders	(South Korea) Choi Hyo-jin	Pohang Steelers
Midfielders	(South Korea) Ki Sung-yueng	FC Seoul
Midfielders	(South Korea) Kim Jung-woo	Seongnam Ilhwa Chunma
Midfielders	(Brazil) Eninho	Jeonbuk Hyundai Motors
Midfielders	(South Korea) Choi Tae-uk	Jeonbuk Hyundai Motors
Forwards	(South Korea) Lee Dong-gook	Jeonbuk Hyundai Motors
Forwards	(Brazil) Denilson	Pohang Steelers

== Attendance ==
Team	Stadium	Matches	Highest	Lowest	Average
Suwon Samsung Bluewings	Big Bird Stadium	14	35,058	10,206	18,583
FC Seoul	Seoul World Cup Stadium	14	36,764	7,685	16,779
Gangwon FC	Gangneung Stadium	10	21,316	5,129	14,787
Gangwon FC	Chuncheon Stadium	4	21,316	5,129	14,787
Jeonbuk Hyundai Motors	Jeonju World Cup Stadium	14	21,516	10,756	14,227
Jeonnam Dragons	Gwang-Yang Stadium	13	19,800	10,420	13,263
Jeonnam Dragons	Suncheon Stadium	1	19,800	10,420	13,263
Gyeongnam FC	Changwon Civil Stadium	10	21,947	5,764	12,269
Gyeongnam FC	Masan Stadium	1	21,947	5,764	12,269
Gyeongnam FC	Miryang Stadium	1	21,947	5,764	12,269
Gyeongnam FC	Geochang Stadium	1	21,947	5,764	12,269
Gyeongnam FC	Yangsan Stadium	1	21,947	5,764	12,269
Pohang Steelers	Pohang Steelyard	14	16,382	7,348	11,041
Incheon United	Incheon World Cup Stadium	14	34,275	2,315	10,499
Ulsan Hyundai	Ulsan Munsu Stadium	14	13,761	3,864	9,188
Daejeon Citizen	Daejeon World Cup Stadium	14	16,561	3,535	8,596
Daegu FC	Daegu Stadium	12	32,250	3,201	8,541
Daegu FC	Daegu Civil Stadium	2	32,250	3,201	8,541
Seongnam Ilhwa Chunma	Seongnam Sports Complex	14	17,049	1,367	7,917
Jeju United	Jeju World Cup Stadium	14	32,765	1,753	7,757
Gwangju Sangmu	Gwangju World Cup Stadium	13	25,762	2,873	7,719
Gwangju Sangmu	Yeonggwang Sportium	1	25,762	2,873	7,719
Busan IPark	Asiad Main Stadium	14	17,577	3,998	7,221
Total		210	36,764	1,367	11,226

Source: K League (in Korean)

== See also ==
- 2009 in South Korean football
- 2009 K League Championship
- 2009 Korean League Cup
- 2009 Korean FA Cup
