= Valeriy Lobanovskyi Memorial Tournament =

International football competition

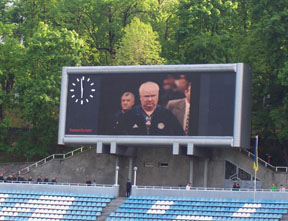
Valery Lobanovsky's image on the scoreboard during the 2007 Memorial Tournament

Valeriy Lobanovskyi Memorial Tournament (Ukrainian: Турнір Пам'яті Валерія Лобановського, romanized: Turnir Pamiati Valeriia Lobanovskoho) is an international football tournament established in honour and memory of Valeriy Lobanovskyi since his death on 13 May 2002, hence the name Memorial. The idea was initiated by the FC Dynamo Kyiv management and the tournament is played at the Valeriy Lobanovskyi Dynamo Stadium in Kyiv, Ukraine.

== General rules ==
Since 2005, the tournament participants are a group of four selected national teams. From 2006 the tournament participants have been the Under-21 National Teams. The teams start-off in semifinals and the winners go on to play in the final; the other two teams play for the 3rd place.

In 2009 two games of the tournament were played at Boreks Stadium, Borodianka in Kyiv Oblast.

In 2011 two games of the U-21 international tournament were played at Obolon Arena.

In 2012 two games of the tournament were played at Bannikov Stadium.

== Champions and top goalscorers ==
Season	Champion	Runner-up	Third place	Fourth place	Top Goalscorer(s)	
As clubs tournament
2003	(Ukraine) Dynamo Kyiv	(Ukraine) Shakhtar Donetsk	(Russia) CSKA Moscow	(Russia) Lokomotiv Moscow	(Brazil) Diogo Rincón	2 goals
2004	(Ukraine) Dynamo Kyiv	(Moldova) Sheriff Tiraspol	(Latvia) Skonto Riga	(Georgia (country)) Dinamo Tbilisi	(Uzbekistan) Maksim Shatskikh	2 goals
As senior national teams tournament
2005	Poland	Israel	Ukraine	Serbia and Montenegro	(Poland) Grzegorz Rasiak	3 goals
As youth national teams tournament
2006	Israel U21	Belarus U21	Ukraine U21	Moldova U21	(Belarus) Kiril Pavlyuchek	3 goals
2007	Israel U21	Serbia U21	Ukraine U21	Moldova U21	(Israel) Itay Shechter	2 goals
2008	Poland U21	Bulgaria U21	Ukraine U21	Northern Ireland U21	(Poland) Marcin Wodecki	2 goals
2008	Poland U21	Bulgaria U21	Ukraine U21	Northern Ireland U21	(Ukraine) Serhiy Kravchenko	2 goals
2009	Ukraine U21	Turkey U21	Germany U21	Iran U21	Nine players	1 goal
2010	Russia U20	Iran U20	Ukraine U20	Turkey U20	(Ukraine) Andriy Bohdanov	2 goals
2011	Uzbekistan U23	Ukraine U21	Serbia U21	Israel U21	Five players	1 goal
2012	Slovakia U21	Montenegro U20	Ukraine U20	Belarus U20	Seven players	1 goal
2013	Austria U21	Ukraine U21	Czech Republic U21	Slovenia U21	(Austria) Toni Vastić	2 goals
2014	Cancelled					
2015	Slovenia U21	Ukraine U21	Greece U21	Moldova U21	(Slovenia) Luka Zahović	2 goals
2015	Slovenia U21	Ukraine U21	Greece U21	Moldova U21	(Greece) Nikolaos Ioannidis	2 goals
2016	Israel U21	Serbia U21	Ukraine U21	Austria U21	Fourteen players	1 goal
2017	Finland U21	Ukraine U21	Montenegro U21	Slovenia U21	(Montenegro) Nikola Krstović	2 goals
2018	Slovenia U21	Israel U21	Greece U21	Ukraine U19	(Slovenia) Jan Mlakar	3 goals
2019	Ukraine U21	Israel U21	Bulgaria U21	Cyprus U21	Six players	1 goal
2020	Cancelled due to the COVID-19 pandemic in Ukraine.					
2021	Uzbekistan U21	Azerbaijan U21	Ukraine U21	—N/a	Four players	1 goal

== Performance among national teams ==
Legend

- 1st – Champions
- 2nd – Runners-up
- 3rd – Third place
- 4th – Fourth place

Team	2005	2006	2007	2008	2009	2010	2011	2012	2013	2015	2016	2017	2018	2019	2021	Total
Austria									1st		4th					2
Azerbaijan															2nd	1
Belarus		2nd						4th								2
Bulgaria				2nd										3rd		2
Cyprus														4th		1
Czech Republic									3rd							1
Finland												1st				1
Germany					3rd											1
Greece										3rd			3rd			2
Iran					4th	2nd										2
Israel	2nd	1st	1st				4th				1st		2nd	2nd		7
Moldova		4th	4th							4th						3
Montenegro								2nd				3rd				2
Northern Ireland				4th												1
Poland	1st			1st												2
Russia						1st										1
Serbia	4th		2nd				3rd				2nd					4
Slovakia								1st								1
Slovenia									4th	1st		4th	1st			4
Turkey					2nd	4th										2
Ukraine	3rd	3rd	3rd	3rd	1st	3rd	2nd	3rd	2nd	2nd	3rd	2nd	4th	1st	3rd	15
Uzbekistan							1st								1st	2

== Stadiums ==
- Valeriy Lobanovskyi Dynamo Stadium – 12 (2005, 2006, 2007, 2009, 2010, 2011, 2012, 2013, 2015, 2016, 2017, 2018)
- Bannikov Stadium – 10 (2006, 2007, 2008, 2010, 2012, 2013, 2015, 2016, 2019, 2021)
- Obolon Arena – 4 (2011, 2013, 2016, 2021)
- Systema Stadium (Borodyanka) – 2 (2009, 2010)
- Kolos Stadium (Boryspil) – 2 (2017, 2018)
- Olimpiyskiy National Sports Complex – 1 (2019)

== Notes and references ==
=== Notes ===
1. The player of the Ukrainian club Dynamo Kyiv, who was also declared champion.
2. Initially scheduled to take place in Donetsk, but due to the war in Donbas it was suspended and transferred to Kyiv before cancelled completely after withdrawal of the Iran U21.
