= Wodecki =

Wodecki (feminine: Wodecka) is a Polish surname. Notable people with the surname include:

- Marcin Wodecki (born 1988), Polish footballer
- Zbigniew Wodecki (1950–2017), Polish singer-songwriter

== See also ==
- Wadecki
