= Szymon Kaźmierowski =

Polish footballer

Personal information
- Full name: Szymon Kaźmierowski
- Date of birth: 22 July 1987 (age 39)
- Place of birth: Poznań, Poland
- Height: 1.84 m (6 ft 0 in)
- Position: Forward

Senior career*
Years	Team	Apps	(Gls)
2005–2008	Dyskobolia Grodzisk	22	(2)
2008–2010	Polonia Warsaw	2	(1)
2010	→ Warta Poznań (loan)	14	(3)
2011–2012	Chojniczanka Chojnice	46	(10)
2012–2013	Stomil Olsztyn	41	(7)
2014	Stal Rzeszów	13	(3)
2014–2017	Formacja Port 2000 Mostki	75	(16)
2017	Orzeł Międzyrzecz	14	(14)
2018	Grom Plewiska	12	(6)
2018	Orzeł Międzyrzecz	2	(0)
Total		241	(62)
- * Club domestic league appearances and goals

Szymon Kazmierowski (born 22 July 1987) is a Polish former professional footballer who played as a forward.

== Honours ==
Dyskobolia Grodzisk

- Polish Cup: 2006–07
- Ekstraklasa Cup: 2006–07, 2007–08

Formacja Most 2000 Mostki

- III liga Lower Silesia–Lubusz: 2014–15
