= Jakub Kaszuba =

Jakub Kaszuba may refer to:

- Jakub Kaszuba (fighter) (born 1995), Polish mixed martial artist
- Jakub Kaszuba (footballer) (born 1988), Polish footballer
