= Jan Cios =

Polish footballer

Personal information
- Full name: Jan Cios
- Date of birth: 22 August 1976 (age 50)
- Place of birth: Biłgoraj, Poland
- Height: 1.84 m (6 ft 1/2 in)
- Position: Defender

Youth career
- Tanew Majdan Stary
- Tomasovia Tomaszów Lubelski
- Łada Biłgoraj

Senior career*
Years	Team	Apps	(Gls)
1995–1996	Hetman Zamość		
1997–1998	Stal Stalowa Wola		
1998–1999	Hetman Zamość		
1999–2000	Stal Stalowa Wola		
2000–2002	Hetman Zamość		
2002–2003	Odra Wodzisław	22	(1)
2004–2005	Świt Nowy Dwór Mazowiecki	45	(3)
2005–2006	Arka Gdynia	5	(0)
2006	Górnik Zabrze	14	(0)
2007	Świt Nowy Dwór Mazowiecki		
2007–2008	Kmita Zabierzów	41	(5)
2008–2009	Narew Ostrołęka	10	(1)
2009	Sandecja Nowy Sącz	10	(0)
2009–2012	LKS Nieciecza	51	(9)
2012–2013	Żyrardowianka Żyrardów		
2013–2014	Wisła Zakroczym		
2014	Wkra Pomiechówek		
2014	Świt Nowy Dwór Mazowiecki	8	(0)
2016	UKS Łady		
2016	Olender Sól		
2019–2020	Wkra Sochocin	4	(3)
2020–2023	Lotnisko Modlin	24	(10)
- * Club domestic league appearances and goals

Jan Cios (born 22 August 1976) is a Polish former professional footballer who played as a defender.

== Honours ==
LKS Nieciecza

- II liga East: 2009–10
