= Wadecki =

Wadecki is a surname. Notable people with the surname include:

- Adam Wadecki (born 1977), Polish cyclist, brother of Piotr
- Piotr Wadecki (born 1973), Polish cyclist

== See also ==
- Wodecki
