= Michał Pulkowski =

Polish footballer

Personal information
- Full name: Michał Pulkowski
- Date of birth: 1 January 1979 (age 47)
- Place of birth: Warsaw, Poland
- Height: 1.78 m (5 ft 10 in)
- Position: Midfielder

Senior career*
Years	Team	Apps	(Gls)
1997–1998	Agrykola Warsaw		
1998–1999	Marcovia Marki		
1999–2000	Mazur Karczew		
2000–2001	Korona Góra Kalwaria		
2001–2002	Hutnik Warsaw		
2002–2003	Mazur Karczew		
2003–2004	Legia Warsaw II		
2004	Świt NDM	14	(0)
2005	Znicz Pruszków		
2005–2011	Ruch Chorzów	147	(6)
2011–2012	Dolcan Ząbki	26	(2)

Managerial career
- 2012–2014: Dolcan Ząbki (assistant)
- 2014–2015: Cracovia (assistant)
- 2015: Podbeskidzie (assistant)
- 2016–2017: Ursus Warsaw
- 2017–2019: Dolcan/Ząbkovia Ząbki
- 2019–2020: Ursus Warsaw
- 2021–2022: Błonianka Błonie
- 2022: Broń Radom
- 2023: Raków Częstochowa II (assistant)
- 2023: Raków Częstochowa II
- 2024–2025: Błonianka Błonie
- * Club domestic league appearances and goals

Michał Pulkowski (born 1 January 1979) is a Polish professional football manager and former player who played as a midfielder. He was most recently in charge of IV liga Masovia club Błonianka Błonie.

== Career ==
Michał Pulkowski played for Ruch Chorzów from 2005 to 2011, making 147 appearances and scoring 6 goals.

During his time with Ruch Chorzów, he helped the team win the II liga in the 2006–07 season.

In May 2011, after being released from Ruch Chorzów, he joined Dolcan Ząbki in July 2011, where he made 26 appearances and scored 2 goals.

In July 2011, he joined Dolcan Ząbki.

Pulkowski transitioned into management after his playing career. He has held various managerial and assistant roles, including positions at Dolcan Ząbki, Cracovia, Podbeskidzie, Ursus Warsaw, and Błonianka Błonie.
