= Aleksandar Petrović (footballer, born 1983) =

Serbian footballer

Personal information
- Full name: Aleksandar Petrović
- Date of birth: 22 March 1983 (age 43)
- Place of birth: Belgrade, SFR Yugoslavia
- Height: 1.84 m (6 ft 1/2 in)
- Position: Right back

Senior career*
Years	Team	Apps	(Gls)
2000–2003	Partizan	1	(0)
2000–2003	→ Teleoptik (loan)	48	(3)
2003–2004	Čukarički	35	(1)
2005	Borac Čačak	13	(0)
2005–2006	Voždovac	11	(0)
2006–2008	Smederevo	45	(1)
2008–2009	Jeonbuk Hyundai Motors	19	(0)
2009	Chunnam Dragons	6	(1)
2010–2011	Čukarički	18	(0)
2011	Petrolul Ploiești	9	(0)
2012	Concordia Chiajna	8	(0)
2012–2014	ACS Poli Timișoara	26	(2)
2014	IMT		
2015	Dinamo Pančevo		
2015–2016	Jedinstvo Stara Pazova		
2016	Național Sebiș		
- * Club domestic league appearances and goals as of April 9, 2016

Aleksandar Petrović (Serbian Cyrillic: Александар Петровић; born 22 March 1983), is a Serbian retired footballer who played as a right-back.

== Career ==
He had previously played with Serbian clubs FK Partizan, FK Teleoptik, FK Borac Čačak, FK Voždovac, FK Smederevo, and Korean K-League clubs Jeonbuk Hyundai Motors and Chunnam Dragons.

== Position ==
He can be deployed as either a right-back, his preferred position, or as a left-wing midfield player.

== Background ==
Petrović is often known simply by his nickname, Alex.

== Honours ==
Jeonbuk Hyundai Motors

- K League 1: 2009
