= Młoda Ekstraklasa =

- Logo used from 2011 to 2013
- Founded: 2007
- Folded: 2013
- Replaced by: Central Junior League
- Owner: Ekstraklasa
- No. of teams: 16
- Country: Poland
- Continent: UEFA
- Last champion: Legia Warsaw (2nd title)
- Most titles: Legia Warsaw, Zagłębie Lubin (2 titles)

Młoda Ekstraklasa (Polish pronunciation: [ˈmwɔda ɛkstraˈklasa], official abbreviation MESA [Polish pronunciation: [ˈmɛsa] or (rarely) [ˈɛm ˈɛ ˈɛs ˈa]]; literally in English: The Young Ekstraklasa) was a Polish youth football league composed of the top youth teams of the 16 Ekstraklasa sides. The games were organized with the aim of encouraging enhanced scouting and youth development in Poland and to provide regular competitive games for young players who often struggled to get playing time in the first team.

== Competition format ==
It was contested by players 21 years of age and under, however, each side was allowed three players over the age limit (for the 2007–08 season: players born January 1, 1986, and after). In general, the matches took place a day after the two clubs' first teams have faced off, however the venues were switched. The team with the most points at the end of the season received the title of Młoda Ekstraklasa Champion.

== History ==
Bogdan Basałaj came up with the idea of creating a tournament in Poland for this age group, when he was still the President of the Wisła Kraków's board. He was inspired by Adam Nawałka, who returned to the club from his coaching internship at AS Roma and told his boss about the Italian Campionato Nazionale Primavera (the tournament for young players, directly supporting Serie A).

In the first ever game, played on July 28, 2007, at the Stadion Śląski in Chorzów, Ruch Chorzów fell to visiting Dyskobolia Grodzisk (1–2). Ruch's Łukasz Janoszka scored the first ever goal. On May 18, 2008, Wisła Kraków clinched the first title, with a 1–0 win at home against runners-up Korona Kielce. Marcin Wodecki of Górnik Zabrze was the top goalscorer with 17 goals, closely followed by Ruch Chorzów's Artur Sobiech with 16 goals.

On March 20, 2013, at the meeting of the management board of Ekstraklasa SA, a decision was made to stop playing the games of the Młoda Ekstraklasa (2012–13 season was to be the last one) and to create the Central Junior League.

== Season-by-season ==
Edition	Season	Number of teams	Winner	Runner-up	Third place	Top scorer
I	2007–08	15	Wisła Kraków	Korona Kielce	Cracovia	17 goals – Marcin Wodecki (Górnik Zabrze)
II	2008–09	16	Ruch Chorzów	Wisła Kraków	Polonia Warsaw	21 goals – Kamil Biliński (Śląsk Wrocław)
III	2009–10	16	Zagłębie Lubin	Legia Warsaw	Lech Poznań	13 goals – Jakub Kaszuba (Cracovia)
IV	2010–11	16	Zagłębie Lubin	Legia Warsaw	Ruch Chorzów	15 goals – Łukasz Teodorczyk (Polonia Warsaw)
V	2011–12	16	Legia Warsaw	Zagłębie Lubin	Śląsk Wrocław	14 goals – Michał Grunt (Polonia Warsaw)
VI	2012–13	16	Legia Warsaw	Lech Poznań	Śląsk Wrocław	13 goals - Kamil Zieliński (Pogoń Szczecin)
