= Yevhen Radionov =

Ukrainian footballer

Personal information
- Full name: Yevhen Viktorovych Radionov
- Date of birth: 6 March 1990 (age 36)
- Place of birth: Ukrainian SSR
- Height: 1.86 m (6 ft 1 in)
- Position: Forward

Youth career
- 2004–2007: Mriya Kupiansk

Senior career*
Years	Team	Apps	(Gls)
2007–2008	Illichivets-2 Mariupol	28	(1)
2009	Stal Dniprodzerzhynsk	0	(0)
2010	Kremin Kremenchuk	9	(0)
2011	Kryształ Glinojeck		
2011–2012	Ursus Warsaw	33	(17)
2013	GKS Katowice	15	(0)
2014–2015	Ursus Warsaw	36	(13)
2015–2016	Świt Nowy Dwór Mazowiecki	24	(13)
2016–2019	ŁKS Łódź	80	(34)
2020–2021	Puszcza Niepołomice	28	(9)
2021–2022	GKS Bełchatów	8	(0)
2022–2023	Świt Nowy Dwór Mazowiecki	46	(15)
2023–2024	Legionovia Legionowo	19	(3)
2024–2025	Polonia Warsaw II	23	(22)
2025	Polonia Warsaw III	13	(9)
- * Club domestic league appearances and goals as of 20:45, 2 July 2026 (UTC)

Yevhen Viktorovych Radionov (born 6 March 1990) is a Ukrainian professional footballer who plays as a forward.

== Career ==
As a youth player, Radionov trialed for the youth academy of Ukrainian top flight side Dnipro.

Before the second half of the 2010–11 season, he signed for Kryształ Glinojeck in the Polish fourth division from Ukrainian third division club Kremin.

In early 2013, Radionov moved from III liga outfit team Ursus Warsaw to Polish I liga side GKS Katowice, where he made 15 league appearances and scored no goals.

In 2016, he signed for III liga club ŁKS Łódź, helping them achieve three consecutive promotions in three seasons.

Before the second half of the 2019–20 season, Radionov joined Polish second division outfit Puszcza Niepołomice.

== Honours ==
Ursus Warsaw

- III liga Łódź–Masovia: 2013–14

Polonia Warsaw II

- Polish Cup (Warsaw regionals): 2024–25
