= Piotr Bagnicki =

Polish footballer (born 1980)

Personal information
- Date of birth: 10 December 1980 (age 45)
- Place of birth: Kraków, Poland
- Height: 1.88 m (6 ft 2 in)
- Position: Striker

Team information
- Current team: Wanda Kraków
- Number: 9

Youth career
- Armatura Kraków

Senior career*
Years	Team	Apps	(Gls)
1998–2002	Cracovia	85	(6)
2002–2003	Proszowianka Proszowice		
2003–2006	Kmita Zabierzów		
2006–2007	Korona Kielce	15	(2)
2007–2008	Zagłębie Sosnowiec	10	(1)
2008–2008	Kmita Zabierzów	33	(8)
2009	Odra Wodzisław	4	(0)
2009–2010	Podbeskidzie Bielsko-Biała	30	(6)
2010	Sandecja Nowy Sącz	5	(0)
2011	Świt Krzeszowice		
2011	Borek Kraków		
2012	Jałowiec Stryszawa		
2012–2013	Borek Kraków		
2014–2015	Skawinka Skawina		
2016	Jordan Sum Zakliczyn		
2016–2020	Halniak Maków Podhalański		
2020–2023	Wróblowianka Wróblowice	51	(28)
2023–	Wanda Kraków	63	(48)
- * Club domestic league appearances and goals as of 22:04, 30 June 2026 (UTC)

Piotr Bagnicki (born 10 December 1980) is a Polish footballer who plays as a striker for regional league club Wanda Kraków.

== Honours ==
Skawinka Skawina

- Regional league Kraków II: 2014–15

Individual

- Polish Cup top scorer: 2006–07
