= Kim Chang-hee (footballer, born 1986) =

South Korean footballer (born 1986)

Kim Chang-Hee
Personal information
- Full name: Kim Chang-Hee
- Date of birth: 5 December 1986 (age 39)
- Place of birth: South Korea
- Height: 1.81 m (5 ft 11 in)
- Position: Midfielder

Youth career
- 2005–2008: Konkuk University

Senior career*
Years	Team	Apps	(Gls)
2009–2010	Daegu FC	11	(0)
2011	Daejeon KHNP	11	(0)
2012–2014	Incheon Korail	30	(7)
- * Club domestic league appearances and goals as of 27 April 2012

- Kim Chang-hee
- Hangul: 김창희
- Hanja: 金昌熙
- RR: Gim Changhui
- MR: Kim Ch'anghŭi

Kim Chang-Hee (Korean: 김창희; born 5 December 1986) is a South Korean football midfielder.

Another player called Kim Chang-Hee (born 8 June 1987) also played in the K-League around the same time as this one, for Gangwon FC.

== Club career ==
Kim Chang-hee was drafted from Konkuk University for Daegu FC's 2009 season. He played a limited role in the season, participating in 11 games during the 2009 K-League. After failing to feature at all during the 2010 season, Kim was released. He subsequently joined Daejeon KHNP, who play in the Korea National League, the semi-professional football tier below the K-League.

== Club career statistics ==
Club performance			League		Cup		League Cup		Total	
Season	Club	League	Apps	Goals	Apps	Goals	Apps	Goals	Apps	Goals
South Korea			League		KFA Cup		League Cup		Total	
2009	Daegu FC	K-League	11	0	3	0	1	0	15	0
2010	Daegu FC	K-League	0	0	0	0	0	0	0	0
Career total			11	0	3	0	1	0	15	0
