= Piotr Szymiczek =

Polish footballer (born 1982)

Personal information
- Full name: Piotr Szymiczek
- Date of birth: 21 May 1982 (age 44)
- Place of birth: Wodzisław Śląski, Poland
- Height: 1.80 m (5 ft 11 in)
- Position: Defender

Youth career
- Unia Turza Śląska

Senior career*
Years	Team	Apps	(Gls)
1997–2002	Odra Wodzisław II		
2003–2009	Odra Wodzisław	47	(0)
2009–2010	Stal Stalowa Wola	30	(3)
2010	Kolejarz Stróże	14	(0)
2011	Świt Nowy Dwór Mazowiecki	16	(0)
2011–2014	Polonia Marklowice		
2015–2018	Unia Turza Śląska		
2018–2020	Odra Wodzisław	42	(5)
2020–2021	Unia Turza Śląska	25	(1)
2021	LKS Krzyżanowice	15	(4)
2024–2025	Unia Turza Śląska II	11	(1)
- * Club domestic league appearances and goals as of 22:30, 24 June 2025 (UTC)

Piotr Szymiczek (born 21 May 1982) is a Polish footballer who plays as a defender.

== Career ==
In February 2011, he joined Świt Nowy Dwór Mazowiecki.

== Honours ==
Unia Turza Śląska

- IV liga Silesia II: 2015–16
- Polish Cup (Racibórz regionals): 2019–20

Odra Wodzisław

- Regional league Katowice III: 2018–19
- Polish Cup (Rybnik regionals): 2018–19
