= Cho Jun-ho (footballer) =

South Korean footballer and coach

Cho Jun-Ho
Personal information
- Full name: Cho Jun-Ho
- Date of birth: 28 April 1973 (age 53)
- Place of birth: South Korea
- Height: 1.83 m (6 ft 0 in)
- Position: Goalkeeper

Youth career
- 1995–1998: Hongik University

Senior career*
Years	Team	Apps	(Gls)
1996–1998	Korea Housing & Commercial Bank FC	?	(?)
1999–2003	Pohang Steelers	46	(0)
2004–2008	Bucheon SK / Jeju United	99	(0)
2009–2010	Daegu FC	14	(0)
Total		159	(0)

International career
2006	South Korea	0	(0)

Managerial career
- 2010–2013: Daegu FC (goalkeeper coach)
- 2014–2019: FC Seoul U-15 Team (goalkeeper coach)
- 2019–2021: Chiangrai United (goalkeeper coach)
- 2022–2024: Malaysia (goalkeeper coach)
- 2025: Ulsan HD (goalkeeper coach)
- 2026–: Selangor (goalkeeper coach)
- * Club domestic league appearances and goals as of 27 February 2014

- Cho Jun-ho
- Hangul: 조준호
- Hanja: 趙俊浩
- RR: Jo Junho
- MR: Cho Chunho

Cho Jun-Ho (Korean: 조준호; born 28 April 1973) is a South Korean former professional footballer who played as a goalkeeper and currently is the goalkeeper coach of Malaysia Super League club Selangor.

== Club career ==
Cho made his professional debut in 1999, turning out for the Pohang Steelers. He then transferred to Bucheon SK in 2004. Bucheon SK subsequently relocated to Jeju Island, rebranding itself as Jeju United. Cho played 99 games for the side. For 2009, Cho moved to Daegu FC, where he spent 2 seasons and played just 14 games. He retired at the end of the 2010 season, without having played a match during the season. He quit play but remained as goalkeeping coach until the 2011 season.

== International career ==
In January, 2006, he was selected as a squad member for the South Korea national team, but has not played at international level. He was a substitute in an exhibition game against Los Angeles Galaxy.

== Club career statistics ==
As of 16 February 2011

Club performance			League		Cup		League Cup		Continental		Total	
Season	Club	League	Apps	Goals	Apps	Goals	Apps	Goals	Apps	Goals	Apps	Goals
South Korea			League		KFA Cup		League Cup		Asia		Total	
1999	Pohang Steelers	K-League	12	0	?	?	8	0	?	?		
2000	Pohang Steelers	K-League	20	0	?	?	10	0	-			
2001	Pohang Steelers	K-League	6	0	?	?	5	0	-			
2002	Pohang Steelers	K-League	6	0	?	?	0	0	-			
2003	Pohang Steelers	K-League	2	0	3	0	-		-		5	0
2004	Bucheon SK	K-League	24	0	5	0	12	0	-		41	0
2005	Bucheon SK	K-League	24	0	0	0	12	0	-		36	0
2006	Jeju United	K-League	21	0	0	0	12	0	-		33	0
2007	Jeju United	K-League	9	0	2	0	6	0	-		17	0
2008	Jeju United	K-League	21	0	1	0	6	0	-		28	0
2009	Daegu FC	K-League	14	0	0	0	0	0	-		14	0
2010	Daegu FC	K-League	0	0	0	0	0	0	-		0	0
Career total			159	0	11	0	71	0	0	0	241	0
