= Sobczyk =

Sobczyk is a Polish surname. Notable people with the surname include:

- Agata Sobczyk (born 1988), Polish politician
- Alex Sobczyk (born 1997), Austrian footballer
- Katarzyna Sobczyk (1945–2010), Polish singer

== See also ==
- Sobczyk's theorem
- Sobczak
