= Han Jung-hwa =

South Korean footballer (born 1982)

Han Jung-Hwa
Personal information
- Full name: Han Jung-Hwa
- Date of birth: 31 October 1982 (age 44)
- Place of birth: South Korea
- Height: 1.72 m (5 ft 8 in)
- Position: Midfielder

Youth career
- Anyang High School

Senior career*
| Years | Team | Apps | (Gls) |
| 2001–2006 | Anyang LG Cheetahs / FC Seoul | 16 | (0) |
| 2004–2005 | → Gwangju Sangmu (military service) | 2 | (0) |
| 2007–2010 | Busan IPark | 40 | (4) |
| 2009 | → Daegu FC (loan) | 15 | (0) |
| 2010–2011 | Goyang KB Kookmin Bank | 28 | (4) |
- * Club domestic league appearances and goals as of 2 March 2012

Han Jung-Hwa (Korean: 한정화; born 31 October 1982) is a South Korean football midfielder.

Jung-Hwa's previous clubs are FC Seoul, Gwangju Sangmu. In the 2009 season, he was loaned out to Daegu FC for one year. In July 2010, he joined Goyang Kookmin Bank FC after being released from Busan I'Park.
