= Michał Grunt =

Polish footballer (born 1993)

Personal information
- Full name: Michał Grunt
- Date of birth: 10 September 1993 (age 33)
- Place of birth: Sosnowiec, Poland
- Height: 1.90 m (6 ft 3 in)
- Position: Forward

Youth career
- 2009–2011: Zagłębie Sosnowiec

Senior career*
Years	Team	Apps	(Gls)
2011–2013	Zagłębie Sosnowiec	18	(1)
2012	→ Polonia Warsaw (loan)	0	(0)
2013–2016	Braga B	9	(1)
2014	→ GKS Katowice (loan)	0	(0)
2015	→ Limanovia Limanowa (loan)	8	(0)
2015	→ GKS Tychy (loan)	8	(1)
2016–2019	KSZO Ostrowiec	78	(25)
2019–2020	Motor Lublin	12	(2)
2020	→ KSZO Ostrowiec (loan)	1	(0)
2020–2021	Podhale Nowy Targ	32	(9)
2021–2023	Star Starachowice	42	(30)
2023–2024	Mazur Karczew	29	(11)
- * Club domestic league appearances and goals as of 07:50, 10 July 2024 (UTC)

Michał Grunt (born 10 September 1993) is a Polish professional footballer playing as a forward.

== Club career ==
Born in Sosnowiec, Grunt made his professional debut with local club Zaglebie Sosnowiec, scoring a goal on that match. He then signed for Polonia Warszawa. A lack of first team opportunities saw him return to his old club the following season. He became the topscorer for the reserve team.

On 5 July 2013, he signed for Braga B, playing in Segunda Liga (second tier of Portuguese football) on a four-year contract. On 7 December, he scored his debut goal for his club in a 2–1 defeat to Maritimo B. On 22 August 2016, his contract at Braga was terminated, and he subsequently joined KSZO Ostrowiec Świętokrzyski.

On 28 January 2019, Grunt signed a contract with Motor Lublin. In January 2020 he was loaned out to his former club, KSZO Ostrowiec Świętokrzyski, for the rest of the season. After returning from loan, Grunt moved to Podhale Nowy Targ.

== Honours ==
KSZO Ostrowiec Świętokrzyski

- Polish Cup (Świętokrzyskie regionals): 2018–19, 2019–20

Star Starachowice

- IV liga Świętokrzyskie: 2022–23

Individual

- Młoda Ekstraklasa top scorer: 2011–12
