= Janusz Dziedzic =

Polish footballer

Personal information
- Full name: Janusz Dziedzic
- Date of birth: 17 August 1980 (age 46)
- Place of birth: Dębica, Poland
- Height: 1.80 m (5 ft 11 in)
- Position: Striker

Youth career
- MKS Dębica

Senior career*
Years	Team	Apps	(Gls)
1999–2003	Piotrcovia Piotrków Trybunalski		
1998–1999	→ ŁKS Łódź (loan)	13	(0)
2003	Pogoń Szczecin		
2004–2006	GKS Bełchatów	61	(17)
2006–2007	Arka Gdynia	25	(9)
2007–2010	GKS Bełchatów	27	(5)
2010–2011	GKS Katowice	28	(7)
2011–2012	Olimpia Grudziądz	31	(7)
2012–2014	Wisła Płock	47	(13)
- * Club domestic league appearances and goals

Janusz Dziedzic (born 17 August 1980) is a Polish former professional footballer who played as a striker. He was most recently the sporting director of Zagłębie Sosnowiec.

== Career ==
In July 2011, he joined Olimpia Grudziądz.

== Honours ==
Wisła Płock

- II liga East: 2012–13

Individual

- Polish Cup top scorer: 2006–07
