= Ricardo Costa (footballer, born 1973) =

Portuguese footballer

Personal information
- Full name: Ricardo Alexandre Campos Costa
- Date of birth: 10 January 1973 (age 53)
- Place of birth: Barreiro, Portugal
- Position: Midfielder

Youth career
- 1983–1985: Estrela Amadora
- 1985–1988: Barreirense
- 1988–1989: Quimigal
- 1989–1991: Vitória Setúbal

Senior career*
Years	Team	Apps	(Gls)
1991–1992	União Santiago	18	(1)
1992–1993	Benfica Castelo Branco	23	(7)
1993–1994	Campomaiorense	17	(1)
1994–1997	Benfica Castelo Branco	69	(24)
1997	União de Coimbra	12	(3)
1997–1998	Maia	1	(0)
1998–1999	Trofense	40	(9)
1999	Darlington	3	(1)
1999–2000	Canelas	29	(4)
2000–2001	Benfica Castelo Branco		
2001–2002	Vila Real	14	(0)
2002–2004	Alcains (Note: Source omits 2002–03 season.)	47	(10)
2004–2005	Pampilhosa	8	(0)
2005	Águias do Moradal		
2005–2006	Sertanense		
2006–2007	Penamacorense		
2007–2009	Alcains		
2009–2011	Penamacorense	53	(26)
2011–2012	Oleiros	21	(7)
2012–2014	Atalaia do Campo	29	(10)
- * Club domestic league appearances and goals as of 13 July 2021

Ricardo Alexandre Campos Costa (born 10 January 1973) is a Portuguese footballer who played in the Segunda Divisão de Honra for Maia and Campomaiorense, in the lower divisions for a large number of clubs, mainly in the Castelo Branco district, and in the English Football League Third Division for Darlington.
