= Ireneusz Adamski =

Polish footballer

Personal information
- Date of birth: 22 August 1974 (age 52)
- Place of birth: Polkowice, Poland
- Height: 1.88 m (6 ft 2 in)
- Position: Defender

Team information
- Current team: Cyklon Rogoźnik (manager)

Senior career*
Years	Team	Apps	(Gls)
1992–2000	Śląsk Wrocław		
1995	→ Stal Chocianów (loan)		
1996	→ KP Wałbrzych (loan)		
2001–2005	Górnik Polkowice		
2006	Gawin Królewska Wola		
2006–2009	Ruch Chorzów	57	(0)
2009–2010	Leśnik Kobiór		
2010–2011	LZS Piotrówka	14	(0)
2011–2012	Nadwiślan Góra		
2013–2015	ŁKS Łagiewniki		
2015–2016	Odra Miasteczko Śląskie		
2019	Warta Kamieńskie Młyny		
2019	Unia Kalety		

Managerial career
- 2021: Unia Kalety
- 2022: Przemsza Siewierz
- 2023–: Cyklon Rogoźnik
- * Club domestic league appearances and goals

Ireneusz Adamski (born 22 August 1974) is a Polish football manager and former professional player who played as a defender. He is in charge of Cyklon Rogoźnik.

== Career ==
From 1992 to 2000, Adamski played for Śląsk Wrocław. He made his Ekstraklasa debut for the club on 19 August 1995. In total, he made 25 top-flight appearances for Śląsk, and one Polish Cup appearance.

From 2001 to 2005, he represented Górnik Polkowice. He played his first match on 25 July 2001 in the Polish League Cup. Representing Polkowice, he appeared 11 times in the Ekstraklasa, 50 times in the second division scoring 6 goals, 9 times in the Polish Cup scoring 1 goal, 2 matches in the League Cup, as well as two play-off appearances.

From 2006 to 2009, he played for Ruch Chorzów. In the colors of Ruch he appeared 39 times in the Ekstraklasa, 18 times in the II liga, 12 times in the Polish Cup and 10 times in the Ekstraklasa Cup.

== Honours ==
Ruch Chorzów

- II liga: 2006–07
