= Lazar Popović =

Serbian footballer (born 1983)

Personal information
- Date of birth: 10 January 1983 (age 43)
- Place of birth: Belgrade, SFR Yugoslavia
- Height: 1.91 m (6 ft 3 in)
- Position: Striker

Youth career
- 1995–2000: Čukarički

Senior career*
Years	Team	Apps	(Gls)
2002–2005	Čukarički	70	(24)
2005	Brest	7	(1)
2006–2009	Čukarički	79	(21)
2009	Daegu FC	9	(1)
2009–2011	Željezničar	48	(12)
2012	Perak	12	(1)
2012–2013	Kukësi	35	(19)
2014	Kastrioti	10	(1)
2015	Kavala		
2017–2018	Lokomotiva Beograd	25	(7)

International career
2004–2005	Serbia and Montenegro U21	7	(4)
- * Club domestic league appearances and goals as of 11 August 2012

Lazar Popović (Serbian Cyrillic: Лазар Поповић; born 10 January 1983) is a Serbian retired footballer who played as a striker.

Popović was a member of the Serbia and Montenegro youth teams.

== Club career ==
Popović started his professional career in FK Čukarički and played for the club between 2000 and 2009, he also made a small appearance in Ligue 2 with Stade Brestois 29 in the 2005–06 season.

In March 2009 he made a move to South Korea and Daegu FC. However, he was released in June 2009 from the club after failing to score goals. In August the same year Popović signed a contract with the Bosnian side FK Željezničar Sarajevo. In May 2010 he won the Premijer Liga with Željezničar and was also a runner-up in the Cup of Bosnia and Herzegovina.

In December 2011, he signed with Malaysia Super League side Perak FA. Earlier reports from Malaysian media quoted Perak management have released Popović from his contract on 1 April 2012, however later reports stated that Perak management have retained his services until 16 April, the last day for registration window for import players. On 14 April 2012 he managed to score his only goal for Perak in his final game with the team, in a 3–1 win against Sabah FA. He ended his stint with Perak with only one goal in 16 appearances in all competitions (14 league matches and 2 cup matches).

After his release from Perak, he returned to Europe to join Albanian Superliga team FK Kukësi for the 2012–13 season. At Kukësi, Popović enjoyed some renaissance to his career, becoming his club top scorer in 2012–13 with 20 goals, including 16 goals in the league to make him second top scorer in the league and helping his club to 2nd position overall that season.

Later in his career, he played for KS Kastrioti and Kavala. He initially retired in 2015, but later played for Lokomotiva Beograd.

== International career ==
Popović appeared for the Serbia and Montenegro U21 team during 2004–2005. In 2023, Dejan Savićević accused Serbian football executives that they put Popović in the U21 national team in order to help his transfer to Brest.
