= Claudinho (footballer, born November 1982) =

Brazilian footballer (born 1982)

Cláudio Wanderley Sarmento Neto (born 3 November 1982 in Maceió-AL, Brazil) known as Claudinho or Dinho is a Brazilian football (soccer) player who has recently played for South Korea's K-League 2009 side Gyeongnam FC.

Claudinho has played for Corinthians Alagoano in the Copa do Brasil.
