= Stal Sanok =

Polish football club

- Full name: Klub Sportowy Ekoball Stal Sanok
- Founded: 5 September 1946; 79 years ago (as Klub Sportowy Wagon)
- Ground: MOSiR Stadium
- Capacity: 2,000
- Chairman: Tomasz Mateja
- Manager: Paweł Jaślar
- League: IV liga Subcarpathia
- 2024–25: IV liga Subcarpathia, 5th of 18
- Website: http://www.ekoball.pl/
Home colours	Away colours

Ekoball Stal Sanok is a Polish football club based in Sanok. They currently play in the IV liga Subcarpathia, the fifth tier of the national football league system.

They reached the quarter-finals of the 2008–09 Polish Cup, and notable cup exploits include giant-killing Legia Warsaw. The club spent majority of time at third and fourth levels of Polish football pyramid, only once winning the promotion to the second division. Stal Sanok is one of the most well-known and supported clubs in the region. Their main rivals are Karpaty Krosno. The best goalscorer in history of Stal Sanok and one of the most legendary players was Jerzy Pietrzkiewicz.

There used to be an ice-hockey section, but the section became an independent club STS Sanok.

The club rebranded in 2016 due to financial problems to Ekoball Stal Sanok.
