= Léo Paulista =

Brazilian footballer

Personal information
- Full name: Leopoldo Roberto Markovsky
- Date of birth: 29 August 1983 (age 43)
- Place of birth: São Paulo, Brazil
- Height: 1.83 m (6 ft 0 in)
- Position: Striker

Youth career
- SE Palmeiras

Senior career*
Years	Team	Apps	(Gls)
2000–2002	SE Palmeiras		
2002	→ Yokohama F. Marinos (loan)		
2004–2005	→ Londrina EC (loan)		
2007	CA Juventus		
2007–2008	CRB		
2008	Bragantino		
2008–2009	Górnik Zabrze	8	(0)
2009–2010	Daegu FC	35	(9)
2011–2012	Volta Redonda	1	(0)
2012	Étoile Sportive du Sahel		
2013–2014	Pattaya United		
2014	CRB	16	(1)
2015	Pelotas		
2016	LDU Loja		(4)
2017	Comercial-AL		
2017–2018	Arapongas		
- * Club domestic league appearances and goals

Leopoldo Roberto Markovsky (born 29 August 1983), known as Léo Paulista, is a Brazilian former footballer who played as a striker.

== Club career ==
Léo Paulista's career began with SE Palmeiras - his hometown team. In 2002, he was loaned to Japanese club Yokohama F. Marinos. In 2004, he transferred to Londrina EC on loan for two seasons. Returning to SE Palmeiras, he played out the 2006 season. In the spring of 2007, he transferred to the São Paulo club CA Juventus, but within six months moved to CRB. In 2008, a further shift was made to another São Paulo club, Bragantino. In June 2008, Leo trialled for second tier Polish club Górnik Zabrze. On 3 July 2008, he signed a two-year contract with the club.

However, his move to Poland was not successful, and after only 8 league games, Léo Paulista returned to East Asia. In July 2009, he signed with Korean K-League club Daegu FC, joining them for the second half of the 2009 K-League season. Léo Paulista played an important part in improving the winning record of Daegu FC, the club having only won a single league game by the time Leo joined the team. Léo Paulista would score 4 goals in 14 appearances in the 2009 K-League, and helped put together a four-game winning streak, which although not improving their final league position, at least ensured the team finished the season more positively than it seemed mid-season.

Léo Paulista,who was unattached after end of the contract with Daegu FC, moved to Volta Redonda in February 2011.

In January 2012, Léo Paulista signed a three-and-a-half-year contract with Tunisian club Étoile Sportive du Sahel.
