= Ricardo Costa (footballer, born 1982) =

Brazilian footballer

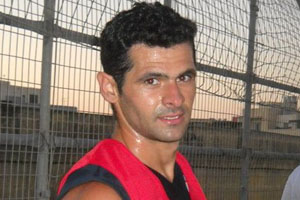
- Costa in 2010

Personal information
- Full name: Ricardo Mion Varella Costa
- Date of birth: June 17, 1982 (age 44)
- Place of birth: São Paulo, Brazil
- Height: 5 ft 11 in (1.80 m)
- Position: Striker

Senior career*
Years	Team	Apps	(Gls)
2001–2003	Corinthians		
2003	Paulista		
2003–2005	Örebro SK	77	(23)
2006	CD Leganés		
2006–2007	FC Winterthur		
2007	Grêmio Barueri		
2008	Veria		
2009	Daejeon Citizen	17	(3)
2010	ABC Futebol Clube	3	(2)
2010–2012	Tarxien Rainbows	49	(17)
2012	Deportivo Saprissa	15	(3)
2013	Pietà Hotspurs F.C.	0	(0)
- * Club domestic league appearances and goals as of October 21, 2012

Ricardo Mion Varella Costa (born June 17, 1982) is a Brazilian footballer. His last team was Deportivo Saprissa, from Costa Rica where he played as a striker. Nowadays, his son follows his steps in the youth leagues in Brazil.

== Career ==
He started his career in S.C. Corinthias Paulista. After he played in Paulista he was transferred to OSK in Sweden. After two and a half seasons, and over 50 matches for the club, he left for Spanish football, playing for C.D. Leganes. In the 2006–07 season he signed a contract with F.C. Winterthur of Swiss Challenge League. After that, he signed a one-year contract with Grêmio Barueri in July 2007, but in January of the following year he was transferred to Veria F.C., where he played in the top division of Greece. In 2009, he joined Korean team Daejeon Citizen but returned to Brazil due to personal problems. He played with ABC-RN when the club won the state league Campeonato Potiguar de Futebol in May 2010. In July 2010 he moved for Maltese pitches joining Tarxien Rainbows F.C. After two seasons, he moved to Costa Rican giants Deportivo Saprissa.

=== ÖSK ===
Joining his teammates at August 2003, Ricardo played over 50 matches with the club's shirt and scored 11 goals with 16 assists on his records during the 2003, 2004 and 2005 seasons. The technical football style of the Brazilian/Italian player was appreciated from the club's fans since his first appearances.

=== Tarxien Rainbows ===
In July 2010, it was announced that Ricardo had signed a contract with Maltese Premier League club Tarxien Rainbows where he played alongside his former Corinthians teammate Everton. On the Rainbows, he played 55 official matches, scored 22 goals with 21 assists on his records.

=== Deportivo Saprissa ===
Ricardo moved to Saprissa for the Winter Tournament (Torneo de Invierno) playing 4 matches from start and scoring 3 goals with 4 assists on his records. His first goal was against Puntarenas FC when, after being away from the team for a month due to an immigration process delay, he entered as a substitute and at the 88th minute, headed the ball home after a perfect corner by Jose Carlos Cancela and scored the winning goal. The match finished 2–1. His second goal was against Uruguay FC, with a hard raising shot at the second half scoring the 2–0. He was again the hero when he entered at the 86th minute and scored the winning goal against San Carlos at the National Stadium of Costa Rica. He scored a very nice kick-over goal (chilena) when playing the farewell match of one of Saprissa icons, Alonso Solis. It was the first of the two goals he scored that night.
