= Sebastian Nowak (footballer, born 1982) =

Polish footballer and coach

Personal information
- Full name: Sebastian Nowak
- Date of birth: 13 January 1982 (age 44)
- Place of birth: Jastrzębie-Zdrój, Poland
- Height: 1.98 m (6 ft 6 in)
- Position: Goalkeeper

Team information
- Current team: Stal Rzeszów (youth goalkeeping coach)

Senior career*
Years	Team	Apps	(Gls)
2000–2001	MOSiR Jastrzębie Zdrój		
2001–2002	Górnik Jastrzębie		
2002–2007	Ruch Chorzów	76	(0)
2008–2011	Górnik Zabrze	64	(0)
2011–2016	Termalica Bruk-Bet	155	(1)
2016–2018	GKS Katowice	27	(0)
2019–2020	Stal Rzeszów	0	(0)
- * Club domestic league appearances and goals

Sebastian Nowak (born 13 January 1982) is a Polish former professional footballer who played as a goalkeeper. He is the current goalkeeping coach of Stal Rzeszów's youth teams.

== Career ==
=== Club ===
On 1 January 2008, Nowak joined Górnik Zabrze as a Free agent. He was released from Górnik on 1 July 2011.

In July 2011, he joined LKS Nieciecza on a two-year contract.

== Coaching career ==
Nowak joined Stal Rzeszów in the beginning of January 2019. He was hired to coach the youth goalkeepers at the club, but was also in position to play for the first team if it became necessary. He joined the senior team's staff on 8 January 2024. At the conclusion of the 2023–24 season, he returned to working with the academy.

== Honours ==
Ruch Chorzów

- II liga: 2006–07
