= Ricardo da Costa (footballer) =

Brazilian footballer

Personal information
- Full name: Ricardo Valter da Costa
- Date of birth: 1 May 1981 (age 45)
- Place of birth: Goiânia, Brazil
- Height: 1.78 m (5 ft 10 in)
- Position: Midfielder

Team information
- Current team: Polet Pribislavec

Youth career
- 1997–2001: Atlético Goianiense

Senior career*
Years	Team	Apps	(Gls)
2001–2003	Atlético Goianiense	53	(1)
2003–2005	Zrinjski Mostar	28	(5)
2005	Metalurh Donetsk	0	(0)
2006–2007	NK Međimurje	20	(0)
2007–2008	Široki Brijeg	7	(0)
2009	SC Weiz	13	(1)
2009–2010	WAC St. Andrä	11	(0)
- * Club domestic league appearances and goals

Ricardo Valter da Costa (born 1 May 1981) is a Brazilian former professional footballer who played as midfielder.

== Career ==
Born in Goiânia, da Costa played for Atlético Goianiense before joined Zrinjski Mostar in summer 2003. In 2005 he trained with Hajduk Split for two months, but the transfer fell through. After that, Costa had a short spell with Metalurh Donetsk during the first half of the 2005–06 season. In January 2006, he was transferred to NK Međimurje and signed after one and a half years with Široki Brijeg. After four and a half years in Bosnia last with Široki Brijeg, he joined SC Weiz in January 2009, playing six months in the Austrian Regional League Central with the team, before signing for League rival WAC St. Andrä in July 2009.
