= Jarosław Lato =

Polish footballer

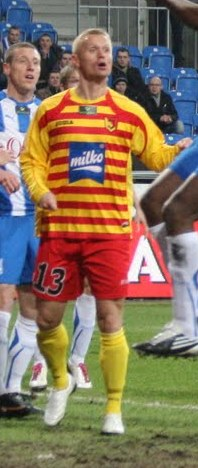

Personal information
- Date of birth: 17 June 1977 (age 49)
- Place of birth: Świdnica, Poland
- Height: 1.83 m (6 ft 0 in)
- Position: Midfielder

Youth career
- Stal Świdnica

Senior career*
Years	Team	Apps	(Gls)
1995–1997	Lechia Dzierżoniów		
1998–2002	Śląsk Wrocław	104	(10)
2002–2004	RKS Radomsko	73	(6)
2004–2005	Widzew Łódź	37	(9)
2006–2008	Dyskobolia Grodzisk	66	(10)
2008–2009	Polonia Warsaw	36	(1)
2010–2011	Jagiellonia Białystok	41	(2)
2011–2014	Polonia/Sparta Świdnica	84	(8)
2015–2016	Zryw Gola Świdnicka		
2017–2021	Wenus Nowice	84	(36)
2022–2023	LKS Bystrzyca Górna	38	(11)
2023	Grom Witków	6	(1)
- * Club domestic league appearances and goals

Jarosław Lato (born 17 June 1977) is a Polish former professional footballer who played as a winger.

== Career ==
=== Club ===
Lato has also played for Stal Świdnica, Lechia Dzierżoniów, Śląsk Wrocław, RKS Radomsko, Widzew Łódź, Dyskobolia Grodzisk, Polonia Warsaw and Jagiellonia Białystok.

He was released from Jagiellonia Białystok on 24 June 2011.

== Honours ==
Dyskobolia Grodzisk

- Polish Cup: 2006–07
- Ekstraklasa Cup: 2006–07, 2007–08

Jagiellonia Białystok

- Polish Cup: 2009–10
- Polish Super Cup: 2010

Venus Nowice

- Klasa A Wałbrzych II: 2017–18
