= Valdeir (footballer, born 1977) =

Brazilian footballer

Personal information
- Full name: Valdeir da Silva Santos
- Date of birth: 12 April 1977 (age 49)
- Place of birth: Maceió, Brazil
- Height: 1.79 m (5 ft 10 in)
- Positions: Striker; attacking midfielder

Team information
- Current team: Resende

Youth career
- 1992–1998: CRB

Senior career*
Years	Team	Apps	(Gls)
1998	Confiança		
1999	Unibol-PE		
2000–2001	São Bento-SP		
2001	Treze		
2002	Independente-SP		
2003	Londrina	19	(2)
2003–2004	Dijon	1	(0)
2004	Guarani		
2005	Vila Nova-GO		
2006	15 de Novembro		
2006	Grêmio	6	(0)
2006	Vila Nova-GO		
2006	Gama		
2007	Ipatinga		
2007	FC Oberneuland		
2007–2008	Criciúma-SC		
2008–2009	Náutico		
2009	Joinville-SC		
2009	Daegu FC	15	(2)
2010	Santa Helena		
2010	Goiânia		
2010	Bolívar	10	(0)
2011	Resende	11	(1)
2011	Metropolitano	4	(0)
2011–2015	Resende	6	(0)
- * Club domestic league appearances and goals as of 11:17, 1 November 2010 (UTC)

Valdeir da Silva Santos or simply Valdeir is an assistant football coach and former Brazilian footballer who played as a midfielder. He is currently without a club.

== Career ==
=== K-League ===
On 1 July 2009, he moved to K-League side Daegu FC.

== Honours ==
- Alagoas State League: 1995
- São Paulo State League (3rd division): 2001
