= Pavol Baláž =

Slovak footballer

Personal information
- Full name: Pavol Baláž
- Date of birth: 1 April 1984 (age 42)
- Place of birth: Partizánske, Czechoslovakia
- Height: 1.79 m (5 ft 10 in)
- Position: Left winger

Youth career
- OFK Tovarníky
- Nitra

Senior career*
Years	Team	Apps	(Gls)
- Topoľčany
2004–2007	Inter Bratislava	48	(1)
2006	→ ZTS Dubnica (loan)	13	(0)
2007–2009	Ruch Chorzów	54	(5)
2010	ŁKS Łódź	14	(2)
2010–2012	Tatran Prešov	13	(0)
2012–2016	Topoľčany		
2016–2019	SVU Mauer-Öhling		
2019–2021	Topoľčany		
2021–2022	Ludanice		
2022	Topoľčany		
- * Club domestic league appearances and goals

Pavol Baláž (born 1 April 1984) is a Slovak former professional footballer who played as a left winger.
