= Michał Zapaśnik =

Polish footballer

Personal information
- Full name: Michał Zapaśnik
- Date of birth: 19 July 1988 (age 38)
- Place of birth: Otwock, Poland
- Height: 1.80 m (5 ft 11 in)
- Position: Striker

Senior career*
Years	Team	Apps	(Gls)
2005–2006	Start Otwock		
2006–2010	Zagłębie Lubin	3	(0)
2007–2008	Zagłębie Lubin (ME)	23	(11)
2008	Zagłębie Lubin II	11	(1)
2009	→ Dolcan Ząbki (loan)	11	(2)
2010	→ Dolcan Ząbki (loan)	11	(2)
2010–2012	Dolcan Ząbki	34	(0)
2012	Start Otwock	15	(9)
2013–2015	Znicz Pruszków	33	(3)
2015	MKS Polonia Warsaw	16	(1)
2015–2017	Polonia Warsaw	47	(5)
2017	Huragan Wołomin	13	(2)
2019–2020	Start Otwock	13	(12)
- * Club domestic league appearances and goals

Michał Zapaśnik (born 19 July 1988) is a Polish former professional footballer who played as a striker.

== Career ==
In the winter 2010, he was loaned to Dolcan Ząbki again from Zagłębie Lubin. In the summer 2010, he left Zagłębie Lubin for Dolcan Ząbki.

== Honours ==
Polonia Warsaw

- III liga Łódź–Masovia: 2015–16

Start Otwock

- Klasa A Warsaw II: 2019–20
