= Jarosław Kaszowski =

Polish footballer

Personal information
- Full name: Jarosław Kaszowski
- Date of birth: 24 May 1978 (age 48)
- Place of birth: Gliwice, Poland
- Height: 1.75 m (5 ft 9 in)
- Position: Right midfielder

Senior career*
Years	Team	Apps	(Gls)
1997–2011	Piast Gliwice		
2011–2012	Ruch Radzionków	8	(0)
2012	Fortuna Gliwice		
2013	ProfiCadr Gliwice		
2014	Profi Gliwice		
- * Club domestic league appearances and goals

Jarosław Kaszowski (born 24 May 1978) is a Polish former professional footballer who played as a right midfielder.

== Career ==
=== Club ===
In July 2011, he joined Ruch Radzionków on a one-year contract.
