= Marcin Chmiest =

Polish footballer

Personal information
- Full name: Marcin Chmiest
- Date of birth: 12 February 1979 (age 47)
- Place of birth: Kraków, Poland
- Height: 1.84 m (6 ft 0 in)
- Position: Striker

Youth career
- Grębałowianka Kraków
- Krakus Nowa Huta

Senior career*
Years	Team	Apps	(Gls)
1997–1998	Wiślanka Grabie		
1998–2002	Hutnik Kraków		
2002–2005	GKS Bełchatów	67	(24)
2005	Legia Warsaw	10	(0)
2006–2007	Odra Wodzisław	25	(11)
2007	→ SC Braga (loan)	10	(0)
2007–2009	Arka Gdynia	25	(0)
2010	Odra Wodzisław	15	(1)
2011–2012	Sandecja Nowy Sącz	27	(6)
2012–2014	Skra Częstochowa	50	(27)
2014–2015	Limanovia Limanowa	23	(4)
- * Club domestic league appearances and goals

Marcin Chmiest (born 12 February 1979) is a Polish former professional footballer who played as a striker.

== Career ==
=== Club ===
In May 2005, he moved to Legia Warsaw on a one-year contract.

In 2007, he played for SC Braga, on loan from Odra Wodzisław Śląski.

In July 2007, he signed a three-year contract with Arka Gdynia.

In February 2010, he moved to Odra Wodzisław on a half-year contract.

In February 2011, he joined Sandecja Nowy Sącz on a half-year contract.
