= Patryk Klofik =

Polish footballer

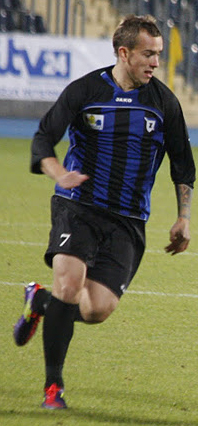
- Patryk Klofik with Zawisza Bydgoszcz

Personal information
- Full name: Patryk Klofik
- Date of birth: 15 May 1986 (age 40)
- Place of birth: Bydgoszcz, Poland
- Height: 1.71 m (5 ft 7 in)
- Position: Midfielder

Senior career*
Years	Team	Apps	(Gls)
- Polonia Piła
- MKP 1999 Piła
- Sokół Pniewy
2003	MSP Szamotuły		
2004	Sokół Pniewy		
2004	Mieszko Gniezno		
2005	Sokół Pniewy		
2005–2006	Tur Turek		
2006	Kania Gostyń		
2007	Zagłębie Lubin	3	(0)
2007–2008	Śląsk Wrocław	27	(9)
2008	Zagłębie Lubin	7	(0)
2009–2010	Śląsk Wrocław	8	(0)
2010–2012	Zawisza Bydgoszcz	35	(3)
2012–2013	Calisia Kalisz	37	(11)
2014–2016	Iskra Szydłowo		
2017	GKS Wikielec		
2017	Drwęca Nowe Miasto Lubawskie	13	(0)
2018	Warta Sieradz	10	(0)
2018	GKS Wikielec		
2018	Orkan Śmiłowo		
2019–2020	Derby Stara Łubianka		
2019–2020	BestDrive Futsal Piła (futsal)	3	(0)
2021	Leśnik Margonin		
2021–2022	KS Leżenica		
- * Club domestic league appearances and goals

Patryk Klofik (born 15 May 1986) is a Polish former professional footballer. Born in Bydgoszcz, he played as a midfielder.

== Honours ==
Zagłębie Lubin

- Ekstraklasa: 2006–07

Śląsk Wrocław

- Ekstraklasa Cup: 2008–09
