= Damian Piotrowski =

Polish footballer

Personal information
- Full name: Damian Piotrowski
- Date of birth: 9 January 1987 (age 39)
- Place of birth: Głogów, Poland
- Height: 1.72 m (5 ft 8 in)
- Position: Midfielder

Team information
- Current team: Sparta Przedmoście
- Number: 2

Senior career*
| Years | Team | Apps | (Gls) |
| 2002–2003 | UKS SP Głogów | | |
| 2003–2004 | Zagłębie Lubin II | | |
| 2005 | Zagłębie Lubin | 0 | (0) |
| 2005–2006 | Zagłębie Lubin II | | |
| 2006–2007 | Chrobry Głogów | | |
| 2007–2009 | Zagłębie Lubin | 17 | (1) |
| 2010–2012 | KS Polkowice | 59 | (7) |
| 2012–2014 | Termalica Bruk-Bet | 36 | (1) |
| 2014–2015 | Chrobry Głogów | 28 | (9) |
| 2015–2018 | Wisła Płock | 39 | (9) |
| 2018–2019 | Chojniczanka Chojnice | 29 | (7) |
| 2019–2021 | Chrobry Głogów | 35 | (1) |
| 2021–2022 | Radunia Stężyca | 7 | (1) |
| 2023 | Odra Bytom Odrzański | 14 | (4) |
| 2023–2024 | Sparta Grębocice | 28 | (13) |
| 2024– | Sparta Przedmoście | 19 | (13) |
- * Club domestic league appearances and goals as of 10:50, 21 June 2025 (UTC)

Damian Piotrowski (born 9 January 1987) is a Polish professional footballer who plays as a midfielder for Klasa A club Sparta Przedmoście.

== Career ==
On 14 October 2019, Piotrowski joined Chrobry Głogów on a free transfer, signing a contract for the rest of the season.

== Honours ==
Odra Bytom Odrzański

- IV liga Lubusz: 2022–23

Sparta Grębocice

- Regional league Legnica: 2023–24
