= Everton (footballer, born 1979) =

Brazilian footballer

Everton Antônio Pereira
Personal information
- Full name: Everton Antônio Pereira
- Date of birth: 15 November 1979 (age 46)
- Place of birth: São José do Rio Preto, Brazil
- Height: 1.84 m (6 ft 0 in)
- Position: Midfielder

Senior career*
Years	Team	Apps	(Gls)
1995–1999	América-SP		
1999–2000	Atlético Paranaense		
2001–2002	Torreense		
2002–2003	Corinthians		
2003	Taubaté		
2004–2005	Tavriya Simferopol	19	(0)
2005	Taquaritinga		
2005	Adap Galo Maringá		
2006–2007	Vilnius	39	(1)
2007–2008	Jagiellonia Białystok	10	(1)
2008	ŁKS Łódź	0	(0)
2008	Jagiellonia Białystok	5	(1)
2009–2012	Tarxien Rainbows	80	(3)
- * Club domestic league appearances and goals

Everton Antônio Pereira (born 15 November 1979 in São José do Rio Preto), commonly known as Everton, is a Brazilian former professional footballer who played as a midfielder.

He represented América-SP from 1995 to 1999.
