= Marcin Sobczak =

Polish footballer

Personal information
- Date of birth: 20 June 1987 (age 39)
- Place of birth: Jastrzębie-Zdrój, Poland
- Height: 1.87 m (6 ft 2 in)
- Position: Forward

Youth career
- MOSiR Żory

Senior career*
Years	Team	Apps	(Gls)
2005–2007	Gwarek Zabrze		
2006–2007	Lech Poznań	0	(0)
2008–2010	Ruch Chorzów	11	(3)
2009	→ GKS Bełchatów (loan)	4	(0)
2009–2010	→ Zawisza Bydgoszcz (loan)	23	(8)
2010	→ Zakynthos (loan)		
2011–2012	→ GKS Tychy (loan)	17	(5)
2012	Viktoria 1889 Berlin	6	(2)
2013–2017	Pniówek Pawłowice	88	(30)
2017	Iskra Pszczyna		(6)
2018–2019	Pniówek Pawłowice	11	(1)
2019	Spójnia Landek	12	(4)
2019–2020	Wisła Strumień	5	(0)
2020–2023	Zameczek Czernica	79	(61)
2024	LKS Baranowice	20	(10)
- * Club domestic league appearances and goals as of 20:55, 24 June 2025 (UTC)

Marcin Sobczak (born 20 June 1987) is a Polish footballer who plays as a forward.
