= Jakub Kaszuba (footballer) =

Polish footballer

Personal information
- Date of birth: 28 January 1988 (age 38)
- Place of birth: Gdynia, Poland
- Height: 1.87 m (6 ft 2 in)
- Position: Forward

Youth career
- Bałtyk Gdynia

Senior career*
| Years | Team | Apps | (Gls) |
| 2005–2007 | Bałtyk Gdynia | 47 | (28) |
| 2007–2010 | Cracovia | 22 | (2) |
| 2010–2011 | Bałtyk Gdynia | 21 | (2) |
| 2011–2012 | Kaszubia Kościerzyna | 20 | (3) |
| 2013 | Gryf Wejherowo | 13 | (2) |
| 2018 | AP Sopot | 2 | (3) |
| Total | | 125 | (40) |
- * Club domestic league appearances and goals

Jakub Kaszuba (born 28 January 1988) is a Polish former professional footballer who played as a forward.

== Early life ==
Born in 1988, Kaszuba grew up idolizing Sweden international Zlatan Ibrahimović. As a youth player, Kaszuba joined the youth academy of Bałtyk Gdynia. He was nicknamed "Kasza" and was regarded as one of the brightest youth prospects in Poland.

== Career ==
Kaszuba started his career with Bałtyk Gdynia. In total, he scored 28 league goals for them during his first stint there. After that, he signed for Cracovia. He played for the first team while simultaneously playing for their youth team. Kaszubed finished as top scorer of the 2009–10 Młoda Ekstraklasa with 13 goals. He also featured in friendlies for the first team.

He scored his first league goal for Cracovia during a 1–1 draw with Polonia Warsaw on 17 October 2008, dedicating the goal to his parents.

In early 2009, he suffered an injury that kept him sidelined for several months. He returned to play in May 2009 after receiving treatment. He scored his second Ekstraklasa goal for Cracovia in a 2–6 draw to Lechia Gdańsk on 7 August 2009, the only goal he scored for the first team during the 2009–10 season.

In total, he made 22 league appearances for the club and scored two goals.

In the summer 2010, he returned to Bałtyk Gdynia. He made 21 league appearances and scored two goals during his second stint there. After that, he signed for Kaszubia Kościerzyna. He scored three goals in 20 III liga appearances for Kaszubia. In 2013, Kaszuba moved to Gryf Wejherowo. He made 13 II liga appearances and scored 2 goals there. After that, he stopped playing professional football for a year.

== Style of play ==
Kaszuba was known for his height and physicality as a striker.

== Honours ==
Individual

- Młoda Ekstraklasa top scorer: 2009–10
