= Wojciech Grzyb (footballer) =

Polish footballer

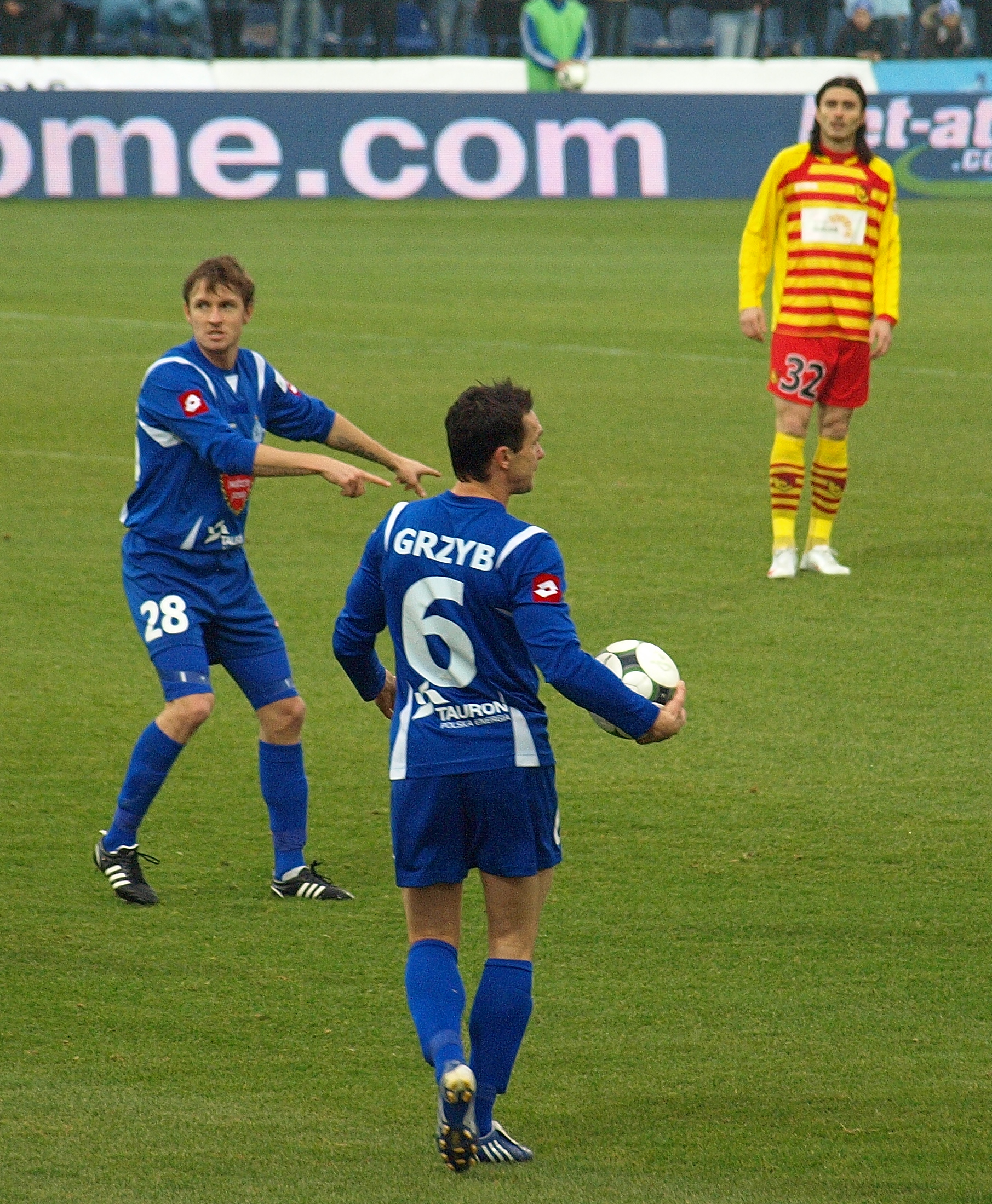

Personal information
- Date of birth: 21 December 1974 (age 51)
- Place of birth: Mysłowice, Poland
- Height: 1.75 m (5 ft 9 in)
- Positions: Defender; midfielder

Team information
- Current team: Ruch Chorzów (academy director); Ruch Chorzów II & Poland U18 (fitness coach)

Senior career*
Years	Team	Apps	(Gls)
1993–1994	Ruch Chorzów	0	(0)
1994–1995	Górnik 09 Mysłowice		
1995–1998	Victoria Jaworzno		
1998–2002	Ruch Radzionków	72	(7)
2002–2005	Odra Wodzisław	88	(4)
2006–2012	Ruch Chorzów	192	(25)
2014	Concordia Elbląg II	2	(0)
2019–2020	Stal Chocianów	3	(0)

Managerial career
- 2013: Górnik Wesoła
- 2013: Concordia Elbląg II
- 2013: Concordia Elbląg
- 2014: Concordia Elbląg (caretaker)
- 2019: Orkan Szczedrzykowice
- 2019–2020: Stal Chocianów (player-manager)
- 2024: Ruch Chorzów II
- * Club domestic league appearances and goals

Wojciech Grzyb (born 21 December 1974) is a Polish professional football manager and former player. He is currently the director of Ruch Chorzów's academy, and the fitness coach for Ruch's reserve team and the Poland national under-18 team.

In the past, he played for clubs such as Górnik 09 Mysłowice, Victoria Jaworzno, Ruch Radzionków, Odra Wodzisław and Ruch Chorzów.

After retiring, he received a commemorative jersey with the number “300” from Ruch's management. It was the number of games played in the Ekstraklasa that Grzyb surpassed during the 2011–12 season, and he played a total of 302 games at the highest level of Polish football.

In the 1990s he also played futsal, and won the Polish vice-championship. He made two appearances for Poland national futsal team in matches against Hungary.

He returned to Ruch on 24 April 2017 as an assistant under Krzysztof Warzycha, and left the club a month-and-a-half later. In 2021, he joined Ruch's coaching staff as an assistant and fitness coach for the senior team. In June 2024, he was appointed co-head coach of their reserve team, as well as head of the club's academy. In late August 2024, following the appointment of Dawid Szulczek as the club's manager, Grzyb left his previous roles and re-joined Ruch's technical staff as a fitness coach, before returning to the academy two months later.

== Honours ==
Ruch Chorzów

- II liga: 2006–07
