= Dariusz Pawlusiński =

Polish footballer (born 1977)

Personal information
- Full name: Dariusz Pawlusiński
- Date of birth: 24 November 1977 (age 48)
- Place of birth: Będzin, Poland
- Height: 1.75 m (5 ft 9 in)
- Position: Midfielder

Team information
- Current team: Inter Krostoszowice; LKS Krzyżanowice (manager)

Senior career*
Years	Team	Apps	(Gls)
1997–1998	Rymer Niedobczyce		
1998–2001	Włókniarz Kietrz		
2001	→ Dyskobolia Grodzisk (loan)	2	(0)
2002–2005	GKS Bełchatów	98	(19)
2005–2010	Cracovia	142	(26)
2011–2014	Termalica Bruk-Bet	95	(27)
2014–2016	Raków Częstochowa	51	(12)
2016–2021	Unia Turza Śląska	141	(34)
2021–2025	LKS Krzyżanowice	23	(2)
2025–	Inter Krostoszowice	6	(3)

Managerial career
- 2021–: LKS Krzyżanowice
- * Club domestic league appearances and goals as of 22:25, 24 June 2025 (UTC)

Dariusz Pawlusiński (born 24 November 1977) is a Polish professional footballer who plays as a midfielder for Klasa A club Inter Krostoszowice. He also manages club LKS Krzyżanowice.

== Managerial statistics ==
As of match played 14 June 2025

Managerial record by team and tenure
Team	From	To	Record							
Team	From	To	G	W	D	L	GF	GA	GD	Win %
LKS Krzyżanowice	5 July 2021	Present	131	64	32	35	322	224	+98	48.85
Total			131	64	32	35	322	224	+98	48.85

== Honours ==
Unia Turza Śląska

- Regional league Silesia III: 2019–20
- Polish Cup (Racibórz regionals): 2019–20
