= Marcin Wodecki =

Polish footballer (born 1988)

Personal information
- Full name: Marcin Wodecki
- Date of birth: 14 January 1988 (age 38)
- Place of birth: Rybnik, Poland
- Height: 1.75 m (5 ft 9 in)
- Position: Winger

Team information
- Current team: Szombierki Bytom

Youth career
- RKP Rybnik

Senior career*
Years	Team	Apps	(Gls)
2005–2007	ROW Rybnik		
2007–2015	Górnik Zabrze	64	(6)
2009	→ Odra Wodzisław (loan)	26	(4)
2013	→ Podbeskidzie (loan)	26	(3)
2014–2015	→ GKS Tychy (loan)	16	(2)
2015–2016	GKS Tychy	56	(5)
2016–2017	Legionovia Legionowo	18	(7)
2017–2019	Odra Opole	46	(18)
2019	→ Siarka Tarnobrzeg (loan)	14	(2)
2019–2021	ROW 1964 Rybnik	34	(10)
2021–2022	Odra Wodzisław	32	(23)
2022–2026	Górnik Zabrze II	135	(34)
2026–	Szombierki Bytom	0	(0)

International career
2008–2009	Poland U21	6	(1)
- * Club domestic league appearances and goals as of 10:25, 5 July 2026 (UTC)

Marcin Wodecki (born 14 January 1988) is a Polish professional footballer who plays as a winger for IV liga Silesia club Szombierki Bytom.

== Career ==
In the past, Wodecki played for RKP Rybnik, ROW Rybnik and Odra Wodzisław Śląski on loan.

== Honours ==
ROW Rybnik

- Polish Cup (Rybnik regionals): 2019–20

Odra Wodzisław

- IV liga Silesia II: 2020–21

Górnik Zabrze II

- Polish Cup (Silesia regionals): 2025–26
- Polish Cup (Zabrze regionals): 2022–23, 2023–24, 2024–25, 2025–26

Individual

- Młoda Ekstraklasa top scorer: 2007–08
