= Świt Nowy Dwór Mazowiecki =

Association football club in Poland

MKS Świt Nowy Dwór Mazowiecki
- Full name: Miejski Klub Sportowy; Świt Nowy Dwór Mazowiecki
- Founded: 1935; 91 years ago
- Ground: Municipal Stadium
- Capacity: 3,200
- Chairman: Katarzyna Sazonowicz
- Manager: Adrian Langier
- League: III liga, group I
- 2025–26: III liga, group I, 11th of 18
- Website: www.mksswit.pl
Home colours	Away colours

Świt Nowy Dwór Mazowiecki (Polish pronunciation: [ˈɕfit ˈnɔvɨ ˈdvur mazɔˈvjɛt͡skʲi]) is a Polish football club based in Nowy Dwór Mazowiecki, Masovian Voivodeship, currently competing in group I of the III liga, the fourth tier of Polish football.

== History ==
This team competed in Ekstraklasa in the 2003–04 season under the name "Lukullus Świt Nowy Dwór Mazowiecki" [luˈkullus] for first time, but it was relegated after one season as 13th team with 22 points, preceded by 14th Widzew Łódź and succeeded by 12th Górnik Polkowice, which was also relegated with one point more after only season in Ekstraklasa.

== Stadium ==
Świt plays their home matches at the Municipal Stadium, at the 66 Sportowa Street in Nowy Dwór Mazowiecki. The city is the owner of the stadium and it is managed by the local Sports and Recreation Center. At the turn of 2008 and 2009, an illuminated, full-size training field with artificial turf was put into use.

== Current squad ==
As of 14 March 2023

Note: Flags indicate national team as defined under FIFA eligibility rules; some limited exceptions apply. Players may hold more than one non-FIFA nationality.

No. / Pos. / Nation / Player; 10 / MF / UKR / Yaroslav Yampol	No. / Pos. / Nation / Player; — / FW / UKR / Yevhen Radionov

=== Out on loan ===
Note: Flags indicate national team as defined under FIFA eligibility rules; some limited exceptions apply. Players may hold more than one non-FIFA nationality.

No.	Pos.	Nation	Player
