= 2009–10 Polish Cup =

Football tournament season

Tournament details
- Country: Poland
- Teams: 83

Final positions
- Champions: Jagiellonia Białystok
- Runners-up: Pogoń Szczecin

Tournament statistics
- Matches played: 84
- Goals scored: 256 (3.05 per match)
- Top goal scorer(s): Tomasz Kempiński; Piotr Dziuba; Tomasz Frankowski (4 goals each)

The 2009–10 Polish Cup was the fifty-sixth season of the annual Polish cup competition. It began on July 29, 2009 with the extra preliminary round and ended on May 21, 2010 with the final, played at neutral venue. The winners qualified for the third qualifying round of the UEFA Europa League. Lech Poznań were the defending champions.

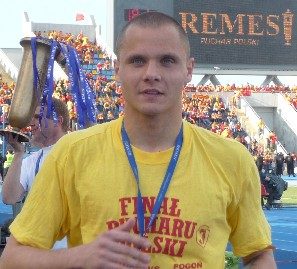
Rafał Gikiewicz in 2010 with Jagiellonia Białystok after winning the Polish Cup.

== Extra preliminary round ==
The matches were played on 29 July 2009.

Team 1	Score	Team 2
29 July 2009
Gryf Kamień Pomorski	0–2	Nielba Wągrowiec
Olimpia Elbląg	1–2 (a.e.t.)	Pogoń Szczecin
Olimpia Grudziądz	2–1	Elana Toruń
Piast Kobylin	3–1	Czarni Żagań
Warmia Grajewo	1–0	Zawisza Bydgoszcz
Bytovia Bytów	2–1	OKS 1945 Olsztyn
Pogoń Świebodzin	1–2	Kotwica Kołobrzeg
Motobi Kąty Wrocławskie	0–2	MKS Kluczbork
Wisła Puławy	2–0	Wigry Suwałki
Mazur Karczew	3–0	ŁKS Łomża
Ruch Zdzieszowice	1–0 (a.e.t.)	Unia Janikowo
Omega Kleszczów	2–1	Jarota Jarocin
Korona II Kielce	3–0	Ślęza Wrocław
Ruch Radzionków	1–0	KSZO Ostrowiec Świętokrzyski
Resovia Rzeszów	3–1	Raków Częstochowa
Unia Tarnów	0–2	GKS Tychy
Lechia Zielona Góra	3–1	Victoria Koronowo
Polonia Słubice	5–0	Chemik Police
Miedź Legnica	0–1	Zagłębie Sosnowiec
Jeziorak Iława	2–1	Freskovita Wysokie Mazowieckie
Stal Poniatowa	3–4 (a.e.t.)	Start Otwock
Concordia Piotrków Trybunalski	2–4	Sandecja Nowy Sącz
Hetman Zamość	5–1	Sokół Aleksandrów Łódzki
Przebój Wolbrom	4–2	Górnik Wieliczka
Nida Pińczów	1–1 (a.e.t.) (3–5 p)	Kolejarz Stróże
Okocimski KS Brzesko	1–0	Pelikan Łowicz

== Preliminary round ==
Nielba Wągrowiec and Hetman Zamość were automatically drawn to the first round.

The matches were played on 11 August 2009.

Team 1	Score	Team 2
11 August 2009
Olimpia Grudziądz	1–0	Jeziorak Iława
Kotwica Kołobrzeg	5–7 (a.e.t.)	Pogoń Szczecin
12 August 2009
GKS Tychy	1–1 (a.e.t.) (4–3 p)	Sandecja Nowy Sącz
Piast Kobylin	1–1 (a.e.t.) (5–4 p)	Lechia Zielona Góra
Zagłębie Sosnowiec	4–1	Przebój Wolbrom
Resovia Rzeszów	0–2	Okocimski KS Brzesko
Ruch Zdzieszowice	2–1	Omega Kleszczów
Bytovia Bytów	5–3 (a.e.t.)	Wisła Puławy
Ruch Radzionków	5–0	Kolejarz Stróże
Korona II Kielce	0–2	MKS Kluczbork
Warmia Grajewo	1–2	Polonia Słubice
Mazur Karczew	0–1	Start Otwock

== Round 1 ==
The twelve winners of the preliminary round, along with Nielba Wągrowiec and Hetman Zamość and the eighteen teams from 2008–09 I Liga competed in this round. Okocimski KS Brzesko was drawn automatically to the second round.

The matches were played on 25 and 26 August 2009.

Team 1	Score	Team 2
25 August 2009
Ruch Zdzieszowice	0–3	Dolcan Ząbki
Nielba Wągrowiec	3–1	Znicz Pruszków
Pogoń Szczecin	2–0	Motor Lublin
MKS Kluczbork	0–0 (a.e.t.) (2–3 p)	GKP Gorzów Wielkopolski
Polonia Słubice	3–1	GKS Katowice
Bytovia Bytów	1–0	Tur Turek
Zagłębie Sosnowiec	2–0	Flota Świnoujście
Ruch Radzionków	0–1	Korona Kielce
26 August 2009
GKS Tychy	1–1 (a.e.t.) (3–2 p)	Górnik Łęczna
Hetman Zamość	1–1 (a.e.t.) (5–4 p)	Warta Poznań
Olimpia Grudziądz	3–0	Kmita Zabierzów
Start Otwock	2–1	Podbeskidzie Bielsko-Biała
Stal Stalowa Wola	2–1	Wisła Płock
GKS Jastrzębie Zdrój	3–4	Widzew Łódź
Piast Kobylin	3–1	Zagłębie Lubin

== Round 2 ==
The fifteen winners of Round 1, along with Okocimski KS Brzesko and the sixteen teams from 2008–09 Ekstraklasa, competed in this round.

The matches were played on 23 & 29 September and 7 October 2009.

Team 1	Score	Team 2
23 September 2009
Start Otwock	3–2	ŁKS Łódź
Okocimski KS Brzesko	1–2	Arka Gdynia
Piast Kobylin	1–1 (a.e.t.) (2–4 p)	Cracovia
Hetman Zamość	0–3	Wisła Kraków
Olimpia Grudziądz	1–2	Odra Wodzisław Śląski
Polonia Słubice	1–2	Piast Gliwice
GKS Tychy	0–1 (a.e.t.)	Jagiellonia Białystok
Dolcan Ząbki	1–1 (a.e.t.) (5–4 p)	Śląsk Wrocław
Bytovia Bytów	2–1	Polonia Bytom
Widzew Łódź	0–1	Ruch Chorzów
Zagłębie Sosnowiec	2–0	Górnik Zabrze
Korona Kielce	3–1	GKS Bełchatów
29 September 2009
GKP Gorzów Wielkopolski	0–2	Legia Warsaw
Nielba Wągrowiec	1–3	Lechia Gdańsk
Stal Stalowa Wola	0–0 (a.e.t.) (4–1 p)	Lech Poznań
7 October 2009
Pogoń Szczecin	2–0	Polonia Warsaw

23 September 2009	Start Otwock	3–2	ŁKS Łódź	Otwock
15:30 CEST (UTC+02:00)	Radžius 42' (o.g.); Warszawski 45'; Sobótka 81'		Świątek 50'; Kujawa 90+1'	Stadium: Stadion im. Tadeusza Ślusarskiego; Attendance: 1,600; Referee: Mirosław Górecki (Katowice)

23 September 2009	Okocimski KS Brzesko	1–2	Arka Gdynia	Brzesko
15:45 CEST (UTC+02:00)	Ogar 57'		Sakaliev 39'; Mrowiec 63'	Stadium: Stadion Okocimski; Attendance: 1,500; Referee: Sebastian Jarzębak (Bytom)

23 September 2009	Piast Kobylin	1–1 (a.e.t.) (2–4 p)	Cracovia	Kobylin
16:00 CEST (UTC+02:00)	Kempiński 34' (pen.)		Klich 71'	Stadium: Stadion Kobylin; Attendance: 2,800; Referee: Radosław Trochimiuk (Przasnysz)
	Penalties
	Reyer (penalty scored); Kendzia (penalty scored); Kempiński (penalty missed); Nowicki (penalty missed)		(penalty scored) Matusiak; (penalty scored) Wasiluk; (penalty scored) Klich; (penalty scored) Derbich

23 September 2009	Hetman Zamość	0–3	Wisła Kraków	Zamość
16:00 CEST (UTC+02:00)			Ćwielong 39'; Małecki 75', 83'	Stadium: Stadion OSIR; Attendance: 6,200; Referee: Adam Kajzer (Rzeszów)

23 September 2009	Olimpia Grudziądz	1–2	Odra Wodzisław	Grudziądz
16:00 CEST (UTC+02:00)	Koczur 6'		Chwalibogowski 4'; Piechniak 61'	Stadium: Stadion Miejski Grudziądz; Attendance: 2,900; Referee: Paweł Dreschel (Gdańsk)

23 September 2009	Polonia Słubice	1–2	Piast Gliwice	Słubice
16:00 CEST (UTC+02:00)	Sylla 86'		Łudziński 35'; Maciejak 64'	Stadium: Stadion Olimpijski; Attendance: 1,100; Referee: Tomasz Garbowski (Kluczbork)

23 September 2009	GKS Tychy	0–1 (a.e.t.)	Jagiellonia Białystok	Tychy
16:00 CEST (UTC+02:00)			Grosicki 120'	Stadium: Stadion Miejski Tychy; Attendance: 2,000; Referee: Jacek Walczyński (Lublin)

23 September 2009	Dolcan Ząbki	1–1 (a.e.t.) (5–4 p)	Śląsk Wrocław	Ząbki
16:00 CEST (UTC+02:00)	Stańczyk 5'		Dudek 69'	Stadium: Stadion Dolcanu; Attendance: 800; Referee: Włodzimierz Bartos (Łódź)
	Penalties
	Ziajka (penalty scored); Stańczyk (penalty scored); Kosiorowski (penalty scored); Korkuć (penalty scored); Tataj (penalty scored)		(penalty scored) Dudek; (penalty scored) Mila; (penalty scored) Biliński; (penalty scored) Ulatowski; (penalty missed) Fojut

23 September 2009	Bytovia Bytów	2–1	Polonia Bytom	Bytów
16:15 CEST (UTC+02:00)	Łapigrowski 14'; Pufelski 60'		Kulpaka 71'	Stadium: Stadion MKS; Attendance: 1,900; Referee: Marek Karkut (Warsaw)

23 September 2009	Widzew Łódź	0–1	Ruch Chorzów	Łódź
18:00 CEST (UTC+02:00)			Janoszka 81'	Stadium: Stadion Widzewa; Attendance: 7,200; Referee: Daniel Stefański (Bydgoszcz)

23 September 2009	Zagłębie Sosnowiec	2–0	Górnik Zabrze	Sosnowiec
20:15 CEST (UTC+02:00)	Marek 31'; Filipowicz 48'			Stadium: Stadion Ludowy; Attendance: 7,000; Referee: Piotr Siedlecki (Warsaw)

23 September 2009	Korona Kielce	3–1	GKS Bełchatów	Kielce
20:15 CEST (UTC+02:00)	Edson 17'; Kiełb 33'; Konon 81'		Ujek 54'	Stadium: Arena Kielc; Attendance: 5,100; Referee: Szymon Marciniak (Płock)

29 September 2009	GKP Gorzów Wielkopolski	0–2	Legia Warsaw	Gorzów Wielkopolski
15:00 CEST (UTC+02:00)			Szałachowski 17'; Mięciel 90+3'	Stadium: Stadion OSiR GKP; Attendance: 5,500; Referee: Dawid Piasecki (Słupsk)

29 September 2009	Nielba Wągrowiec	1–3	Lechia Gdańsk	Wągrowiec
15:30 CEST (UTC+02:00)	Leśniewski 29'		Buzała 19', 48'; Nowak 24'	Stadium: Stadion Miejski Wągrowiec; Attendance: 420; Referee: Michał Mularczyk (Skierniewice)

29 September 2009	Stal Stalowa Wola	0–0 (a.e.t.) (4–1 p)	Lech Poznań	Stalowa Wola
15:30 CEST (UTC+02:00)				Stadium: Stadion MOSiR; Attendance: 4,900; Referee: Mariusz Trofimiec (Kielce)
	Penalties
	Mihalevskyy (penalty scored); Wasilewski (penalty scored); Maciorowski (penalty scored); Czpak (penalty scored)		Đurđević (penalty missed); Bosacki (penalty scored); Injac (penalty missed)

7 October 2009	Pogoń Szczecin	2–0	Polonia Warsaw	Szczecin
18:00 CEST (UTC+02:00)	Wólkiewicz 61'; Hrymowicz 68'			Stadium: Stadion Florian Kryger; Attendance: 5,100; Referee: Wojciech Krztoń (Olsztyn)

== Round 3 ==
The sixteen winners of Round 2 competed in this round.

The matches were played on 27, 28 October 2009 and on 3, 11, 25 November 2009.

Team 1	Score	Team 2
27 October 2009
Bytovia Bytów	0–2	Wisła Kraków
Dolcan Ząbki	3–4 (a.e.t.)	Korona Kielce
Zagłębie Sosnowiec	3–0	Stal Stalowa Wola
Pogoń Szczecin	2–0	Piast Gliwice
28 October 2009
Start Otwock	0–1	Ruch Chorzów
3 November 2009
Arka Gdynia	0–2 (a.e.t.)	Jagiellonia Białystok
11 November 2009
Lechia Gdańsk	1–0	Odra Wodzisław
25 November 2009
Legia Warsaw	2–0 (a.e.t.)	Cracovia

27 October 2009	Bytovia Bytów	0–2	Wisła Kraków	Bytów
13:00 CET (UTC+01:00)			Ćwielong 16'; Łobodziński 61'	Stadium: Stadion MKS; Attendance: 5,000; Referee: Mariusz Trofimiec (Kielce)

27 October 2009	Dolcan Ząbki	3–4 (a.e.t.)	Korona Kielce	Ząbki
13:00 CET (UTC+01:00)	Stańczyk 10'; Ziajka 40'; Tataj 74'		Buśkiewicz 31'; Wilk 65'; Kiełb 69'; Łatka 111'	Stadium: Stadion Dolcanu; Attendance: 1,600; Referee: Sebastian Jarzębak (Bytom)

27 October 2009	Zagłębie Sosnowiec	3–0	Stal Stalowa Wola	Sosnowiec
18:00 CET (UTC+01:00)	Jaromin 37', 59'; Koźmiński 77'			Stadium: Stadion Ludowy; Attendance: 3,100; Referee: Jacek Walczyński (Lublin)

27 October 2009	Pogoń Szczecin	2–0	Piast Gliwice	Szczecin
20:15 CET (UTC+01:00)	Petasz 41', 79'			Stadium: Stadion Florian Kryger; Attendance: 4,900; Referee: Jarosław Chmiel (Warsaw)

28 October 2009	Start Otwock	0–1	Ruch Chorzów	Otwock
13:00 CET (UTC+01:00)			Nowacki 44'	Stadium: Stadion im. Tadeusza Ślusarskiego; Attendance: 2,400; Referee: Tomasz Musiał (Kraków)

3 November 2009	Arka Gdynia	0–2 (a.e.t.)	Jagiellonia Białystok	Gdynia
20:15 CET (UTC+01:00)			Frankowski 94', 113'	Stadium: Stadion GOSiR; Attendance: 2,300; Referee: Szymon Marciniak (Płock)

11 November 2009	Lechia Gdańsk	1–0	Odra Wodzisław Śląski	Gdańsk
15:00 CET (UTC+01:00)	Buzała 36'			Stadium: Stadion Lechii; Attendance: 4,500; Referee: Artur Radziszewski (Warsaw)

25 November 2009	Legia Warsaw	2–0 (a.e.t.)	Cracovia	Warsaw
20:15 CET (UTC+01:00)	Szałachowski 101'; Rybus 117'			Stadium: Stadion Wojska Polskiego; Attendance: 1,400; Referee: Dawid Piasecki (Słupsk)

== Quarter-finals ==
The eight winners of Round 3 competed in this round.

The Quarterfinals were played in two legs. The first legs were played on 16 & 17 March 2010, while the second legs took place one week later on 23 & 24 March 2010.

Team 1	Agg.	Team 2	1st leg	2nd leg
Ruch Chorzów	2–2 (a)	Legia Warsaw	1–0	1–2 (a.e.t.)
Zagłębie Sosnowiec	1–4	Pogoń Szczecin	0–3	1–1
Lechia Gdańsk	3–1	Wisła Kraków	0–0	3–1
Korona Kielce	3–4	Jagiellonia Białystok	3–1	0–3

=== First leg ===
16 March 2010	Ruch Chorzów	1–0	Legia Warsaw	Chorzów
18:00 CET (UTC+01:00)	Sobiech 74'			Stadium: Stadion Ruchu; Attendance: 4,100; Referee: Daniel Stefański (Bydgoszcz)

16 March 2010	Zagłębie Sosnowiec	0–3	Pogoń Szczecin	Sosnowiec
18:45 CET (UTC+01:00)			Lebedyński 67', 84'; Zawadzki 90+1'	Stadium: Stadion Ludowy; Attendance: 5,500; Referee: Adam Lyczmański (Bydgoszcz)

17 March 2010	Lechia Gdańsk	0–0	Wisła Kraków	Gdańsk
17:15 CET (UTC+01:00)				Stadium: Stadion Lechii; Attendance: 3,100; Referee: Szymon Marciniak (Płock)

17 March 2010	Korona Kielce	3–1	Jagiellonia Białystok	Kielce
18:00 CET (UTC+01:00)	Mijailović 28'; Zieliński 32'; Tataj 40'		Frankowski 21'	Stadium: Arena Kielc; Attendance: 3,900; Referee: Włodzimierz Bartos (Łódź)

=== Second leg ===
23 March 2010	Legia Warsaw	2–1 (a.e.t.) (2–2 (a) agg.)	Ruch Chorzów	Warsaw
14:00 CET (UTC+01:00)	Grzelak 66'; Jarzębowski 120+1'		Janoszka 107'	Stadium: Stadion Wojska Polskiego; Attendance: 1,800; Referee: Paweł Gil (Lublin)

23 March 2010	Wisła Kraków	1–3 (1–3 agg.)	Lechia Gdańsk	Kraków
20:00 CET (UTC+01:00)	Małecki 23' (pen.)		Surma 1'; Brożek 10' (o.g.); Lukjanovs 37'	Stadium: Stadion Suche Stawy; Attendance: 3,600; Referee: Marcin Borski (Warsaw)

24 March 2010	Jagiellonia Białystok	3–0 (4–3 agg.)	Korona Kielce	Białystok
18:00 CET (UTC+01:00)	Klepczarek 16'; Jezierski 56'; Hermes 69' (pen.)			Stadium: Stadion Miejski; Attendance: 4,500; Referee: Marcin Szulc (Warsaw)

24 March 2010	Pogoń Szczecin	1–1 (4–1 agg.)	Zagłębie Sosnowiec	Szczecin
20:00 CET (UTC+01:00)	Dziuba 17'		Pajączkowski 67'	Stadium: Stadion Florian Kryger; Attendance: 7,100; Referee: Artur Radziszewski (Warsaw)

== Semi-finals ==
The four teams that advanced from the Quarterfinals, competed in this round. The two winners advanced to the last round, the finals.

The first leg of the Semi-finals were played on April 6, while the second legs took place on May 4, 2010.

Team 1	Agg.	Team 2	1st leg	2nd leg
Lechia Gdańsk	2–3	Jagiellonia Białystok	1–2	1–1
Ruch Chorzów	1–1 (a)	Pogoń Szczecin	1–1	0–0

=== First leg ===
6 April 2010	Ruch Chorzów	1–1	Pogoń Szczecin	Chorzów
20:00 CEST (UTC+02:00)	Sobiech 49'		Mysiak 83'	Stadium: Stadion Ruchu; Attendance: 6,100; Referee: Piotr Siedlecki (Warsaw)

6 April 2010	Lechia Gdańsk	1–2	Jagiellonia Białystok	Gdańsk
20:15 CEST (UTC+02:00)	Wołąkiewicz 90+3' (pen.)		Grzyb 7'; Bruno 29'	Stadium: Stadion Lechii; Attendance: 7,000; Referee: Marek Karkut (Warsaw)

=== Second leg ===
4 May 2010	Pogoń Szczecin	0–0 (1 (a)–1 agg.)	Ruch Chorzów	Szczecin
17:45 CEST (UTC+02:00)				Stadium: Stadion Florian Kryger; Attendance: 10,200; Referee: Dawid Piasecki (Słupsk)

4 May 2010	Jagiellonia Białystok	1–1 (3–2 agg.)	Lechia Gdańsk	Białystok
20:15 CEST (UTC+02:00)	Frankowski 74'		Bajić 88'	Stadium: Stadion Miejski; Attendance: 6,100; Referee: Tomasz Mikulski (Lublin)

== Final ==
22 May 2010
15:30 CEST (UTC+02:00)

Pogoń Szczecin	0–1	Jagiellonia Białystok
		Skerla 49'

Zdzisław Krzyszkowiak Stadium, Bydgoszcz
Attendance: 13,300
Referee: Robert Małek (Zabrze)

Pogoń Szczecin	Jagiellonia Białystok

GK	84	(Poland) Radosław Janukiewicz
DF	4	(Poland) Marcin Nowak	(substituted off) 60'
DF	23	(Poland) Krzysztof Hrymowicz		Booked
DF	5	(Palestine) Omar Jarun
DF	27	(Poland) Marcin Woźniak
MF	17	(Poland) Maksymilian Rogalski		(yellow card) 26'
MF	16	(Poland) Robert Mandrysz	(substituted off) 82'	(yellow card) 26'
MF	14	(Poland) Maciej Mysiak
MF	6	(Poland) Przemysław Pietruszka
FW	33	(Poland) Marcin Bojarski	(substituted off) 68'	(yellow card) 26'
FW	78	(Poland) Olgierd Moskalewicz
Substitutes:
FW	7	(Poland) Mikołaj Lebedyński	(substituted on) 60'
FW	19	(Poland) Piotr Dziuba	(substituted on) 68'
MF	18	(Poland) Daniel Wólkiewicz	(substituted on) 82'
Manager:
(Poland) Piotr Mandrysz

GK	33	(Poland) Rafał Gikiewicz
DF	4	(Poland) Igor Lewczuk	(substituted off) 67'
DF	5	(Lithuania) Andrius Skerla
DF	14	(Morocco) El Mehdi Sidqy
DF	17	(Chile) Alexis Norambuena	Booked
MF	32	(Brazil) Bruno Coutinho
MF	11	(Brazil) Hermes
MF	22	(Poland) Rafał Grzyb
MF	13	(Poland) Jarosław Lato
FW	21	(Poland) Tomasz Frankowski	(substituted off) 80'
FW	10	(Poland) Kamil Grosicki
Substitutes:
MF	23	(Poland) Marcin Burkhardt	(substituted on) 67'
FW	9	(Poland) Remigiusz Jezierski	(substituted on) 73'
DF	24	(Poland) Dariusz Jarecki	(substituted on) 80'
Manager:
(Poland) Michał Probierz

== Top goalscorers ==
Source: 90minut.pl

4 goals

- (Poland) Piotr Dziuba (Pogoń Szczecin)
- (Poland) Tomasz Kempiński (Piast Kobylin)
- (Poland) Tomasz Frankowski (Jagiellonia Białystok)

3 goals

- (Poland) Paweł Buzała (Lechia Gdańsk)
- (Poland) Wojciech Fabianowski (Sandecja Nowy Sącz)
- (Poland) Michał Filipowicz (Zagłębie Sosnowiec)
- (Poland) Hubert Jaromin (Zagłębie Sosnowiec)
- (Poland) Mikołaj Lebedyński (Pogoń Szczecin)
- (Poland) Iwan Łytwyniuk (Hetman Zamość)
- (Poland) Patryk Małecki (Wisła Kraków)
- (Guinea) Ousmane Sylla (Polonia Słubice)
- (Poland) Mateusz Wróbel (GKS Tychy)

== See also ==
- 2009–10 Ekstraklasa
