= 2010 Polish Super Cup =

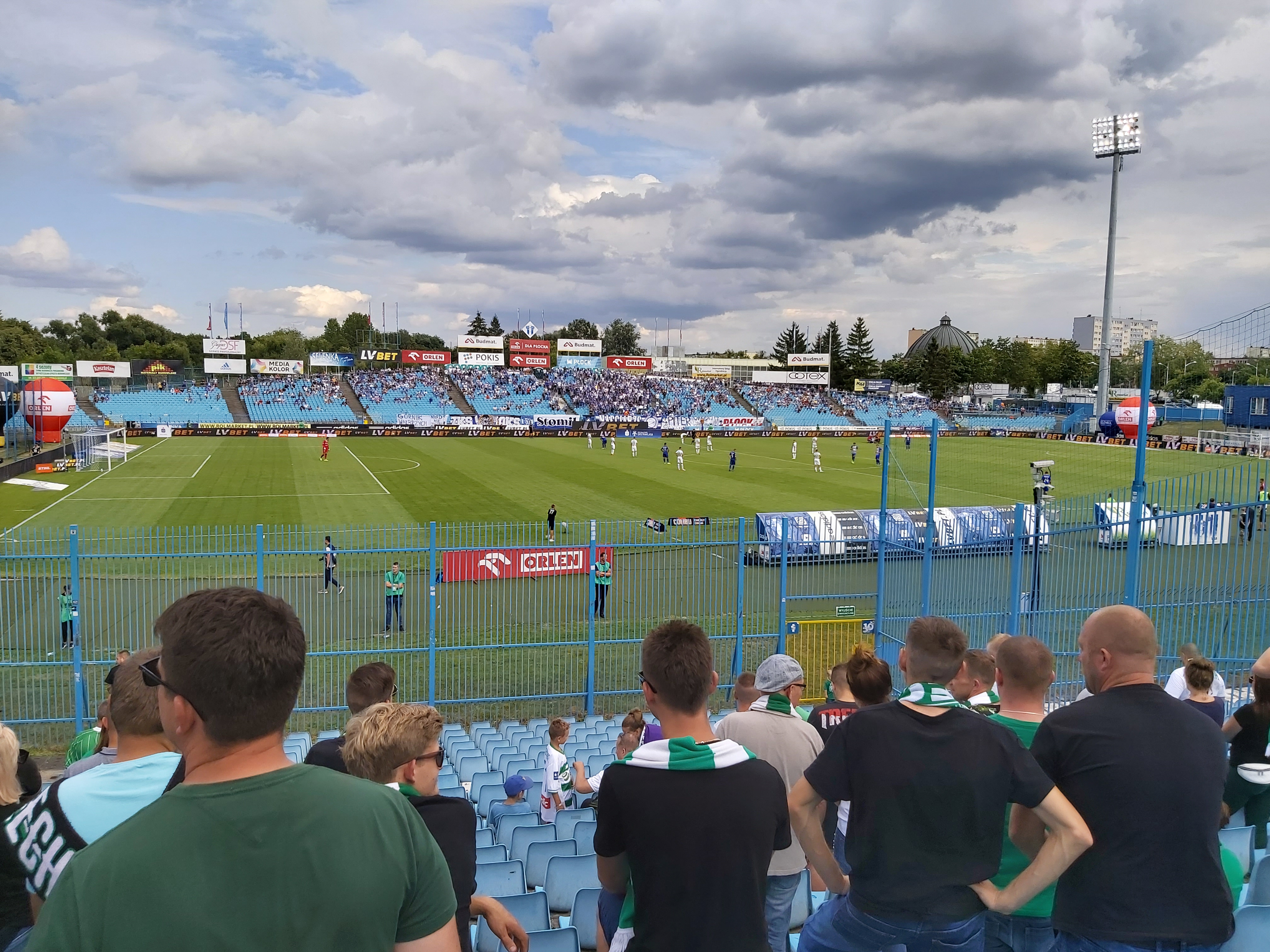
- The Stadion im. Kazimierza Górskiego in Płock hosted the final.
Lech Poznań	Jagiellonia Białystok
0	1
- Date: 1 August 2010
- Venue: Stadion im. Kazimierza Górskiego, Płock
- Referee: Marai Al-Awaji (Saudi Arabia)
- Attendance: 7,000

The 2010 Polish Super Cup was held on 1 August 2010 between the 2009–10 Ekstraklasa winners Lech Poznań and the 2009–10 Polish Cup winners Jagiellonia Białystok. Jagiellonia Białystok won the fixture 1–0, winning the trophy for the first time in their history.

== Match details ==
1 August 2010
17:00 CEST (UTC+02:00)

Lech Poznań	0–1	Jagiellonia Białystok
	90minut Soccerway	Frankowski 83'

Stadion im. Kazimierza Górskiego, Płock
Attendance: 7,000
Referee: Marai Al-Awaji (Saudi Arabia)

Lech Poznań:
GK	30	(Bosnia and Herzegovina) Jasmin Burić
DF	19	(Poland) Bartosz Bosacki
DF	25	(Panama) Luis Henríquez
DF	3	(Serbia) Ivan Đurđević		(substituted off) 18'
DF	23	(Poland) Marcin Kikut	Yellow card
MF	7	(Poland) Jakub Wilk	Yellow card
MF	17	(Poland) Sławomir Peszko		(substituted off) 70'
MF	10	(Belarus) Sergey Krivets
MF	32	(Poland) Mateusz Możdżeń	Yellow card
FW	13	(Slovakia) Ján Zápotoka		(substituted off) 46'
FW	20	(Netherlands) Joël Tshibamba
Substitutes:
GK	27	(Poland) Krzysztof Kotorowski
DF	2	(Poland) Seweryn Gancarczyk
DF	11	(Poland) Bartosz Bereszyński
DF	35	(Poland) Marcin Kamiński		(substituted on) 18'
MF	14	(Bosnia and Herzegovina) Semir Štilić		(substituted on) 70'
MF	21	(Serbia) Dimitrije Injac
FW	15	(Poland) Kamil Drygas
FW	26	(Poland) Tomasz Mikołajczak		(substituted on) 46'
Manager:
(Poland) Jacek Zieliński

Jagiellonia Białystok:
GK	12	(Poland) Grzegorz Sandomierski	Yellow card
DF	5	(Lithuania) Andrius Skerla
DF	17	(Palestine) Alexis Norambuena
DF	15	(Poland) Thiago Cionek
DF	27	(Poland) Krzysztof Hus
MF	11	(Brazil) Hermes Neves Soares		(substituted off) 46'
MF	23	(Poland) Marcin Burkhardt
MF	10	(Poland) Kamil Grosicki
MF	22	(Poland) Rafał Grzyb
FW	8	(Poland) Tomasz Kupisz	Yellow card	(substituted off) 75'
FW	9	(Poland) Przemysław Trytko		(substituted off) 46'
Substitutes:
GK	1	(Poland) Jakub Słowik
DF	14	(Morocco) El Mehdi Sidqy
DF	24	(Lithuania) Tadas Kijanskas
MF	3	(Montenegro) Mladen Kašćelan	Yellow card	(substituted on) 46'
MF	13	(Poland) Jarosław Lato		(substituted on) 46'
MF	20	(Poland) Maciej Makuszewski
FW	21	(Poland) Tomasz Frankowski		(substituted on) 75'
Manager:
(Poland) Michał Probierz

== See also ==
- 2010–11 Ekstraklasa
- 2010–11 Polish Cup
