= 2009 Polish Super Cup =

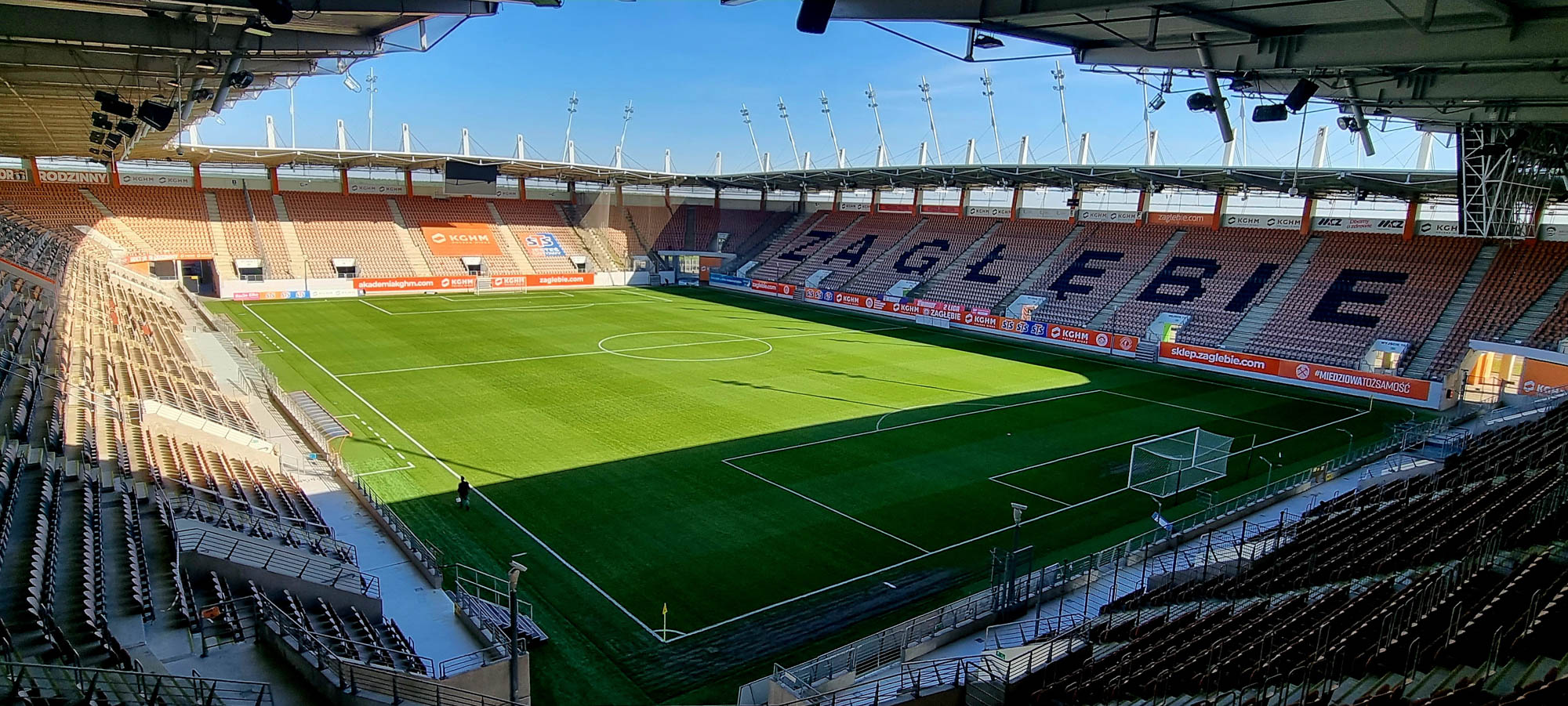
- The Lubin Stadium in Lubin hosted the final.
Wisła Kraków	Lech Poznań
1	1
- Lech Poznań won 3–4 on penalties
- Date: 27 July 2009
- Venue: Lubin Stadium, Lubin
- Referee: Paweł Gil (Lubin)
- Attendance: 8,000

The 2009 Polish Super Cup, known then as the 2009 Ekstraklasa Super Cup, was held on 27 July 2009 between the 2008–09 Ekstraklasa winners Wisła Kraków and the 2008–09 Polish Cup winners Lech Poznań. Lech Poznań won the match on penalties after the match finished 1–1, winning the trophy for the fourth time in their history.

== Match details ==
27 July 2009
17:00 CEST (UTC+02:00)

Wisła Kraków	1–1	Lech Poznań
Díaz 37'	90minut Soccerway	Lewandowski 9'
Penalties
Głowacki (penalty scored); Kirm (penalty scored); Paweł Brożek (penalty scored); Piotr Brożek (penalty missed); Małecki (penalty missed)	3–4	(penalty scored) Bosacki; (penalty scored) Đurđević; (penalty scored) Lewandowski; (penalty scored) Peszko

Stadion Miejski Wisły, Kraków
Attendance: 8,000
Referee: Paweł Gil (Lubin)

Wisła Kraków:
GK	81	(Poland) Mariusz Pawełek
DF	3	(Brazil) Marcelo	Yellow card
DF	4	(Poland) Arkadiusz Głowacki
DF	8	(Poland) Piotr Brożek
DF	11	(Uruguay) Pablo Álvarez
DF	15	(Costa Rica) Júnior Díaz	Yellow card	(substituted off) 67'
MF	7	(Poland) Radosław Sobolewski
MF	17	(Slovenia) Andraž Kirm
FW	19	(Poland) Patryk Małecki
FW	86	(Poland) Piotr Ćwielong		(substituted off) 72'
FW	23	(Poland) Paweł Brożek	Yellow card
Substitutes:
MF	16	(Czech Republic) Tomáš Jirsák		(substituted on) 67'
FW	21	(Poland) Wojciech Łobodziński		(substituted on) 72'
Manager:
(Poland) Maciej Skorża

Lech Poznań:
GK	1	(Poland) Grzegorz Kasprzik
DF	2	(Poland) Bartosz Bosacki
DF	5	(Colombia) Manuel Arboleda
DF	23	(Poland) Marcin Kikut
MF	3	(Serbia) Ivan Đurđević
MF	6	(Poland) Tomasz Bandrowski
MF	7	(Poland) Jakub Wilk	(substituted off) 75'
MF	14	(Bosnia and Herzegovina) Semir Štilić
FW	17	(Poland) Sławomir Peszko
FW	11	(Peru) Hernán Rengifo	(substituted off) 72'
FW	8	(Poland) Robert Lewandowski
Substitutes:
FW	15	(Bosnia and Herzegovina) Haris Handžić	(substituted on) 75'
FW	24	(Poland) Krzysztof Chrapek	(substituted on) 72'
Manager:
(Poland) Jacek Zieliński

== See also ==
- 2009–10 Ekstraklasa
- 2009–10 Polish Cup
