= Tomasz Bandrowski =

Polish footballer

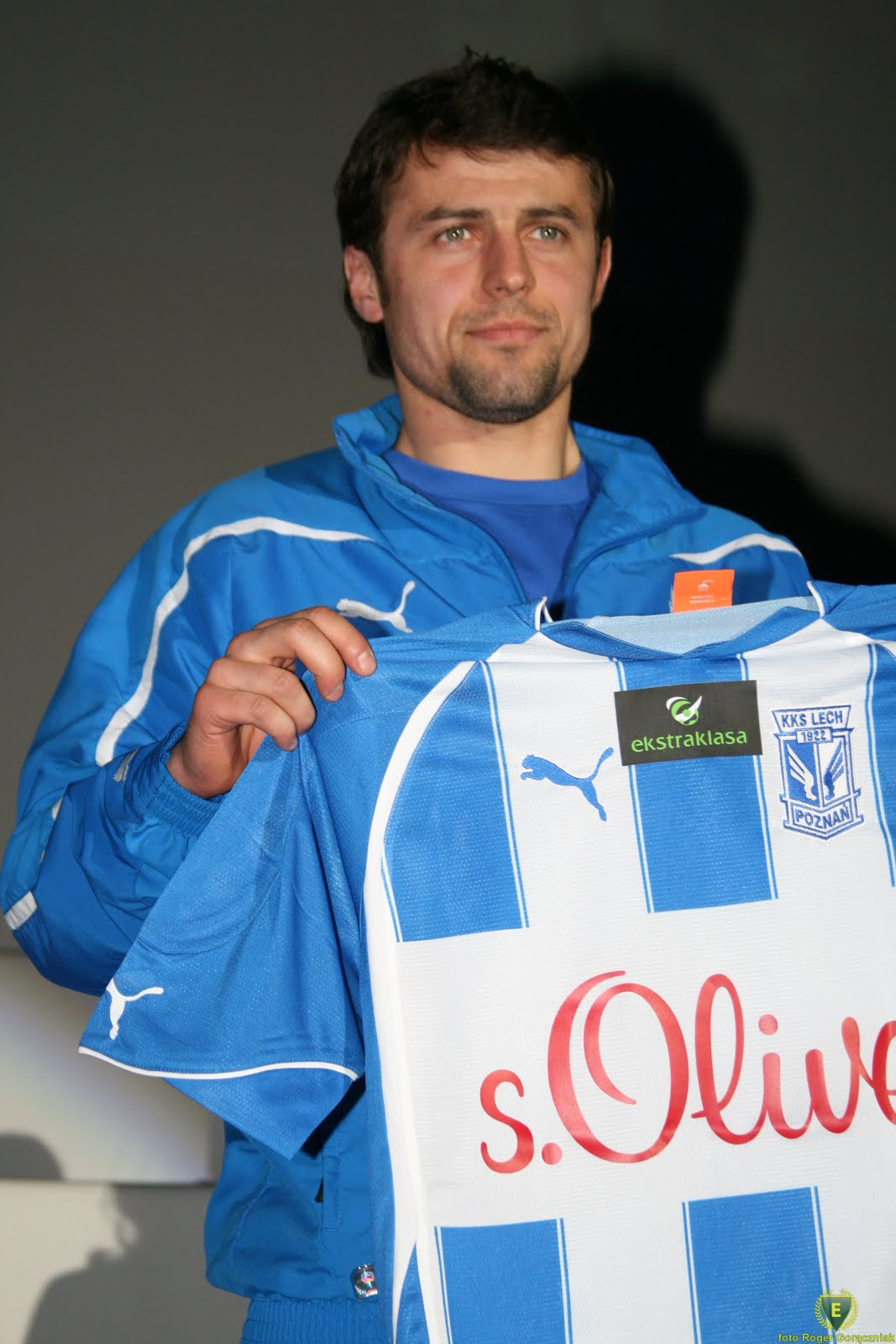
- Tomasz Bandrowski in 2011

Personal information
- Full name: Tomasz Bandrowski
- Date of birth: 18 September 1984 (age 42)
- Place of birth: Pyskowice, Poland
- Height: 1.77 m (5 ft 10 in)
- Position: Midfielder

Youth career
- LZS Zryw Pawłowiczki
- Gwarek Zabrze

Senior career*
Years	Team	Apps	(Gls)
2003–2008	Energie Cottbus	37	(0)
2008–2011	Lech Poznań	70	(2)
2012–2014	Jagiellonia Białystok	37	(0)
2013–2014	Jagiellonia Białystok II	14	(0)
Total		158	(2)

International career
2008–2010	Poland	7	(0)
- * Club domestic league appearances and goals

Tomasz Bandrowski (born 18 September 1984) is a Polish former professional footballer who played as a midfielder.

He debuted for the Poland national team on 6 September 2008 against Slovenia.

== Honours ==
Lech Poznań

- Ekstraklasa: 2009–10
- Polish Cup: 2008–09
- Polish Super Cup: 2009
