= Kasprzik =

Kasprzik is a surname. Notable people with the surname include:

- Grzegorz Kasprzik (born 1983), Polish footballer
- Hans-Joachim Kasprzik (1928–1997), German politician
- Julian Kasprzik, member of the German pop band Room 2012
- Tomasz Kasprzik (born 1993), Polish footballer
