= Bruno Coutinho =

Bruno Coutinho may refer to:

- Bruno Coutinho (footballer, born 1969), Indian footballer
- Bruno Coutinho (footballer, born 1986), Brazilian footballer
