= Chrapek =

Chrapek is a Polish surname. Notable people with the surname include:

- Jan Chrapek (1948–2001), Polish bishop
- Karolina Chrapek (born 1990), Polish alpine skier
- Krzysztof Chrapek (born 1985), Polish footballer
- Michał Chrapek (born 1992), Polish footballer
