= Krzysztof Chrapek =

Polish football player

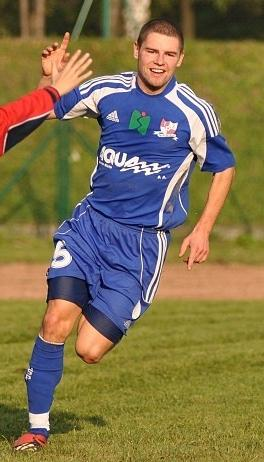

Personal information
- Full name: Krzysztof Chrapek
- Date of birth: October 7, 1985 (age 41)
- Place of birth: Czechowice-Dziedzice, Poland
- Height: 1.70 m (5 ft 7 in)
- Position: Forward

Team information
- Current team: Niwa Nowa Wieś
- Number: 7

Youth career
- Górnik Brzeszcze
- LKS Jawiszowice

Senior career*
Years	Team	Apps	(Gls)
2002–2006	Górnik Brzeszcze		
2006–2009	Podbeskidzie Bielsko-Biała	101	(29)
2009–2012	Lech Poznań	12	(0)
2013	Pasjonat Dankowice		
2013–2015	Podbeskidzie Bielsko-Biała	32	(4)
2016–2017	BKS Stal Bielsko-Biała	41	(11)
2017–2019	MRKS Czechowice-Dziedzice		
2019–2020	LKS Jawiszowice	17	(9)
2020–	Niwa Nowa Wieś	83	(40)
- * Club domestic league appearances and goals as of 15:09, 27 June 2025 (UTC)

Krzysztof Chrapek (born 7 October 1985) is a Polish professional footballer who plays as a forward for Niwa Nowa Wieś.

== Career ==
Chrapek played for Górnik Brzeszcze and LKS Jawiszowice. In 2006, he was transferred to Podbeskidzie Bielsko-Biała. He made his first team debut on March 25 against Śląsk Wrocław and scored his first goal for Podbeskidzie in a victory over KSZO Ostrowiec Świętokrzyski. Chrapek finished the 2005–06 season with fourteen appearances and four goals. During the next seasons Chrapek was a first-choice forward in Podbeskidzie. Until 2009 he made 101 league appearances for that club and scored 29 goals.

On 10 July 2009 he signed a four-year contract with Lech Poznań. On 25 July, he made his debut for Lech in a Polish Super Cup final against Wisła Kraków. In Ekstraklasa, he debuted in a 3–1 away victory over Piast Gliwice.

== Honours ==
Lech Poznań

- Ekstraklasa: 2009–10
- Polish Super Cup: 2009

MRKS Czechowice-Dziedzice

- Regional league Bielsko-Biała: 2017–18

Niwa Nowa Wieś

- V liga Lesser Poland (West): 2022–23
- Polish Cup (Oświęcim regionals): 2022–23
