= Piotr Klepczarek =

Polish footballer

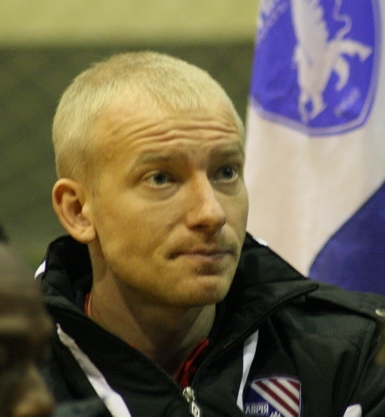

Personal information
- Full name: Piotr Grzegorz Klepczarek
- Date of birth: 13 August 1982 (age 44)
- Place of birth: Łódź, Poland
- Height: 1.80 m (5 ft 11 in)
- Position: Defender

Senior career*
Years	Team	Apps	(Gls)
2000–2003	ŁKS Łódź		
2003–2004	Unia Janikowo		
2004–2005	Kujawiak Włocławek	29	(3)
2005–2007	GKS Bełchatów	29	(3)
2007	Wisła Płock	8	(1)
2008	UKS SMS Łódź	9	(0)
2008–2009	GKS Bełchatów	4	(1)
2009–2010	ŁKS Łódź	17	(0)
2010	Jagiellonia Białystok	2	(0)
2011	Tavriya Simferopol	0	(0)
2011	KSZO Ostrowiec	12	(1)
2012	Stal Rzeszów	11	(1)
2012–2013	Motor Lublin	30	(0)
2013–2015	Sokół Aleksandrów Łódzki	63	(3)
- * Club domestic league appearances and goals

Piotr Grzegorz Klepczarek (born 13 August 1982) is a Polish former professional footballer who played as a defender.

== Career ==
=== Club ===
In January 2011, he joined Ukrainian Premier League side Tavriya Simferopol on a two-year contract.

== Honours ==
Jagiellonia Białystok

- Polish Cup: 2009–10
