= Tomasz Kasprzik =

Polish footballer

Personal information
- Full name: Tomasz Kasprzik
- Date of birth: 2 January 1993 (age 33)
- Place of birth: Pyskowice, Poland
- Height: 1.81 m (5 ft 11 1/2 in)
- Position: Goalkeeper

Team information
- Current team: ŁTS Łabędy
- Number: 21

Youth career
- 2009: Górnik Zabrze

Senior career*
Years	Team	Apps	(Gls)
2009–2012	Piast Gliwice	2	(0)
2010	→ Olimpia Elbląg (loan)	1	(0)
2011–2012	→ LZS Leśnica (loan)	35	(0)
2012–2013	Ruch Zdzieszowice	32	(0)
2013–2014	LZS Leśnica	9	(0)
2014–2015	Ruch Zdzieszowice	40	(0)
2015–2016	Nadwiślan Góra	6	(0)
2016–	ŁTS Łabędy		

International career
	Poland U17	5	(0)
2010	Poland U18	1	(0)
- * Club domestic league appearances and goals as of 22:25, 26 September 2024 (UTC)

Tomasz Kasprzik (born 2 January 1993) is a Polish footballer who plays as a goalkeeper for ŁTS Łabędy. His brother Grzegorz was also a goalkeeper.

== Career ==
=== Club ===
In the summer of 2010, he was loaned to Olimpia Elbląg.

In January 2011, he was loaned to LZS Leśnica on a half-year deal.

=== International ===
He was a part of Poland national under-18 team.

== Honours ==
ŁTS Łabędy

- Klasa A Zabrze: 2018–19
