= Marcin Kikut =

Polish footballer (born 1983)

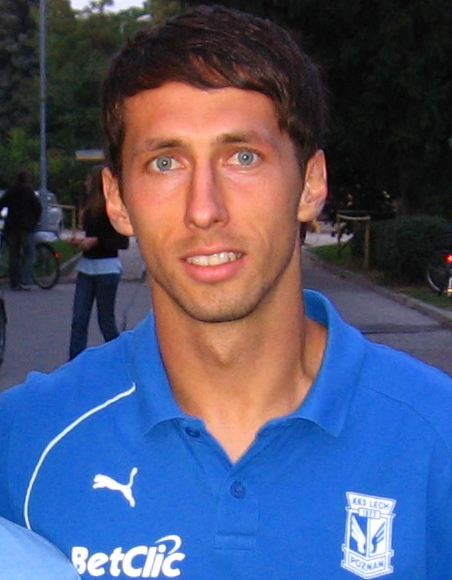
- Kikut in 2009

Personal information
- Date of birth: 25 June 1983 (age 43)
- Place of birth: Barlinek, Poland
- Height: 1.79 m (5 ft 10 in)
- Positions: Defender; midfielder

Senior career*
| Years | Team | Apps | (Gls) |
| –2001 | Pogoń Barlinek | | |
| 2002–2004 | Amica Wronki II | | |
| 2004–2006 | Amica Wronki | 47 | (6) |
| 2006–2012 | Lech Poznań | 106 | (1) |
| 2012–2013 | Ruch Chorzów | 14 | (0) |
| 2014 | Widzew Łódź | 8 | (0) |
| 2014–2015 | Bytovia Bytów | 8 | (0) |
| 2015 | Formacja Port 2000 Mostki | 16 | (0) |
| 2016–2017 | Tarnovia Tarnowo Podgórne | 43 | (6) |
| 2020–2022 | Korona Zakrzewo | 16 | (3) |

International career
| 2004–2005 | Poland U21 | | |
| 2010–2011 | Poland | 2 | (0) |
- * Club domestic league appearances and goals

Marcin Kikut (born 25 June 1983) is a Polish former professional footballer who played as a defender or a midfielder.

== Career ==
His former club was Amica Wronki. In August 2012, he joined Ruch Chorzów. Kikut was also a member of Poland U21 team. He made his debut for senior national team on 10 December 2010.

== Honours ==
Lech Poznań

- Ekstraklasa: 2009–10
- Polish Cup: 2008–09
- Polish Super Cup: 2009
