= Abraham Lewysohn =

Silesian Hebraist and rabbi (1805–1860)

Abraham Lewysohn (6 December 1805 – 14 February 1860) was a Hebraist and rabbi of Peiskretscham, Upper Silesia. He left a large number of manuscripts, several hundred sermons in Hebrew and Danish, novellae on the Talmud, verses, a German work on Hebrew grammar, and a work titled Dorot Tannaim wa-Amoraim, a history of the Tannaim and Amoraim, the introduction to which, titled "Parnasat chakme ha-Talmud," was published in Kobak's Jeschurun (i, part 3, p. 81).

== Publications ==
- Me'ore Minhagim (Berlin, 1846), a critical essay on religious customs according to the Talmud, Posekim, and Midrashim (this work was afterward plagiarized by Finkelstein, Vienna, 1851);
- Shete Derashot (Gleiwitz, 1856), sermons;
- Toledot R. Yehoshua' ben Ḥananyah, biography of R. Joshua b. Hananiah (in Keller's Bikkurim, 1865);
- Toledot Rab, biography of Rab or Abba Arika (Kobak's Jeschurun, vi and vii). Lewysohn was also a regular contributor to Ha-Maggid and to Klein's Jahrbuch.
