= Grzegorz Kasprzik =

Polish-German footballer

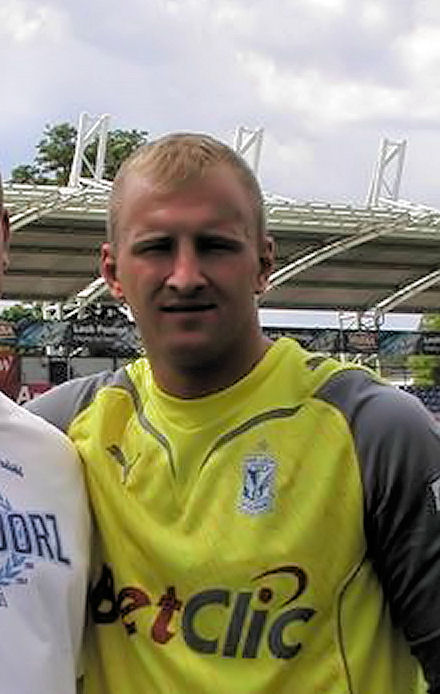
- Kasprzik with Lech Poznań in 2009

Personal information
- Date of birth: 20 September 1983 (age 43)
- Place of birth: Pyskowice, Poland
- Height: 1.87 m (6 ft 2 in)
- Position: Goalkeeper

Youth career
- Górnik Zabrze
- Hamburger SV

Senior career*
Years	Team	Apps	(Gls)
- Górnik Zabrze II
2005–2007	Przyszłość Ciochowice		
2007–2009	Piast Gliwice	64	(0)
2009–2011	Lech Poznań	8	(0)
2012–2013	Flota Świnoujście	33	(0)
2013	Termalica Bruk-Bet Nieciecza	4	(0)
2014–2018	Górnik Zabrze	47	(0)
2014–2017	Górnik Zabrze II	27	(0)
2019	Ruch Radzionków	0	(0)
2019	Dąb Gaszowice	17	(0)
2020–2022	Start Sierakowice	32	(0)
- * Club domestic league appearances and goals

Grzegorz Kasprzik (born 20 September 1983) is a Polish former professional footballer who played as a goalkeeper. He also holds German citizenship.

== Career ==
Kasprzik began his career with Górnik Zabrze. Later he played for youth teams of Hamburger SV. In 2005, after playing for Górnik Zabrze's reserves, Kasprzik moved to Przyszłość Ciochowice, and two years later, he joined Piast Gliwice. In 2009, he became a Lech Poznań player.

In the summer 2019, Kasprzik joined Dąb Gaszowice.

== Personal life ==
Kasprzik's younger brother, Tomasz is also goalkeeper.

== Honours ==
Lech Poznań

- Ekstraklasa: 2009–10
- Polish Super Cup: 2009

Start Sierakowice

- Klasa A Zabrze: 2020–21
