= Maciej Tataj =

Polish footballer

Personal information
- Date of birth: 9 January 1980 (age 46)
- Place of birth: Warsaw, Poland
- Height: 1.81 m (5 ft 11 1/2 in)
- Position: Striker

Team information
- Current team: Orzeł Kampinos; SEMP Ursynów (manager)
- Number: 7

Youth career
- 1990–1999: Agrykola Warsaw

Senior career*
Years	Team	Apps	(Gls)
1999–2004	Okęcie Warsaw		
2004–2005	Mazowsze Grójec		
2005–2006	GLKS Nadarzyn		
2006–2008	Polonia Warsaw	34	(6)
2007	→ Vaasan Palloseura (loan)	1	(0)
2008	→ Dolcan Ząbki (loan)	14	(19)
2008–2010	Dolcan Ząbki	51	(21)
2010–2012	Korona Kielce	31	(6)
2011–2012	→ Dolcan Ząbki (loan)	31	(15)
2012–2013	Dolcan Ząbki	19	(6)
2013–2014	→ Motor Lublin (loan)	31	(22)
2014–2015	Pogoń Siedlce	15	(2)
2015–2016	Pogoń Grodzisk Mazowiecki	39	(21)
2016	Victoria Sulejówek		
2021	Laura Chylice	5	(4)
2022–	Orzeł Kampinos	74	(146)

Managerial career
- 2019–2022: Laura Chylice
- 2022: Ząbkovia Ząbki
- 2022–2023: Mszczonowianka Mszczonów
- 2024–: SEMP Ursynów
- * Club domestic league appearances and goals as of 17:40, 24 June 2025 (UTC)

Maciej Tataj (born 9 January 1980) is a Polish football manager and player. He plays for regional league club Orzeł Kampinos and is in charge of SEMP Ursynów.

== Career ==
Tataj started his career with Okęcie Warsaw.

In July 2011, he was loaned to Dolcan Ząbki on a one-year deal.

== Honours ==
Dolcan Ząbki

- III liga, group I: 2007–08

Orzeł Kampinos

- Klasa A Warsaw IV: 2023–24

Individual

- I liga Player of the Year: 2009
- II liga East top scorer: 2013–14
- III liga, group I top scorer: 2007–08
