= Jakub Wilk =

Polish footballer (born 1985)

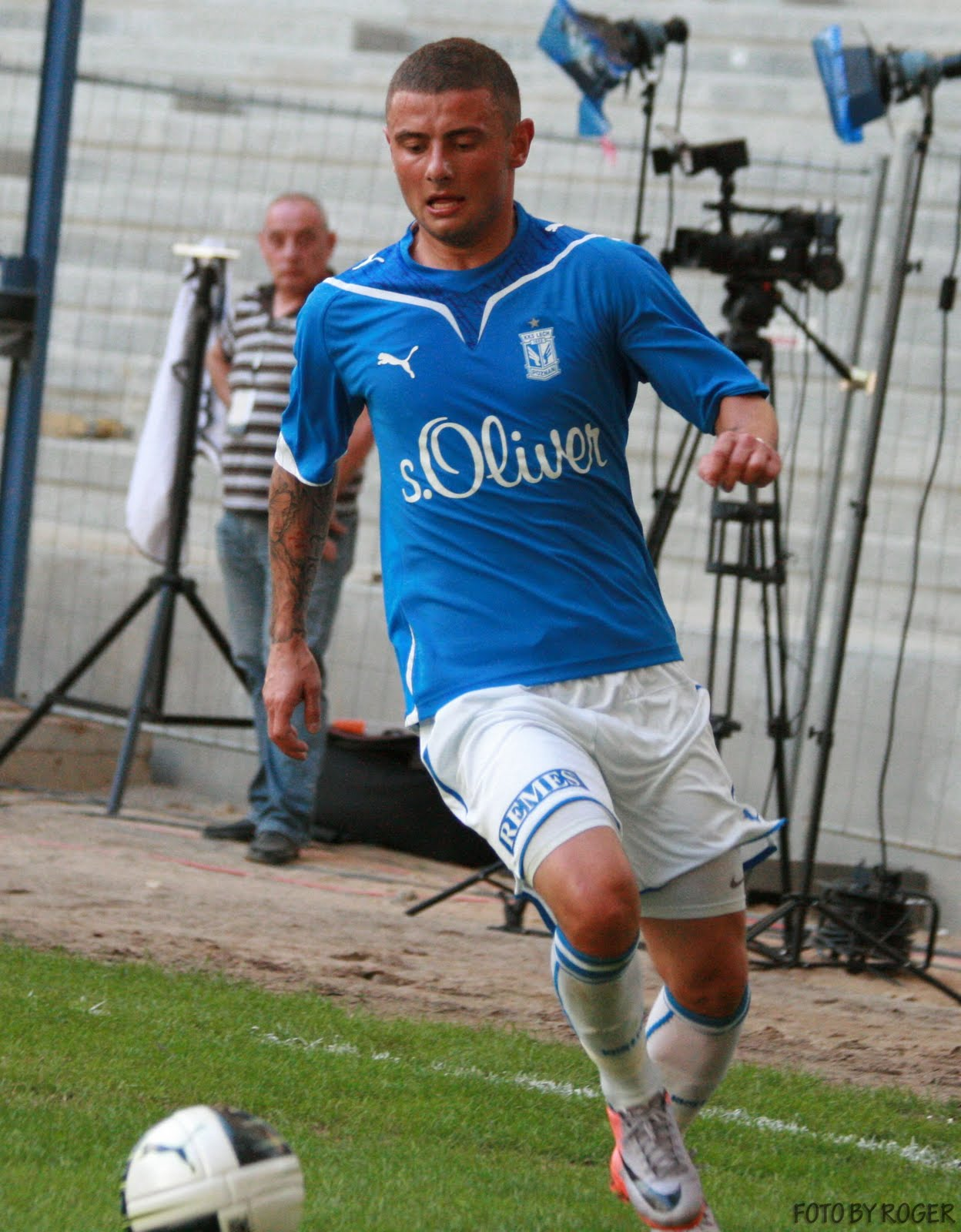
- Wilk playing for Lech Poznań in 2010

Personal information
- Full name: Jakub Wilk
- Date of birth: 11 July 1985 (age 41)
- Place of birth: Poznań, Poland
- Height: 1.77 m (5 ft 9 1/2 in)
- Position: Left midfielder

Team information
- Current team: Lech Poznań U17 (assistant)

Youth career
- 2003–2005: Lech Poznań

Senior career*
| Years | Team | Apps | (Gls) |
| 2005–2013 | Lech Poznań | 148 | (16) |
| 2012 | → Lechia Gdańsk (loan) | 12 | (2) |
| 2013 | Žalgiris | 16 | (6) |
| 2013 | Vaslui | 13 | (1) |
| 2014–2015 | Žalgiris | 45 | (13) |
| 2015–2017 | Zagłębie Sosnowiec | 26 | (0) |
| 2017–2018 | Bytovia Bytów | 31 | (1) |
| 2018–2020 | Polonia Środa | 49 | (5) |
| 2020–2021 | Tarnovia Tarnowo Podgórne | 30 | (7) |
| 2021–2024 | Wiara Lecha Poznań | 63 | (24) |
| 2024–2025 | Helios Bucz | 15 | (2) |

International career
| 2009 | Poland | 3 | (0) |
- * Club domestic league appearances and goals as of 14:23, 21 June 2025 (UTC)

Jakub Wilk (born 11 July 1985) is a Polish professional footballer who plays as a left midfielder. He currently serves as an assistant coach of Lech Poznań's under-17 team.

== Club career ==
He is one of the youngest players to make their debut in Ekstraklasa. He started playing for SKS 13 Poznań in 2002. He played for Lech Poznań II from 2003 until the fall of 2005. He was then promoted to the first team roster.

On 27 January 2012, he was loaned out to Lechia Gdańsk until the end of the 2011–12 season. On 25 February 2013, Wilk signed a contract with Lithuanian side Žalgiris Vilnius. In half-a-season in Vilnius, Wilk has played 20 matches, scoring 7 goals and having 13 assists.

== International career ==
He debuted for Poland in a friendly versus Lithuania in February 2009.

== Career statistics ==
=== Club ===
As of match played 15 June 2025

Appearances and goals by club, season and competition
| Club | Season | League | | | National cup (Note: Includes Polish Cup, Lithuanian Cup, Cupa României) | | Europe | | Other | | Total | |
| Club | Season | Division | Apps | Goals | Apps | Goals | Apps | Goals | Apps | Goals | Apps | Goals |
|---|---|---|---|---|---|---|---|---|---|---|---|---|
| Lech Poznań | 2005–06 | Ekstraklasa | 10 | 0 | 1 | 0 | 1 (Note: Appearance in UEFA Intertoto Cup) | 0 | — | | 12 | 0 |
| Lech Poznań | 2006–07 | Ekstraklasa | 29 | 2 | 4 | 0 | — | | 3 (Note: Appearances in Ekstraklasa Cup) | 0 | 36 | 2 |
| Lech Poznań | 2007–08 | Ekstraklasa | 23 | 3 | 1 | 0 | — | | 3 | 2 | 27 | 5 |
| Lech Poznań | 2008–09 | Ekstraklasa | 26 | 3 | 7 | 0 | 10 (Note: Appearances in UEFA Cup) | 0 | 3 | 0 | 46 | 3 |
| Lech Poznań | 2009–10 | Ekstraklasa | 20 | 3 | 0 | 0 | 4 (Note: Appearances in UEFA Europa League) | 1 | 1 (Note: Appearance in Polish Super Cup) | 0 | 25 | 4 |
| Lech Poznań | 2010–11 | Ekstraklasa | 22 | 5 | 6 | 1 | 11 (Note: Four appearances in UEFA Champions League, seven appearances in UEFA Europa League) | 0 | 1 | 0 | 40 | 6 |
| Lech Poznań | 2011–12 | Ekstraklasa | 13 | 0 | 2 | 0 | — | | — | | 15 | 0 |
| Lech Poznań | 2012–13 | Ekstraklasa | 5 | 0 | 0 | 0 | 2 | 0 | — | | 7 | 0 |
| Lech Poznań | Total | | 148 | 16 | 21 | 1 | 28 | 1 | 11 | 2 | 208 | 20 |
| Lechia Gdańsk (loan) | 2011–12 | Ekstraklasa | 12 | 2 | 0 | 0 | — | | — | | 12 | 2 |
| Žalgiris | 2013 | A Lyga | 16 | 6 | 3 | 0 | — | | 1 | 0 | 20 | 6 |
| Vaslui | 2013–14 | Liga I | 13 | 1 | 2 | 0 | — | | — | | 15 | 1 |
| Žalgiris | 2014 | A Lyga | 31 | 10 | 3 | 1 | 2 (Note: Appearances in UEFA Champions League) | 0 | — | | 36 | 11 |
| Žalgiris | 2015 | A Lyga | 14 | 3 | 6 | 2 | — | | — | | 20 | 5 |
| Žalgiris | Total | | 45 | 13 | 9 | 3 | 2 | 0 | — | | 56 | 16 |
| Zagłębie Sosnowiec | 2015–16 | I liga | 14 | 0 | 3 | 0 | — | | — | | 17 | 0 |
| Zagłębie Sosnowiec | 2016–17 | I liga | 12 | 0 | 2 | 1 | — | | — | | 14 | 1 |
| Zagłębie Sosnowiec | Total | | 26 | 0 | 5 | 1 | — | | — | | 31 | 1 |
| Bytovia Bytów | 2016–17 | I liga | 13 | 1 | — | | — | | 2 (Note: Appearances in I liga promotion/relegation play-offs) | 0 | 15 | 1 |
| Bytovia Bytów | 2017–18 | I liga | 16 | 0 | 5 | 0 | — | | — | | 21 | 0 |
| Bytovia Bytów | Total | | 29 | 1 | 5 | 0 | — | | 2 | 0 | 36 | 1 |
| Polonia Środa Wielkopolska | 2018–19 | III liga, group II | 32 | 4 | 2 | 1 | — | | — | | 34 | 5 |
| Polonia Środa Wielkopolska | 2019–20 | III liga, group II | 17 | 1 | 1 | 0 | — | | — | | 18 | 1 |
| Polonia Środa Wielkopolska | Total | | 49 | 5 | 3 | 1 | — | | — | | 52 | 6 |
| Tarnovia Tarnowo Podgórne | 2020–21 | IV liga Greater Poland | 30 | 7 | — | | — | | — | | 30 | 7 |
| Wiara Lecha Poznań | 2021–22 | V liga Greater Poland I | 26 | 9 | — | | — | | 1 (Note: Appearance in V liga promotion play-offs) | 0 | 27 | 9 |
| Wiara Lecha Poznań | 2022–23 | V liga Greater Poland II | 23 | 11 | — | | — | | — | | 23 | 11 |
| Wiara Lecha Poznań | 2023–24 | IV liga Greater Poland | 13 | 4 | — | | — | | — | | 13 | 4 |
| Wiara Lecha Poznań | Total | | 62 | 24 | — | | — | | 1 | 0 | 63 | 24 |
| Helios Bucz | 2024–25 | Regional league | 15 | 2 | — | | — | | — | | 15 | 2 |
| Career total | | | 445 | 77 | 48 | 6 | 30 | 1 | 15 | 2 | 538 | 86 |

=== International ===
Appearances and goals by national team and year
| National team | Year | Apps | Goals |
|---|---|---|---|
Poland
| Poland | 2009 | 3 | 0 |
| Total | | 3 | 0 |

== Honours ==
Lech Poznań

- Ekstraklasa: 2009–10
- Polish Cup: 2008–09
- Polish Super Cup: 2009

Žalgiris Vilnius

- A Lyga: 2013, 2014, 2015
- Lithuanian Cup: 2012–13, 2013–14, 2014–15
- Lithuanian Supercup: 2013

Polonia Środa Wielkopolska

- Polish Cup (Greater Poland regionals): 2018–19
- Polish Cup (Poznań regionals): 2018–19

Wiara Lecha Poznań

- V liga Greater Poland II: 2022–23
