= Remigiusz Jezierski =

Polish footballer

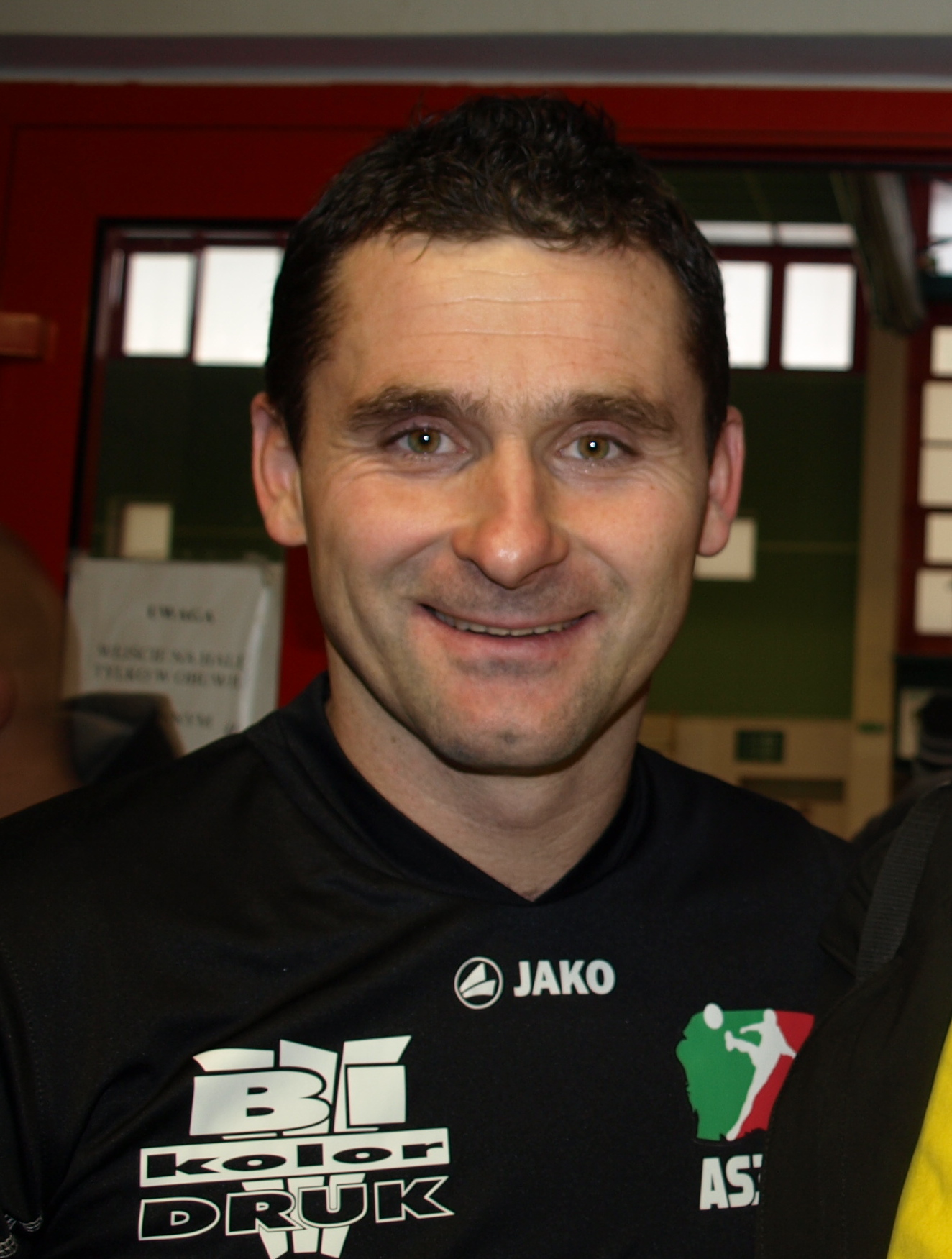
- Jezierski in 2013

Personal information
- Full name: Remigiusz Jezierski
- Date of birth: 19 January 1976 (age 50)
- Place of birth: Świdnica, Poland
- Height: 1.78 m (5 ft 10 in)
- Position: Striker

Team information
- Current team: Śląsk Wrocław (chairman)

Senior career*
Years	Team	Apps	(Gls)
1997	Polonia Świdnica		
1997–2002	Śląsk Wrocław	41+	(7+)
2002–2004	Hapoel Be'er Sheva	61	(14)
2004–2006	Górnik Łęczna	34	(5)
2006	→ Bnei Sakhnin (loan)	14	(0)
2007–2009	Ruch Chorzów	46	(9)
2009–2010	Jagiellonia Białystok	26	(4)
2010–2011	Śląsk Wrocław	11	(1)
- * Club domestic league appearances and goals

Remigiusz Jezierski (born 19 January 1976) is a Polish football executive, pundit and former professional player who played as a striker. He currently serves as the chairman of Ekstraklasa club Śląsk Wrocław.

== Career ==
Jezierski is a trainee of Polonia Świdnica. In October 2010, he re-joined Śląsk Wrocław on a one-year contract.

== Honours ==
Ruch Chorzów

- II liga: 2006–07

Jagiellonia Białystok

- Polish Cup: 2009–10
