= Alexis Norambuena =

Palestinian footballer (born 1984)

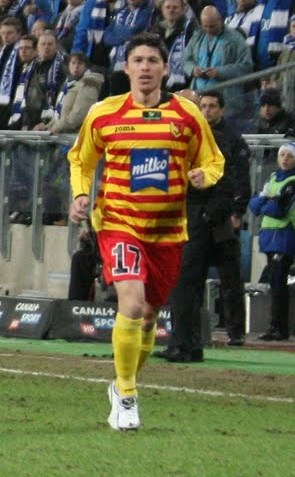
- Norambuena with Jagiellonia Białystok in 2011

Personal information
- Full name: Alexis Patricio Norambuena Ruz
- Date of birth: 31 March 1984 (age 42)
- Place of birth: Valdivia, Chile
- Height: 1.76 m (5 ft 9 1/2 in)
- Position: Defender

Youth career
- Unión Española

Senior career*
Years	Team	Apps	(Gls)
2003–2007	Unión Española	122	(1)
2008	Ñublense	6	(0)
2008–2013	Jagiellonia Białystok	146	(4)
2014	GKS Bełchatów	19	(0)
2016	Deportes La Serena	12	(0)
2016–2017	Shabab Al-Khalil	–	(–)
2017–2018	Deportes Melipilla	37	(0)
2019	Deportes Colina	10	(0)
Total		352	(5)

International career
2012–2019	Palestine	23	(1)
- * Club domestic league appearances and goals

Alexis Patricio Norambuena Ruz (Arabic: ألكسيس نورامبوينا; born 31 March 1984) is a former professional footballer who played as a defender. Born in Chile, he represented Palestine at international level. He retired in early 2019.

== Club career ==
Born in Valdivia, Chile, Norambuena is a product of Unión Española. He played for them between 2003 and 2007 and for Ñublense in 2008.

In 2008, Norambuena moved to Poland and spent seven years with both Jagiellonia Białystok and GKS Bełchatów.

Back to Chile in 2015, Norambuena joined Deportes La Serena for the 2016 Primera B. After a stint with Palestinian club Shabab Al-Khalil, Norambuena returned again to Chile and joined Deportes Melipilla in the Segunda División Profesional.

His last club was Deportes Colina in 2019.

== International career ==
Norambuena was born and raised in Chile to Chilean parents of Palestinian heritage. He made his debut for Palestine in a 2–1 victory versus Yemen on 18 June 2012.

Scores and results list Palestine's goal tally first, score column indicates score after each Norambuena goal.

List of international goals scored by Alexis Norambuena
No.	Date	Venue	Opponent	Score	Result	Competition
1	16 November 2018	Faisal Al-Husseini International Stadium, Al-Ram, Palestine	Pakistan	1–1	2–1	Friendly

== Personal life ==
His maternal great-grandparents were of Palestinian descent. Their last name was Nazar.

== Honours ==
Unión Española

- Primera División de Chile: 2005 Apertura

Jagiellonia Białystok

- Polish Cup: 2009–10
- Polish Super Cup: 2010

GKS Bełchatów

- I liga: 2013–14
