= Roman Maciejak =

Polish footballer

Personal information
- Date of birth: 23 October 1988 (age 38)
- Place of birth: Jelenia Gora, Poland
- Height: 1.83 m (6 ft 0 in)
- Position: Striker

Youth career
- Karkonosze Jelenia Gora
- –2006: UKS SMS Łódź

Senior career*
Years	Team	Apps	(Gls)
2006–2007	Miedź Legnica	2	(0)
2007–2008	Zdrój Ciechocinek	22	(8)
2008–2010	Nielba Wągrowiec	28	(14)
2009–2010	→ Piast Gliwice (loan)	19	(1)
2010–2011	Piast Gliwice	9	(0)
2011	→ Górnik Wałbrzych (loan)	14	(2)
2011–2012	Górnik Wałbrzych	26	(3)
2012–2013	SV Waldhof Mannheim	14	(0)
2013–2014	KS Polkowice	7	(0)
2014	Olimpia Elbląg	14	(2)
2015–2016	Hammer SpVg	35	(3)
2016–2019	FCU Gerersdorf/Ebersdorf	71	(59)
2019–2022	UFC HöZe Mariazell	21	(21)
- * Club domestic league appearances and goals

Roman Maciejak (born 23 October 1988) is a Polish former professional footballer who played as a striker. After scoring 14 goals during the 2007–08 III liga season, he joined Piast Gliwice. There he made 19 appearances in the Ekstraklasa. He also played in Germany and Austria.
