= Paweł Buśkiewicz =

Polish footballer

Personal information
- Full name: Paweł Buśkiewicz
- Date of birth: 18 March 1983 (age 43)
- Place of birth: Ryki, Poland
- Height: 1.88 m (6 ft 2 in)
- Position: Striker

Youth career
- Ruch Ryki

Senior career*
Years	Team	Apps	(Gls)
2002–2003	Polonia Warsaw	12	(0)
2003–2005	Górnik Zabrze	20	(3)
2005	Olympiacos Volos	2	(0)
2005–2006	LASK Linz	12	(1)
2006	Świt Nowy Dwór Mazowiecki	15	(4)
2006–2007	K.S.K. Beveren	13	(0)
2007–2008	Górnik Łęczna	17	(5)
2009	Flota Świnoujście	14	(7)
2009–2010	Korona Kielce	10	(0)
2010	→ GKS Katowice (loan)	8	(2)
2011	Dolcan Ząbki	15	(2)
2011	Olimpia Elbląg	9	(0)

International career
2004	Poland U21	1	(0)
- * Club domestic league appearances and goals

Paweł Buśkiewicz (born 18 March 1983) is a Polish former professional footballer who played as a striker.

== Career ==
=== Club ===
In February 2011, he joined Dolcan Ząbki. He was released from Dolcan Ząbki on 27 June 2011.

In July 2011, he joined Olimpia Elbląg on a one-year contract.

== Honours ==
Górnik Łęczna

- III liga, gr. IV: 2007–08
