= Maciej Mysiak =

Polish footballer

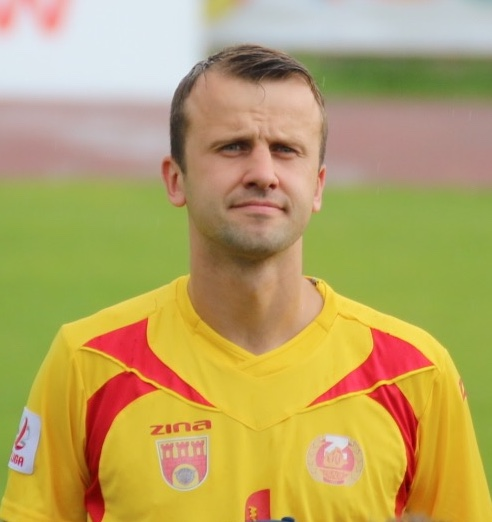
- Mysiak with Znicz Pruszków

Personal information
- Full name: Maciej Mysiak
- Date of birth: 4 February 1984 (age 42)
- Place of birth: Radziszewo, Poland
- Height: 1.90 m (6 ft 3 in)
- Position: Defender

Team information
- Current team: MKS Unia Janikowo (player-manager)

Senior career*
Years	Team	Apps	(Gls)
2002–2003	Energetyk Gryfino		
2003–2004	Wisła Kraków II		
2005–2007	Wisła Kraków	0	(0)
2005	→ GKS Katowice (loan)	7	(0)
2005–2006	→ Lechia Gdańsk (loan)	30	(1)
2006–2007	→ Unia Janikowo (loan)	21	(2)
2007–2009	Unia Janikowo	61	(13)
2009–2010	Pogoń Szczecin	38	(3)
2011–2012	GKS Bełchatów	17	(1)
2012–2013	Warta Poznań	27	(3)
2013–2014	Flota Świnoujście	15	(1)
2014–2015	Limanovia Limanowa	26	(3)
2015–2017	Znicz Pruszków	63	(7)
2017–2018	Elana Toruń	26	(4)
2018–2022	Unia Janikowo	97	(18)
2022–2025	Noteć Gębice	85	(28)
2025–	MKS Unia Janikowo	0	(0)

Managerial career
- 2025–: MKS Unia Janikowo (player-manager)
- * Club domestic league appearances and goals as of 16:50, 24 June 2025 (UTC)

Maciej Mysiak (born 4 February 1984) is a Polish footballer who plays as a defender. He is currently the player-manager of Klasa B club MKS Unia Janikowo.

== Career ==
He used to play in such a teams like Wisła Kraków, GKS Katowice (on loan), Lechia Gdańsk (on loan) and Unia Janikowo (on loan).

In the Summer 2007, he was transferred to Unia Janikowo.

In June 2009, he moved to Pogoń Szczecin.

In January 2011, he joined GKS Bełchatów on a two-and-a-half-year contract.

== Managerial statistics ==
Managerial record by team and tenure
Team	From	To	Record							
Team	From	To	G	W	D	L	GF	GA	GD	Win %
MKS Unia Janikowo (player-manager)	1 July 2025	Present	0	0	0	0	0	0	+0	—
Total			0	0	0	0	0	0	+0	—

== Honours ==
Elana Toruń

- III liga, group II: 2017–18

Unia Janikowo

- IV liga Kuyavia-Pomerania: 2018–19
