= Bartłomiej Chwalibogowski =

Polish footballer (born 1982)

Personal information
- Date of birth: 7 August 1982 (age 44)
- Place of birth: Kraków, Poland
- Height: 1.78 m (5 ft 10 in)
- Position: Winger

Team information
- Current team: Zgoda Byczyna
- Number: 14

Senior career*
Years	Team	Apps	(Gls)
1999–2003	Victoria Jaworzno		
2003–2006	Zagłębie Sosnowiec	72	(6)
2007	GKS Bełchatów	5	(0)
2008	Zagłębie Sosnowiec	8	(0)
2008–2009	GKS Bełchatów	11	(0)
2009–2010	Odra Wodzisław Śląski	15	(0)
2010–2014	GKS Katowice	103	(3)
2014–2015	Unia Ząbkowice		
2016–2017	MKS Myszków		
2017–2018	Victoria Jaworzno		
2018–2019	Niwka Sosnowiec	25	(12)
2019–2021	Szczakowianka Jaworzno	40	(9)
2021	Górnik Mysłowice	6	(2)
2021–2022	Victoria Jaworzno	2	(0)
2022–	Zgoda Byczyna	10	(0)
- * Club domestic league appearances and goals as of 7 August 2024

Bartłomiej Chwalibogowski (born 7 August 1982) is a Polish footballer who plays as a left winger for Zgoda Byczyna.

== Career ==
He joined GKS Bełchatów from Zagłębie Sosnowiec in the winter break of the 2006–07 season. He was one of the best II liga players in the first half of that season.

Chwalibogowski previously played for GKS Bełchatów and Zagłębie Sosnowiec in the Polish Ekstraklasa.

== Honours ==
Victoria Jaworzno

- Klasa A Chrzanów: 2016–17

Szczakowianka Jaworzno

- Regional league Silesia IV: 2019–20
