= El Mehdi Sidqy =

Moroccan footballer (born 1984)

Mido
Personal information
- Full name: El Mehdi Sidqy
- Date of birth: 6 January 1984 (age 42)
- Place of birth: Mohammédia, Morocco
- Height: 1.90 m (6 ft 3 in)
- Position: Defender

Youth career
- SC Chabab de Mohammédia

Senior career*
Years	Team	Apps	(Gls)
2003–2004	Al-Shabab Club		
2004–2005	Bahrain SC		
2005–2007	ES Zarzis		
2008	AS Salé		
2008–2009	Olympic Safi		
2009	Jeunesse Sportive d'El Massira		
2010–2011	Jagiellonia Białystok	13	(0)
2012	Górnik Łęczna	3	(0)
2012–2013	Piast Gliwice	9	(0)
2014	TTM Customs		
2015	Chiangmai		
2016–2017	Lampang		
2019	Senglea Athletic	10	(1)
2019–2021	Victoria Hotspurs		
- * Club domestic league appearances and goals

El Mehdi Sidqy (born 6 January 1984 in Mohammédia) better known as Mido, is a Moroccan former professional footballer who played as a defender.

== Career ==
=== Club ===
In December 2009, he signed a half-year contract with Jagiellonia Białystok.

On 8 January 2019, Mido joined Senglea Athletic in Malta. In August 2019, he moved to Victoria Hotspurs.

== Honours ==
Jagiellonia Białystok

- Polish Cup: 2009–10
