= Piotr Kulpaka =

Polish footballer

Personal information
- Date of birth: 12 September 1984 (age 42)
- Place of birth: Olsztyn, Poland
- Height: 1.84 m (6 ft 1/2 in)
- Position: Defender

Team information
- Current team: Mysen (player-manager)

Youth career
- Stomil Olsztyn

Senior career*
Years	Team	Apps	(Gls)
2003	Czarni Małdyty		
2003	Warmia i Mazury Olsztyn		
2004–2005	Huragan Morąg		
2005–2006	Jeziorak Iława		
2006	Kania Gostyń		
2007–2008	Polonia Warsaw	22	(0)
2009	OKS 1945 Olsztyn	15	(0)
2009–2010	Polonia Bytom	7	(0)
2010–2011	Sandecja Nowy Sącz	5	(0)
2011	Lech Rypin	13	(1)
2011–2013	Polonia Bytom	30	(1)
2013–	Mysen	101	(6)

Managerial career
- 2015–: Mysen (player-manager)
- * Club domestic league appearances and goals as of 2017

Piotr Kulpaka (born 12 September 1984) is a Polish footballer who is player-manager for Mysen IF in Norwegian Fourth Division.

== Notes ==
- Piotr Kulpaka at 90minut.pl (in Polish)
