= Nielba Wągrowiec (football) =

Polish football club

- Full name: Miejski Klub Sportowy; Nielba Wągrowiec
- Founded: 26 April 1925; 100 years ago
- Ground: Stadion im. Stanisława Bąka
- Capacity: 2,600
- Chairman: Zbigniew Stanisławski
- Manager: Patryk Halaburda
- League: IV liga Greater Poland
- 2023–24: IV liga Greater Poland, 6th of 18
- Website: nielba.pl
Home colours	Away colours

Miejski Klub Sportowy Nielba Wągrowiec is a Polish football club based in Wągrowiec. The club currently competes in IV liga Greater Poland.

== Current squad ==
As of 2020–21 season

Goalkeepers: Dawid Kołodziejczak (11.11.95), Patryk Łagodziński (15.09.95, 188/73).
Defenders: Jacek Figaszewski (26.08.83, 180/78), Michał Gruszka (27.09.94, 181/74), Łukasz Iskrzyński (07.02.89, 172/72), Mateusz Kaczor (17.09.94, 180/78), Przemysław Lisiecki (13.03.99), Mikołaj Ortyl (31.03.02), Patryk Soforek (29.06.96), Michał Steinke (19.08.88, 193/85).
Midfielders: Jakub Biegański (05.07.00), Bartłomiej Burman (01.05.01), Tomasz Bzdęga (18.03.85, 185/82), Kacper Friska (20.06.98, 183/70), Jakub Kołak (28.12.01), Adrian Marchel (28.08.97), Mateusz Piechowiak (10.05.97, 182/70), Mateusz Rocławski (18.04.99), Mateusz Rozmarynowski (06.08.00), Mateusz Sporek (12.04.96, 182/65), Krzysztof Wolkiewicz (04.10.91, 171/65).
Forwards: Mikołaj Dobrzykowski (08.07.00), Jakub Kubiński (20.10.99), Rafał Leśniewski (19.12.85, 183/83).

In brackets there are (consecutively): the year of birth, height and weight of the player.

== Honours ==
- II liga
  - Fourth place: 2008–09
- Polish Cup
  - Round of 32: 2009–10
