= Mateusz Wróbel =

Polish handball player (born 1993)

Personal information
- Nationality: Polish
- Born: 7 March 1993 (age 33) Gdynia, Poland
- Height: 1.93 m (6 ft 4 in)

Sport
- Sport: Handball
- Position: Left back
- Current club: Conversano
- Number: 29

Senior clubs
- Years: Team
- 2011–2016: Arka Gdynia
- 2016–2022: Wybrzeże Gdańsk
- 2022-: Conversano
National team
Years	Team	Apps	(Gls)
2017–	Poland	5	(1)

Mateusz Wróbel (born 7 March 1993) is a Polish handball player for Conversano and the Polish national team.
