= Bruno Coutinho (footballer, born 1986) =

Brazilian footballer

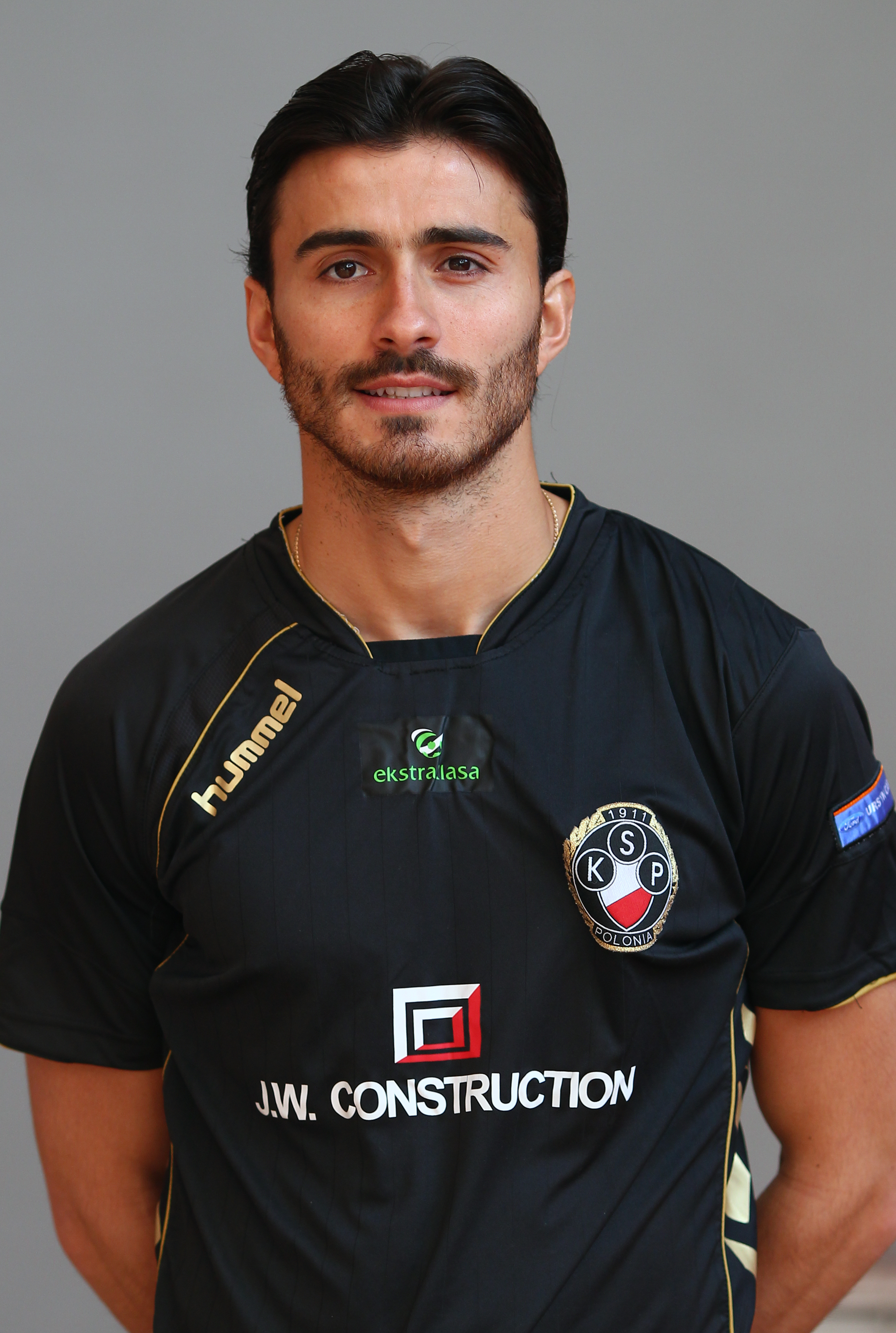
- Bruno Coutinho as a Polonia Warsaw player in 2011

Personal information
- Full name: Bruno Coutinho Martins
- Date of birth: 21 June 1986 (age 40)
- Place of birth: Porto Alegre, Brazil
- Height: 1.84 m (6 ft 1/2 in)
- Position: Attacking midfielder

Youth career
- 2002–2003: Grêmio

Senior career*
Years	Team	Apps	(Gls)
2004–2007	Grêmio	10	(0)
2007	→ América de Natal (loan)		
2007	→ Nacional Montevideo (loan)	2	(0)
2008–2010	Jagiellonia Białystok	47	(2)
2010–2012	Polonia Warsaw	46	(11)
2012	Hapoel Tel Aviv	5	(0)
2013	Astra Giurgiu	0	(0)
2013	Pelotas	0	(0)
2014	Veranópolis	8	(3)
2014	Shenzhen Ruby	15	(1)
2015	Tokyo Verdy	21	(1)

Managerial career
- 2022: Passo Fundo (assistant)
- 2023: Passo Fundo
- 2024: Monte Azul
- 2024: Monsoon
- 2025–2026: Inter de Santa Maria
- * Club domestic league appearances and goals

Bruno Coutinho Martins (born 21 June 1986 in Porto Alegre) is a Brazilian professional football manager and former player who played as an attacking midfielder. He was most recently the head coach of Inter de Santa Maria.

In February 2014, Bruno transferred to China League One side Shenzhen Ruby. He retired at Tokyo Verdy in the J. League Division 2.

In February 2025, he was appointed manager of Inter de Santa Maria.

== Honours ==
Jagiellonia Białystok

- Polish Cup: 2009–10
