= Krzysztof Hrymowicz =

Polish footballer

Personal information
- Date of birth: 29 December 1983 (age 42)
- Place of birth: Złotów, Poland
- Height: 1.90 m (6 ft 3 in)
- Position: Defender

Senior career*
Years	Team	Apps	(Gls)
2003–2006	Darzbór Szczecinek		
2007–2009	Flota Świnoujście		
2009–2011	Pogoń Szczecin	48	(3)
2011–2012	Zawisza Bydgoszcz	23	(0)
2013	Etar 1924	8	(0)
2013–2014	GKS Manowo		
2016	MKP Szczecinek		
2017	Czarni Czarne	10	(0)
2018–2019	MKP Szczecinek		
- * Club domestic league appearances and goals

Krzysztof Hrymowicz (born 29 December 1983) is a Polish former professional footballer who played as a defender.

== Honours ==
Flota Świnoujście

- III liga, group II: 2007–08
