= Ivan Đurđević =

Serbian football manager and former player

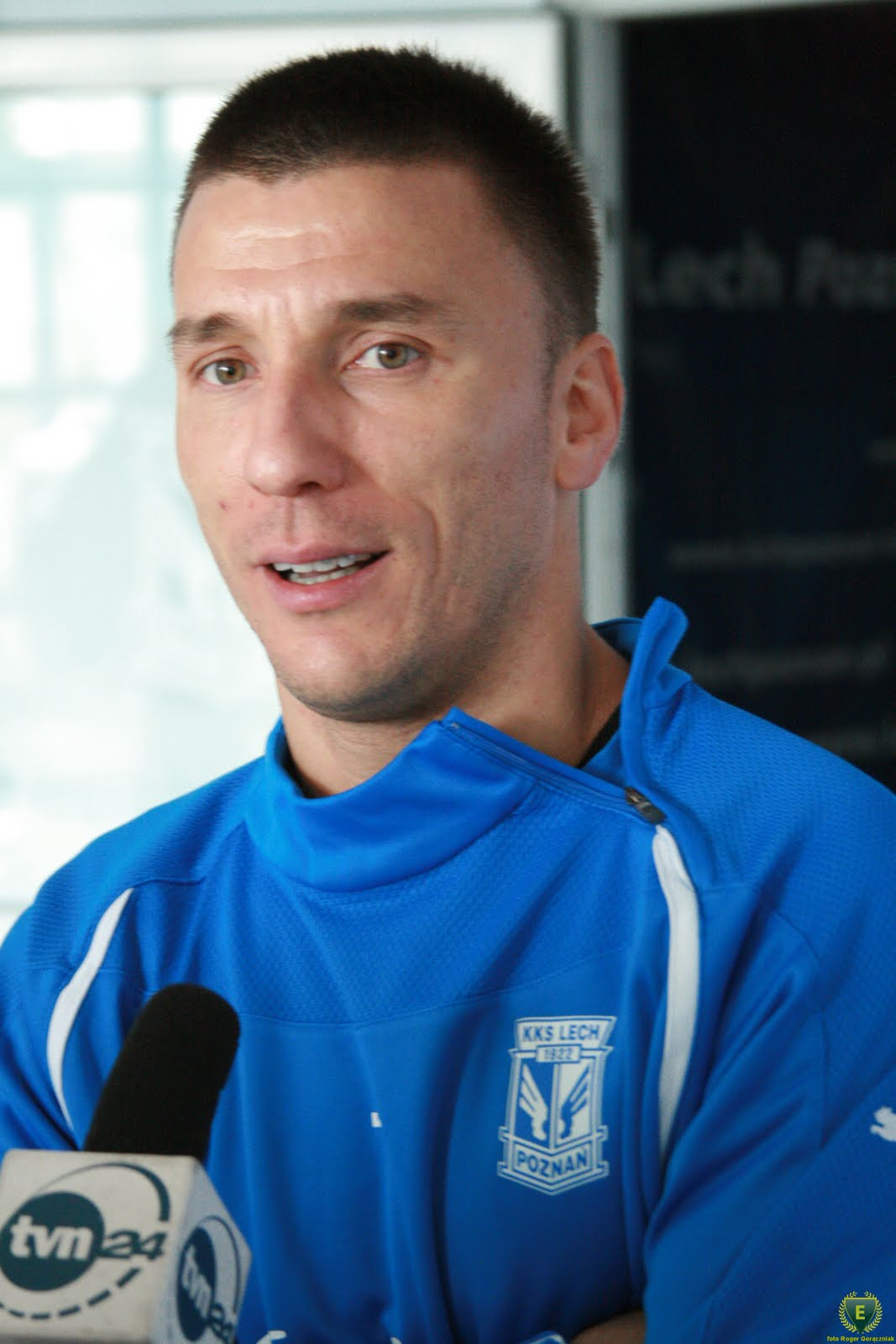
- Đurđević with Lech Poznań in 2010

Personal information
- Date of birth: 5 February 1977 (age 49)
- Place of birth: Belgrade, SFR Yugoslavia
- Height: 1.83 m (6 ft 0 in)
- Positions: Left-back; midfielder

Youth career
- Voždovac
- Red Star Belgrade

Senior career*
Years	Team	Apps	(Gls)
1996	Zvezdara		
1996–1998	Rad	22	(2)
1998–2000	Ourense	72	(4)
2000–2002	Farense	54	(9)
2002–2005	Vitória Guimarães	83	(7)
2005–2007	Belenenses	17	(0)
2007–2013	Lech Poznań	105	(4)
Total		353	(26)

Managerial career
- 2013–2015: Lech Poznań Academy
- 2015–2018: Lech Poznań II
- 2018: Lech Poznań
- 2019–2022: Chrobry Głogów
- 2022–2023: Śląsk Wrocław
- 2025: Stal Mielec
- * Club domestic league appearances and goals

Ivan Đurđević (Serbian Cyrillic: Иван Ђурђевић; also transliterated Djurdjević; born 5 February 1977) is a Serbian football manager and former player who was most recently the manager of I liga club Stal Mielec.

He started his career in his native Belgrade before moving to CD Ourense in Galicia. He then spent many years in the top flight in Portugal before moving to Lech Poznań of Poland, finishing his playing career and moving onto a managerial career with them.

== Playing career ==
Born in Belgrade, Socialist Federal Republic of Yugoslavia, Đurđević made his professional debuts with FK Rad in 1996. In January 1998 he first moved abroad, going on to remain two and a half years in Spain with CD Ourense and competing in both the Segunda División and Segunda División B tournaments.

Đurđević spent most of his 17-year career in Portugal, where he amassed Primeira Liga totals of 154 games and 16 goals with S.C. Farense, Vitória S.C. and C.F. Os Belenenses, and in Poland, spending six consecutive seasons in the Ekstraklasa with Lech Poznań.

== Coaching career ==
After retiring, Đurđević stayed connected to his last club as a youth manager. On 8 May 2015, he was appointed head coach of the reserves in III liga. In May 2018, Đurđević became manager of the senior team. He was dismissed on 4 November 2018.

On 20 May 2019, Đurđević was appointed manager of Chrobry Głogów. On 4 May 2022, with three games to go and Chrobry still in contention for promotion, it was announced he would step down from his role at the end of the season. Chrobry entered the promotion play-offs and caused an upset by eliminating Arka Gdynia on 26 May 2022, only to come up short in the final against Korona Kielce three days later.

On 2 June 2022, Đurđević made his return to Ekstraklasa and was announced as the new manager of Śląsk Wrocław. He was dismissed on 21 April 2023, with six games left in the season.

In August 2024, he joined Latvian Higher League club Liepāja as their new sporting director. Outside of his regular duties, Đurđević was also actively involved in coaching and present on the sidelines during matches. He left the club in December 2024 in order to be closer to his family in Poland.

On 1 April 2025, Đurđević was appointed manager of Ekstraklasa club Stal Mielec, signing a contract until the end of June 2026. Unable to save Stal from relegation to the I liga, Đurđević remained at the club for the start of the following campaign. The team made a poor start to the season, winning just three of their opening eleven league matches of the season. On 27 September, the club announced they had sacked Đurđević.

== Managerial statistics ==
As of match played 27 September 2025

Managerial record by team and tenure
Team	From	To	Record				
Team	From	To	P	W	D	L	Win %
Lech Poznań II	1 July 2015	27 May 2018	108	64	21	23	59.26
Lech Poznań	1 June 2018	4 November 2018	22	9	3	10	40.91
Chrobry Głogów	20 May 2019	1 June 2022	107	40	26	41	37.38
Śląsk Wrocław	2 June 2022	21 April 2023	32	10	10	12	31.25
Stal Mielec	1 April 2025	27 September 2025	20	4	7	9	20.00
Total			289	127	67	95	43.94

== Honours ==
Lech Poznań

- Ekstraklasa: 2009–10
- Polish Cup: 2008–09
- Polish Super Cup: 2009
