= Bartosz Bosacki =

Polish footballer (born 1975)

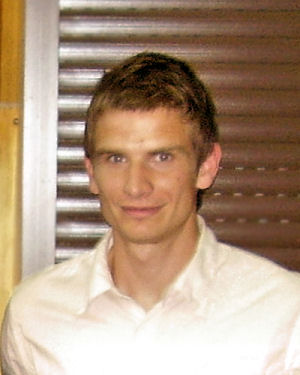
- Bosacki in 2007

Personal information
- Full name: Bartosz Bosacki
- Date of birth: 20 December 1975 (age 50)
- Place of birth: Poznań, Poland
- Height: 1.89 m (6 ft 2 in)
- Position: Centre-back

Youth career
- SKS 13 Poznań

Senior career*
Years	Team	Apps	(Gls)
1995–1998	Lech Poznań	85	(0)
1998–2002	Amica Wronki	95	(2)
2002–2004	Lech Poznań	54	(2)
2004–2005	1. FC Nürnberg	17	(0)
2006–2011	Lech Poznań	118	(6)
Total		369	(10)

International career
2002–2009	Poland	20	(2)
- * Club domestic league appearances and goals

Bartosz Bosacki (born 20 December 1975) is a Polish former professional footballer who played as a centre-back.

== International career ==
On 22 May 2006, Paweł Janas called up Bosacki for the 2006 World Cup as a replacement for Damian Gorawski, after the latter failed medical tests upon being diagnosed with severe asthma. Bosacki scored both goals in Poland's group-stage 2–1 win against Costa Rica on 20 June 2006, which were the only goals scored by the Poland national team during the games. He has been capped 20 times for Poland and scored two goals.

== Career statistics ==
=== International ===
Appearances and goals by national team and year
National team	Year	Apps	Goals
Poland
Poland	2002	1	0
Poland	2004	4	0
Poland	2005	2	0
Poland	2006	6	2
Poland	2008	2	0
Poland	2009	5	0
Total		20	2

Scores and results list Poland's goal tally first, score column indicates score after each Bosacki goal.

List of international goals scored by Bartosz Bosacki
No.	Date	Venue	Opponent	Score	Result	Competition
1	20 June 2006	AWD-Arena, Hanover, Germany	Costa Rica	1–1	2–1	2006 FIFA World Cup
2	20 June 2006	AWD-Arena, Hanover, Germany	Costa Rica	2–1	2–1	2006 FIFA World Cup

== Honours ==
Amica Wronki

- Polish Cup: 1998–99, 1999–2000
- Polish Super Cup: 1998

Lech Poznań

- Ekstraklasa: 2009–10
- Polish Cup: 2003–04, 2008–09
- Polish Super Cup: 2004, 2009

Individual

- Lech Poznań All-time XI
