= Łukasz Janoszka =

Polish footballer

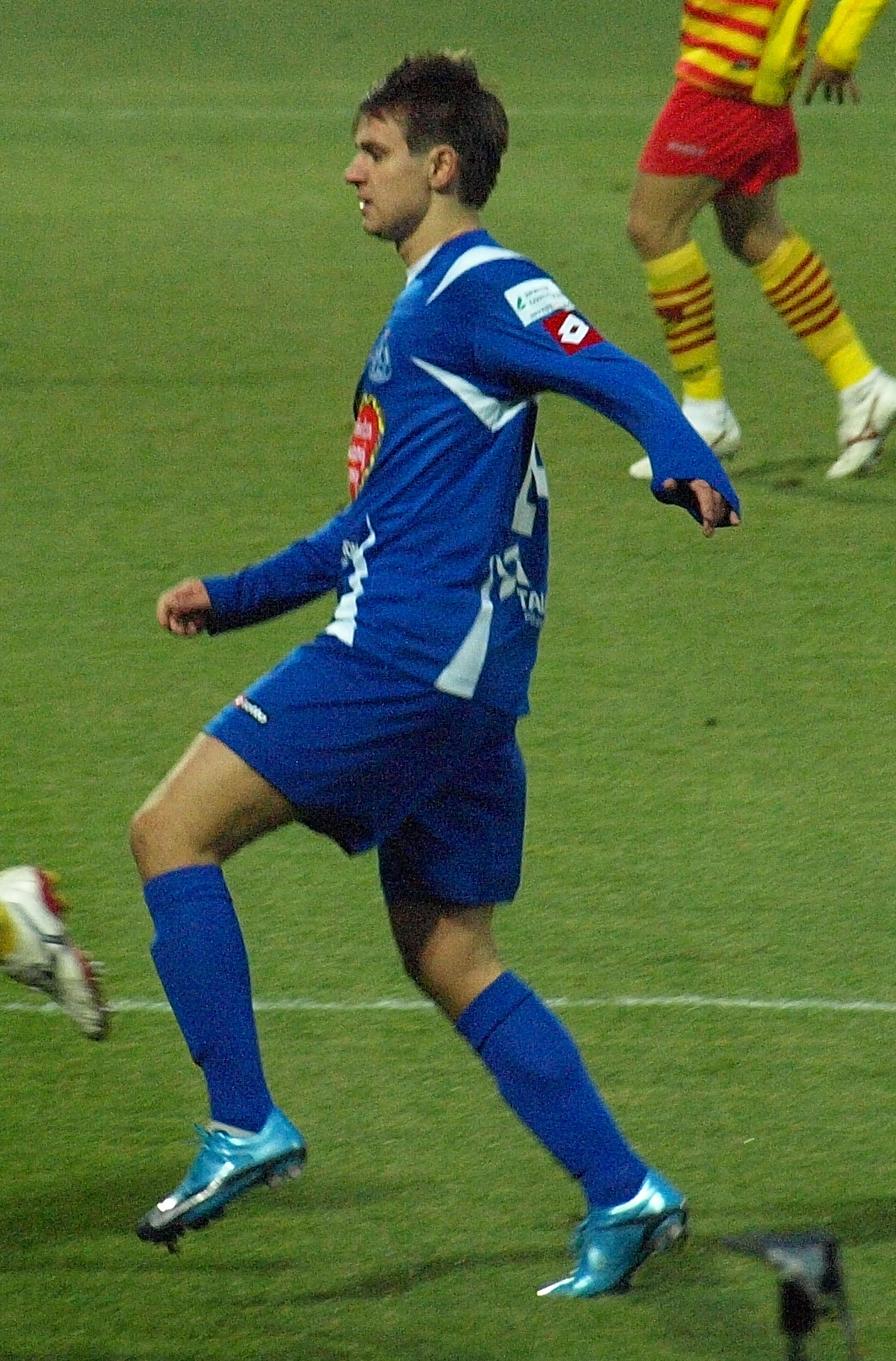

Personal information
- Full name: Łukasz Rafał Janoszka
- Date of birth: 18 March 1987 (age 39)
- Place of birth: Bytom, Poland
- Height: 1.81 m (5 ft 11 in)
- Positions: Winger; forward

Team information
- Current team: AKS Mikołów
- Number: 14

Senior career*
Years	Team	Apps	(Gls)
–2005	Ruch Radzionków		
2005–2013	Ruch Chorzów	182	(28)
2006	→ Walka Makoszowy (loan)		
2008	→ GKS Katowice (loan)	11	(4)
2014–2019	Zagłębie Lubin	125	(17)
2019–2020	Stal Mielec	27	(8)
2020–2023	Ruch Chorzów	97	(18)
2023–	AKS Mikołów	50	(28)

International career
2007	Poland U20	2	(0)
2007–2008	Poland U21	2	(0)
- * Club domestic league appearances and goals as of 10:39, 19 June 2025 (UTC)

Łukasz Rafał Janoszka (born 18 March 1987) is a Polish footballer who plays as a winger or forward for and captains AKS Mikołów. He is the son of former footballer Marian Janoszka.

== Honours ==
Ruch Chorzów

- II liga: 2006–07
- III liga, group III: 2020–21
- Polish Cup (Katowice regionals): 2020–21

Zagłębie Lubin

- I liga: 2014–15

AKS Mikołów

- Regional league Silesia IV: 2023–24

Individual

- Ekstraklasa Player of the Month: April 2010
