= Pyskowice =

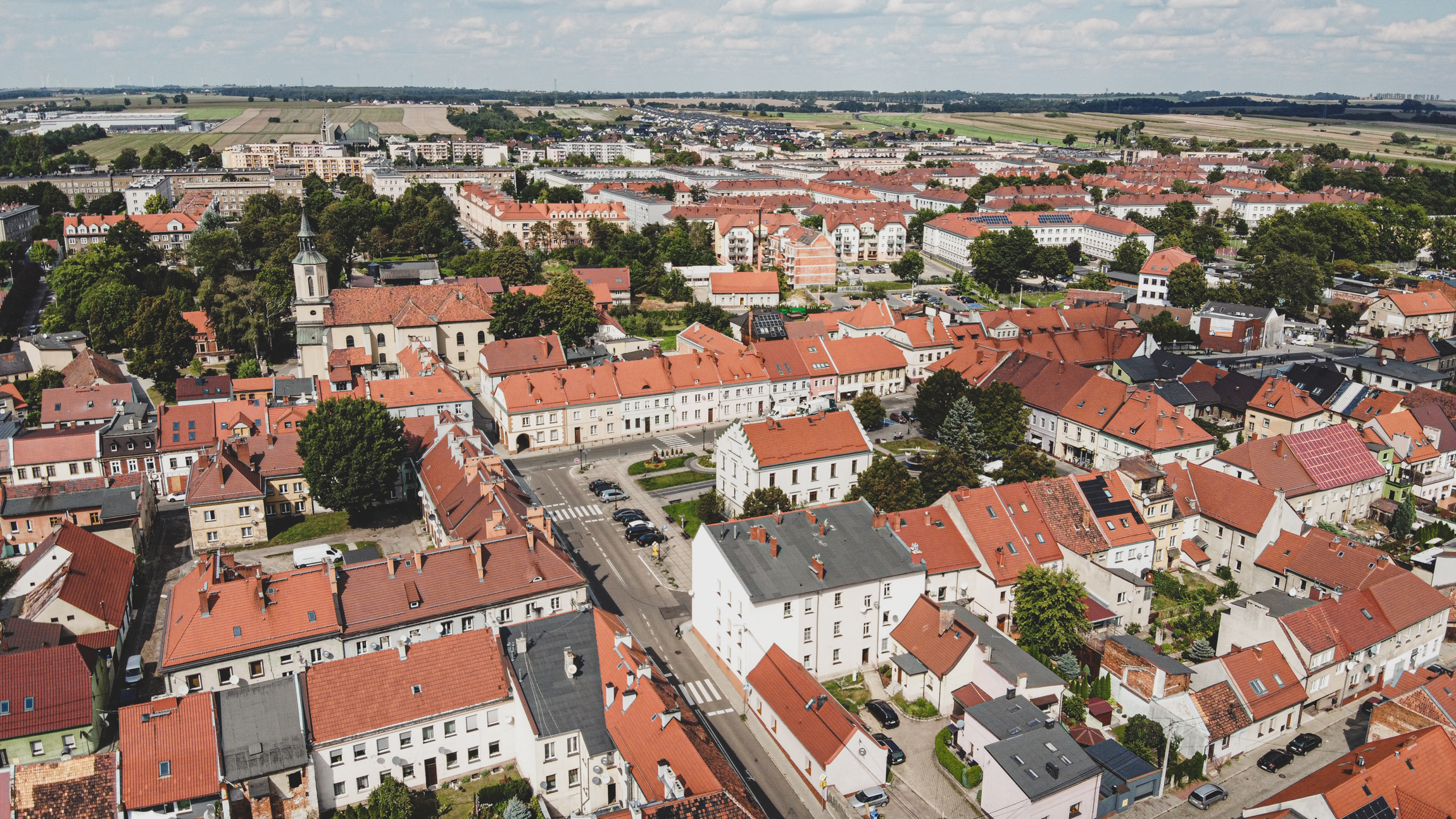
- Aerial view of the town center

- Coat of arms

- Location within Poland
- Coordinates: 50°23′N 18°37′E
- Country: Poland
- Voivodeship: Silesian
- County: Gliwice
- Gmina: Pyskowice (urban gmina)
- First mentioned: 1256

Government
  - Mayor: Adam Wójcik

Area
  - City: 31.89 km^{2} (12.31 sq mi)

Population (2023)
  - City: 16 390
  - Density: 0.50/km^{2} (1.3/sq mi)
  - Urban: 2,746,000
  - Metro: 5,294,000
- Time zone: UTC+1 (CET)
  - Summer (DST): UTC+2 (CEST)
- Postal code: 44-120
- Car plates: SGL
- Climate: Cfb
- Primary airport: Katowice Airport
- Website: https://www.pyskowice.pl/

Pyskowice [pɨskɔˈvʲit͡sɛ] (German: Peiskretscham) is a town in Silesia in southern Poland, near Katowice. Outer town of the Metropolis GZM – metropolis with a population of 2 million. Located in the Silesian Highlands.

It is situated in the Silesian Voivodeship since its formation in 1999, previously it was in Katowice Voivodeship. Pyskowice is one of the towns of the 2.7 million conurbation – Katowice urban area and within a greater Katowice-Ostrava metropolitan area populated by about 5,294,000 people. The population of the town is 18,432 (2019). It borders Gliwice, one of the largest cities of the metropolitan area, in the south.

== History ==
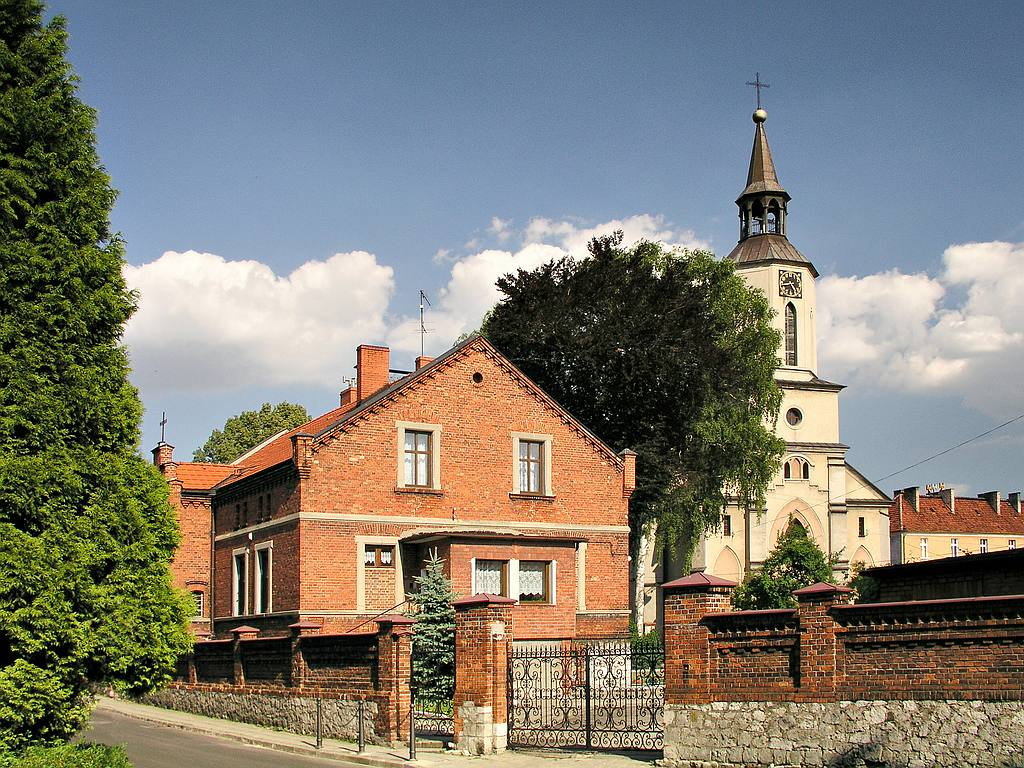
Saint Nicholas Church and the parish house

The name of the town comes from the Old Polish male name Pysk. The oldest known mention of Pyskowice comes from a document of Bishop of Wrocław Tomasz from 1256. It was granted town rights in 1260 by Duke Władysław Opolski. The town was part of fragmented Piast-ruled Poland. It remained part of various Polish-ruled duchies, including Bytom, Cieszyn, Oświęcim and Opole, until 1532 when it was incorporated to the Bohemian (Czech) Crown. In 1645, along with the Duchy of Opole, it came back under Polish rule under the House of Vasa.

It was annexed by Prussia in the 18th century, and from 1871 it was also part of Germany until 1945. In 1842, the town had a population of 3,322, mostly Polish by nationality, and Catholic by confession. Despite Prussian rule, church services were still held mainly in Polish at the time, with German services held only every fourth Sunday. In the 1921 Upper Silesia plebiscite, 73.6% of the residents voted to remain in Germany, while in the present-day district (then separate village) of Dzierżno 67.5% voted to rejoin Poland, which just regained independence following the First World War.

During the Second World War, the Germans established and operated the E578 and E749 forced labour subcamps of the Stalag VIII-B/344 prisoner-of-war camp in the town, and the E110 and E709 subcamps in the present-day district of Dzierżno. Canadian and British prisoners of war had to work there for their German captors. The Germans also operated an additional forced labour camp for Jewish men in 1942–1944. In January 1945, as the Soviet armies resumed their offensive, the prisoners based in Pyskowice were marched westward in the so-called Long March or Death March. Some died from the bitter cold and exhaustion. Eventually the survivors were liberated by American troops in April or May 1945. After the war, the town became again part of Poland under its restored historic name.

In 1984, town limits were expanded by including Mikuszowina as a new district.

== Transport ==
Polish National roads 40 and 94, and the Voivodeship road 901 run through the town, and the A1 and A4 motorways run nearby, within the metropolitan area.

There is a railway station in Pyskowice.

== Culture ==
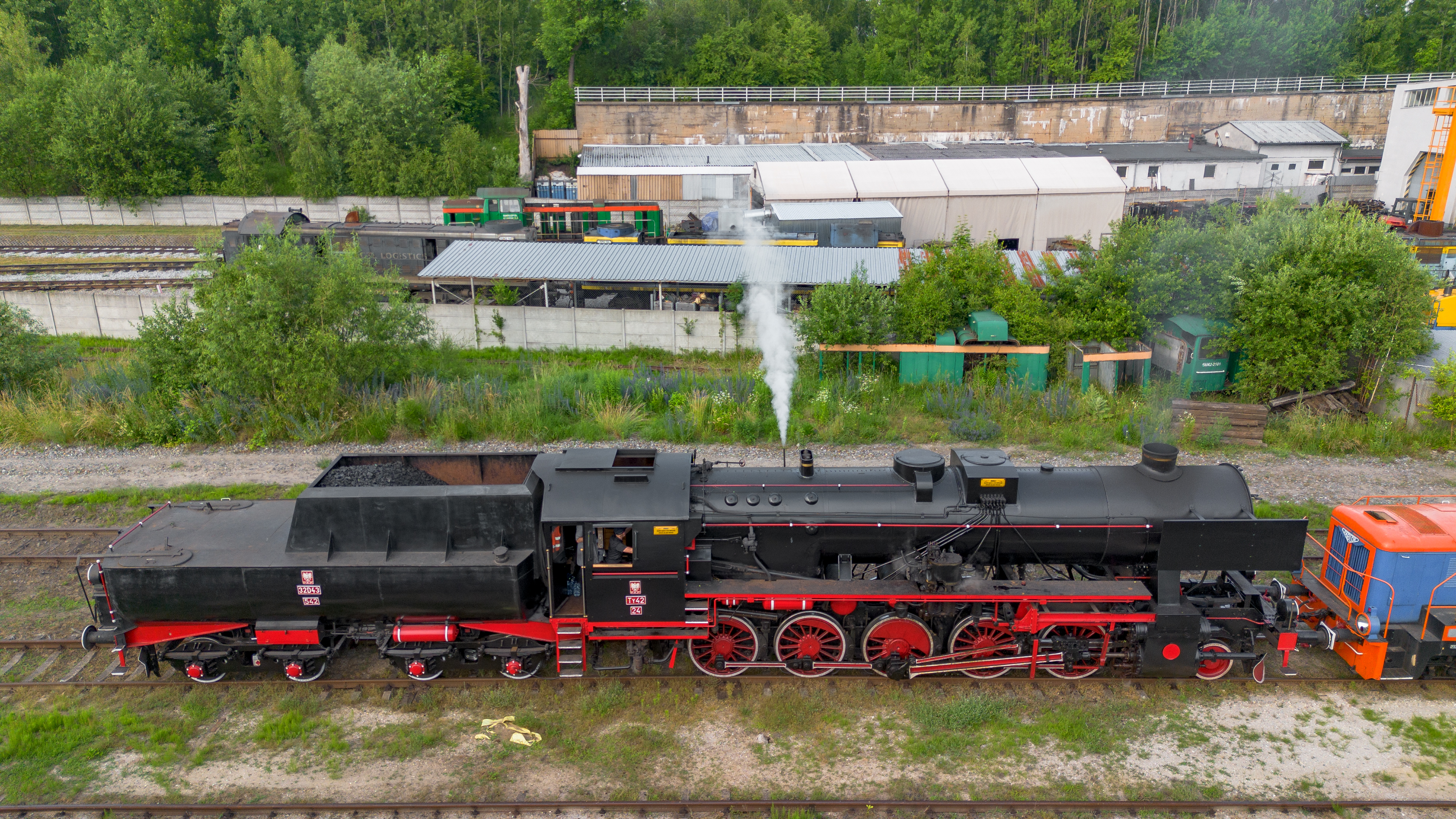
Old Ty42-24 steam locomotive at the railway museum in Pyskowice

There is a railway museum (Skansen Taboru Kolejowego) in Pyskowice.

== Sports ==
The local football club is Czarni Pyskowice. It competes in the lower leagues.

== Notable people ==
- Abraham Lewysohn (1805–1860), rabbi
- Georg Radziej (1895–1972), Wehrmacht general
- Agata Buzek (born 1976), actress
- C-BooL (born 1981), DJ and record producer
- Rafał Szombierski (born 1982), speedway rider
- Grzegorz Kasprzik (born 1983), footballer

== Twin towns – sister cities ==
Pyskowice is twinned with:

- Flörsheim am Main, Germany
- La Ricamarie, France
- Sheptytskyi, Ukraine
