= Ząbkovia Ząbki =

- Full name: Miejski Klub Sportowy Ząbkovia Ząbki
- Founded: 1927; 99 years ago
- Ground: Municipal Stadium in Ząbki
- Capacity: 2,100
- Chairman: Jerzy Szczęsny
- Manager: Michał Maliszewski
- League: III liga, group I
- 2025–26: III liga, group I, 10th of 18
- Website: http://www.zabkovia1927.pl/
Home colours	Away colours

Ząbkovia Ząbki (Polish pronunciation: [zɔmpˈkɔvja ˈzɔmpkʲi]) is a Polish professional football club, based in Ząbki, Masovian Voivodeship. The club's colors are red, white, and blue. Its biggest successes were achieved when the club was called Dolcan Ząbki [ˈdɔlkan], between 1994 and 2018.

They currently compete in the fourth tier, after winning the IV liga promotion play-offs in 2025.

== Achievements ==
- 9 seasons at the second tier of Polish association football - including a 3rd place in 2013–14 and a 6th place in 2014–15,
- Reaching the 8th-finals of the Polish Cup − 2009,
- Regional level champions of the Polish Cup − 1994.

== History ==
The exact date on which the club was established is unknown. However, documents confirm that the club did exist in 1927. Its initial name was Ząbkovia. In the beginning, the club had only a football section, while athletics and table tennis ones were launched in the 1930s. The club functioned until 1939 and was reactivated in 1945, following World War II. Afterwards, the club's name was changed multiple times: to Związkowiec, Budowlani, Beton-Stal, then back to Ząbkovia before finally adopting Dolcan in March 1994. In 2018, they reverted to Ząbkovia due to the Dolcan company going bankrupt the year prior.

=== League history ===
Following World War II, the club took part in mostly lower-level league competitions.

In 1995, the club took part in the III liga competition, the third division at the time. The following year, having won the Warsaw group of the third-tier league, Dolcan was promoted to the second division for the first time. However, the team only managed to finish 17th out of 18 teams in the 1996–97 eastern group of the II liga and was relegated back to the third tier after one season.

Back at the third tier, the club was consistently achieving good results. The club finished third in 1997–98, second in 1998–99, before claiming the first place in 1999–2000 and being promoted to the second flight for the second time.

By that time, the number of teams in the second division was reduced to 20. Dolcan did not perform well against the second-tier teams and finished last being relegated to the third division after one season once again. The following year, Dolcan dropped to the fourth tier.

After two successive relegations, the club spent three seasons at the fourth tier. While Dolcan was promoted in 2005, the following season ended in defeat - last place and another relegation to the IV liga.

This time, however, the club's fourth-tier tenure was short-lived. After managing to achieve two successive promotions, Dolcan joining the second tier of Polish association football, renamed in the meantime to the second tier, for the third time.

In the 2008–09 season, the club was ranked 8th at the second tier. The three following seasons were not as successful, though Dolcan managed to avoid relegation by finishing 14th, 13th and 14th. However, in 2012–13, Dolcan was 7th, far off the relegation zone. In 2013–14, although Dolcan scored just one point more than the previous season, it was enough to finish in third place, the club's best result so far. Next season, the seventh consecutive at the second tier, Dolcan was 6th.

Dolcan started the following 2015–16 season in the second division. However, during the winter break problems of a financial nature started to surface. Following the bankruptcy of SK Bank which held the majority of financial assets belonging to the club's main sponsor - Dolcan, resulting in the accumulation of debt towards the players, coaching staff, and tax institutions, the club was withdrawn from the second division. The club was ranked 6th at the time, having played 19 out of the 34 scheduled matches.

Following the withdrawal, Dolcan joined one of the Warsaw groups of the IV liga, the fifth tier of association football. In 2016–17, the club finished 12th, avoiding further relegation by just one point.

In 2021, Ząbkovia finished 1st in the Warsaw group of the Mazovian IV liga but finished second in the promotion playoff, three points behind Pilica Białobrzegi and failed to secure promotion to the III liga.

=== In the Polish Cup ===
The club's most notable result in the Polish Cup was achieved during the 2009–10 season. In the fall of 2009, Dolcan joined the competition by eliminating a lower-tier team, Ruch Zdzieszowice, in the first round 3–0. In the round of 32, the club managed to eliminate Śląsk Wrocław, a top-tier team, winning in a penalty shootout after the match ended in a 1–1 draw. However, in the following round, Dolcan lost against Korona Kielce in extra time.

== Current squad ==
As of 31 May 2018
Note: Flags indicate national team as defined under FIFA eligibility rules; some limited exceptions apply. Players may hold more than one non-FIFA nationality.

No.	Pos.	Nation	Player
1	GK	POL	Jacek Kozaczyński
2	MF	POL	Przemysław Więczek
3	DF	POL	Maciej Ofmański
4	DF	POL	Grzegorz Krystosiak
5	MF	UKR	Andrii Rohozin
6	MF	POL	Paweł Nowacki
7	MF	POL	Mateusz Jaroszewski
8	DF	POL	Adrian Żukiewicz
12	GK	POL	Damian Krzyżewski
13	DF	POL	Krystian Świderski

No.	Pos.	Nation	Player
14	MF	POL	Krystian Lewandowski
16	FW	POL	Patryk Szeliga
17	DF	POL	Bartosz Wybraniec
18	DF	POL	Dariusz Dadacz
19	FW	POL	Paweł Barzyc
20	FW	POL	Łukasz Zaniewski
21	MF	POL	Piotr Augustyniak
24	DF	POL	Przemysław Szulakowski
27	MF	POL	Patryk Kozierkiewicz

== Notable players ==
The following Dolcan players had international caps for Poland. Only Rafał Leszczyński represented Poland while playing for Dolcan. The years they played in Ząbki are given in parentheses.

- (Poland) Jan Karaś (1994–1996)
- (Poland) Kazimierz Buda (1997–2000)
- (Poland) Artur Boruc (2000)
- (Poland) Tomasz Cebula (2000–2001)
- (Poland) Artur Jędrzejczyk (2008–2009)
- (Poland) Rafał Leszczyński (2009-2015)
- (Poland) Tomasz Ciesielski (2010–2012)
