= 2009–10 Ekstraklasa =

84th season of top-tier football league in Poland

Ekstraklasa
- Season: 2009–10
- Dates: 31 July 2009 – 15 May 2010
- Champions: Lech Poznań (6th title)
- Relegated: Piast Gliwice; Odra Wodzisław
- Champions League: Lech Poznań
- Europa League: Wisła Kraków; Ruch Chorzów; Jagiellonia Białystok (via Polish Cup)
- Matches: 240
- Goals: 532 (2.22 per match)
- Top goalscorer: Robert Lewandowski (18 goals)
- Biggest home win: Legia 4–0 Zagłębie (2 August 2009); Korona 4–0 Polonia W. (2 August 2009); Polonia B. 4–0 Piast (11 September 2009); Śląsk 4–0 Odra (21 November 2009)
- Biggest away win: Korona 0–5 Lech (9 August 2009)
- Highest scoring: Cracovia 2–6 Lechia (7 August 2009)
- Highest attendance: 15,500; Korona 0–5 Lech (9 August 2009)
- Total attendance: 1,256,003
- Average attendance: 5,247 ▼28.6%

The 2009–10 Ekstraklasa was the 84th season of the Polish Football Championship, the 76th season of the highest tier domestic division in the Polish football league system since its establishment in 1927 and the 2nd season of the Ekstraklasa under its current title. The league is operated by the Ekstraklasa S.A.

The season was played as a round-robin tournament. It began on 31 July 2009 and concluded on 15 May 2010. The champions were Lech Poznań.

== Teams ==
Due to several non-competitive events between last and this season, the team exchange among the two highest football divisions of Poland was only partially determined by the 2008–09 league tables.

ŁKS Łódź were denied a license by the Polish FA because of financial issues. ŁKS filed several appeals against this decision, but were eventually left without any success.

First League 2008–09 champions Widzew Łódź were not permitted to advance by the Polish FA after their involvement in the Polish corruption scandal. The club had its initial appeals rejected, however, an Arbitration Tribunal later returned a verdict in the club's favor which led the club to file a request for immediate reinstatement to the Ekstraklasa.

The decisions had a significant influence on the relegation and promotion of teams. As a consequence of their revoked license, ŁKS were put in last place of the 2008–09 Ekstraklasa standings and directly relegated to the First League. They were joined by Górnik Zabrze as 15th-placed team. Both teams were replaced with First League 2008–09 runners-up Zagłębie Lubin and third-placed Korona Kielce.

Because of the controversy surrounding both teams from Łódź, the Polish FA was forced to postpone the originally planned relegation/promotion play-off in June 2009 and eventually decided to cancel it completely.

== Stadiums and locations ==
Location of teams in 2009–10 Ekstraklasa
Location of teams in the Katowice urban area

Team	Location	Venue	Capacity
Arka Gdynia	Gdynia	Stadion Miejski	12,000 (upgrading 15,500)
Cracovia	Kraków	Stadion Cracovii	12,000 (upgrading 15,100)
GKS Bełchatów	Bełchatów	Stadion GKS	5,264
Jagiellonia Białystok	Białystok	Stadion Miejski	7,500 (upgrading 22,500)
Korona Kielce	Kielce	Stadion Miejski	15,550
Lech Poznań	Poznań	Stadion Lecha	24,166 (upgrading 45,830)
Lechia Gdańsk	Gdańsk	Stadion Lechii	11,811
Legia Warsaw	Warsaw	Stadion Wojska Polskiego	25,976 (upgrading 33,200)
Odra Wodzisław Śląski	Wodzisław Śląski	Stadion Miejski	7,400
Piast Gliwice	Gliwice	Stadion Piasta	5,000
Polonia Bytom	Bytom	Stadion Edwarda Szymkowiaka	6,000
Polonia Warsaw	Warsaw	Stadion Polonii	7,150
Ruch Chorzów	Chorzów	Stadion Ruchu	9,300
Śląsk Wrocław	Wrocław	Stadion Oporowska	8,273
Wisła Kraków	Kraków	Stadion Henryka Reymana	20,346 (upgrading 33,680)
Zagłębie Lubin	Lubin	Stadion Miejski	16,300

== League table ==
Pos	Team	Pld	W	D	L	GF	GA	GD	Pts	Qualification or relegation
1	Lech Poznań (C)	30	19	8	3	51	20	+31	65	Qualification to Champions League second qualifying round
2	Wisła Kraków	30	19	5	6	48	20	+28	62	Qualification to Europa League second qualifying round
3	Ruch Chorzów	30	16	5	9	40	30	+10	53	Qualification to Europa League first qualifying round
4	Legia Warsaw	30	15	7	8	36	22	+14	52	
5	GKS Bełchatów	30	13	9	8	37	27	+10	48	
6	Korona Kielce	30	9	10	11	35	41	−6	37 (Note: KOR: 7 pts, 3–2; PBY: 5 pts, 2–2; LGD: 3 pts, 2–3)	
7	Polonia Bytom	30	9	10	11	29	31	−2	37	
8	Lechia Gdańsk	30	9	10	11	30	32	−2	37	
9	Śląsk Wrocław	30	8	12	10	32	33	−1	36	
10	Zagłębie Lubin	30	8	11	11	30	38	−8	35	
11	Jagiellonia Białystok (Note: Jagiellonia Białystok were docked ten points at the start of the 2009–10 season as a consequence of the club's involvement in a corruption scandal.)	30	11	11	8	29	27	+2	34 (Note: JAG 0–0 CRA; CRA 0–1 JAG)	Qualification to Europa League third qualifying round (Note: Jagiellonia Białystok qualified for the Europa League as 2009-10 Polish Cup winners.)
12	Cracovia	30	9	7	14	25	39	−14	34	
13	Polonia Warsaw	30	9	6	15	25	38	−13	33	
14	Arka Gdynia	30	7	7	16	28	39	−11	28	
15	Odra Wodzisław (R)	30	7	6	17	27	45	−18	27 (Note: ODR 2–0 PIA; PIA 2–1 ODR)	Relegation to I liga
16	Piast Gliwice (R)	30	7	6	17	30	50	−20	27	Relegation to I liga

Source: 90minut.pl (in Polish)
Rules for classification: 1st points; 2nd head-to-head points; 3rd head-to-head goal difference; 4th head-to-head goals scored; 5th head-to-head away goals scored; 6th goal difference; 7th goals scored
(C) Champions; (R) Relegated

== Results ==
Home \ Away	ARK	CRA	BEŁ	KOR	JAG	LPO	LGD	LEG	ODR	PIA	PBY	PWA	RUC	ŚLĄ	WIS	ZLU
Arka Gdynia		2–0	2–1	1–2	0–0	1–1	1–2	0–1	2–0	2–1	2–2	0–0	0–3	1–1	0–1	0–2
Cracovia	1–1		0–1	3–0	0–1	1–0	2–6	1–2	1–0	3–2	1–2	1–2	1–4	1–0	1–1	1–1
GKS Bełchatów	1–0	3–0		1–0	1–1	1–1	2–1	0–1	3–0	0–1	2–2	3–0	2–1	2–0	1–0	1–3
Korona Kielce	1–2	1–1	1–1		1–0	0–5	1–0	0–1	1–1	3–2	1–0	4–0	3–0	1–1	2–3	3–3
Jagiellonia Białystok	2–1	0–0	2–1	2–0		2–3	0–0	2–0	2–1	2–0	0–0	1–0	1–0	2–0	0–0	0–0
Lech Poznań	2–0	3–1	2–2	2–0	2–0		2–1	1–0	1–0	1–1	3–0	2–4	3–1	1–0	1–0	2–0
Lechia Gdańsk	2–1	1–0	0–2	1–1	2–0	0–0		2–3	0–2	0–1	0–0	1–1	1–1	1–1	0–1	1–0
Legia Warsaw	1–0	0–0	2–2	5–2	2–1	2–0	2–0		0–1	3–0	1–0	1–1	2–0	1–1	0–3	4–0
Odra Wodzisław	2–1	1–0	0–1	0–2	2–2	0–0	0–0	1–0		2–0	0–1	2–1	1–3	2–4	1–3	1–2
Piast Gliwice	2–2	0–1	1–2	1–0	0–0	1–3	0–2	1–1	2–1		1–0	0–2	1–2	2–2	1–4	4–1
Polonia Bytom	3–1	1–2	1–0	1–0	1–1	1–1	1–1	1–0	1–1	4–0		1–0	0–1	0–0	1–3	2–1
Polonia Warsaw	2–1	0–1	0–0	1–1	2–0	0–3	0–1	1–0	2–1	0–2	1–0		1–1	3–2	0–1	0–1
Ruch Chorzów	1–0	2–0	1–0	0–0	5–2	1–2	1–0	1–0	3–2	2–0	2–1	2–0		0–0	1–3	0–2
Śląsk Wrocław	2–1	2–0	0–0	1–1	1–2	0–3	1–2	0–0	4–0	2–1	2–1	1–0	0–0		1–3	2–0
Wisła Kraków	0–1	0–1	3–0	0–1	2–1	0–0	3–0	0–1	1–1	2–1	1–1	2–1	2–0	1–0		1–0
Zagłębie Lubin	0–2	0–0	1–1	2–2	0–0	0–1	2–2	0–0	2–1	1–1	2–0	2–0	0–1	1–1	1–4	

Source: 90minut.pl (in Polish)
Legend: Blue = home team win; Yellow = draw; Red = away team win.

== Player statistics ==
=== Top goalscorers ===
Rank	Player	Club	Goals
1	(Poland) Robert Lewandowski	Lech Poznań	18
2	(Bulgaria) Iliyan Mitsanski	Zagłębie Lubin	14
3	(Poland) Tomasz Frankowski	Jagiellonia Białystok	11
4	(Poland) Artur Sobiech	Ruch Chorzów	10
4	(Poland) Paweł Brożek	Wisła Kraków	10
6	(Poland) Dawid Nowak	GKS Bełchatów	9
6	(Serbia) Vuk Sotirović	Śląsk Wrocław	9
8	(Poland) Łukasz Janoszka	Ruch Chorzów	8
8	(Poland) Sławomir Peszko	Lech Poznań	8
8	(Poland) Patryk Małecki	Wisła Kraków	8

== Season statistics ==
Including matches played on 9 April 2010; Source: 90minut.pl

=== Scoring ===
- First goal of the season: Arkadiusz Głowacki (Wisła Kraków) Match: 2-0 Ruch Chorzów, 20th minute (1 August 2009)
- Fastest goal in a match: Marcelo (Wisła Kraków) Match: 4-1 Zagłębie Lubin, 1st minute (7 August 2009)
- First hat-trick of the season: Adrian Paluchowski (Legia Warsaw) Match: 4-0 Zagłębie Lubin, 32', 48', 62'.(2 August 2009);
- Fastest hat-trick of the season: Adrian Paluchowski (Legia Warsaw) Match: 4-0 Zagłębie Lubin, 32', 48', 62', 30 minutes. (2 August 2009)
- Most goals scored by a player in one game: Adrian Paluchowski (Legia Warsaw) Match: 4-0 Zagłębie Lubin, 32', 48', 62', 3 goals.(2 August 2009);
- Widest winning margin: Lech Poznań Match: 5-0 Korona Kielce, 5 goals. (9 August 2009)
- Most goals in a match: Lechia Gdańsk Match: 6-2 Cracovia, 8 goals.(7 August 2009)

== Awards ==
=== Monthly awards ===
==== Player of the Month ====
Month	Player	Club
August 2009	(Poland) Sławomir Peszko	Lech Poznań
September 2009	(Poland) Kamil Grosicki	Jagiellonia Białystok
October 2009	(Poland) Grzegorz Sandomierski	Jagiellonia Białystok
November 2009	(Slovakia) Ján Mucha	Legia Warsaw
December 2009	(Brazil) Marcelo	Wisła Kraków
March 2010	(Bulgaria) Iliyan Mitsanski	Zagłębie Lubin
April 2010	(Poland) Łukasz Janoszka	Ruch Chorzów

=== Annual awards ===
Award	Player	Club
Player of the Season	(Poland) Robert Lewandowski	Lech Poznań
Discovery of the Season	(Poland) Artur Sobiech	Ruch Chorzów
Fair Play Award	Polonia Bytom	

== Attendances ==
No.	Club	Average	Highest
1	Korona Kielce	10,182	15,500
2	Lechia Gdańsk	8,748	12,500
3	Ruch Chorzów	8,153	10,500
4	Zagłębie Lubin	7,962	10,215
5	Lech Poznań	7,727	13,500
6	Śląsk Wrocław	6,107	8,500
7	Jagiellonia Białystok	5,148	6,000
8	Polonia Bytom	5,047	8,000
9	Arka Gdynia	3,947	7,500
10	Odra Wodzisław Śląski	3,871	6,000
11	Legia Warszawa	3,233	5,000
12	Bełchatów	3,187	5,500
13	Polonia Warszawa	2,993	5,500
14	Piast Gliwice	2,967	4,500
15	Wisła Kraków	2,940	6,000
16	Cracovia	1,743	5,000

== See also ==
- 2009–10 Polish Cup
