= List of people with given name Piotr =

Polish masculine given name

Piotr is a Polish given name that is equivalent to the English name, Peter. In 2009, Piotr was one of the three most popular male names in Poland.

== Given name only ==
- Piotr I (bishop of Wrocław) (died 1111), Polish Catholic priest
- Piotr I Półkozic (died c. 1239), bishop of Płock
- Piotr of Bogoria and Skotnik (died 1283), Polish nobleman
- Piotr of Goniądz (c. 1525–1573), Polish political and religious writer
- Piotr of Grudziądz (1392–c. 1480), Polish medieval composer
- Piotr of Klecia (born c. 1329), Polish knight and courtier

== A ==
- Piotr Abramowicz (1619–1697), Polish Jesuit
- Piotr Abraszewski (1905–1996), Polish painter
- Piotr Adamczyk (born 1972), Polish actor
- Piotr Alberti (1913–1994), Soviet and Russian painter
- Piotr Albiński (born 1969), Polish freestyle swimmer
- Piotr Anderszewski (born 1969), Polish pianist and composer
- Piotr Andrejew (1947–2017), Polish film director and screenwriter
- Piotr Azikiewicz (born 1995), Polish professional footballer

== B ==
- Piotr Bagnicki (born 1980), Polish footballer
- Piotr Bajdziak (born 1984), Polish footballer
- Piotr Bajor (born 1960), Polish film actor
- Piotr Bajtlik (born 1982), Polish actor and voiceover talent
- Piotr Balcerowicz (fl. 1990s–2010s), Polish orientalist, philosopher, professor
- Piotr Balcerzak (born 1975), Polish sprint athlete
- Piotr Banasiak (born 1987), Polish association football goalkeeper
- Piotr Banaszak (born 1964), Polish Olympic weightlifter
- Piotr Bania (born 1973), Polish football player
- Piotr Baryka (1600–1675), Polish soldier and writer
- Piotr Basta (born 1970), Polish rower
- Piotr Bazler (born 1981), Polish footballer
- Piotr Bańka (born 1964), Polish doctor and politician
- Piotr Beczała (born 1966), Polish operatic tenor
- Piotr Belousov (1912–1989), Soviet and Russian painter
- Piotr Bielak (born 1976), Polish footballer
- Piotr Bielczyk (born 1952), Polish javelin thrower
- Piotr Bieliński (born 1948), Swiss-born Polish Mediterranean archaeologist
- Piotr Ignacy Bieńkowski (1865–1925), Polish classical scholar and archaeologist
- Piotr Biesiekirski (born 2001), Polish motorcycle racer
- Piotr Bikont (1955–2017), Polish journalist, publicist, culinary critic and theatre director
- Piotr Bobras (born 1977), Polish chess grandmaster
- Piotr Bochenek (born 1975), Polish rower
- Piotr Bojańczyk (born 1946), Polish ice dancer
- Piotr Borodin (1905–1986), Soviet politician
- Piotr Borys (born 1976), Polish politician
- Piotr Brol (1944–2001), Polish footballer
- Piotr Bronowicki (born 1981), Polish footballer
- Piotr Brożek (born 1983), Polish footballer
- Piotr Brożyna (born 1995), Polish racing cyclist
- Piotr Bruzda (1946–1997), Polish speedway rider
- Piotr Bryhadzin (1949–2021), Belarusian historian and politician
- Piotr Brzoza (born 1966), Polish footballer
- Piotr Brzózka (born 1989), Polish cross-country mountain biker
- Piotr Buchalski (born 1981), Polish rower
- Piotr Buchkin (1886–1965), Soviet and Russian painter
- Piotr Buciarski (born 1975), Danish pole vaulter
- Piotr Bujnarowski (born 1972), Polish rower
- Piotr Bujnowicz (born 1973), Polish photographer
- Piotr Bukowski (born 1963), German water polo player
- Piotr Burlikowski (born 1970), Polish footballer

== C ==
- Piotr Całbecki (born 1967), Polish politician
- Piotr Celeban (born 1985), Polish footballer
- Piotr Cetnarowicz (born 1973), Polish footballer
- Piotr Chernyshev (1712–1773), Russian Imperial nobleman
- Piotr Chmielewski (born 1970), Polish racing cyclist
- Piotr Chmielowski (1848–1904), Polish philosopher, literary historian and critic
- Piotr Choynowski (1885–1935), Polish writer, novelist and translator
- Piotr Chrapkowski (born 1988), Polish handball player
- Piotr Chvertko (1915–?), Soviet politician and intelligence officer
- Piotr Cieśla (born 1955), Polish handball player
- Piotr Cugowski (born 1979), Polish musician
- Piotr Ćwielong (born 1986), Polish footballer
- Piotr Cybulski (born 1955), Polish politician
- Piotr Cywiński (born 1972), director of the Auschwitz-Birkenau State Museum
- Piotr Czachowski (born 1966), Polish footballer
- Piotr Czaczka (born 1958), Polish handball player
- Piotr Czaja (born 1944), Polish footballer
- Piotr Michał Czartoryski (1909–1993), Polish nobleman
- Piotr Czauderna (born 1962), Polish government official
- Piotr Czech (born 1986), Polish gridiron football player
- Piotr Czerkawski (born 1989), Polish film critic
- Piotr Czerniawski (born 1976), Polish poet

== D ==
- Piotr Damasiewicz (born 1980), Polish composer
- Piotr Danielak (1913–1969), Polish footballer
- Piotr Daniluk (born 1982), Polish sports shooter
- Piotr Edward Dankowski (1908–1942), Polish Catholic saint
- Piotr Darmochwał (born 1991), Polish footballer
- Piotr Domaradzki (1946–2015), Polish-born American journalist, essayist and historian
- Piotr Dominiak (born 1948), Polish economist and professor
- Piotr Drzewiecki (multiple people)
- Piotr Dumała (born 1956), Polish film director and animator
- Piotr Dunin (c. 1415–1484), leader in the Kingdom of Poland
- Piotr Dziewicki (born 1979), Polish footballer
- Piotr Dłucik (born 1954), Polish swimmer
- Piotr Długosielski (born 1977), Polish sprinter

== E ==
- Piotr Eberhardt (1935–2020), Polish geographer and professor

== F ==
- Piotr Farfał (born 1978), Polish rightwing politician
- Piotr Fast (born 1951), Polish professor and historian of Russian literature
- Piotr Feliks (1883–1941), Polish political, social and education activist
- Piotr Fijas (born 1958), Polish ski jumper
- Piotr Firlej (died 1553), Polish nobleman
- Piotr Florczyk (born 1978), Polish poet, translator, essayist, and critic
- Piotr Fronczewski (born 1946), Polish actor and singer

== G ==
- Piotr Gabrych (born 1972), Polish volleyball player
- Piotr Gacek (born 1978), Polish volleyball player
- Piotr Gadzinowski (born 1957), Polish leftist politician
- Piotr Gajewski (born 1959), Polish politician, artistic director, and conductor
- Piotr Gamrat (1487–1545), Polish archbishop
- Piotr Gąsowski (born 1964), Polish actor, comedian, and presenter
- Piotr Gawroński (born 1990), Polish racing cyclist
- Piotr Gawryś (born 1955), Swiss bridge player
- Piotr Gawęcki (born 1989), Polish footballer
- Piotr Gembicki (1585–1657), Polish–Lithuanian public official and bishop
- Piotr Gierczak (born 1976), Polish football manager
- Piotr Giro (born 1974), Swedish actor, dancer, and choreographer
- Piotr Giza (born 1980), Polish footballer
- Piotr Gładki (1972–2005), Polish long-distance runner
- Piotr Gliński (born 1954), Polish sociologist and politician
- Piotr Głowacki (born 1980), Polish actor
- Piotr Gontarczyk (born 1970), Polish historian
- Piotr Grabarczyk (born 1982), Polish handball player
- Piotr Greger (born 1964), Polish Roman Catholic bishop
- Piotr Grudzień (1712–1773), Russian Imperial nobleman, diplomat
- Piotr Grudziński (1975–2016), Polish musician
- Piotr Gruszka (born 1977), Polish volleyball player and coach
- Piotr Gryszkiewicz (born 2001), Polish association football player
- Piotr Grzelczak (born 1988), Polish footballer
- Piotr Gurzęda (born 1987), Polish footballer
- Piotr Gutman (born 1941), Polish boxer

== H ==
- Piotr Haczek (born 1977), Polish track and field athlete
- Piotr Hain (born 1991), Polish volleyball player
- Piotr Hallmann (born 1987), Polish mixed martial artist
- Piotr Haren (born 1970), Danish footballer
- Piotr Havik (born 1994), Dutch racing cyclist
- Piotr Hertel (1936–2010), Polish music composer and pianist
- Piotr Hofmański (born 1956), Polish jurist and judge who served as President of the International Criminal Court
- Piotr Hojka (born 1984), Polish rower

== I ==
- Piotr Ianulov (born 1986), Moldovan freestyle wrestler
- Piotr Ikonowicz (born 1956), Polish politician
- Piotr Indyk (fl. 1990s–2010s), Polish-born American professor of computer science and mathematics
- Piotr Iwanicki (born 1984), Polish wheelchair dance competitor
- Piotr Iwaszkiewicz (1959–2021), Polish political historian, translator and diplomat

== J ==
- Piotr Jabłkowski (born 1958), Polish fencer
- Piotr Jabłoński (born 1975), Polish wrestler
- Piotr Janas (born 1970), Polish artist
- Piotr Janowski (1951–2008), Polish violinist
- Piotr Jarecki (born 1955), Polish prelate of the Catholic Church
- Piotr Jarosiewicz (born 1998), Polish handball player
- Piotr Jaroszewicz (1909–1992), post-World War II Polish political figure
- Piotr Jędraszczyk (born 2001), Polish handball player
- Piotr Jegor (born 1968), Polish footballer
- Piotr Johansson (born 1995), Swedish footballer
- Piotr Juszczak (born 1988), Polish rower

== K ==
- Piotr Ibrahim Kalwas (born 1963), Polish novelist and journalist
- Piotr Kamrowski (born 1967), Polish judoka
- Piotr Kantor (born 1992), Polish Olympic volleyball player
- Piotr Karasinski (fl. 1970s–2020s), Polish quantitative analyst
- Piotr Karpienia (born 1979), Polish singer-songwriter
- Piotr Kasperkiewicz (born 1989), Polish cyclist
- Piotr Kędzia (born 1984), Polish sprinter
- Piotr Kieruzel (born 1988), Polish footballer
- Piotr Kiełpikowski (born 1962), Polish fencer
- Piotr Kirpsza (born 1989), Polish cyclist
- Piotr Kiszka (died 1534), Lithuania nobleman
- Piotr Klepczarek (born 1982), Polish footballer
- Piotr Klepczarek (footballer, born 1984), Polish footballer
- Piotr Klimczak (born 1980), Polish sprinter
- Piotr Blastus Kmita (died c. 1632), Polish-Lithuanian Protestant printer and writer
- Piotr Kochanowski (1566–1620), Polish nobleman, poet, and translator
- Piotr Kocąb (born 1952), Polish football manager
- Piotr Kolc (born 1987), Polish footballer
- Piotr Kołodziejczyk (1939–2019), Polish Minister of National Defence
- Piotr Koman (born 1985), Polish footballer
- Piotr Konieczka (1901–1939), Polish Army soldier
- Piotr Kosewicz (born 1974), Polish para-athlete and biathlete
- Piotr Kosiba (1855–1939), Polish friar
- Piotr Kosiorowski (born 1981), Polish footballer
- Piotr Kosmatko (born 1952), Polish sports shooter
- Piotr Kowalski (1927–2004), Polish artist, sculptor, and architect
- Piotr Kozieradzki (born 1970), Polish musician and drummer
- Piotr Krawczyk (born 1994), Polish footballer
- Piotr Kraśko (born 1971), Polish journalist, theatrologist, and television presenter
- Piotr Marek Król (born 1974), Polish politician
- Piotr Krzywicki (1964–2009), Polish politician
- Piotr Kuczera (born 1995), Polish judoka
- Piotr Kuklis (born 1986), Polish footballer
- Piotr Kula (born 1987), Polish sailor
- Piotr Kuleta (born 1989), Polish sprint canoeist
- Piotr Kulpaka (born 1984), Polish footballer
- Piotr Kuncewicz (1936–2007), Polish writer and freemason
- Piotr Kurbiel (born 1996), Polish professional footballer
- Piotr Kurpios (born 1963), Polish politician
- Piotr Kwasigroch (born 1962), Polish ice hockey player and coach

== L ==
- Piotr Łabędź (died 1198), Roman Catholic bishop
- Piotr Lachert (1938–2018), Polish composer, pianist and teacher
- Piotr Langosz (born 1951), Polish basketball player
- Piotr Lech (born 1968), Polish football goalkeeper
- Piotr Leciejewski (born 1985), Polish football goalkeeper
- Piotr Lenar (born 1958), Polish cinematographer
- Piotr Lenartowicz (1934–2012), Polish philosopher and professor
- Piotr Libera (born 1951), Polish bishop
- Piotr Libicz (fl. 1980s–2000s), Polish-born Canadian soccer player
- Piotr Lipiński (born 1979), Polish volleyball player
- Piotr Lisek (born 1992), Polish athlete specialising in the pole vault
- Piotr Lisiecki (born 1993), Polish singer and guitarist
- Piotr Litvinsky (1927–2009), Russian Soviet realist painter and art teacher
- Piotr Łossowski (1925–2025), Polish historian and academic
- Piotr Łukasiewicz (born 1954), Polish sociologist and politician
- Piotr Łukasiewicz (born 1972), Polish diplomat
- Piotr Łukasik (born 1994), Polish volleyball player

== M ==
- Piotr Machalica (1955–2020), Polish actor
- Piotr Madejski (born 1983), Polish footballer
- Piotr Małachowski (born 1983), Polish discus thrower
- Piotr Malarczyk (born 1991), Polish footballer
- Piotr Malinowski (born 1984), Polish footballer
- Piotr Mandrysz (born 1962), Polish football manager
- Piotr Markiewicz (born 1973), Polish sprint canoeist
- Piotr Masłowski (born 1988), Polish handball player
- Piotr Mazur (born 1982), Canadian-born Polish road bicycle racer
- Piotr Mazur (canoeist) (born 1991), Polish sprint canoeist
- Piotr Michael (born 1988), American actor and comedian
- Piotr Michalik (born 1957), Polish bantamweight Greco-Roman wrestler
- Piotr Michalski (born 1994), Polish speed skater
- Piotr Michałowski (1800–1855), Polish artist
- Piotr Midloch (fl. 1990s), Polish sprint canoeist
- Piotr Mieszkowski (died 1652), Polish bishop suffragan
- Piotr Mieszkowski (Junior) (1630–1696), Polish Roman Catholic prelate
- Piotr Migoń (fl. 2010s–2020s), Polish geomorphologist
- Piotr Mikuła (born 1976), Polish field hockey player
- Piotr Misztal (born 1965), Polish politician
- Piotr Misztal (footballer) (born 1987), Polish footballer
- Piotr Molenda (born 1962), Polish table tennis player
- Piotr Morawski (1976–2009), Polish mountaineer
- Piotr Paweł Morta (born 1959), Polish political activist and dissident
- Piotr Moss (born 1949), Polish composer
- Piotr Moszczynski (fl. 1990s–2000s), Polish Paralympic volleyball player
- Piotr Mosór (born 1974), Polish footballer
- Piotr Mowlik (born 1951), Polish footballer
- Piotr Mroziński (born 1992), Polish footballer
- Piotr Müller (born 1989), Polish politician and lawyer
- Piotr Murdzia (born 1975), Polish chess master
- Piotr Myśliwiec (born 1952), Polish diplomat and chemist
- Piotr Myszka (born 1981), Polish windsurfer
- Piotr Myszkowski (multiple people)

== N ==
- Piotr Naimski (born 1951), Polish politician and academic
- Piotr Naszarkowski (born 1952), Polish engraver
- Piotr Nawrot (born 1955), Polish Roman Catholic priest and musicologist
- Piotr Nazarov (1921–1988), Soviet and Russian painter and art teacher
- Piotr Nguyen (born 1991), Polish chess player
- Piotr Nierychło (1921–1976), Polish footballer and manager
- Piotr Nowak (born 1964), Polish footballer
- Piotr Nowakowski (born 1987), Polish volleyball player
- Piotr Tomasz Nowakowski (born 1974), Polish religious researcher
- Piotr Nowina-Konopka (born 1949), Polish academic, politician, and diplomat
- Piotr Nurowski (1945–2010), Polish tennis player

== O ==
- Piotr Ogrodziński (born 1951), Polish diplomat, activist and philosopher
- Piotr Olewiński (born 1968), Polish windsurfer
- Piotr Olszewski (born 1973), Polish rower
- Piotr Opaliński (1586–1624), Polish–Lithuanian nobleman
- Piotr Opaliński (diplomat) (born 1958) Polish diplomat
- Piotr Orczyk (born 1993), Polish volleyball player
- Piotr Orliński (born 1976), Polish footballer
- Piotr Orslowski (born 1974), Polish luger
- Piotr Orzechowski (born 1990), Polish jazz pianist and composer
- Piotr Osiecki (born 1961), Polish politician and rugby union footballer
- Piotr Ostaszewski (born 1964), Polish historian
- Piotr Ożarowski (1725–1794), Polish nobleman, politician, and military commander

== P ==
- Piotr Pac (after 1570–1642), Polish-Lithuanian nobleman
- Piotr Pakhomkin (born 1985) is a Russian-American classical guitarist
- Piotr Paleczny (born 1946), Polish classical pianist
- Piotr Parasiewicz (fl. 1980s–2010s), Austrian-American river professor
- Piotr Parczewski (1590–1658), Polish-Lithuanian Roman Catholic bishop
- Piotr Parzyszek (born 1993), Polish footballer
- Piotr Pawlicki (multiple people)
- Piotr Pawłowski (canoeist) (born 1959), Polish sprint canoer
- Piotr Pawłowski (actor) (1925–2012), Polish actor
- Piotr Pawlukiewicz (1960–2020), Polish Roman Catholic priest
- Piotr Paziński (multiple people)
- Piotr Perkowski (1901–1990), Polish composer
- Piotr Petasz (born 1984), Polish footballer
- Piotr Piasecki (born 1952), Polish equestrian
- Piotr Piątek (born 1982), Polish archer
- Piotr Piechniak (born 1977), Polish footballer
- Piotr Piecuch (born 1960), Polish-born American physical chemist
- Piotr Piekarski (multiple people)
- Piotr Pierzchała (born 1999), Polish footballer
- Piotr Plewnia (born 1977), Polish footballer
- Piotr Polczak (born 1986), Polish footballer
- Piotr Polk (born 1962), Polish actor and singer
- Piotr Ponikowski (born 1961), Polish cardiologist
- Piotr Popik (born 1962), Polish neuropsychopharmacologist
- Piotr Potworowski (1898–1962), Polish painter and designer
- Piotr Protasiewicz (born 1975), Polish speedway rider
- Piotr Przybecki (born 1972), Polish handball player and coach
- Piotr Przydział (born 1974), Polish racing cyclist
- Piotr Prędota (born 1982), Polish footballer
- Piotr Pręgowski (born 1954), Polish actor
- Piotr Pustelnik (born 1951), Polish alpine and high-altitude climber
- Piotr Pyrdoł (born 1999), Polish professional footballer
- Piotr Pytlakowski (born 1951), Polish journalist and screenwriter

== R ==
- Piotr Wysz Radoliński (c. 1354–1414), Polish bishop
- Piotr Radziszewski (born 1970), Polish urologist
- Piotr Rajkiewicz (born 1967), Polish footballer
- Piotr Reiss (born 1972), Polish footballer
- Piotr Robakowski (born 1990), Polish footballer
- Piotr Rocki (1974–2020), Polish footballer
- Piotr Rogucki (born 1978), Polish singer, musician, and actor
- Piotr Romke (born 1959), Polish footballer
- Piotr Rubik (born 1968), Polish composer
- Piotr Ruszkul (born 1985), Polish footballer
- Piotr Rychlik (born 1984), Polish diplomat
- Piotr Rysiukiewicz (born 1974), Polish sprinter
- Piotr Rzepka (born 961), Polish footballer

== S ==
- Piotr Salaber (born 1966), Polish composer, conductor, and pianist
- Piotr Samiec-Talar (born 2001), Polish footballer
- Piotr Sarata (fl. 1980s), Polish slalom canoeist
- Piotr Sawczuk (born 1962), Polish Roman Catholic bishop
- Piotr Semenenko (1814–1886), Polish theologian of the Roman Catholic Church
- Piotr Setkiewicz (born 1963), Polish historian
- Piotr Siejwa, Polish para athlete
- Piotr Siemionowski (born 1988), Polish sprint canoeist
- Piotr Skarga (1536–1612), Polish Jesuit, preacher, hagiographer, and polemicist
- Piotr Skiba (born 1982), Polish football goalkeeper
- Piotr Skierski (born 1971), Polish table tennis player
- Piotr Skowron (born 1985), Polish professor of Computer science
- Piotr Skowyrski (fl. 2010s), better known as Izak, Polish esports commentator and social media personality
- Piotr Skrobowski (born 1961), Polish footballer
- Piotr Skrzynecki (1930–1997), Polish choreographer, director and cabaret impresari
- Piotr Skuratowicz (1891–1940), Polish general
- Piotr Słonimski (1922–2009), Polish-born French geneticist
- Piotr Ślusarczyk (born 1979), Polish politician
- Piotr Śmietański (1899–1950), Polish non-commissioned officer and communist functionary
- Piotr Smoleński (died 1942), Polish cryptographer
- Piotr Snopek (born 1991), Polish pair skater
- Piotr Kmita Sobieński (1477–1553), Polish nobleman
- Piotr Sobociński (1958–2001), Polish cinematographer
- Piotr Sobotta (born 1940), Polish high jumper
- Piotr Soczyński (born 1967), Polish footballer
- Piotr Sowisz (born 1971), Polish footballer
- Piotr Stachiewicz (1858–1938), Polish painter and illustrator
- Piotr Starzyński (born 2004), Polish footballer
- Piotr Stawarczyk (born 1983), Polish footballer
- Piotr Stańczak (c. 1966–2009), Polish geologist
- Piotr Steinkeller (1799–1854), Polish entrepreneur
- Piotr Stępień (born 1963), Polish wrestler
- Piotr Stoiński (multiple people)
- Piotr Stokowiec (born 1963), Polish wrestler
- Piotr Świderski (born 1983), Polish speedway rider
- Piotr Świerczewski (born 1972), Polish footballer
- Piotr Świst (born 1968), Polish speedway rider
- Piotr Świtalski (born 1957), Polish diplomat
- Piotr Suski (1942–2009), Polish footballer
- Piotr Szarek (1908–1939), Polish Catholic clergyman
- Piotr Szarpak (born 1971), Polish footballer
- Piotr Szczechowicz (born 1976), Polish football manager
- Piotr Szczepanik (1942–2020), Polish singer
- Piotr Szczepański (born 1988), Polish canoeist
- Piotr Szczotka (born 1981), Polish basketball player
- Piotr Szczypa (born 1948), Polish figure skater and figure skating coach
- Piotr Szczęsny (1963–2017), Polish chemist
- Piotr Sztompka (born 1944), Polish sociologist
- Piotr Szulczewski (born 1981), Polish businessman and computer engineer
- Piotr Szulkin (1950–2018), Polish film director and writer
- Piotr Szyhalski (born 1967), Polish-born multimedia artist in the United States
- Piotr Szymiczek (born 1982), Polish footballer

== T ==
- Piotr Tarkowski (born 1999), Polish long jumper
- Piotr Fergusson Tepper (1713–1794), Polish–Lithuanian banker
- Piotr Tobolski (born 1958), Polish rower
- Piotr Tomasik (born 1987), Polish footballer
- Piotr Tomaszewski (born 1974), Polish classical guitarist
- Piotr Tomicki (1464–1535), Polish Roman Catholic bishop
- Piotr Trafarski (born 1983), Polish footballer
- Piotr Triebler (1898–1952), Polish sculptor
- Piotr Trochowski (born 1984), Polish-born German footballer
- Piotr Trzaskalski (born 1964), Polish film director and screenwriter
- Piotr Tworek (born 1975), Polish football manager
- Piotr Tyszkiewicz (born 1970), Polish footballer

== U ==
- Piotr Ugrumov (born 1961), Russian cyclist
- Piotr Uklański (born 1968), Polish-American artist
- Piotr Uszok (born 1955), Polish politician

== V ==
- Piotr Vasiliev (1909–1989), Russian Soviet realist painter

== W ==
- Piotr Wadecki (born 1973), Polish professional road racing cyclist
- Piotr Waglowski (born 1974), Polish lawyer, poet, publicist, webmaster, and open government activist
- Piotr Wala (1936–2013), Polish ski jumper
- Piotr S. Wandycz (1923–2017), Polish-American historian
- Piotr Wawryniuk (born 1943), Polish equestrian
- Piotr Wawrzeniuk (born 1971), Polish historian and musician
- Piotr Wawrzyniak (1849–1910), Polish priest and activist
- Piotr Wiaderek (born 1984), Polish sprinter
- Piotr Wilczek (born 1962), Polish intellectual historian
- Piotr Wilczewski (born 1978), Polish boxer
- Piotr Wilniewczyc (1887–1960), Polish engineer and arms designer
- Piotr Witasik (born 1992), Polish footballer
- Piotr Wiwczarek (born 1965), Polish musician
- Piotr Więcek (born 1990), Polish drifting driver
- Piotr Wiśniewski (born 1982), Polish footballer
- Piotr Wiśnik (born 1950), Polish football manager
- Piotr Odmieniec Włast (1876–1949), Polish writer
- Piotr Wlazło (born 1989), Polish footballer
- Piotr Włodarczyk (born 1977), Polish footballer
- Piotr Włostowic (1080–1153), Polish nobleman
- Piotr Wójcik (born 1965), Polish athlete specialising in sprint hurdles
- Piotr Wójcik, (born 1967), Polish photojournalist
- Piotr Wojdyga (born 1962), Polish football goalkeeper
- Piotr Wojtczak (born 1963), Polish diplomat
- Piotr Dunin Wolski (1531–1590), Polish–Lithuanian-born bishop and diplomat
- Piotr Woźniak (multiple people)
- Piotr Wróbel (born 1953), Polish-Canadian historian
- Piotr Wysocki (1797–1875), Polish captain and leader of the Polish conspiracy against Russian Tsar Nicolas I
- Piotr Wyszomirski (born 1988), Polish handball player

== Z ==
- Piotr Zajlich (1884–1948), Polish dancer and choreographer
- Piotr Zajączkowski (born 1966), Polish footballer and manager
- Piotr Zak, fictional Polish composer created by BBC producers as part of a hoax broadcast
- Piotr Zaradny (born 1972), Polish racing cyclist
- Piotr Zawojski (born 1963), Polish media expert
- Piotr Zborowski (died 1580), Polish–Lithuanian politician
- Piotr Zbylitowski (1569–1649), Polish poet
- Piotr Żemło (born 1995), Polish footballer
- Piotr Zgorzelski (born 1963), Polish politician and teacher
- Piotr Zieliński (born 1994), Polish footballer
- Piotr Zioła (born 1995), Polish rock singer
- Piotr Żyła (born 1987), Polish ski jumper

== See also ==
- Piotr i Paweł, Polish supermarket chain founded in 1990
- List of people named Pyotr
