= Pierzchała =

Pierzchała may refer to:

- Pierzchała coat of arms
- Pierzchała (surname)
