= Piotr Wójcik (disambiguation) =

Piotr Wójcik (born 1965) is a Polish athlete.

Piotr Wójcik may also refer to:

- Piotr Wójcik (photojournalist), (born 1967), Polish photojournalist
