= Zawojski =

Zawojski (feminine: Zawojska; plural: Zawojscy) is a Polish surname. Notable people with the surname include:

- Agnieszka Kobus-Zawojska (born 1990), Polish rower
- Piotr Zawojski (born 1963), Polish film historian
