= Pierzchała (surname) =

Pierzchała is a Polish surname. Notable people with this surname include:

- Elżbieta Pierzchała (born 1954), Polish politician
- Piotr Pierzchała (born 1999), Polish footballer
