= Piotr Parasiewicz =

Polish river scientist and environmental engineer

- Parasiewicz in 2016
- Education: University of Natural Resources and Life Sciences, Vienna
- Known for: MesoHABSIM
- Scientific career
- Fields: Ecohydraulics, river restoration, aquatic habitat modelling
- Workplaces: University of Natural Resources and Life Sciences, Vienna; Cornell University; University of Massachusetts Amherst; Rushing Rivers Institute; Stanisław Sakowicz Inland Fisheries Institute; Warsaw University of Life Sciences

Piotr Parasiewicz is a Polish environmental engineer and river scientist. He developed MesoHABSIM, a multiscale method for modelling instream habitat, and is director of the Rushing Rivers Institute.

== Education ==
Parasiewicz studied civil and environmental engineering and water management at the University of Natural Resources and Life Sciences, Vienna, commonly known as BOKU. He completed an undergraduate degree in 1988, a Diplom-Ingenieur degree in 1993 and a summa cum laude doctorate in 1998. In 2012, he completed a habilitation in fisheries, specializing in river-fish ecology, at the Stanisław Sakowicz Inland Fisheries Institute.

== Career ==
From 1988 to 1999, Parasiewicz held research and teaching positions at BOKU's Department of Hydrobiology, Fisheries and Aquaculture, first as a research assistant and later as a university lecturer. From 1995 to 1999, he taught a field-based course on the eco-morphology of running waters. His work in Austria combined hydraulic engineering and aquatic ecology. It included the development of automated, geodetically based methods for surveying physical river habitat, the development of the Depth Velocity Position instrument for habitat measurements, and an interdisciplinary assessment of the ecological effects of hydropower peaking on the Bregenzer Ach. He also participated in the River Ecology subnetwork of the Austrian Network for Environmental Research and co-authored its 1999 report on running-water research in Austria.

In 1999, Parasiewicz received a David H. Smith fellowship from The Nature Conservancy and moved to the United States. He was a postdoctoral fellow at the New York Cooperative Fish and Wildlife Research Unit and subsequently directed the Instream Habitat Program in the Department of Natural Resources at Cornell University from 1999 to 2004. He held overlapping appointments at the University of Massachusetts Amherst and the University of Connecticut, becoming a research associate professor at Massachusetts from 2004 to 2007, and then worked as a research associate and adjunct professor at Mount Holyoke College from 2007 to 2009. In 2007, he founded the Rushing Rivers Institute, a nonprofit river-research organization, where he serves as director.

Parasiewicz returned to Poland in 2011 and joined the River Fisheries Department of the Stanisław Sakowicz Inland Fisheries Institute. He became head of the department in 2020. From 2016 to 2020, he coordinated the second work package of the European Union-funded Adaptive Management of Barriers in European Rivers (AMBER) project. From 2019 to 2023, he served on Poland's State Water Management Council. In 2023, Parasiewicz received the Polish state title of professor in agricultural sciences, in the discipline of animal science and fisheries. The President of Poland presented him with the professorial appointment act on 6 November 2024. In 2024, he became a member of the Committee on Water Sciences and Water Management of the Polish Academy of Sciences. Parasiewicz is a professor in the Environmental Monitoring and Modelling Laboratory at the Warsaw University of Life Sciences.

== Research ==
Parasiewicz's early research at BOKU addressed the measurement and modelling of river habitat, hydropower impacts, fish passage and river restoration. This work provided a foundation for his later development of MesoHABSIM. In 2001, he introduced the method as an approach for applying physical-habitat models at whole-river scales, changing the analytical resolution from microhabitats to mesohabitats. A 2007 paper revised the method to combine assessments of ecological integrity with quantitative simulations of physical-habitat distribution at watershed scale. His later work included multiscale habitat modelling for endangered freshwater mussels and a review of the effects of floods and droughts on river ecosystems under climate change. Parasiewicz was the first author of a 2023 Nature Communications study estimating that impoundments had altered more than 200,000 km of formerly free-flowing river habitat in Europe.

== Selected publications ==
- Parasiewicz, Piotr; Belka, Kamila; Łapińska, Małgorzata; et al. (2023). "Over 200,000 kilometers of free-flowing river habitat in Europe is altered due to impoundments". Nature Communications. 14. 6289. doi:10.1038/s41467-023-40922-6. PMC 10562483.
- Parasiewicz, Piotr; King, Elise L.; Webb, J. Angus; et al. (2019). "The role of floods and droughts on riverine ecosystems under a changing climate". Fisheries Management and Ecology. 26 (6): 461–473. doi:10.1111/fme.12388.
- Parasiewicz, Piotr; Castelli, Elena; Rogers, Joseph N.; Plunkett, Ethan (2012). "Multiplex modeling of physical habitat for endangered freshwater mussels". Ecological Modelling. 228: 66–75. doi:10.1016/j.ecolmodel.2011.12.023.
- Parasiewicz, Piotr (2007). "The MesoHABSIM model revisited". River Research and Applications. 23 (8): 893–903. doi:10.1002/rra.1045.
- Parasiewicz, Piotr (2001). "MesoHABSIM: A concept for application of instream flow models in river restoration planning". Fisheries. 26 (9): 6–13.
- Parasiewicz, Piotr; Hofmann, Christian; Höglinger, Bernhard (1999). "The DVP (Depth Velocity Position) bar—a multiplex instrument for physical habitat measurements in small riverine domains". Regulated Rivers: Research & Management. 15 (1–3): 77–86.
- Parasiewicz, Piotr; Schmutz, Stefan; Moog, Otto (1998). "The effects of managed hydropower peaking on the physical habitat, benthos and fish fauna in the River Bregenzerach in Austria". Fisheries Management and Ecology. 5 (5): 403–417. doi:10.1046/j.1365-2400.1998.550403.x.
- Parasiewicz, Piotr (1996). "Estimation of physical habitat characteristics using automation and geodesic-based sampling". Regulated Rivers: Research & Management. 12 (6): 575–583.
