= Katechizm Poręczny =

Polish radio program

Katechizm Poręczny (literally in English, the Wearable Catechism) was a Polish radio program broadcast on Sundays from 22:00 to 23:30 on Radio Plus. The subject of the program concerned religion, morality, and above all, the understanding of Christianity and its principles in the Roman Catholic approach. Questions sent by listeners by e-mail or by traditional letter were answered by Fr. Piotr Pawlukiewicz, and the presenter Paweł Krzemiński familiarized him with their content, making sure that the answers were comprehensive and without any doubts. Responses from the "Catechism" have been quoted in the Catholic press.

The program was also broadcast on Radio Józef, where it was very popular. From the beginning of broadcasting, apart from Father Pawlukiewicz, various broadcasters co-hosted the programs. The last part of "Catechism", added in 2011, was devoted to free discussion between Mr. Paweł and Fr. Peter, in which they exchanged opinions on a previously selected topic.
