= Mesohabitat simulation model =

- Other names: MesoHABSIM
- Classification: Simulation model
- Inventor: Dr. Piotr Parasiewicz

Mesohabitat simulation model (MesoHABSIM), created by Dr. Piotr Parasiewicz, addresses the requirements of watershed-based management of running waters and is designed to predict an aquatic community's response to habitat modification.

== Overview ==
MesoHABSIM builds upon pre-existing physical habitat simulation models (e.g. PHABSIM) which is an essential component of the United States government's methods for establishing minimum stream flow requirements. MesoHABSIM is an augmentation of this system, designed during a restoration study of the Quinebaug River. The changing spatial distributions of physical attributes of a river as a result of variations in flow and the biological responses of aquatic species to these changes, provide the basis for simulating the consequences of ecosystem alteration, and consequently the justification of restoration measures. MesoHABSIM modifies the data acquisition technique and analytical approach of similar models by changing the scale of resolution from micro- to meso-scales. Due to this increase in scale, the model takes variations in stream morphology along the river into account and allows for application in larger-scale projects.

== Data collection and analysis ==
Mesohabitat types are defined by their hydromorphological units (HMUs), such as pools and rapids, geomorphology, land cover and other hydrological characteristics. Mesohabitats are mapped under multiple flow conditions at extensive sites along the river. Fish data is collected in randomly distributed mesohabitats where habitat surveys are also conducted. This allows modeling of available fish habitat at a range of flows. Rating curves represent the changes in relative area of suitable habitat in response to flow and allow for the determination of habitat quantity at any given flow within the range of surveys. These rating curves can be developed for river units of any size allowing conclusions to be drawn about the suitability of channel patterns or habitat structures for various species of fish for specific sections as well as for the entire river. Rating curves can also be used to evaluate the benefits of various restoration measures on the entire fish community. In combination with hydrologic time series, rating curves are used to create Continuous Under Threshold (CUT) curves for the analysis of frequency, magnitude and duration of significant habitat events. The CUT curve technique described by Capra et al. (1995) defines critical thresholds and determines what habitat variability and availability is necessary to support the target river fauna. CUT curves evaluate durations of unsuitable habitat under a specified threshold by comparing continuous durations in days under this threshold to the cumulative durations in the study period. A highly useful product of the CUT curves are reference tables that can be used to determine how long a given species can tolerate unsuitable conditions depending on its life stage.

== Results ==
To use physical habitat models to analyze and predict ecosystem potential, compositions must also be determined of the native fish community and a subset of species must be selected for model development. The development of a Reference Fish Community (RFC) is based on the Target Fish Community approach, described by Bain and Meixler (2000). A comprehensive list of species is generated from literature sources and available regional data collected on relatively intact river reaches. The species are ranked on the basis of abundance in long-term fish collection data from multiple rivers of similar character. Securing habitat for naturally occurring dominant species (ecology) should preserve the most profound characteristics of the ecosystem, providing survival conditions for the majority of the aquatic community and therefore a reference for restoration efforts. The simplest way to create a river habitat model is therefore to select the five to ten highest ranking species for model development. It can then be assumed that community structure reflects habitat structure; therefore, the most common species should indicate the most common habitat. Since habitat availability forms the structure of aquatic fauna, the affinity between the structure of the river habitat and the structure of the fish community can be used as a measure of habitat quality.

The results of MesoHABSIM create the framework for integrative analysis of many aspects of the ecosystem. It also allows managers to recreate reference conditions and evaluate possible instream and watershed restoration measures or alterations (such as dam removals or changes in water withdrawals). From the perspective of resource managers, it not only allows for quantitative measures of ecological integrity, but also creates a basis for making decisions where trade-offs between resource use and river restoration need to be considered.

== Publications involving the MesoHABSIM Model ==
- Parasiewicz, P. (2008): Application of MesoHABSIM and target fish community approaches for selecting restoration measures of the Quinebaug River, Connecticut and Massachusetts, USA. River Research and Application. 24: 459–471.
- Parasiewicz, P. (2007): The MesoHABSIM Model Revisited. River Research and Application 23 (8):893–903.
- Parasiewicz, P. (2007): Developing a reference habitat template and ecological management scenarios using the MesoHABSIM model. River Research and Application 23 (8): 924–932.
- Parasiewicz P. (2001): MesoHABSIM – a concept for application of instream flow models in river restoration planning. Fisheries 29 (9) p. 6–13.
- Parasiewicz, P., J. Nestler, N.L. Poff and A. Goodwin. (2008) Virtual Reference River: A Model for Scientific Discovery and Reconciliation. 2008. In: M. S. Alonso, I. M. Rubio (ed) Ecological Management: New Research, Nova Science Publishers, Inc. pp. – ISBN 978-1-60456-786-1
- Parasiewicz, P., J. Rogers, J. Legros and M. Wirth. 2007. Assessment and restoration of instream habitat of the Eightmile River in Connecticut – Developing MesoHABSIM model. The National Park Service, Wild and Scenic River Study for the Eightmile River and the Eightmile River Wild and Scenic Study Committee. pp 62. https://web.archive.org/web/20080513142903/http://www.neihp.org/projects/eightmile/index.htm
- Parasiewicz, P. Ehmann, S. B. & P. Corp (2003). Fish habitat assessment on Stony Clove Creek, NY using MesoHABSIM. Report for New York City Department of Environmental Protection and Green County Soil and Water Conservation District and New York State Water Resources Institute. 410pp
- PARASIEWICZ, P. & S. EHMANN: MesoHABSIM application on the Quinebaug River, MA. Managing the flows for biodiversity – A conference on science, policy and conservation action. Colorado State University. Fort Collins, CO 7/30-8/2/2001
- Parasiewicz P. (2001): MesoHABSIM application on the Quinebaug River – the success story. 57th Northeast Fish and Wildlife Conference, Saratoga Springs, NY, 4/22-25/2001.
- PARASIEWICZ, P. & S. EHEMANN (2001): MesoHABSIM application on the Quinebaug River, MA. Managing the flows for biodiversity – A conference on science, policy and conservation action. Colorado State University. Fort Collins, CO 7/30-8/2/2001
- Parasiewicz P. & M. B. Bain (2000): MesoHABSIM or modeling of physical habitat at the scale relevant to river restoration planning. EISORS – Eight International Symposium on Regulated Rivers – Toulouse, France 8/17 – 21 August 2000.
- Parasiewicz P., E. Hammond, J. Xu & D. Ivanov (2006) MesoHABSIM Software
