= Maciej Pisarski =

Polish diplomat

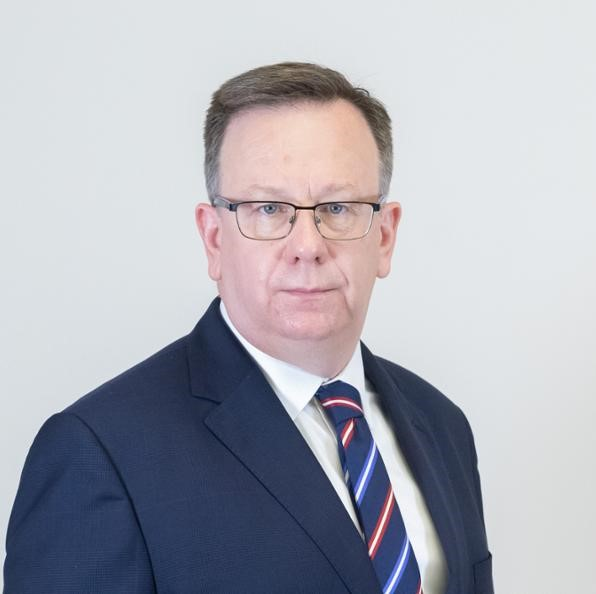

Poland Ambassador to Pakistan
- Incumbent
- Assumed office 14 October 2021
- Preceded by: Piotr Opaliński

Personal details
- Education: University of Warsaw
- Profession: Diplomat

Maciej Pisarski is a Polish diplomat, serving as an ambassador to Pakistan (since 2021).

== Life ==
Pisarski holds an M.A. in history from the University of Warsaw. He graduated also from the National School of Public Administration, Warsaw.

In April 1998, Pisarski joined the Ministry of Foreign Affairs. He was serving several times at the Embassy in Washington, also on the post of deputy head of mission and chargé d’affaires to the United States (29 July 2012 – 21 September 2012, 2016). At the Ministry he was holding the posts of deputy director (2008) and director (2018–2021) of the Department of Foreign Policy Strategy. He was also minister envoy to the Jewish diaspora (2017–2018) and head of Polish delegation to the International Holocaust Remembrance Alliance (IHRA). He was member of the Polish Institute of International Affairs Conucil and the Institute of Central Europe Council (2019–2021). In June 2021, he was appointed ambassador to Pakistan and took his post on 14 October 2021. He presented his letter of credence to the President Arif Alvi on 22 November 2021.

== Honours ==
- Gold Cross of Merit (2013)
