= Piotr Tomasz Nowakowski =

Piotr Tomasz Nowakowski (born 1974, in Tychy, Poland) is a Polish researcher, Doctor of Pedagogy, Assistant Professor at the John Paul II Catholic University of Lublin.

He is a Member of the International Cultic Studies Association (ICSA), Florida (USA). He holds the position of a secretary for international cooperation at the Polish quarterly "Społeczeństwo i Rodzina". He is "ICSA Today’s" (USA) news correspondent for Eastern Europe, is a Member of Editorial Board of the US annual "International Journal of Cultic Studies" (USA), and a consulting editor for Nigerian quarterly "Journal of Educational Review".

== Research ==
Fields of scientific research and interest of Nowakowski are: social prevention, social work, social rehabilitation, mass media pedagogy, philosophy of education, and aretology.

Nowakowski has given guest lectures at Kymenlaakso University of Applied Sciences (Finland, 2008), University of Gothenburg (Sweden, 2009), Başkent University (Turkey, 2010), and Alice Salomon University of Applied Sciences Berlin (Germany, 2011). In 2010 he conducted a research project The Problem of School Violence in California: Preventive Aspects at the University of Southern California (Los Angeles, USA).

Nowakowski is an author and editor of several books and an author of many articles in the fields of social and pedagogical issues – he has published in the Slovak quarterly "Rozmer", in the Ukrainian "Visnyk", the Nigerian "Journal of Educational Review", the Brazilian "Educação", the Bolivian "Yachay" and the American "ICSA Today" as well as the "International Journal of Arts and Sciences".

== Works ==
=== Books ===
- Sekty: co każdy powinien wiedzieć [Cults: What One Should Know] (1999)
- Sekty: oblicza werbunku [Cults: Faces of Recruitment] (2001)
- Fast food dla mózgu, czyli telewizja i okolice [Fast Food for Mind, i.e., Television and Surroundings] (2002)
- Modele człowieka propagowane w czasopismach młodzieżowych. Analiza antropologiczno-etyczna [Models of Man Propagated in Selected Magazines for Young People. An Anthropological and Ethical Analysis] (2004)

=== Joint publication editing ===
- The Phenomenon of Cults from a Scientific Perspective, Cracow 2007. ISBN 978-83-7569-025-5
- Sekty jako problem współczesności [Cults as a Problem of Contemporary Reality], Mysłowice 2008. ISBN 978-83-89032-23-2
- Higher Education in Nigeria: Selected Aspects, Bloomington, IN (USA) 2010. ISBN 978-1-4269-2972-4
