= Piotr Ostaszewski =

Polish historian (born 1964)

Prof. Piotr Ostaszewski
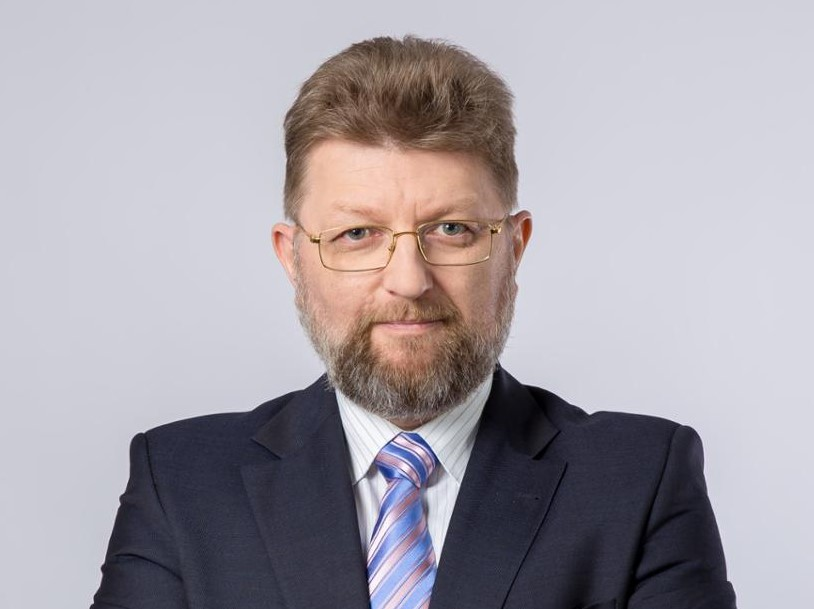

7th Poland Ambassador to South Korea
- In office 24 September 2017 – July 2024
- Preceded by: Krzysztof Majka
- Succeeded by: Bartosz Wiśniewski

Personal details
- Born: 5 April 1964 (age 62) Żyrardów, Poland
- Education: University of Warsaw
- Profession: Historian, political scientist, translator, professor

Piotr Ostaszewski (born 5 April 1964, Żyrardów) is a Polish historian, political scientist and translator. From 2017 to 2024 he served as an ambassador to South Korea.

== Life ==
Piotr Ostaszewski was born on 5 April 1964 in Żyrardów. Ostaszewski sat for an M.A. and Ph.D. in history at the University of Warsaw respectively in 1990 and 1998 for his thesis on Harry S. Truman's policy toward Vietnam. In 2004 he attained a post-doctoral degree at the Adam Mickiewicz University in Poznań. In 2013 he became a full professor. He specializes in 20th-century international relations in Asia.

Between 1990 and 2000 he worked at the University of Warsaw American Studies Center. In 2000 he has been visiting professor at Kent State University giving lectures on the US-China modern relations and modern history of Cambodia. In 2000 he became lecturer at the Warsaw School of Economics. Since 2005 he has been Head of Department of Political Studies and, between 2012 and 2016 vice-rector for teaching and student affairs.

On 24 September 2017 he was appointed ambassador to South Korea. He ended his term in July 2024.

He speaks English and Italian.

== Works ==
=== Books ===
- Amerykańska wojna w Wietnamie, 1965–1973, w opinii dwóch pokoleń społeczeństwa polskiego, Warszawa: Ośrodek Studiów Amerykańskich. Uniwersytet Warszawski, 1999.
- Wietnam: najdłuższy konflikt powojennego świata 1945–1975, Warszawa: Wydawnictwo DiG, 2000.
- Kambodża: zapomniana wojna 1970–1975: (dojście Czerwonych Khmerów do władzy), Toruń: Wydawnictwo Adam Marszałek, 2003.
- Międzynarodowe stosunki polityczne: zarys wykładów, Warszawa: Wydawnictwo Książka i Wiedza, 2008, 2010.
- Laos: konflikt wewnętrzny i międzynarodowy 1945–1975, Toruń: Wydawnictwo Adam Marszałek, 2011.
- Chińska Republika Ludowa we współczesnych stosunkach międzynarodowych (ed.), Warszawa: Szkoła Główna Handlowa - Oficyna Wydawnicza, 2011.

=== Translations ===
- Maldwyn Jones, Historia USA, Gdańsk: Marabut 2002, 2003.
- John Lewis Gaddis, Strategie powstrzymywania: analiza polityki bezpieczeństwa narodowego Stanów Zjednoczonych w okresie zimnej wojny, Warszawa: Książka i Wiedza, 2007.
- David Owen, Chorzy u władzy: sekrety przywódców politycznych ostatnich stu lat, Warszawa: PIW, 2013.
