= Piotr Pawlicki =

Piotr Pawlicki may refer to:

- Piotr Pawlicki Sr. (born 1963), Polish speedway rider
- Piotr Pawlicki Jr. (born 1994), Polish speedway rider, son of the above
