= Piotr Pawlukiewicz =

Polish Roman Catholic priest (1960–2020)

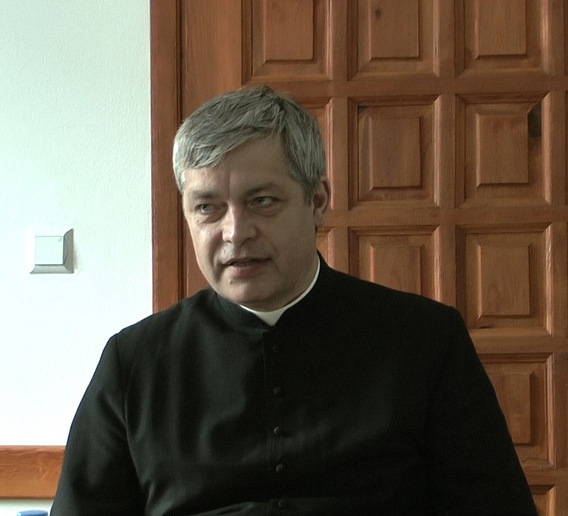
- Piotr Pawlukiewicz in 2011

Personal life
- Born: 10 April 1960 Warsaw, Poland
- Died: 21 March 2020 (aged 59) Warsaw, Poland
- Resting place: Powązki Cemetery
- Honours: Officer's Cross of Order of Polonia Restituta

Religious life
- Religion: Roman Catholic Church

Piotr Pawlukiewicz (10 April 1960 – 21 March 2020) was a Polish Roman Catholic priest, doctor of pastoral theology, retreatist, preacher, prelate, canon of the Warsaw Metropolitan Chapter, author of books on religious topics.

== Biography ==
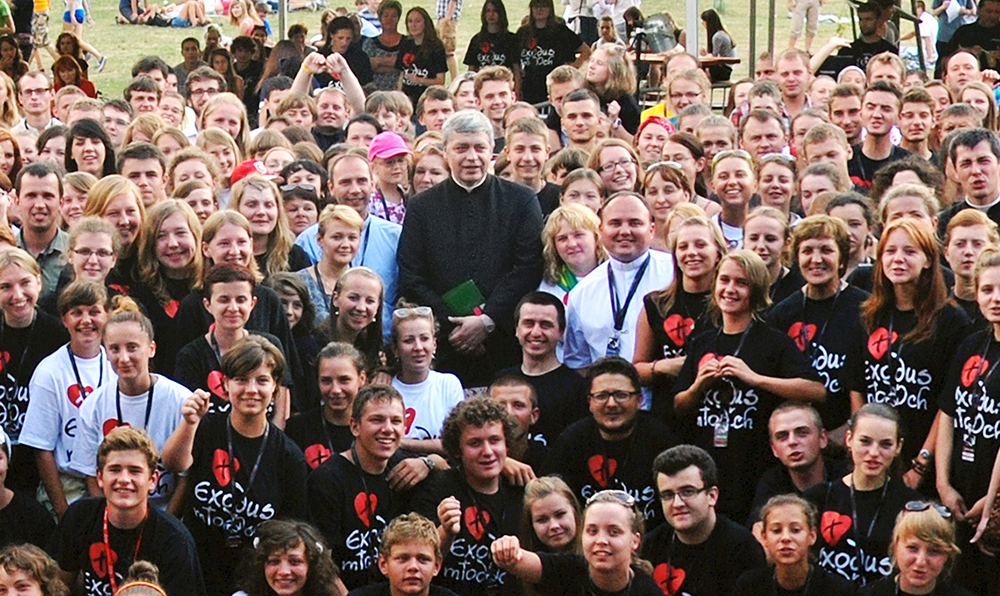
Piotr Pawlukiewicz with youth (2012)

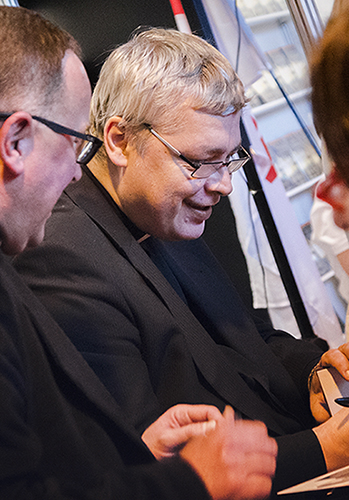
Piotr Pawlukiewicz while signing the book "Czarny humor" (2016)

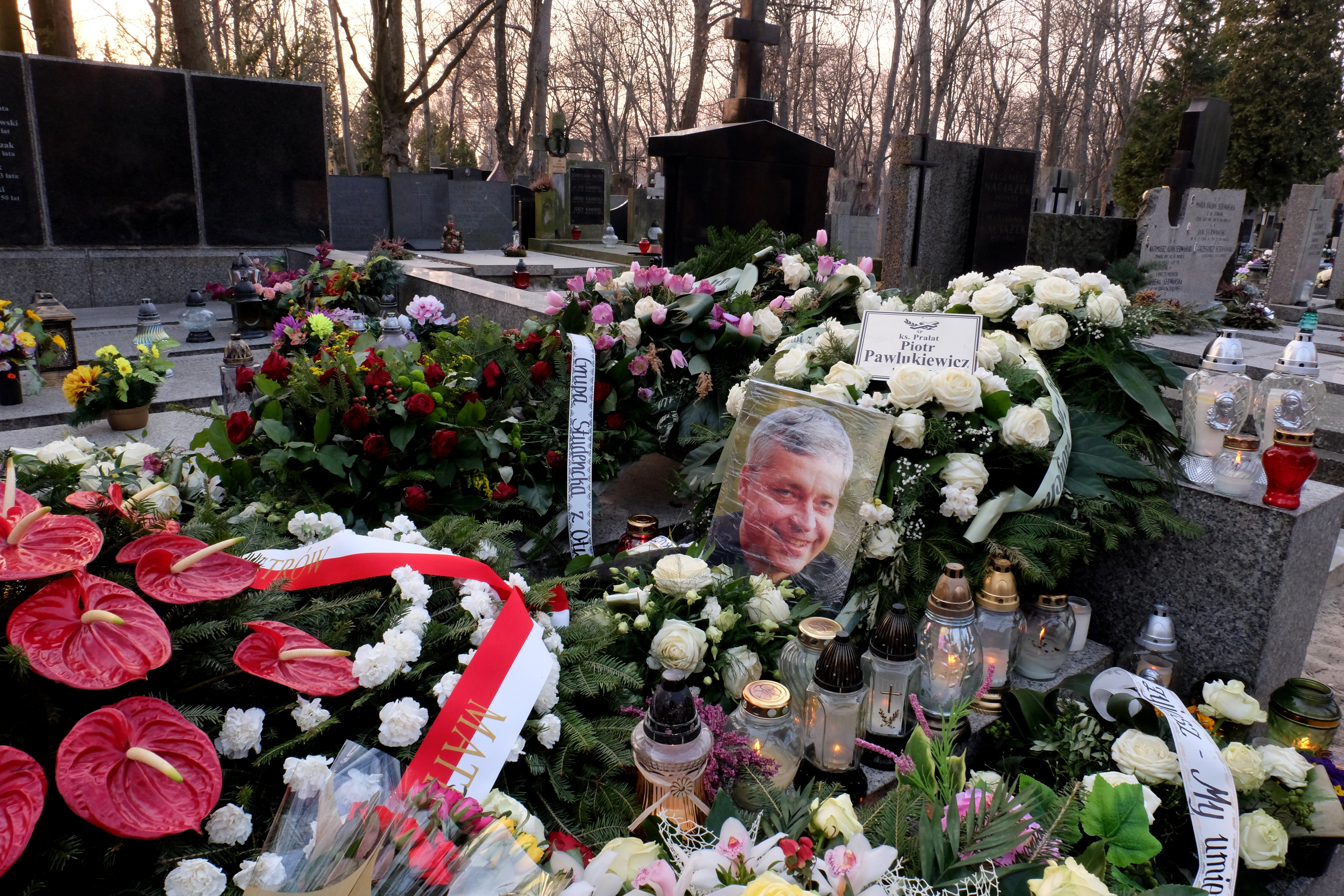
The grave of Piotr Pawlukiewicz at the Powązki Cemetery in Warsaw (2020)

He studied pastoral theology at the Catholic University of Lublin, homiletics at the Pontifical Academy of Theology in Kraków and rhetoric at the Jagiellonian University. In 1985 he graduated from the Higher Metropolitan Seminary in Warsaw. He was ordained a priest on 2 June 1985. For two years he worked as a vicar in the parish of st. Vincent de Paul in Otwock. Then he performed i.a. the function of the prefect and lecturer of pastoral theology at the Major Metropolitan Seminary, as well as the director of the Pastoral Department of the Warsaw Curia. In the years 1991–1999 he was involved in the works of the Second Polish Plenary Synod. From 1992, he was a member of the radio editorial office of the holy mass at the Holy Cross Church in Warsaw. He preached during the mass broadcast by Polish Radio at 9 am.

In 1996–1998 he was the editor-in-chief of Radio Józef in Warsaw. He collaborated with Radio Plus, where he hosted the Katechizm Poręczny program devoted primarily to answers to listeners' questions about the practical aspects of faith. For many years, he also preached the highly popular sermons at 15:00 in the St. Anne's Church (Central Academic Chaplaincy Center). In 1999 he was appointed lecturer of homiletics at the Major Metropolitan Seminary in Warsaw and of theology of the word at the Pontifical Faculty of Theology.

In the years 2000-2010 he was the chaplain of the chapel in the Sejm of the Republic of Poland and the chaplain of parliamentarians.

He preached numerous retreats both in parishes and churches, as well as stationary ones for groups of participants – in many Polish cities and for Polish communities abroad. The most famous of the conferences he gives are those on love and sexuality, including Seks – poezja czy rzemiosło? (Sex – Poetry or Craft?). His books have been translated into Russian, Belarusian, Ukrainian, Lithuanian, Hungarian and Spanish.

== Death ==
He died on 21 March 2020 in Warsaw at the age of 59. He was buried on 25 March 2020 at the Powązki Cemetery, in the priestly grave, in the quarters 153. Due to the prevailing COVID-19 pandemic, the number of funeral participants was limited to the closest family members and celebrants. The funeral mass, broadcast on Telewizja Trwam, Radio Maryja and the Internet, was celebrated by the Metropolitan of Warsaw, Cardinal Kazimierz Nycz.

== Private life ==
For many years he struggled with Parkinson's disease.

== Decorations ==
- Officer's Cross of the Order of Polonia Restituta (2020, posthumously)

== Publications ==
- Z młodzieżą spokojnie o... wolności, Oficyna Wydawnicza Liberton, Warsaw 1995, ISBN 83-900896-4-5.
- Z rodzicami spokojnie o młodzieży. Z młodzieżą spokojnie o rodzicach, Warsaw 1996, ISBN 83-900896-5-3.
- Dzieciom o mszy świętej, Oficyna Wydawnicza Liberton, Warsaw 1996, ISBN 83-900896-6-1.
- Dzieciom o sakramencie pojednania, Oficyna Wydawnicza Liberton, Warsaw 1996, ISBN 83-900896-7-X.
- Porozmawiajmy spokojnie o... księżach, Oficyna Wydawnicza Liberton, Warsaw 1997, ISBN 83-900896-8-8.
- Porozmawiajmy spokojnie o tych sprawach, Oficyna Wydawnicza Liberton, Warsaw 1998, ISBN 83-910699-0-7.
- Porozmawiajmy spokojnie o... starości, Oficyna Wydawnicza Liberton, Warsaw 1998, ISBN 83-900896-9-6.
- Bóg dobry aż tak? O Bożym miłosierdziu myśli kilka, Oficyna Wydawnicza Liberton, Warsaw 2000.
- Kazania radiowe 1992–2002, Oficyna Wydawnicza Liberton, Warsaw 2002.
- Kazania radiowe 2003–2009, Oficyna Wydawnicza Liberton, 2011, ISBN 978-83-9106-999-8.
- Po co bierzmowanie?, Oficyna Wydawnicza Liberton, Warsaw 2003, ISBN 978-83-910699-7-4.
- Aleksander Fedorowicz. Po prostu ksiądz, Wydawnictwo Sióstr Loretanek, Warsaw 2008, ISBN 978-83-7257-316-2.
- Rozważanie Drogi Krzyżowej. Trzy homilie na uroczystość Zmartwychwstania Pańskiego, ISBN 978-83-910699-8-1.
- Katechizm poręczny, Wydawnictwo Sióstr Loretanek, Warsaw 2016, ISBN 978-83-725-7738-2.
- Katechizm poręczny 2, Wydawnictwo Sióstr Loretanek, Warsaw 2017.
- Czarny humor czyli o kościele na wesoło, co-author: Bogusław Kowalski, Wydawnictwo RTCK, Nowy Sącz 2017, ISBN 978-83-65927-00-2.
- Wstań – Albo będziesz święty, albo będziesz nikim, Wydawnictwo Znak, Kraków 2018, ISBN 978-83-240-5447-3, (available on CD, 2016, ISBN 978-83-64855-53-5).
- Seks – poezja czy rzemiosło, Wydawnictwo 2ryby.pl, Wrocław 2019, ISBN 978-83-951549-2-8, (available on CD, 2015).
- Ty jesteś marką, Wydawnictwo RTCK, Nowy Sącz 2019, ISBN 9788365927972.
- Eucharystia (series: Droga do nieba), Wydawnictwo Sióstr Loretanek, Warsaw 2020, ISBN 978-83-7257-989-8.
- Chrzest (series: Droga do nieba), Wydawnictwo Sióstr Loretanek, Warsaw 2020, ISBN 978-83-7257-998-0.
- Sakrament pokuty i pojednania (series: Droga do nieba), Wydawnictwo Sióstr Loretanek, Warsaw 2020, ISBN 978-83-7257-987-4.
- Bierzmowanie (series: Droga do nieba), Wydawnictwo Sióstr Loretanek, Warsaw 2020, ISBN 978-83-7257-988-1.
- Księża na Księżyc! Tylko co dalej, Wydawnictwo Znak, Kraków 2020, ISBN 978-83-240-6035-1.
