= Piotr Paziński =

Piotr Paziński may refer to:

- Piotr Paziński (writer) (born 1973), Polish writer
- Piotr Paziński (taekwondo) (born 1987), Polish taekwondo athlete
