= Ecohydraulics =

Interdisciplinary research field

Ecohydraulics is an interdisciplinary science studying the hydrodynamic factors that affect the survival and reproduction of aquatic organisms and the activities of aquatic organisms that affect hydraulics and water quality. Considerations include habitat maintenance or development, habitat-flow interactions, and organism responses. Ecohydraulics assesses the magnitude and timing of flows necessary to maintain a river ecosystem and provides tools to characterize the relation between flow discharge, flow field, and the availability of habitat within a river ecosystem. Based on this relation and insights into the hydraulic conditions optimal for different species or communities, ecohydraulics-modeling predicts how hydraulic conditions in a river change, under different development scenarios, the aquatic habitat of species or ecological communities. Similar considerations also apply to coastal, lake, and marine eco-systems.

In the past century, hydraulic engineers have been challenged by habitat modeling, complicated by lack of knowledge regarding ecohydraulics. Since the 1990s, especially after the first International Symposium on Ecohydraulics in 1994, ecohydraulics has developed rapidly, mainly to assess the impacts of human-induced changes of water flow and sediment conditions in river ecosystems...

Ecohydraulics analyzes, models, and seeks to mitigate the adverse impacts of changes in hydraulic characteristics caused by dam construction and other human activities, on the suitability of habitat for organisms, such as fish and invertebrates, and to predict changes in biological communities and biodiversity. Many articles report research findings about fluvial ecohydraulics. For example, the International Association for Hydro-Environment Engineering and Research (IAHR) and Taylor & Francis have been publishing the Journal of Ecohydraulics since 2016. The journal spans all topics in natural and applied ecohydraulics in all environmental settings.

== Key Concepts ==
An aquatic ecosystem is defined as a community of aquatic organisms, with the species dependent on each other and on their physical-chemical environment and linked through flows of energy and materials. The distribution patterns of species are affected by the spatial and temporal characteristics of water flow.

Flow velocity affects the delivery of food and nutrients to organisms. It can also dislodge organisms and prevent them from remaining at a site. Some vertebrates and invertebrates, such as the shellfish Corbicula fluminea, filter their food through flowing water. Flow velocity and turbulence are critical to the life activities of many species. For example, some fish migrate and some fish spawn when they detect high flows. However, extremely high flow velocity, or high intensities of turbulence, created by hydraulic engineering infrastructure can exert pressure on most fish and invertebrates and even kill them. When the flow velocity is below 0.1 m/s, the biological community in a river is similar to that in a lake. Usually, in rivers, flow velocity between 0.1–1 m/s is most suitable for major-stream fish species.

High flow velocity and turbulence are cues for timing migration and spawning of some fish. Asian carp lay floating eggs when they sense increasing discharge resulting from a spring flood flow. The settling velocity of the eggs varies in the range of 0.7-1.5 cm/s. Once a carp egg settles on the riverbed, the egg cannot hatch. Only if flow velocity exceeds the settling velocity can an egg remain in suspension and complete incubation within 24–40 hours.

Golden mussels (Limnoperna fortune) are an invasive filter-feeding macro-invertebrate species. Dense attachment of the species to the boundaries of water-transfer tunnels and pipelines results in biofouling, causing high resistance to water flow and damage to pipeline walls. This consequence, along with the decay of dead mussels, harm water quality. Golden mussel larvae can be killed by high-frequency turbulence and increased flow velocity. Experiments show that the larvae can be killed in a flow field with velocities in excess of 0.08-0.15 m/s and a turbulence frequency higher than 30 Hz. Preliminary results have shown that the higher the turbulence intensity the higher the mortality of golden mussel larvae. On the other hand, low vertical mixing or turbulence is a key factor in favoring the development of harmful algal blooms.

Reservoirs are operated according to the requirements of power generation, water supply, navigation, and, in recent decades, environmental flows. Thus, the time and magnitude of peak discharge of floods may change, which thereby affect the life cycle and habitat of aquatic bio-communities. Most faunal species in a river cannot adapt to the non-natural change of flow and disappear from the reach downstream of the dam. Fish stranding caused by reservoir operation has occurred downstream of hydropower stations in many countries. A hydro-power dam, such as Fengshuba Dam on the East River, China, releases water suddenly during daytime and shuts off at night to meet an unsteady power demand. The instantaneous fluctuation in flow discharge and velocity kills most species except for those (e.g., the small shrimp, Palaemonidae) that can hide in crevices in riverbed sediment.

Water depth is crucial for large fauna. The habitats created by shallow rapids of small rivers in mountainous areas typically suit invertebrates and small vertebrates. Only mountain streams with many deep pools can have medium-sized creatures such as rainbow trout. White-flag dolphin, Chinese sturgeon, and finless porpoise require the water depths associated with the middle and lower reaches of the Yangtze River, where there is sufficient water depth for them to grow and hide. On the other hand, few animals can live in the lower layers of deep lakes and reservoirs, because of low dissolved-oxygen (DO) concentration.

Temperature is an important factor for many species. Salmon can only survive in cold water rivers. The Mississippi and Yangtze rivers are not suitable for salmon due to high temperatures. However, aquatic insects grow and develop more rapidly in tropical and subtropical rivers than in temperate rivers. Some species may complete two or more generations per year at warmer sites yet only one or fewer at cooler sites. Some dragonfly species on the Tibetan Plateau live for more than ten years in cold water before attaining sexual maturity and eclosion.

Variability of hydraulic characteristics is essential for biodiversity. A wide variety of flow velocities, water depths, and temperatures, both spatial and temporal, are needed to maintain high levels of biodiversity in aquatic ecosystems.

Eutrophication refers to the enrichment of a water body by nutrients to a level that results in algal blooms, deterioration in water quality, and undesirable disruption to the balance of an aquatic ecosystem. Eutrophication and algal blooms occur in rivers, lakes, estuaries, coastal, and marine waters. Algal blooms in lakes and coastal waters may lead to massive fish kills. The onset and the risk of algal blooms are closely related to the hydraulic flow and vertical turbulent mixing processes. This relationship has been shown by a real-time forecasting and warning system established to monitor algal and DO dynamics. Monitoring shows that diurnal DO fluctuations mirror the algal biomass. Algae of high density can increase fluid viscosity by more than 100%. Real-time monitoring and early warning systems can help with adaptive management to mitigate the harmful effects of massive algal blooms.

Emergent vegetation (e.g., reeds and bulrushes) on floodplains and riparian wetlands imposes significant resistance to overbank flow. The resistance of emergent vegetation is so great that the resistance coefficient in the equations of hydraulics requires adjustment. For instance, the Manning's n increases tenfold as flow depth increases from 0.03 to 0.5 m, mainly due to emergent vegetation. Emergent and submerged vegetation change the turbulence structure and sediment transportation, and may cause these quantities to vary with flow velocity over a floodplain.

Aquatic animals may change flow and sediment transportation. Initiation of motion for sediment and transportation are affected by salmonid spawning. Clustering of bed gravel is important to embryo survival of the species. The spawning fish move the riverbed pebbles and bury their eggs underneath and the egg burial depth tends to be just deeper than the observed scour depth. The species has adapted its egg placement strategy to the process of flood scouring. Beavers may construct wood dams across small streams and the beaver dams alter the hydrological process and hydraulic characteristics of a stream. Invasion of Zebra mussels and Golden mussels into pipelines, such as the cooling water pipeline of a hydro-power plant, can block pipelines and hamper power generation.

Habitat is an area where plants or animals normally live, grow, feed, reproduce, and otherwise exist for any portion of their life cycle. Because each species responds differently to environmental and biotic conditions, the term habitat is specific to a species, and in more general terms, specific to guilds of species; for example, 'fish habitat' is specific to fish. Hydraulic attributes are considered to be the most important features of habitat for almost all organisms in rivers. The biological diversity and species abundance in streams depend on the diversity of available habitat. The slope, planform, confinement, and cross-sectional shape and dimensions of a stream, and the grain-size distribution of bed sediment affect aquatic habitat. Under less disturbed situations, a narrow, steep-walled cross section provides less physical area for habitat than does a wide cross section. A steep, confined stream is a high-energy environment that may limit the occurrence, diversity, and stability of habitat.

Substrate is a general term that refers to all material that constitutes a riverbed or stream bed, which in most cases mainly comprise sediment. Stream-bed and bank erosion, sediment transportation, and deposition are among the most important factors that affect aquatic habitat. Stable streams are streams with a stable channel bed, which normally features energy-dissipation structures and little bed-load motion (transport of particles from a bed). Such streams have the best habitat for fish and benthic invertebrates. Incised streams are streams experiencing channel bed erosion, which provide the second-best habitat. Streams with intensive bed-load motion and sedimentation provide bad habitat for organisms. The taxa richness or biodiversity of these different types of rivers varies extremely because of different magnitudes of erosion, sedimentation, and sediment transportation. A uniform sand bed in a stream provides less potential habitat diversity than a bed with a step-pool system, boulder cascades, rapids, pool-riffle sequences, or other types of "bed structures" because of the resting places such feature provide.

Hyporheic zone is a layer of substrate on the riverbed in which benthic animals normally live or exist for any portion of their life cycle. Animals in the hyporheic zone usually are protected from severe washouts and temperature extremes. Other species prefer the stream bed surface for its higher DO concentration, direct contact with flowing water, and high food availability. Macro-invertebrates inhabit a sediment bed layer with a thickness of about 40–55 cm in gravel beds, 60 cm in cobble beds, 10–30 cm in coarse sand beds, and 5–10 cm in fine sand beds. The thickness of the zone in clay and silt beds is about 30 cm because the bed is relatively soft; some macro-invertebrates can move within the fluid mud layer.

Environmental Flows are defined as the quantity, timing, and quality of freshwater flows and levels necessary to sustain aquatic ecosystems which, in turn, support human cultures, economies, sustainable livelihoods, and well-being. The natural flow regime plays a critical role in sustaining native biodiversity and ecosystem integrity in rivers. The concepts and terminology vary across countries，such as minimum flow, environmental flow regime, environmental water, ecological flows. In the 2010s, the assessments of environmental flows at the basin scale have greatly evolved with the application of habitat-based methods or holistic methods, to balance the environmental flows and water uses, e.g. agriculture and hydropower, in the water planning at the watershed or river basin scale. In addition, some methodologies of water planning evaluate performance in river systems including stress tests, which consider the uncertainty associated with climate and global change, and evaluate the feasibility of balancing environmental flows and other water uses. For instance, several irrigation schemes were being considered for development of the Kilombero River Basin, Tanzania. It was determined what quantity of water could be abstracted from the river without degrading the ecological condition.

== Basic Principles and Models ==
High habitat diversity supports high biodiversity. Or stated alternatively, biodiversity depends on habitat diversity, which is defined as the diversity of habitat types suitable for different bio-communities. The physical conditions of stream habitats depend mainly on the following factors: 1) substrate; 2) water depth; and 3) flow velocity. Different physical conditions support different bio-communities, so diversified physical conditions may support diversified bio-communities. Habitats with flow velocity less than 0.3 m/s are suitable for species that swim slowly. Habitats with flow velocity higher than 1 m/s are suitable for species that like high flow velocities. Fish species diversity and richness are strongly related to the combination of the effects of substrate, velocity, and depth, which can be represented by the Habitat Diversity Index. Field investigations have shown that a stream with different substrates is suitable for a large variety of invertebrate species and has a high biodiversity. The species richness, or number of species, S, is proportional to the habitat diversity index.

Cut-off of connections of habitats impairs ecology. Connections of habitats are essential for complex bio-communities and high biodiversity. Cut-off of the connections with artificial dams or locks reduces biodiversity and undermines the bio-communities. Some projects are intended to restore the connections of habitats.

The Yangtze River once connected thousands of riparian lakes in its middle and lower reaches, thereby forming a complex habitat system. Water flowed from the river to the lakes during the rising stage of floods and vice versa during the recession stage of floods. The river had high biodiversity and was home to 400 species of fish, 3 species of whales, and numerous species of amphibians, reptiles, birds, and invertebrates. The connection between the upper reaches and the middle and lower reaches, and the connections between the river and riparian lakes have been cut-off to reduce the cost of levee construction and to promote fish farming, resulting in the fragmentation of the complex habitats. Investigations have shown that cutting the connections has reduced the numbers of macroinvertebrate species by 60% and fish species by 40-50% in the lakes. There are 101 fish species in Poyang Lake, which remains connected to the Yangtze River, but only 57 and 47 fish species in Honghu Lake and Zhangdu Lake, respectively, which have been cut off from the river. Experiments have shown that a substantial reduction in the number of species and the abundance of macro-invertebrates occurs within 4 months after a riparian wetland is isolated from the river.

Resilience refers to an ecosystem's stability and capability to tolerate disturbances and restore itself. The resilience of an eco-system involves both the process and the outcome of successfully adapting to ecological stresses, and the ability to maintain its normal patterns of biomass production after being subjected to damage. If a disturbance were of sufficient magnitude or duration, a threshold may be reached where the ecosystem undergoes a regime shift, possibly permanently. Ecological projects, in some sense, are designed to enhance the resilience of ecosystems, reduce the time required for the ecosystem to return to an equilibrium, and increase the ecosystem's capacity to absorb disturbances and reorganize. A new paradigm in river and coastal management is evolving ecological enhancement, recreation, and aesthetics, as well as complying with strict environmental protection legislation. These complex projects require extensive data and simulation tools to assist decision makers and communities in selecting management strategies which offer the maximum benefits, whilst preserving and enhancing the ecological integrity of the river system.

Models, especially numerical models often are needed. A common approach to habitat studies is to apply numerical hydraulic modeling with the models included in PHABSIM. This approach is based on a one‑dimensional hydraulic characterization of a limited river reach under steady flow conditions. The model was tested to assess its capability to evaluate suitable habitat for Pacific and Atlantic salmon spawning and the results showed that the model works well for this lifestage, as spawning involves adult fish and is tightly coupled with hydrogeomorphology.

Vegetation affects the turbulence intensity and turbulence structure. Modeling of the dynamic process of vegetative succession describes the relation between the hydraulic characteristics of flood disturbances and the colonization and succession processes of vegetation on sediment bars and floodplains. The model is composed of modules for hydraulic, wood, and herbaceous plants, and soil nutrients. The model's hydraulic module simulates the processes of flood inundation, flushing, and sedimentation. The timing and locations of plant recruitment use the characteristics of a flood. The mortality of plants at each location during a flood is estimated from surface erosion rates obtained from a hydrodynamic model.

The gap between the existing model technology and the requirements of modeling the whole aquatic ecosystem on a wide range of spatial and temporal scales requires investigation. Physical habitat models are particularly useful for assessing the impact of hydropower projects, analyzing the effects of water abstraction on river ecology, and determining the minimum flow requirements of aquatic populations.

As mentioned above, hydraulic variables profoundly affect habitat utilization by biota. Fluvial habitat suitability curves have been developed for forty years. Also, habitat suitability models are applied to evaluate the ability of a habitat to support a particular species. Fish behavior has been analyzed in designing microhabitat in a meter-resolution two-dimensional (2D) microhabitat modeling.

Suitability indices are the core for habitat modeling, which may be illustrated for the Chinese sturgeon. The life cycle of the Chinese sturgeon in the Yangtze River mainly comprises spawning, hatching, and maturation. Brood fish seek suitable spawning sites and adhere fertilized eggs to stones, which hatch after about 120 to 150 h. Juvenile sturgeon swim to the East China Sea and stay there until they reach maturity. Ten aquatic eco-factors influence the habitat suitability of the Chinese sturgeon: 1) water temperatures for adults and juveniles (V_{1}, °C); 2) water depth for adults (V_{2}, m); 3) substrate for adults (V_{3}); 4) water temperature for spawning (V_{4}, °C); 5) water depth for spawning (V_{5}, m); 6) substrate for spawning and hatching (V_{6}); 7) water temperature during hatching (V_{7}, °C); 8) flow velocity during spawning (V_{8}, m/s); 9) suspended sediment concentration during spawning (V_{9}, mg/L); and 10) the ratio of estimated brood sturgeon to eggs-predatory fish (V_{10}). The ratio, V_{10}, is important because 90% of eggs suffer predation. The Habitat Suitability Index (HSI) is given by as

$HSI=\min\{\min\bigl(V_1,V_2,V_3),\min(V_4,V_5,V_6),V_10\min(V_6,V_7,V_8,V_9)\}$

Figure 1 shows suitability curves for the ten eco-factors. Using these curves, the Habitat Suitability Index (HSI) was calculated, in which the velocity, depth, temperature, and substrate were estimated using a two-dimensional model of hydraulics and sediment movement. The habitat suitability HSI ranges from 0 (unsuitable) to 1 (optimal). Yi et al. indicated that the space and time suitable for spawning were reduced after the completion of the Three Gorges Dam in 2003. The model proved that reservoir operation revised to mimic the natural flow regime would enhance habitat suitability.

== Applications ==
Construction of dams has caused insurmountable obstacles to migratory fish. At least 1/5 of the world's 9000 species of freshwater fish have disappeared due to dams. This proportion is even higher in rivers with more dams, which is 2/5 in the United States and 3/4 in Germany. More than 130 dams have been built on the Columbia River and its tributaries, blocking salmon spawning upstream, resulting in a fishery loss of $6.5 billion between 1960 and 1980.

A fish ladder is designed to help the migrating fish and brood fish to cross a dam to the upstream spawning ground, and a fish pass helps the juvenile fish to cross the dam to the downstream and the sea. Fish ladders and passes can be designed separately or can be combined into one channel. The main concept of fish ladder design is to create extremely high resistance, letting the water from upstream to downstream of the dam flow at a low velocity while maintaining a large depth. The design of the inlet and outlet of the fish ladder is critical. If the downstream outlet velocity is too high, fish cannot swim into the fish ladder. If the outlet flow velocity is too low, the fish cannot determine whether it leads to the upstream spawning ground. Also important is turbulence along a ladder or pass.

The earliest fish ladder was constructed by Denil in 1909. The ladder consists of a series of baffles positioned on the walls and floor of a channel all of which enable the upstream moving brood fish, specifically Atlantic salmon, to bypass weirs and small dams. Generally, a fish ladder maximizes energy dissipation and reduces flow velocity, the shape and position of the baffles create a secondary outward circulation of flow, producing a momentum transfer from the central portion of the channel towards the walls.

Research has been done regarding Denil's fish ladder, focusing mainly on refining the baffles. Additionally, research concentrates on understanding organism response to the hydrodynamics (flow velocity and turbulence) under experimental settings. Attention has been paid to the turbulence intensity, eddy size, and hydrodynamic drag in fishways. On the other hand, fish biologists have worked closely with hydraulic engineers to understand how fish respond to complex fluid dynamics. Humans have created a variety of fish ladders, such as the submerged jet from a vertical gap type, which is suitable for large fish; step-pool type and submerged window type, which is suitable for medium fish; and overflow weir type, which is suitable for small fish (Figure 2).

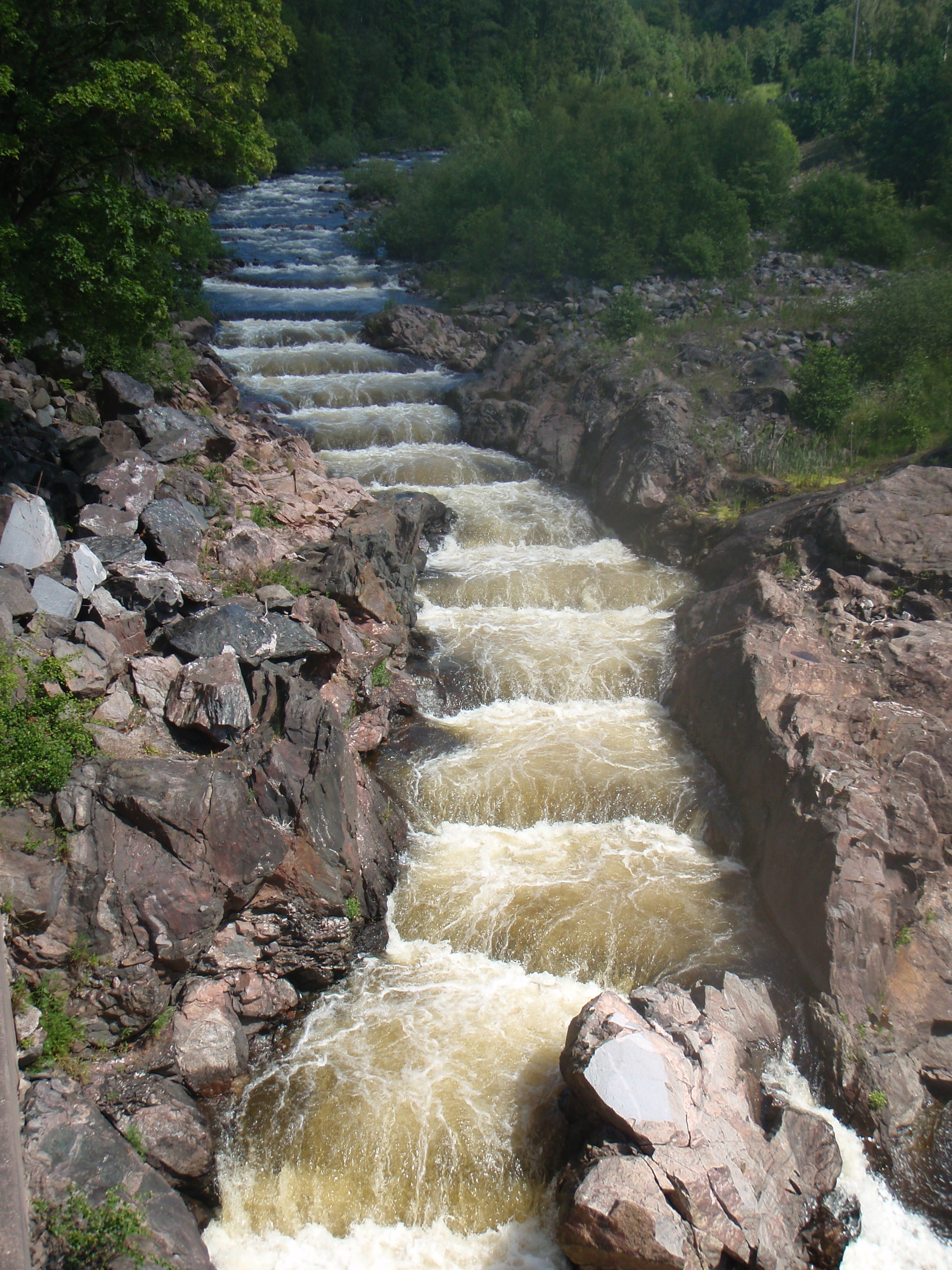

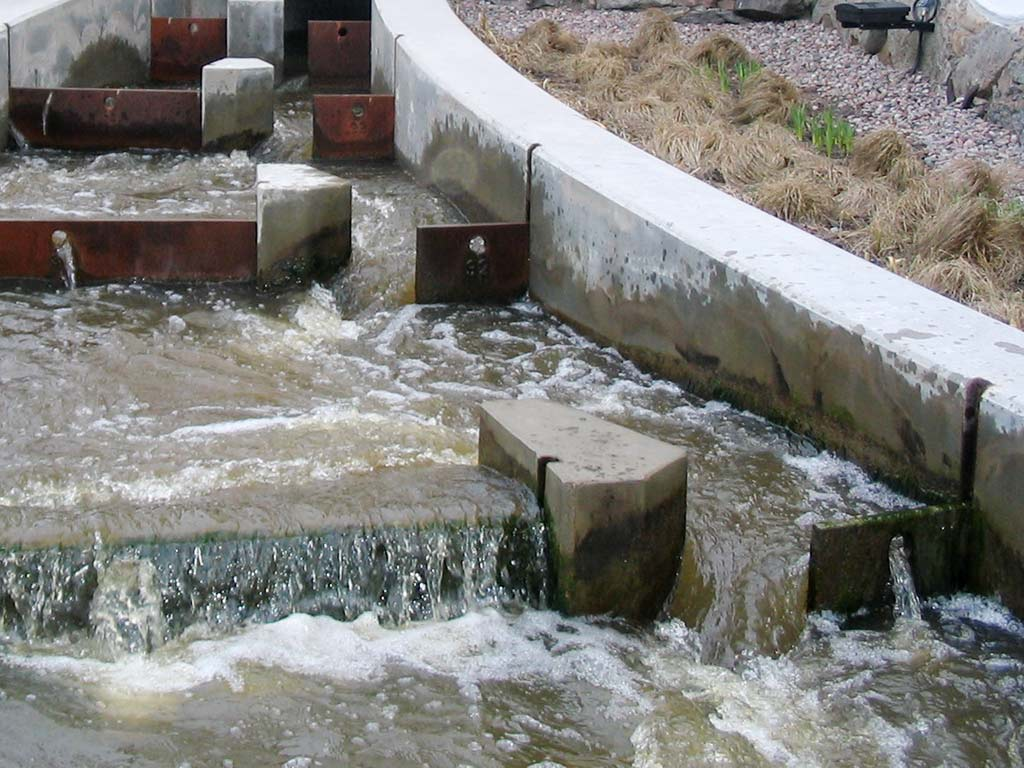

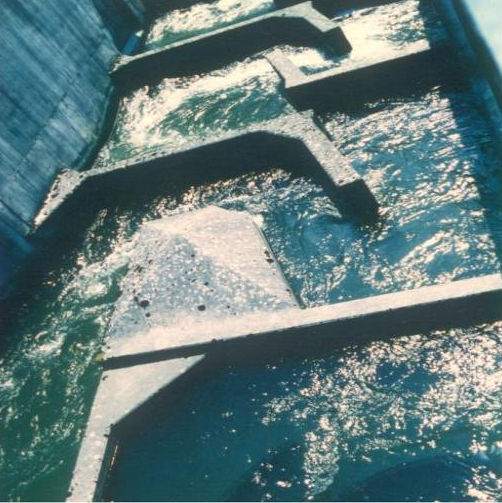

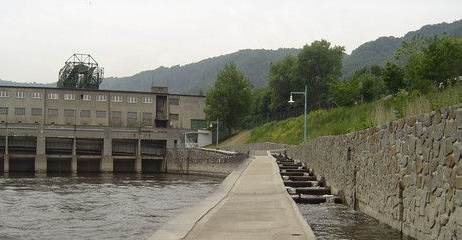

Figure 2 Various types of fish ladder

In 2004, a fish ladder was built for the brood fish to bypass the Itaipu Dam on the Parana River, and for juvenile fish to pass down the river. The maximum flow velocity was less than 3 m/s. At the initial stage, the flow discharge used for trapping fish was 20 m^{3}/s, and when the fish were swimming into the passage channel, the flow discharge dropped to 11.4 m^{3}/s.

The most successful fish passages in the world are the fish ladders and fish passes bypassing the eight dams on the Columbia River. The U.S. government legislates that dams on the Columbia River must be built with a fishway. Bonneville Dam is the most downstream dam on the river, with a height of 60 m. The fish ladder was designed as a series of "cabins" using vertical gap jet diffusion and energy dissipation. Since the 1930s, a yearly average of 721,000 brood fish have crossed the dam and entered an upstream spawning ground.

Reservoir operation: Since 2010, the Three Gorges Reservoir has been operated to promote spawning of the Asian carp. In June 2011, the discharge from the reservoir increased by 2,000 m^{3}/s every day, and the flow velocity and turbulence intensity increased continuously for 5 days. Stimulating flood flow, brood fish gathered downstream and spawned. In 2022, the reservoir increased the discharge from 12,800 m^{3}/s on June 3 to 22,400 m^{3}/s on June 8. The number of drifting eggs spawned by the carps in the Yichang-Yidu section increased by more than 400 million.

Artificial step-pools: In the past decades, artificial step-pools have been applied in mountain rivers to increase the habitat diversity, and thereby improve river ecology in Germany, Italy, the United States, Canada, Switzerland, Austria, and other countries. An experiment done in the Diaoga River in Yunnan, China, proved that artificial step-pools may create stable and diverse habitat with low velocity and deep-water pools and high velocity waterfalls. Thus, different species can find suitable habitat for survival and reproduction. Myriophyllum and Periphyton (forms of algae) grew on the riverbed, and the original white gravel bed was covered with green aquatic plants. The number of species of invertebrates doubled, and the number of individuals per unit area increased by 10 to 85 times. The artificial step-pool system created great resistance to flow and reduced debris-flow problems.

Elsewhere, step-pool systems are used. For example, Germany invested 400,000 Euros to build an artificial step-pool system on the Mangfall River, a tributary of the Inn River. Italy imitated a step-pool system and constructed a group of small dams with boulders, achieving significant results in stabilizing streams and restoring river ecology in northern mountain rivers. Artificial step-pool system constructed on the Kleinschmidt River in Montana and on the Little Snake River in Wyoming restored salmon and rainbow trout habitats.

Wetland restoration: Channelization of the Kissimmee River in central Florida destroyed or degraded most of the fish and wildlife habitat once provided by the river and its floodplain wetlands. A subsequent project restored the river's biological resources from 1984 to 1989. The straight channel was re-meandered, flow velocity was reduced, and water-stage increased. Reintroduction of flow through remnant river channels increased habitat diversity and led to favorable responses by fish and invertebrate communities. The habitat was restored forming a shallow and wide "River of Grass" which flowed slowly across everglades sawgrass toward mangrove estuaries in the Gulf of Mexico

Restoration of habitat connectivity: Restoration of connectivity between habitats that became fragments mainly involves dredging and excavating channels to connect lakes, wetlands, and rivers and creating ecological corridors for aquatic animals. In 2012, the city of Wuhan, China, connected 20 lakes on the left bank of the Yangtze River. A channel with a maximum width of 60 m and a depth of 1.5 m was dug between the lakes. The city built the ecological network of the Great East Lake on the right bank of the Yangtze River, reconnecting six lakes to the river. During the project, pump stations were used to exchange water between the lakes and the river to improve the water quality. The reconnection of the fragmented habitat repaired the damaged ecosystem.

== Case Studies ==
Many examples can be given. A few ensue.

Ecohydraulics for land development: Sand Motor (Netherlands)-Ecohydraulics is increasingly used in the quest for nature-based solutions for sustainable development. A landmark example of building with nature, the "sand motor", was first implemented in the Netherlands in 2011 as a pilot project to provide an alternative solution for depositing a large amount of sand along the shore to nourish the coast and safeguard the hinterland from being eroded. A hook-shaped peninsula of about 21.5 million m^{3} of sand was constructed to protrude 1 km into the sea and cover about 2 km alongshore (Figure 3). By making use of natural processes such as waves, wind and tide to redistribute the sand, this innovative approach succeeded in limiting the disturbance of local ecosystems, while also providing new areas for nature and more types of recreation

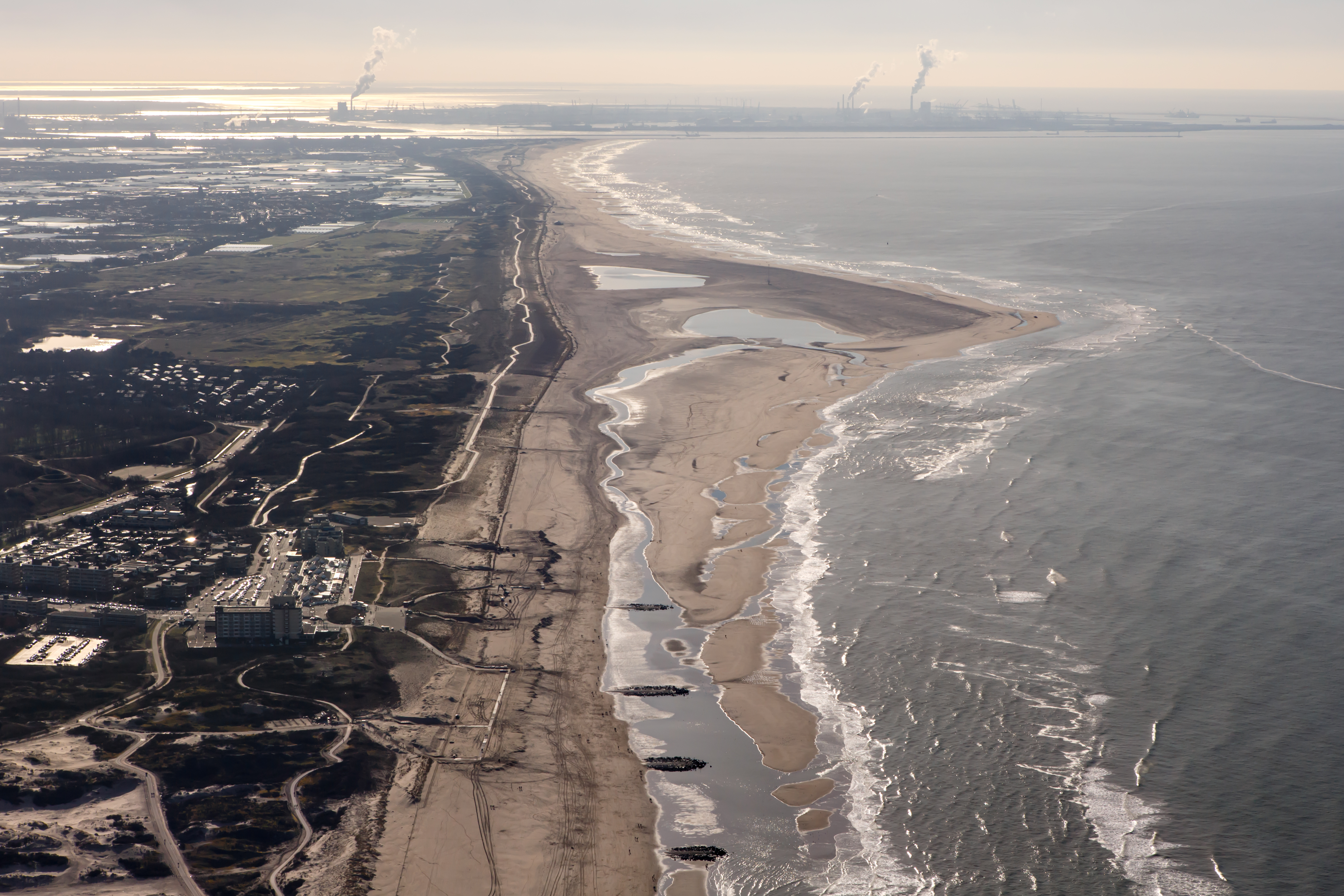

Figure 3 Creating land by natural processes to minimize ecosystem disruption: The Sand Motor after completion in July 2011 (left) and 5 years later in January 2016 (right)

Ecohydraulics for restoring habitat of migratory birds (South Korea)- Nakdong River estuary is regulated by a 2,400-meter-long dam built in 1987 to control the inflow of seawater into farmland and secure drinking and agricultural water for nearby regions, including Busan, Ulsan and South Gyeongsang Province (Figure 4). However, the biodiversity of the river had been diminished since the establishment of the barrage; the stoppage of upstream sea water intrusion limited the supply of brackish water to the rice paddy fields which provided a natural habitat for migratory birds. A controlled partial gate-opening project was started in 2019 to restore and protect the biodiversity of the estuary, and by its third opening in July 2020, improvement was confirmed as the estuary's eco-species, including eels and anchovies, were found again in the waters upstream of the gates. A tidal flat was formed towards the seaside where the sand and mud carried over along the river accumulates provides fertile soil, rendering the area agriculturally rich and the habitat for migratory birds restored.

Other examples of eco-hydraulics can also be found in the IAHR Media Library.

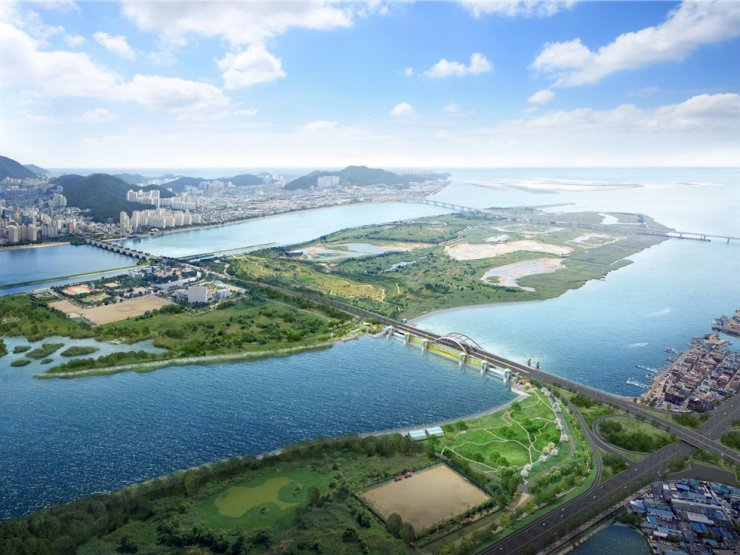

Figure 4 The Nakdong Estuary Dam traps freshwater and prevents salt water from flowing upstream, affecting the rice paddy habitat of migratory birds. Ecological restoration involves opening a small part of the dam using modern eco-hydraulics (Courtesy of K-water)
