= Piotr Naszarkowski =

Polish engraver (born 1952)

Piotr Jerzy Naszarkowski (born 1952) is a Polish engraver, known particularly for his portrait engraving. He has engraved on many supports: book illustrations, banknotes, postage stamps, etc.

Born in 1952 in Warsaw, Poland, he studied at the Academy of Fine Arts, Warsaw. From 1978 to 1980, he worked as stage designer for the Guliwer puppet theatre. He started out working as a scenographer for Polish television, but he quit in 1981 with other artists to protest the proclamation of the martial law after the Solidarność union's strike.

Naszarkowski became an apprentice at the state printers under Barbara Kowalska where he was taught engraving. He was given a full-time job and his first stamp was published in 1985. He also engraved stamps for the Polish Rulers series, which began in 1986, including one of Casimir the Restorer. Because recess printing was going out of fashion, Naszarkowski designed less than 10 stamps during his time at the state printers. He became well-known when his ex-libris Lucas Cranach was printed in Belgium.

In 1989, Naszarkowski moved to Sweden and got a job with the Swedish postal service, initially as an employee but later as a freelancer. His reputation increased and, from 1991, he was designing several stamps a year.

His 99th and 100th stamps were issued September 2005 for the Greta Garbo joint issue between Sweden and the United States.

Naszarkowski was well-known for his portrait engraving and produced stamps of Alva Myrdal, Astrid Lindgren as well as many private studies, including of Ingrid Bergman, Pope John Paul II and fellow Polish engraver Czesław Słania. After Słania's death in 2005, Naszarkowski's portrait was turned into a tribute cinderella stamp and Naszarkowski took on many of Słania's unfinished projects.

In 2017, Cartor was awarded the contract for Sweden's stamp printing, resulting in the end of recess printed stamps and, therefore, Naszarkowski's retirement.
