= Piotr Stoiński =

Piotr Stoiński may refer to:

- Pierre Statorius (1530–1591), or Piotr Stoiński Sr., French grammarian and theologian
- Piotr Stoiński Jr. (1565–1605), his son, Polish Socinian Unitarian writer
