= Piotr Bazler =

Polish footballer

Personal information
- Date of birth: 13 April 1981 (age 45)
- Place of birth: Łódź, Poland
- Height: 1.82 m (6 ft 0 in)
- Position: Midfielder

Youth career
- –1998: ŁKS Łódź

Senior career*
Years	Team	Apps	(Gls)
1998–2001	Widzew Łódź	2	(0)
2002	Pelikan Łowicz		
2002–2003	Ceramika Opoczno	19	(0)
2004	Pelikan Łowicz		
2004	Unia Janikowo		
2005–2006	Drwęca Nowe Miasto Lubawskie	27	(1)
2006–2008	Arka Gdynia	29	(2)
2009	Górnik Łęczna	13	(0)
2010–2014	Dolcan Ząbki	90	(0)
2014–2015	Huragan Wołomin		
2015–2016	Victoria Sulejówek		
2016–2017	Bug Wyszków		
2017–2018	Marcovia Marki		
- * Club domestic league appearances and goals

Piotr Bazler (born 13 April 1981) is a Polish former professional footballer who played as a midfielder.

== Career ==
Bazler began his career in Poland, playing for ŁKS Łódź, Widzew Łódź, Ceramika Opoczno, Unia Janikowo, Drwęca Nowe Miasto Lubawskie and Arka Gdynia.

In summer 2010 he moved to Dolcan Ząbki.
