= Piotr Piekarski =

Piotr Piekarski may refer to:

- Piotr Piekarski (runner) (born 1964), Polish middle distance runner
- Piotr Piekarski (footballer) (born 1993), Polish footballer
