= Piotr Woźniak =

Piotr Woźniak may refer to:

- Piotr Woźniak (geologist) (born 1956), Polish politician
- Piotr Woźniak (researcher) (born 1962), Polish programmer and researcher into memory and learning
