= Piotr Opaliński (diplomat) =

Polish diplomat

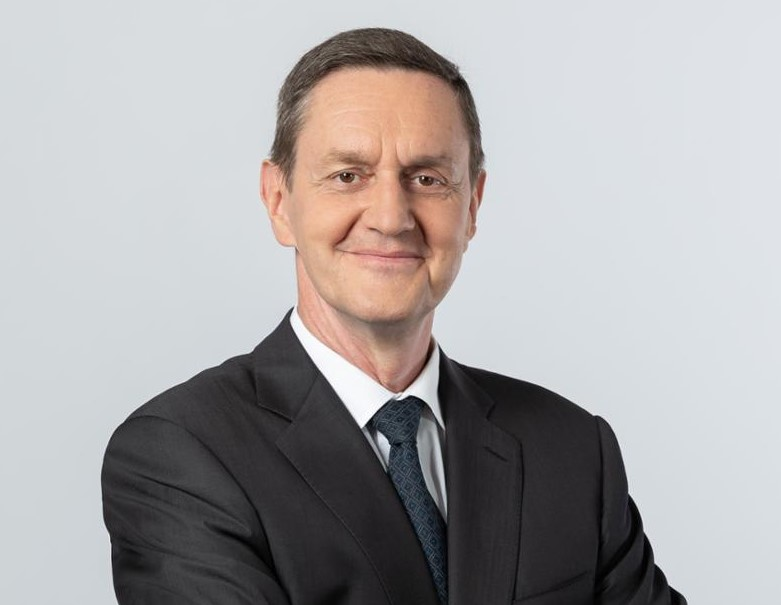

Poland Ambassador to Bangladesh
- In office 1991–1997
- Succeeded by: Jerzy Sadowski

Poland Ambassador to Pakistan
- In office August 2015 – 15 August 2021
- Preceded by: Andrzej Ananicz
- Succeeded by: Maciej Pisarski

Personal details
- Born: 1958 (age 67–68) Warsaw, Poland
- Children: 2 sons
- Education: Tashkent State University
- Profession: Diplomat

Piotr Andrzej Opaliński (born 1958, in Warsaw) is a Polish diplomat, serving as an ambassador to Pakistan (2015–2021).

== Life ==
Piotr Opaliński holds an M.A. in Oriental philology from the Tashkent State University (1985). He has been studying at the Polish Institute of International Affairs (1987), Warsaw, National School of Public Administration, Warsaw, and Netherlands Institute of International Relations Clingendael, The Hague.

Following his scientific work for the University of Warsaw, in 1985, Opaliński joined the Ministry of Foreign Affairs. He has been working there at the Asia, Africa and the Middle East departments. Between 1991 and 1997 he was serving as chargé d'affaires a.i. to Bangladesh. He was working also at the embassies in Luanda, Dar es Salaam (2007), deputy ambassador in Islamabad and Kabul (1999–2005) and deputy head of mission New Delhi (2008–2014). In August 2015, he was appointed ambassador to Pakistan, and presented his credentials on 3 November 2015. He ended his term on 15 August 2021.

Beside Polish, he speaks English, Russian, Hindi, and Urdu. He is an amateur photographer and tennis player.

== Awards ==
- Gold Cross of Merit (2013)
