= Piotr Czerkawski =

Polish film critic and journalist

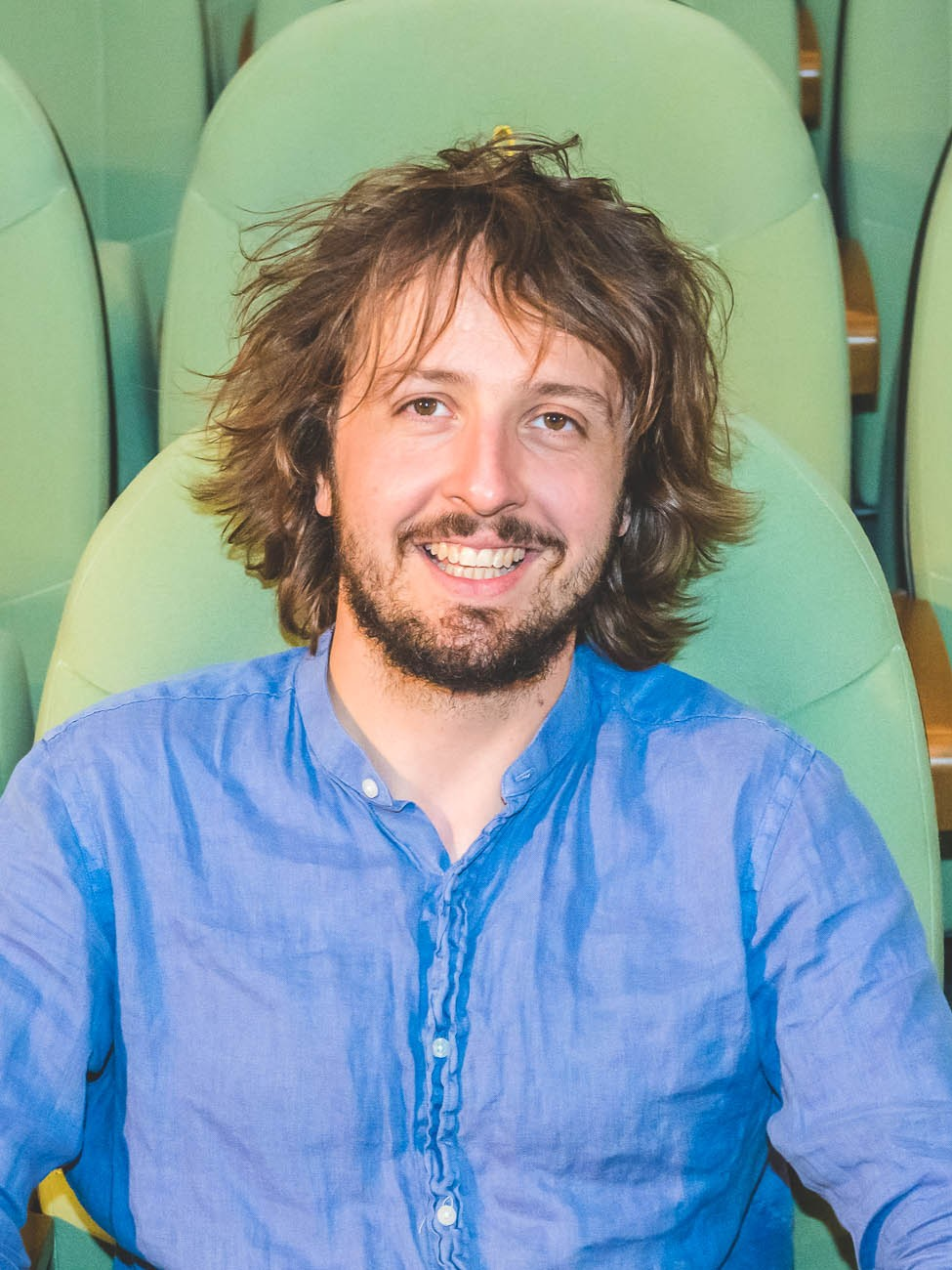
- Piotr Czerkawski (2026)
- Born: September 28, 1989; Wrocław
- Citizenship: Polish
- Education: University of Wrocław
- Occupations: film critic, journalist

Signature
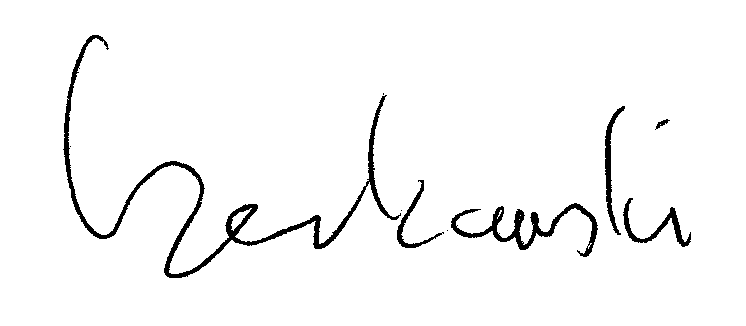

Piotr Czerkawski (Polish: [ˈpjɔtr t͡ʂɛrˈkafskʲi]; born 28 September 1989 in Wrocław) is a Polish film critic and journalist, one of the programme curators of Kino Nowe Horyzonty (New Horizons Cinema) and Shortlist section curator of the New Horizons Film Festival.

== Biography ==
Piotr Czerkawski studied Polish within the Interdisciplinary Studies in the Humanities at the University of Wrocław. He defended his Master's thesis on the role of alcohol in Polish cinema.

He contributed to many magazines in Poland, among them "Kino", "Film", "Dziennik Gazeta Prawna", "Krytyka Polityczna" and "Odra". He also regularly cooperates with the Filmweb.pl website. His essays are being published in his alma mater's academic journal, Studia Filmoznawcze.

From October till December 2015 he was a co-host of the weekly TV program "Weekendowy Magazyn Filmowy" on TVP1. Since 2016, he is a member of the European Film Academy. He is also a member of Polish Filmmakers Association and International Federation of Film Critics (FIPRESCI).

In 2019, the Czarne publishing house released his book Drżące kadry. Rozmowy o życiu filmowym w PRL-u (Shivering Frames. Discussions about Film Life in the Polish People’s Republic). The book contains interviews with famous Polish film directors that were active in communist times.

== Awards ==
In 2017, he won the third place in the Contest for Krzysztof Mętrak Prize for young film critics. In the same year, he received the Polish Film Institute Award in the category "Film criticism".
