= Piotr Romke =

Polish footballer

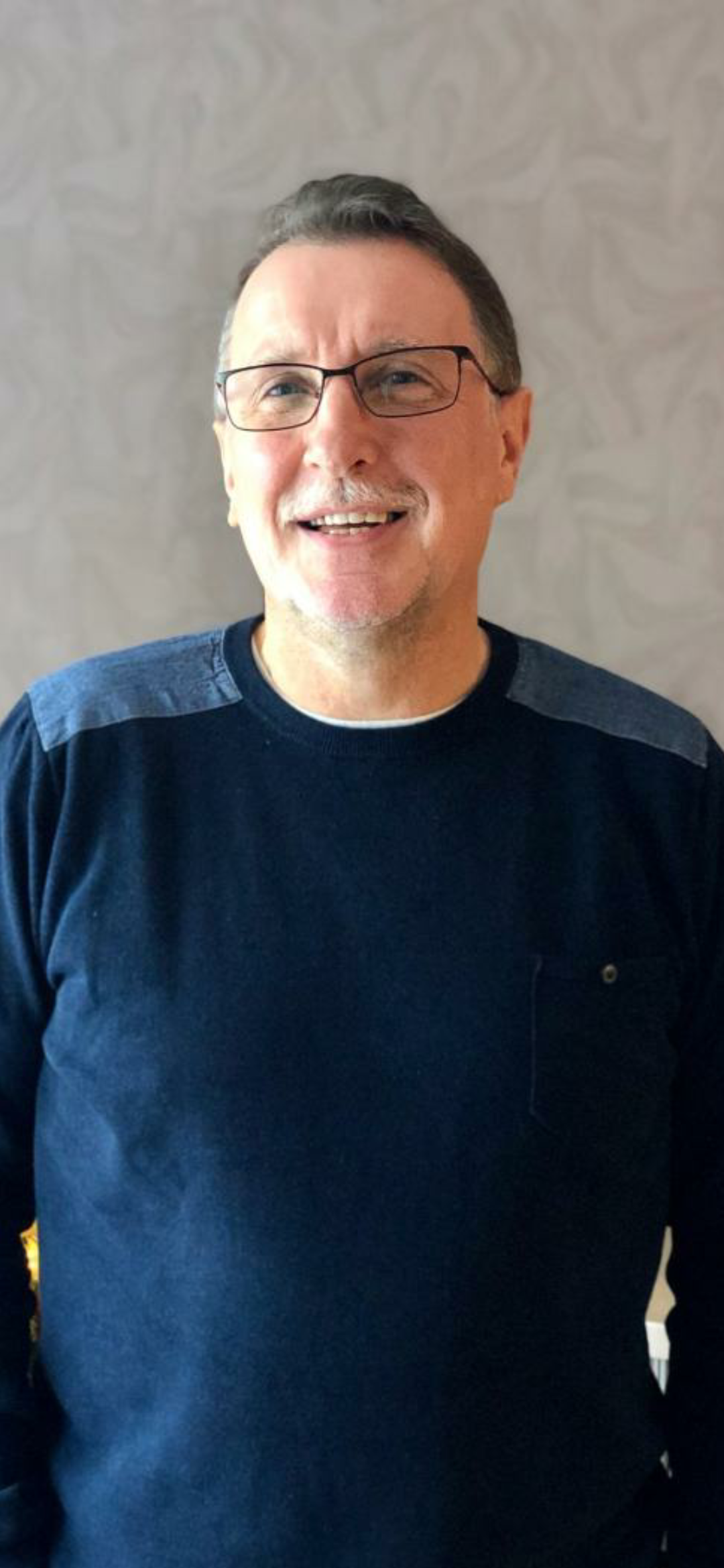

Personal information
- Date of birth: 24 November 1959 (age 66)
- Place of birth: Kalisz, Poland
- Height: 1.77 m (5 ft 10 in)
- Position: Midfielder

Senior career*
Years	Team	Apps	(Gls)
1977–1979	Włókniarz Kalisz		
1979–1985	Widzew Łódź		
1985–1989	Lech Poznań	82	(4)
1989–1991	US Maubeuge		

Managerial career
- 2013: KKS 1925 Kalisz
- * Club domestic league appearances and goals

Piotr Romke (born 24 November 1959) is a Polish former professional footballer who played as a midfielder.

== Honours ==
Widzew Łódź

- Ekstraklasa: 1980–81, 1981–82
- Polish Cup: 1984–85

Lech Poznań

- Polish Cup: 1987–88
