= Piotr Drzewiecki =

Piotr Drzewiecki can refer to:

- Piotr Drzewiecki (footballer)
- Piotr Drzewiecki (mayor)
