= Piotr Robakowski =

Polish footballer

Personal information
- Full name: Piotr Robakowski
- Date of birth: 1 May 1990 (age 36)
- Place of birth: Wejherowo, Poland
- Height: 1.83 m (6 ft 0 in)
- Position: Defender

Youth career
- Arka Gdynia

Senior career*
Years	Team	Apps	(Gls)
2008–2014	Arka Gdynia (ME)	61	(1)
2010–2014	Arka Gdynia	3	(0)
2014	Radomiak Radom	4	(0)
2014–2015	Gwardia Koszalin	5	(0)
2015–2018	GKS Przodkowo	60	(1)
- * Club domestic league appearances and goals

Piotr Robakowski (born 1 May 1990) is a Polish former professional footballer who played as a defender.
