= Piotr Myszkowski =

Piotr Myszkowski can refer to:

- Piotr Myszkowski (bishop) (c. 1510 – 1591), 16th century Roman Catholic Bishop of Plock and Kraków, in Poland
- Piotr Myszkowski (hetman) (c. 1450 – 1505), Polish magnate and military commander
