= Piotr Dominiak =

Polish economist

- Born: 29 June 1948 (age 78); Radom, Poland
- Citizenship: Polish
- Education: Gdańsk University of Technology
- Awards: Ribbon
- Scientific career
- Fields: Economics of small and medium-sized enterprises.

Piotr Jan Dominiak (born in Radom, Poland, 29 June 1948) is a Polish economist, full professor of Gdańsk University of Technology. Vice-rector since 2016.

== Career ==
Piotr Dominiak graduated in Economy at the University of Warsaw (1971), where he also obtained his doctorate (1976) and habilitation (1989). He received the title of Professor in 2005. He has been working at Gdańsk University of Technology since 1971. 1991-1993 director of the Institute of Economic Sciences and Humanities at Gdańsk University of Technology (GUT). Dean of the Faculty of Management and Economics at GUT 1993-1999 and 2005–2012, Head of the Department of Economic Sciences at GUT 1999-2000 and 2014–2016. Vice-Rector for Internationalisation and Innovation of Gdańsk University of Technology since 1 September 2016.

== Research interests and positions ==
Main field of interest is the economics of small and medium-sized enterprises. The author of about 100 scientific publications. Piotr Dominiak headed the four editions of the Pomeranian Economic Observatory. The initiator of English-language studies and of foreign student recruitment for the Faculty of Management and Economics at GUT. Previously a member of the Economics Committee of the Polish Academy of Sciences (2007–2012), expert (2005–2008) and member of the National Accreditation Commission (2008–2011), member of the board of the Gdańsk Branch of the Polish Economic Society. Currently a member of the Scientific Research Centre of the Polish Agency for Enterprise Development, of the Council of the Historical Museum of Gdansk, of the team of advisors for "Pomerania Employers", and of the Council "Study of conditions and directions of spatial development of the city of Gdansk."

Author of approximately 200 journalistic articles and more than 1,000 columns "Cruises on the economy" in "Dziennik Bałtycki". Member of the Rotary Club of Gdańsk-Sopot-Gdynia. Since 2000 has been organising the competitions for the Prize of Małgorzata Dominiak for the best biology students from the province of Pomerania.

== Awards ==
Winner of two awards of the Department of Social Economy and Public Benefit, two awards of the Ministry of Science and Higher Education, several prizes of the Rector GUT. He was awarded the Gold Cross of Merit, Medal of the Commission of National Education, the Gold Medal of the Polish Economic Society, Medal of "Solidarity", the Medal "Rebels at the Gdańsk University of Technology 1945-1989", Medal of Paul Harris Fellow.
