= Piotr Gurzęda =

Polish footballer

Personal information
- Date of birth: 23 February 1987 (age 39)
- Place of birth: Giżycko, Poland
- Height: 1.97 m (6 ft 5 1/2 in)
- Position: Defender

Team information
- Current team: DKS Dobre Miasto (player-assistant)
- Number: 24

Senior career*
Years	Team	Apps	(Gls)
2004–2006	Narew Ostrołęka	1	(0)
2006–2010	Świt Nowy Dwór Mazowiecki	94	(9)
2011–2012	Shinnik Yaroslavl	16	(0)
2012–2013	Oulun Palloseura	23	(1)
2014	Legionovia Legionowo	8	(2)
2015	Znicz Pruszków	9	(0)
2015–2016	Świt Nowy Dwór Mazowiecki	33	(2)
2016–2017	Radomiak Radom	21	(0)
2018–2023	Escola Varsovia Warsaw	78	(5)
2026–	DKS Dobre Miasto	0	(0)

Managerial career
- 2018–2023: Escola Varsovia Warsaw (youth)
- 2023: Stomil Olsztyn U17
- 2023–2024: Stomil Olsztyn II
- 2024–2025: Stomil Olsztyn
- * Club domestic league appearances and goals as of 23:57, 28 February 2026 (UTC)

Piotr Gurzęda (born 23 February 1987) is a Polish professional football manager and player who plays as a defender for IV liga Warmia-Masuria club DKS Dobre Miasto, where he also serves as an assistant coach. He was previously in charge of Stomil Olsztyn.

He made his debut in the Russian First Division for Shinnik Yaroslavl on 4 April 2011 in a game against Khimki.

On 18 August 2012, Gurzęda joined Oulun Palloseura in the Finnish second tier Ykkönen.

== Managerial statistics ==
As of match played 30 August 2025

Managerial record by team and tenure
Team	From	To	Record							
Team	From	To	G	W	D	L	GF	GA	GD	Win %
Stomil Olsztyn II	9 December 2023	23 September 2024	27	11	8	8	53	54	−1	40.74
Stomil Olsztyn	23 September 2024	1 September 2025	34	13	9	12	71	46	+25	38.24
Total			61	24	17	20	124	90	+34	39.34

== Honours ==
Świt Nowy Dwór Mazowiecki

- III liga Łódź–Masovia: 2008–09

Escola Varsovia Warsaw

- Regional league Warsaw I: 2019–20
