= Piotr Nguyen =

Polish chess player (born 1991)

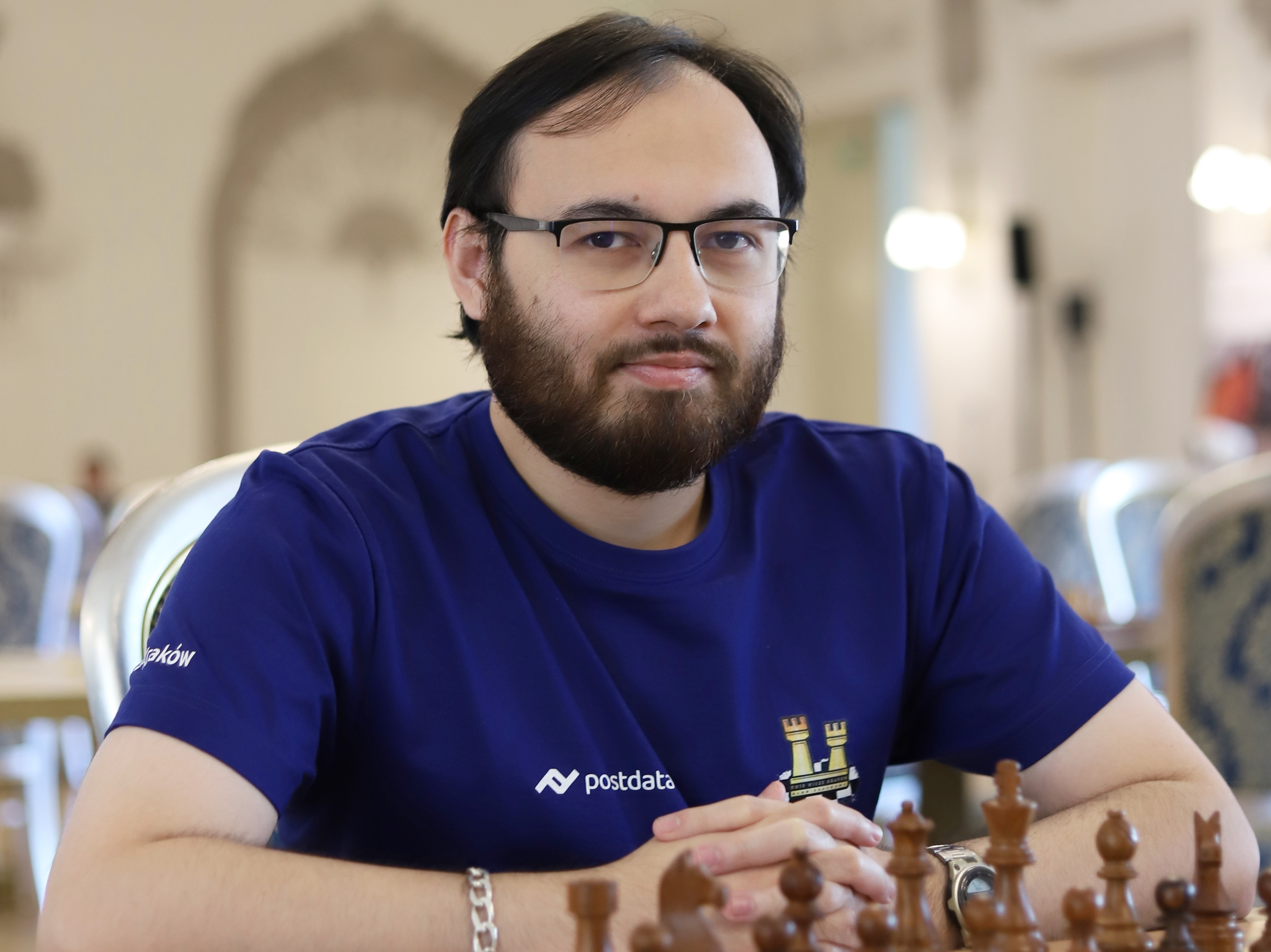

Personal information
- Born: July 18, 1991 (age 35) Tomaszów Lubelski, Poland

Chess career
- Country: Poland
- Title: International Master (2016)
- Peak rating: 2453 (May 2017)

Piotr An Nguyen is a Polish chess player.

== Chess career ==
In 2005, he won the Polish Junior Rapid Chess Championship in Koszalin. He also tied for first place with Maciej Kukla in the U14 section of the National Youth Olympiad.

In September 2008, he won the Open A section of the Warsaw Chess Championship, defeating Michal Motyka on tiebreak scores.
