= Piotr Koman =

Polish footballer

Personal information
- Full name: Piotr Koman
- Date of birth: 25 June 1985 (age 41)
- Place of birth: Wadowice, Poland
- Height: 1.83 m (6 ft 0 in)
- Position: Midfielder

Youth career
- Halny Andrychów
- SMS Bielsko-Biała

Senior career*
Years	Team	Apps	(Gls)
2000–2002	BBTS Bielsko-Biała		
2002–2013	Podbeskidzie Bielsko-Biała	146	(6)
2009–2010	→ Pogoń Szczecin (loan)	30	(2)
2013	Okocimski KS Brzesko	15	(2)
2013–2014	Pelikan Łowicz	29	(7)
2014–2015	Nadwiślan Góra	17	(1)
2015	Limanovia Limanowa	11	(0)
- * Club domestic league appearances and goals

Piotr Koman (born 25 June 1985) is a Polish former professional footballer who played as a midfielder.

== Career ==
=== Club ===
In February 2009, he was loaned to Pogoń Szczecin where he spent one-and-a-half year. He returned to Podbeskidzie in June 2010.
