= Piotr Szczechowicz =

Polish football manager

Personal information
- Date of birth: 20 February 1976 (age 50)
- Place of birth: Pruszków, Poland
- Position: Defender

Youth career
- Ursus Warsaw

Senior career*
Years	Team	Apps	(Gls)
- Ursus Warsaw
- Dolcan Ząbki
- AZS AWF Warsaw
- Pogoń Grodzisk Mazowiecki

Managerial career
- Ursus Warsaw
- 2006–2008: Dolcan Ząbki
- 2008: Wisła Płock (assistant)
- 2008–2009: Wisła Płock
- 2009: Wisła Płock (assistant)
- Targówek Warsaw
- 2011–2013: Pogoń Siedlce
- 2014: Polonia Warsaw
- 2015: Pogoń Siedlce
- 2017: Dolcan Ząbki
- 2019–2021: Drukarz Warsaw (youth)
- 2022–2024: KS Łomianki
- 2024: Marcovia Marki
- * Club domestic league appearances and goals

Piotr Szczechowicz (born 20 June 1976) is a Polish professional football manager and former player who played as a defender. He was most recently in charge of Marcovia Marki.

== Honours ==
=== Manager ===
KS Łomianki

- Regional league Warsaw I: 2023–24
