= Piotr Pierzchała =

Polish footballer (born 1999)

Personal information
- Full name: Piotr Pierzchała
- Date of birth: 9 June 1999 (age 27)
- Place of birth: Kielce, Poland
- Height: 1.90 m (6 ft 3 in)
- Position: Defender

Team information
- Current team: Moravia Morawica
- Number: 4

Youth career
- KKP Korona Kielce
- 2015–2017: Korona Kielce

Senior career*
| Years | Team | Apps | (Gls) |
| 2017–2020 | Korona Kielce II | 34 | (10) |
| 2018–2022 | Korona Kielce | 7 | (0) |
| 2020–2021 | → Pogoń Siedlce (loan) | 22 | (4) |
| 2021–2022 | → Wigry Suwałki (loan) | 17 | (2) |
| 2022 | → Podhale Nowy Targ (loan) | 12 | (0) |
| 2023–2024 | Gwardia Koszalin | 20 | (0) |
| 2024–2025 | Łysica Bodzentyn | 17 | (4) |
| 2025– | Moravia Morawica | 24 | (1) |
- * Club domestic league appearances and goals as of 12:55, 26 June 2026 (UTC)

Piotr Pierzchała (born 29 June 1999) is a Polish professional footballer who plays as a defender for III liga club Moravia Morawica.

== Club career ==
On 24 August 2020, he joined Pogoń Siedlce on a season-long loan.

== Honours ==
Korona Kielce II

- IV liga Świętokrzyskie: 2018–19
