= Piotr Zawojski =

Polish media expert and professor

Dr. hab. Piotr Zawojski (born 1963) is a Polish media expert. He is a tenured professor in the Department of Film and Media Studies at the University of Silesia (Polish: Uniwersytet Śląski) in Katowice, Poland.

== Career ==
Zawojski teaches history and theory of film and television, communication, digital photography, new media and cyberculture, specialising in academic critique of modern film and of audio-visual culture, photography and cyberculture. He is a guest lecturer at the Academy of Fine Arts and Jagiellonian University, both in Kraków. He also frequently offers courses at the Krzysztof Kieślowski Radio and Television Faculty at the University of Silesia in Katowice. Outside of teaching, he is heavily involved in youth and adult educational programs, including the Cult Film Festival in Katowice. He has also served as an artistic director of digital_ia, an annual digital art festival in Poland. He previously created and edited policy for television programming, viewing as well as monitoring analysis for the terrestrial national television carrier TVP.

Zawojski is a head editor of Opcje magazine and serves on the programming board for CyberEmpathy magazine. He has published numerous works in Central European journals including: Studia Filmoznawcze, the Institute of Art of the Polish Academy of Sciences' Kwartalnik Filmowy, Sztuka i Filozofia, Postscriptum, the National Center for Culture's quarterly Kultura Współczesna, the Polish Academy of Sciences' annual Rocznik Historii Sztuki, Przegląd Kulturoznawczy, Format, Zeszyty Telewizyjne, Zeszyty Artystyczne and Art Inquiry. He has co-authored numerous academic papers. He also frequently contributes to regional publications such as Ekran, Kino, artPapier and Świat Obrazu.

Zawojski has received several local and national awards and is a member of the International Association for Aesthetics and International Association of Art Critics (AICA).

== Selected bibliography ==
- 2000: Elektroniczane obrazoświaty. Między sztuką a technologią (Electronic Imageworlds. Between Art and Technology)
- 2002: Wiek ekranów. Przestrzenie kultury widzenia (A Century of Screen. Physical spaces associated with the Viewing Culture) - as co-editor
- 2004: Für eine Philosophie der Fotografie (Towards a Philosophy of Photography) by Vilém Flusser - as science editor and the introduction author
- 2007: Wielkie filmy przełomu wieków. Subiektywny przewodnik (Great Films at the Centuries Turn. A Subjective Guidebook)
- 2010: Cyberkultura. Syntopia sztuki, nauki i technologii (Cyberculture. Syntopy of art, science and technology)
- 2010: Digitalne dotknięcia. Teoria w praktyce/Praktyka w teorii (Digital Touch. A Theory in Practice/A Practice in Theory) - as editor
- 2012: Sztuka obrazu i obrazowania w epoce nowych mediów (Art of Image and Imaging in the Era of New Media)
