= Piotr Wójcik (photojournalist) =

Polish photojournalist and documentary photographer (born 1967)

- Born: 1967 (age 58–59)
- Occupations: Photojournalist, documentary photographer, curator, academic
- Known for: Documentary photography on Roma communities, political and social change in Poland
- Awards: Knight's Cross of the Order of Polonia Restituta (2014)
- Website: piotrwojcikphotodoc.com

Piotr Wójcik (born 1967) is a Polish photojournalist, documentary photographer, exhibition curator and university lecturer. He worked as a photojournalist for the daily Gazeta Wyborcza from 1989 to 2011 and headed its photography department from 2001 to 2011. Since leaving the newspaper he has worked as an independent photographer, and he is president of the Picture Doc Foundation (Fundacja Picture Doc) in Warsaw.

His work concentrates on long-term documentary projects, chiefly on Roma communities in Europe, on social and political change in Poland after 1989, and on the rule of law. He received the Knight's Cross of the Order of Polonia Restituta in 2014 for his activity in the Polish democratic opposition, and second prize in the Single – Current Events category of Grand Press Photo in 2022.

== Early life and education ==
Piotr Wójcik was born in 1967 and lives and works in Warsaw. He studied at the Academy of Catholic Theology in Warsaw, where his field was church history.

Before 1989 he was involved in the Polish underground publishing movement, distributing clandestine publications, working as a printer for the samizdat publishing house Krąg and as a photographer for the underground weekly Przegląd Wiadomości Agencyjnych.

== Career ==
=== Gazeta Wyborcza ===
Piotr Wójcik joined Gazeta Wyborcza as a photojournalist in 1989, the year the paper was founded, and documented the political and social events of Poland's post-communist transition. He published more than thirty photo essays in the paper, many of them in Magazyn Gazety Wyborczej, and from 2001 to 2011 he was head of its photography department. Between 1996 and 2009 he was involved in editing the newspaper's photography albums, published in the series Fotografie Gazety Wyborczej.

In 2009 he was one of three curators, with Dominique Roynette and Joanna Kinowska, of Ludzie, wydarzenia, przemiany – 20 lat fotografii "Gazety Wyborczej" ("People, Events, Transformations – 20 Years of Gazeta Wyborcza Photography") at Zachęta – National Gallery of Art in Warsaw, an exhibition drawing on the work of more than 200 photographers.

=== Independent work ===
After leaving Gazeta Wyborcza in 2011 Wójcik worked as an independent photographer, concentrating on long-term documentary projects while continuing to cover current political and social events. He also produced video reportage, published among others by Gazeta Wyborcza and the French news portal Mediapart. He co-founded the Picture Doc Foundation with Dominique Roynette; the foundation produces documentary projects and promotes photojournalism.

=== Teaching ===
Piotr Wójcik taught photojournalism at the Leon Schiller National Film, Television and Theatre School in Łódź and has taught at the Faculty of Journalism, Information and Bibliology of the University of Warsaw. He has also led workshops for journalists on reporting about Roma communities, including at the POLIN Museum of the History of Polish Jews.

== Work ==
=== Roma communities ===
Piotr Wójcik began documenting the life of Roma communities in Europe in the early 1990s, photographing in Poland, the Czech Republic, Slovakia, Hungary, Romania, Bulgaria, North Macedonia and France. His 1996 project Gypsies. Warsaw–Bucharest was shown as an exhibition at eight Polish railway stations. The photographs were collected in the 2000 album Cyganie z obu stron Karpat ("Gypsies from Both Sides of the Carpathians"), which combined 84 colour reportage photographs with 46 black-and-white portraits of Polish Roma. He was also a co-founder of the Roma cultural quarterly Dialog-Pheniben.

=== Freedom and social change in Poland ===
Polskie wolności ("Polish Freedoms", 2014), made with the reporter Justyna Pobiedzińska and published by the National Centre for Culture, presented portraits of and statements by 25 people of different ages and occupations on what freedom meant to them a quarter of a century after 1989. The project was accompanied by Kontener Wolności ("The Freedom Container"), a mobile exhibition shown in some 25 Polish towns and cities.

The theme was continued in 30/100_PL. 30 Years of Freedom, shown in 2019 at the Museum of Dialogue of Cultures, a branch of the National Museum in Kielce. It combined the earlier 30/Freedom material with Imiennicy. Polska 2018 ("Namesakes. Poland 2018"), a series in which the subjects were chosen on the basis of the most common Polish surnames.

=== Rule of law ===
From the mid-2010s Wójcik documented the resistance of Polish judges, prosecutors and lawyers to changes in the judiciary introduced by the Law and Justice government, including changes at the Constitutional Tribunal, the Supreme Court and the public prosecutor's office. The resulting project, Sprawiedliwość ("Justice"), consists of 32 photographs and accompanying texts portraying 27 jurists, made largely in 2020 and 2021.

The exhibition was first shown in Germany by the Stiftung Forum Recht in Karlsruhe and Leipzig from February to April 2024, in cooperation with the Picture Doc Foundation. It was subsequently presented at the Ministry of Justice of North Rhine-Westphalia in Düsseldorf from July 2024, opened by justice minister Benjamin Limbach, and at the Baukunstarchiv NRW in Dortmund in early 2025.

=== Other projects ===
Bytom Karb (2012), on economic and social change in Upper Silesia, was shown as part of the Erinnerung an Arbeit ("Memory of Work") exhibition in Essen and Katowice. Katowice 150+1 followed in 2015. To be Able to Fall Asleep Peacefully, on Belarusian political refugees living in Poland, combined reportage photographs with written accounts by the subjects and was shown in 2024 in Warsaw, Białystok, Badów Górny and Wrocław.

In 2025 his photographs and films were used in Stan rzeczy – osiem lat i więcej ("The State of Affairs – Eight Years and More"), an audiovisual assemblage for instrumental ensemble, electronics and projections by the composer Jerzy Kornowicz, premiered at Komuna Warszawa.

== Publications ==
- Cyganie z obu stron Karpat. Warsaw: Agora / Twój Styl, 2000. ISBN 83-7163-203-7
- Piotr Wójcik, Justyna Pobiedzińska: Polskie wolności. Warsaw: Narodowe Centrum Kultury, 2014. ISBN 978-83-7982-028-3
- Sprawiedliwość. Warsaw: Fundacja Picture Doc.

He was also editor of the album 1996. Fotografie Gazety Wyborczej (1997) and contributed photographs to it.

== Awards and honours ==
- 2014 – Knight's Cross of the Order of Polonia Restituta, for services to democratic change in Poland
- 2022 – second prize, Single – Current Events, Grand Press Photo, for a photograph of refugees from Ukraine arriving at Przemyśl station on 27 February 2022

== Memberships ==
Wójcik was admitted to the Union of Polish Art Photographers (ZPAF) by its Artistic Council on 11 December 2019 and is a full member of its Warsaw District.
