= List of foreign Ekstraklasa players =

This is a list of foreign players in the Ekstraklasa, which commenced play in 1927. Up to now, 116 different federations associated with one of the following: AFC, CAF, CONCACAF, CONMEBOL, OFC or UEFA have been represented in Ekstraklasa.

Players must meet both of the following two criteria:

1. Have played at least one Ekstraklasa game. Players who were signed by Ekstraklasa clubs, but only played in a lower league, cup, and/or European games, or did not play in any competitive games at all, are not included.
2. Are considered foreign, i.e., outside Poland determined by the following:

A player is considered foreign if he is not eligible to play for the national team of Poland.

More specifically,

- If a player has been capped on an international level, the national team is used; if he has been capped by more than one country, the highest level (or the most recent) team is used. These include Polish players with dual citizenship.
- If a player has not been capped on an international level, his country of birth is used, except those who were born abroad from Polish parents or moved to Poland at a young age, and those who clearly indicated to have switched his nationality to another nation.

Clubs listed are those for which the player has played at least one Ekstraklasa game – and seasons are those in which the player has played at least one Ekstraklasa game. Note that seasons, not calendar years, are used. For example, "1992–95" indicates that the player has played in every season from 1992–93 to 1994–95, but not necessarily every calendar year from 1992 to 1995. Therefore, a player should always have a listing under at least two years – for instance, a player making his debut in 2016, during the 2015–16 season, will have '2015–16' after his name. This follows the general practice in expressing sporting seasons.

In bold: players who have played at least one Ekstraklasa game in the current season (2025–26 season), and are still at a club for which they have played. This does not include current players of an Ekstraklasa club who have not played an Ekstraklasa game in the current season.

Details correct as of the end of the 2025–26 season. Please note: This list is currently being reworked, and may still include players who are/were eligible to play for Poland.

== Africa (CAF) ==
=== Algeria ===
- Akim Zedadka – Piast Gliwice – 2024–25
- Mohammed Rahoui – Lechia Gdańsk – 2012–13

=== Angola ===
- Capita – Radomiak Radom – 2024–26
- Alexander Christovão – Zagłębie Sosnowiec – 2018–19
- Depú – Radomiak Radom – 2025–26
- Giovanni – Arka Gdynia – 2010–11

=== Burkina Faso ===
- Préjuce Nakoulma – Widzew Łódź, Górnik Zabrze – 2010–14
- Victor Nikiéma – Piast Gliwice – 2013–14
- Moussa Ouattara – Legia Warsaw – 2005–06
- **Abdoul Tapsoba** – **Radomiak Radom** – 2024–
- Abdou Razack Traoré – Lechia Gdańsk – 2010–13

=== Burundi ===
- Saïdi Ntibazonkiza – Cracovia – 2010–14

=== Cameroon ===
- Emmanuel Agbor – Miedź Legnica – 2022–23
- **Jean Batoum** – **Cracovia** – 2025–
- Clément Beaud – Widzew Łódź – 2001–02
- Alain Bono – Widzew Łódź – 2007–08
- Serge Branco – Wisła Kraków – 2010–11
- Arnaud Djoum – Lech Poznań – 2014–15
- Donald Djoussé – Pogoń Szczecin – 2012–14
- Enzo Ebosse – Jagiellonia Białystok – 2024–25
- Develous Ebot – KSZO Ostrowiec Świętokrzyski – 1997–98
- François Endene – Pogoń Szczecin – 2005–06
- Franck Essomba – Jagiellonia Białystok – 2010–11
- Guy Feutchine – Wisła Kraków – 1996–98
- Ferdinand Chi Fon – Pogoń Szczecin, GKS Katowice, GKS Bełchatów, Górnik Łęczna – 1999–2001, 2002–03, 2005–07 (Note: Acquired Polish citizenship)
- Bleriot Heuyot – Widzew Łódź, Lech Poznań – 1997–99
- Jean Jules – Górnik Zabrze – 2021–23
- **Steve Kingue** – **Radomiak Radom** – 2024–
- Joseph Mawaye – Arka Gdynia – 2009–11
- Ebénézer Mfomou – Stal Mielec – 1994–95
- Moses Molongo – Zagłębie Lubin – 1997–2000
- Frankline Mudoh – Legia Warsaw – 1998–99
- Jean Black Ngody – Górnik Zabrze, Stomil Olsztyn – 2000–01
- **Jean-Pierre Nsame** – **Legia Warsaw** – 2024–
- Arnold Sinju – KSZO Ostrowiec Świętokrzyski – 1997–98
- Hervé Tchami – Pogoń Szczecin – 2013–14

=== Cape Verde ===
- Vagner Dias – Radomiak Radom – 2023–25
- Jorge Kadú – Zawisza Bydgoszcz – 2013–15
- **Vasco Lopes** – **Radomiak Radom** – 2025–
- Hildeberto Pereira – Legia Warsaw – 2017–18
- Lisandro Semedo – Radomiak Radom – 2022–24

=== Congo ===
- **Gabriel Charpentier** – **Cracovia** – 2025–

=== Democratic Republic of the Congo ===
- Mike Cestor – Radomiak Radom – 2022–24
- N'Dayi Kalenga – Pogoń Szczecin – 2001–02
- **Steve Kapuadi** – Wisła Płock, Legia Warsaw, **Widzew Łódź** – 2022–
- **Jason Lokilo** – Górnik Łęczna, **Piast Gliwice** – 2021–22, 2025–
- Christian Maghoma – Arka Gdynia – 2018–20
- Christopher Oualembo – Lechia Gdańsk – 2012–14
- Afimico Pululu – Jagiellonia Białystok – 2023–26
- Joël Tshibamba – Arka Gdynia, Lech Poznań – 2009–11

=== Egypt ===
- Ahmed Ghanem Soltan – Legia Warsaw – 2005–06

=== Equatorial Guinea ===
- Mamadou Baldé – Legia Warsaw – 2006–07
- **Iban Salvador** – **Wisła Płock** – 2025–

=== Gabon ===
- Éric Mouloungui – Śląsk Wrocław – 2012–13

=== Gambia ===
- Joseph Ceesay – Lechia Gdańsk – 2020–22
- Kebba Ceesay – Lech Poznań – 2012–16
- **Musa Juwara** – **Pogoń Szczecin** – 2025–
- Alasana Manneh – Górnik Zabrze – 2019–23
- Ebrahima Sawaneh – Lech Poznań – 2004–06

=== Ghana ===
- Seth Ablade – Polonia Warsaw – 2002–03
- Frank Adu Kwame – Podbeskidzie Bielsko-Biała, Miedź Legnica – 2013–16, 2018–19
- Joseph Aziz – Legia Warsaw, Lechia/Olimpia Gdańsk, Polonia Warsaw – 1995–97
- Ishmael Baidoo – Górnik Zabrze – 2018–20, 2021–22
- Richmond Boakye – Górnik Zabrze – 2020–21
- **Osman Bukari** – **Widzew Łódź** – 2025–
- Emmanuel Kumah – Wisła Kraków – 2018–20
- Odartey Lamptey – Dyskobolia Grodzisk Wielkopolski – 2000–02
- David Mawutor – Wisła Kraków – 2020–21
- Abdul Aziz Tetteh – Lech Poznań – 2015–18
- Emmanuel Tetteh – Lechia/Olimpia Gdańsk, Polonia Warsaw – 1995–97
- **Ema Twumasi** – **Piast Gliwice** – 2025–
- Yaw Yeboah – Wisła Kraków – 2020–22

=== Guinea ===
- Daouda Camara – Amica Wronki, Dyskobolia Grodzisk Wielkopolski – 1996–97, 1999–2003
- **Ibrahima Camará** – **Radomiak Radom** – 2025–
- Momo Cissé – Wisła Kraków – 2021–22
- Sékou Oumar Dramé – Lech Poznań, Dyskobolia Grodzisk Wielkopolski, Petro Płock – 1995–2000
- José Kanté – Górnik Zabrze, Wisła Płock, Legia Warsaw – 2015–21
- Alkhaly Soumah – Stomil Olsztyn – 1995–97
- **Salifou Soumah** – **Radomiak Radom** – 2025–
- Fodé Soumah – Amica Wronki – 1995–96

=== Guinea–Bissau ===
- **Elves Baldé** – **Radomiak Radom** – 2025–
- Romário Baldé – Lechia Gdańsk – 2017–18
- Jardel – Radomiak Radom – 2023–24
- Jorginho – Wisła Płock – 2021–22
- Pedro Justiniano – Radomiak Radom – 2022–23
- Rudinilson Silva – Lechia Gdańsk – 2014–16

=== Ivory Coast ===
- **Yannick Agnero** – **Lech Poznań** – 2025–
- Adriel Ba Loua – Lech Poznań – 2021–25
- Souleymane Koné – Wisła Kraków – 2020–21
- **Alassane Sidibe** – **Arka Gdynia** – 2025–
- Boliguibia Ouattara – Korona Kielce – 2014–15
- **Zié Ouattara** – **Radomiak Radom** – 2024–
- Abdul Moustapha Ouédraogo – Pogoń Szczecin – 2013–14

=== Kenya ===
- **Erick Otieno** – **Raków Częstochowa** – 2023–
- **Timothy Ouma** – **Lech Poznań** – 2025–

=== Liberia ===
- Peter Wilson – Podbeskidzie Bielsko-Biała – 2020–21

=== Madagascar ===
- **Andy Pelmard** – **Jagiellonia Białystok** – 2025–

=== Mali ===
- Bassekou Diabaté – Lechia Gdańsk – 2021–23

=== Mauritius ===
- Lindsay Rose – Legia Warsaw – 2021–24

=== Morocco ===
- Nabil Aankour – Korona Kielce, Arka Gdynia – 2014–20
- Saad Agouzoul – Radomiak Radom – 2024–25
- Nourdin Boukhari – Wisła Kraków – 2010–11
- El Mehdi Sidqy – Jagiellonia Białystok, Piast Gliwice – 2009–13

=== Mozambique ===
- Ricardo Guima – ŁKS Łódź – 2019–20

=== Niger ===
- Abdoulmoumoni Garba – Hutnik Kraków – 1996–97
- Mounkaïla Idé Barkiré – Hutnik Kraków – 1996–97
- Zakari Lambo – Hutnik Kraków – 1994–96
- Amadou Noma – Sokół Tychy – 1996–97
- Moussa Yahaya – Sokół Tychy, Hutnik Kraków, GKS Katowice, Legia Warsaw – 1995–97, 2000–04

=== Nigeria ===
- **Abbati Abdullahi** – **Górnik Zabrze** – 2024–
- David Abwo – Zagłębie Lubin – 2010–14
- **Samuel Akere** – **Widzew Łódź** – 2025–
- Ahmed Aliyu – Petro Płock – 1999–2000
- Napoleon Amaefule – Polonia Warsaw – 2002–03
- Benson Anih – Świt Nowy Dwór Mazowiecki – 2003–04
- Dondu Avaa – Petro Płock – 1999–2001
- Nathaniel Ayanwale – Amica Wronki – 1997–98
- William Bassey – Zagłębie Lubin – 1997–98
- Daniel Chima Chukwu – Legia Warsaw – 2016–18
- Chioma Chimezie – Widzew Łódź – 1998–99, 2000–01
- Eddy Lord Dombraye – ŁKS Łódź, Stomil Olsztyn – 1998–2001
- Emmanuel Ekwueme – Polonia Warsaw, Widzew Łódź, Wisła Płock – 1999–2004
- Martins Ekwueme – Polonia Warsaw, Wisła Kraków, Legia Warsaw, Zagłębie Lubin – 2001–02, 2003–06, 2007–11, 2012–13 (Note: Acquired Polish citizenship on 2 September 2016)
- Hugo Enyinnaya – Górnik Zabrze – 2004–06
- Rowland Eresaba – Legia Warsaw – 2000–01 (Note: Acquired Polish citenship in 2006)
- Hilary Gong – Widzew Łódź – 2024–
- Austin Hamlet – ŁKS Łódź, Stomil Olsztyn – 1997–2001
- Sunday Ibrahim – Wisła Kraków, KSZO Ostrowiec Świętokrzyski, Zagłębie Lubin – 1997–2003, 2005–06
- Kelvyn Igwe – Polonia Warsaw – 2005–06
- Kelechi Iheanacho – Wisła Kraków, Stomil Olsztyn, Widzew Łódź – 1999–2002, 2003–05, 2006–07
- Benjamin Imeh – Polonia Warsaw, Arka Gdynia – 2004–06
- **Taofeek Ismaheel** – Górnik Zabrze, **Lech Poznań** – 2024–
- Maxwell Kalu – Amica Wronki, Widzew Łódź, KSZO Ostrowiec Świętokrzyski, Świt Nowy Dwór Mazowiecki – 1997–2004
- Nuruddeen Lawal – Stomil Olsztyn – 1997–99
- Celestine Lazarus – Podbeskidzie Bielsko-Biała – 2015–16
- Abraham Marcus – Radomiak Radom – 2021–22
- Mike Mozie – Petro Płock – 1999–2001
- **Paul Mukairu** – **Pogoń Szczecin** – 2025–
- Justin Nnorom – Lech Poznań – 1998–2000 (Note: Acquired Polish citizenship in 2011)
- Charles Nwaogu – Podbeskidzie Bielsko-Biała – 2013–14
- Emeka Obidile – Petro Płock – 1999–2001
- Felix Ogbuke – Legia Warsaw – 2010–11
- **Abraham Ojo** – **Raków Częstochowa** – 2025–
- Princewill Okachi – Widzew Łódź – 2011–14
- Mike Okoro – Amica Wronki – 2000–01
- Sylvester Okosun – ŁKS Łódź – 1996–97
- Emmanuel Olisadebe – Polonia Warsaw – 1997–2001 (Note: Since 1st round of 2000–01 season player considered as Polish citizen)
- Dudu Omagbemi – Wisła Kraków – 2007–08
- Temple Omeonu – Wisła Kraków, GKS Bełchatów – 2004–06
- Darlington Omodiagbe – ŁKS Łódź – 1997–2000
- Daniel Onyekachi – GKS Katowice – 2004–05
- Ikemefuna Ozuah – Wisła Płock – 1999–2001, 2002–03
- Abel Salami – Stomil Olsztyn, Szczakowianka Jaworzno – 2000–03
- Jero Shakpoke – Zagłębie Lubin – 1997–98
- Godfrey Stephen – Jagiellonia Białystok – 2020–22
- Junior Torunarigha – Zagłębie Sosnowiec – 2018–19
- Kalu Uche – Wisła Kraków – 2001–06
- Cornelius Udebuluzor – Górnik Zabrze – 1996–97
- Stanley Udenkwor – Polonia Warsaw – 2000–03
- Ugo Ukah – Widzew Łódź, Jagiellonia Białystok – 2007–08, 2010–14
- Philip Umukoro – Dyskobolia Grodzisk Wielkopolski, GKS Katowice – 2000–02
- Kenneth Zeigbo – Legia Warsaw – 1997–98

=== São Tomé and Príncipe ===
- Nuno Malheiro – Zagłębie Sosnowiec – 2018–19

=== Senegal ===
- Issa Ba – Wisła Kraków – 2009–10
- Idrissa Cissé – Podbeskidzie Bielsko-Biała – 2014–15
- Boubacar Dialiba – Cracovia – 2014–16
- Djibril Diaw – Korona Kielce – 2015–19
- Cheikhou Dieng – Zagłębie Lubin – 2021–23
- **Pape Meïssa Ba** – **Widzew Łódź** – 2025–
- **Mbaye Jacques Ndiaye** – **Motor Lublin** – 2024–
- **Mor Ndiaye** – **Pogoń Szczecin** – 2025–
- Pape Samba Ba – Lech Poznań – 2005–06
- **Ibrahima Seck** – **Raków Częstochowa** – 2024–
- **Christopher Simon** – **Motor Lublin** – 2024–
- Ousmane Sow – Górnik Zabrze – 2024–26
- Émile Thiakane – Puszcza Niepołomice – 2023–24
- Mouhamadou Traoré – Zagłębie Lubin, Pogoń Szczecin, GKS Bełchatów – 2009–13
- Diemé Yahiya – Polonia Warsaw – 2012–13

=== South Africa ===
- Thabo Cele – Radomiak Radom – 2021–23
- Daylon Claasen – Lech Poznań – 2013–14
- Ricardo Nunes – Pogoń Szczecin – 2014–20

=== Togo ===
- Austine Igbinosa – Zagłębie Lubin – 1998–99
- Lantame Ouadja – Wisła Kraków – 2003–04

=== Tunisia ===
- Hachem Abbès – Widzew Łódź – 2011–14
- Mehdi Ben Dhifallah – Widzew Łódź – 2011–13
- Souheïl Ben Radhia – Widzew Łódź – 2010–12
- Amine Hadj Saïd – Piast Gliwice – 2014–15

=== Zambia ===
- Derby Makinka – Lech Poznań – 1991–92
- Lubambo Musonda – Śląsk Wrocław – 2018–22
- Noel Sikhosana – Wisła Kraków – 1990–91

=== Zimbabwe ===
- Felix Antonio – Sokół Tychy – 1996–97
- Takesure Chinyama – Dyskobolia Grodzisk Wielkopolski, Legia Warsaw – 2006–11
- Dickson Choto – Górnik Zabrze, Pogoń Szczecin, Legia Warsaw – 2000–13
- Herbert Dick – Legia Warsaw – 2006–07
- Edelbert Dinha – Sokół Pniewy, Sokół Tychy – 1994–96
- Dzikamai Gwaze – Górnik Zabrze – 2013–16
- Elasto Kapowezha – Sokół Tychy, Lech Poznań – 1995–97
- Shingi Kawondera – Górnik Zabrze – 1999–2002
- Leo Kurauzvione – Legia Warsaw – 2004–05
- Norman Mapeza – Sokół Pniewy – 1993–94
- Clement Matawu – Polonia Bytom – 2010–11
- Prince Matore – Sokół Tychy, Raków Częstochowa – 1995–98
- George Mbwando – Lech Poznań – 1996–97
- Usman Misi – Sokół Pniewy – 1994–95
- Gift Muzadzi – Lech Poznań – 1995–96
- Ndabenkulu Ncube – Jagiellonia Białystok – 2010–11
- George Nechironga – Sokół Pniewy – 1994–95
- Costa Nhamoinesu – Zagłębie Lubin – 2009–13
- John Phiri – Sokół Pniewy, Warta Poznań – 1993–95

== Asia (AFC) ==
=== Afghanistan ===
- Omran Haydary – Lechia Gdańsk – 2019–22

=== Australia ===
- Jacob Burns – Wisła Kraków – 2005–07
- Jordan Courtney-Perkins – Raków Częstochowa, Warta Poznań – 2021–22
- Louis D'Arrigo – Lechia Gdańsk – 2024–25
- Labinot Haliti – ŁKS Łódź – 2007–09
- **Deni Jurić** – **Wisła Płock** – 2025–
- Jake McGing – Wisła Płock – 2018–19
- Michael Thwaite – Wisła Kraków – 2006–08

=== China ===
- Dong Fangzhuo – Legia Warsaw – 2009–10

=== Indonesia ===
- Otávio Dutra – Pogoń Szczecin – 2006–07
- Egy Maulana Vikri – Lechia Gdańsk – 2018–21

=== Iran ===
- Farshad Ahmadzadeh – Śląsk Wrocław – 2018–19
- **Ali Gholizadeh** – **Lech Poznań** – 2023–
- Yadegar Rostami – Pogoń Szczecin, ŁKS Łódź – 2022–24

=== Iraq ===
- **Amir Al-Ammari** – **Cracovia** – 2024–
- **Hussein Ali** – **Pogoń Szczecin** – 2025–

=== Japan ===
- Takafumi Akahoshi – Pogoń Szczecin – 2012–17
- Yosuke Furukawa – Górnik Zabrze – 2024–25
- Koki Hinokio – Stal Mielec, Zagłębie Lubin – 2021–25
- Jin Izumisawa – Pogoń Szczecin – 2018–19
- Kohei Kato – Podbeskidzie Bielsko-Biała – 2015–16
- Seiya Kitano – Pogoń Szczecin – 2016–17
- **Yuki Kobayashi** – **Jagiellonia Białystok** – 2025–
- Sōichirō Kōzuki – Górnik Zabrze – 2023–24
- Daisuke Matsui – Lechia Gdańsk – 2013–14
- Ryota Morioka – Śląsk Wrocław – 2015–17
- Ryōya Morishita – Legia Warsaw – 2023–26
- Takuya Murayama – Pogoń Szczecin – 2012–16
- Shuma Nagamatsu – Korona Kielce – 2024–25
- Kimitoshi Nōgawa – Górnik Zabrze – 2003–04
- Shohei Okuno – Pogoń Szczecin – 2014–15
- Kanji Okunuki – Górnik Zabrze – 2022–23
- Takuto Oshima – Cracovia – 2022–24
- **Hide Vitalucci** – **Arka Gdynia** – 2025–
- Daisuke Yokota – Górnik Zabrze – 2023–24

=== Kyrgyzstan ===
- Edgar Bernhardt – Cracovia – 2013–14
- Sergei Nikitin – Pogoń Szczecin – 1992–95

=== Palestine ===
- Assad Al Hamlawi – Śląsk Wrocław – 2024–25
- Alexis Norambuena – Jagiellonia Białystok, GKS Bełchatów – 2007–15

=== South Korea ===
- **Goh Young-jun** – **Górnik Zabrze** – 2025–
- Kim Min-kyun – Jagiellonia Białystok – 2012–13
- Lee Jin-hyun – Puszcza Niepołomice – 2023–25

=== United Arab Emirates ===
- Mohamed Awadalla – Lechia Gdańsk – 2025–26

=== Uzbekistan ===
- Jasurbek Yaxshiboyev – Legia Warsaw – 2020–21

== Europe (UEFA) ==
=== Albania ===
- Bekim Balaj – Jagiellonia Białystok – 2013–14
- Vullnet Basha – Wisła Kraków – 2017–21
- Eneo Bitri – Cracovia – 2023–24
- Edgar Çani – Polonia Warsaw – 2011–13
- Jurgen Çelhaka – Legia Warsaw – 2021–25
- Enkeleid Dobi – Zagłębie Lubin, Górnik Zabrze – 2000–03
- **Elton Fikaj** – **Piast Gliwice** – 2025–
- Afrim Kuci – Siarka Tarnobrzeg – 1993–94
- Ernest Muçi – Legia Warsaw – 2020–24
- Sebino Plaku – Śląsk Wrocław – 2013–15
- Armando Sadiku – Legia Warsaw – 2017–18
- **Lindon Selahi** – **Widzew Łódź** – 2025–
- **Juljan Shehu** – **Widzew Łódź** – 2022–
- Ervin Skela – Arka Gdynia – 2010–11

=== Armenia ===
- Robert Arzumanyan – Jagiellonia Białystok – 2010–12
- **Vahan Bichakhchyan** – Pogoń Szczecin, **Legia Warsaw** – 2021–
- Narek Grigoryan – Jagiellonia Białystok – 2021–22
- Levon Hayrapetyan – Lechia Gdańsk, Widzew Łódź – 2010–14
- Aghvan Papikyan – ŁKS Łódź – 2011–12

=== Austria ===
- Husein Balić – ŁKS Łódź – 2023–24
- Emir Dilaver – Lech Poznań – 2017–18
- Kevin Friesenbichler – Lechia Gdańsk – 2014–15, 2022–23
- Ronald Gërçaliu – ŁKS Łódź – 2011–12
- Alexander Gorgon – Pogoń Szczecin – 2020–25
- Sandro Gotal – Piast Gliwice – 2016–17
- Dominik Hofbauer – Arka Gdynia – 2016–17
- **Dijon Kameri** – **Cracovia** – 2025–
- Martin Kreuzriegler – Widzew Łódź – 2022–23
- Constantin Reiner – Piast Gliwice – 2021–23
- Stefan Savić – Wisła Kraków, Warta Poznań – 2020–24
- Daniel Sikorski – Górnik Zabrze, Polonia Warsaw, Wisła Kraków – 2010–13
- Alex Sobczyk – Górnik Zabrze, Piast Gliwice – 2020–23
- Srđan Spiridonović – Pogoń Szczecin – 2019–20
- David Stec – Pogoń Szczecin, Lechia Gdańsk – 2018–23
- Richard Strebinger – Legia Warsaw – 2021–22
- Dominik Wydra – Raków Częstochowa – 2021–22
- Benedikt Zech – Pogoń Szczecin – 2019–25

=== Azerbaijan ===
- **Renat Dadashov** – Radomiak Radom, **Motor Lublin** – 2024–
- Mahir Emreli – Legia Warsaw – 2021–22
- Anton Kryvotsyuk – Wisła Płock – 2021–23
- Ruslan Məcidov – Widzew Łódź – 2006–07
- Rahil Məmmədov – ŁKS Łódź, Radomiak Radom – 2023–25
- Saşa Yunisoğlu – Dyskobolia Grodzisk Wielkopolski – 2007–08

=== Belarus ===
- Syarhey Amelyanchuk – Legia Warsaw – 2000–03
- Syarhey Amyalyusik – Motor Lublin – 1989–90
- **Herman Barkouski** – Puszcza Niepołomice, **Piast Gliwice** – 2024–
- Eduard Baltrushevich – Petro Płock – 1999–2000
- **Matvey Bokhno** – **Wisła Płock** – 2025–
- Mikalay Branfilaw – Wisła Płock – 2002–05
- Ihar Hurynovich – ŁKS Łódź – 1992–93
- Andrey Khlebasolaw – Wisła Kraków – 1991–93
- Boris Karasev – Górnik Zabrze – 1995–96
- Vladimir Klimovich – Stomil Olsztyn, Petro Płock – 1998–2000
- Dzmitry Klochek – Raków Częstochowa – 1997–98
- Sergey Krivets – Lech Poznań, Wisła Płock, Arka Gdynia – 2009–12, 2016–18
- Alyaksandr Lebedzew – Widzew Łódź – 2012–13
- Vladimir Lomako – Górnik Zabrze – 1995–96
- Yury Maleyew – Zawisza Bydgoszcz – 1991–94
- Ivan Mayewski – Zawisza Bydgoszcz – 2014–15
- Dmitri Nazarov – Zagłębie Lubin – 1996–98
- Aleksandr Osipovich – Zagłębie Lubin, Polonia Warsaw – 2000–02, 2003–04
- Aleksandr Pavlovets – Warta Poznań – 2021–22
- Pavel Pavlyuchenko – Bruk-Bet Termalica Nieciecza – 2021–22
- Filipp Rudik – Górnik Łęczna – 2014–15
- Pavel Savitsky – Jagiellonia Białystok – 2014–15
- Alyaksandr Sazankow – Lechia Gdańsk – 2010–12
- Yevgeny Shikavka – Korona Kielce – 2022–25
- **Ilya Shkurin** – Raków Częstochowa, Stal Mielec, Legia Warsaw, **GKS Katowice** – 2021–22, 2023–
- Andrey Sinichin – Stomil Olsztyn, Amica Wronki, Polonia Warsaw – 1995–97, 1998–99, 2000–01, 2002–03
- Mikhail Sivakow – Wisła Kraków – 2010–11
- Mikhail Smirnov – Zawisza Bydgoszcz – 1992
- Sergey Solodovnikov – Jagiellonia Białystok – 1992–93
- Aleh Veratsila – Podbeskidzie Bielsko-Biała – 2015–16
- Dzmitry Verkhawtsow – Korona Kielce – 2015–17
- Sergey Yasinsky – Jagiellonia Białystok – 1992–93
- Yawhen Zhuk – Orlen Płock – 2000–01

=== Belgium ===
- Milan Corryn – Warta Poznań – 2021–23
- Mehdi Lehaire – Miedź Legnica – 2022–23
- **Hervé Matthys** – **Motor Lublin** – 2024–
- Mohamed Mezghrani – Warta Poznań – 2023–24
- Vadis Odjidja-Ofoe – Legia Warsaw – 2016–17
- **Martin Remacle** – **Korona Kielce** – 2023–
- **Youssuf Sylla** – **Jagiellonia Białystok** – 2025–

=== Bosnia and Herzegovina ===
- Admir Adžem – Pogoń Szczecin, GKS Katowice, Zagłębie Sosnowiec – 2002–04, 2007–08
- Ensar Arifović – Polonia Warsaw, ŁKS Łódź, Jagiellonia Białystok – 2005–09
- Tomislav Bašić – Arka Gdynia – 2008–09
- **Samed Baždar** – **Jagiellonia Białystok** – 2025–
- Gordan Bunoza – Wisła Kraków – 2010–14
- **Jasmin Burić** – Lech Poznań, **Zagłębie Lubin** – 2009–19, 2021– (Note: Acquired Polish citizenship on 6 March 2017)
- Azer Bušuladžić – Arka Gdynia – 2019–20
- Tarik Cerić – ŁKS Łódź – 2006–08
- Miroslav Čovilo – Cracovia – 2014–19
- **Filip Čuić** – **Pogoń Szczecin** – 2025–
- Armin Ćerimagić – Górnik Zabrze – 2014–16
- **Josip Ćorluka** – **Zagłębie Lubin** – 2024–
- Željko Đokić – Ruch Chorzów – 2010–13
- Velibor Đurić – Widzew Łódź – 2010–11
- Amar Ferhatović – GKS Bełchatów – 2005–06
- Ognjen Gnjatić – Korona Kielce – 2018–20
- **Said Hamulić** – Stal Mielec, Widzew Łódź, **Wisła Płock** – 2022–23, 2024–25
- Haris Handžić – Lech Poznań – 2009–10
- **Ajdin Hasić** – **Cracovia** – 2024–
- Dženan Hošić – Szczakowianka Jaworzno, Zagłębie Sosnowiec – 2002–03, 2007–08
- Dino Hotić – Lech Poznań – 2023–25
- Zlatko Janjić – Korona Kielce – 2017–19
- Omer Joldić – GKS Bełchatów – 2005–06
- Vlastimir Jovanović – Korona Kielce, Bruk-Bet Termalica Nieciecza – 2010–18, 2021–22 (Note: Acquired Polish citizenship in August 2017)
- Ivan Jukić – Korona Kielce – 2017–20
- Stipe Jurić – ŁKS Łódź – 2023–24
- **Rifet Kapić** – **Lechia Gdańsk** – 2024–
- Sanel Kapidžić – Korona Kielce – 2017–18
- Elvir Koljić – Lech Poznań – 2017–18
- Adnan Kovačević – Korona Kielce, Raków Częstochowa – 2017–20, 2023–24
- Vladan Kovačević – Raków Częstochowa, Legia Warsaw – 2021–25
- Zvonimir Kožulj – Pogoń Szczecin – 2018–20
- Stjepan Lončar – Lech Poznań – 2024–25
- Adi Mehremić – Wisła Kraków – 2020–21
- Muris Mešanović – Bruk-Bet Termalica Nieciecza, Puszcza Niepołomice – 2021–22, 2023–24
- Semjon Milošević – Cracovia – 2008–09
- Božo Musa – Miedź Legnica – 2018–19
- Alen Mustafić – Śląsk Wrocław – 2023–24
- Bojan Nastić – Jagiellonia Białystok, Wisła Płock – 2020–24, 2025–26
- Amer Osmanagić – Zagłębie Lubin – 2010–11
- Boris Pandža – Górnik Zabrze – 2013–14
- Bojan Puzigaća – Cracovia – 2010–12
- Imad Rondić – Widzew Łódź, Raków Częstochowa – 2023–26
- Damir Sadiković – Cracovia – 2020–22
- Vladimir Sladojević – Górnik Zabrze – 2003–04
- Amir Spahić – Śląsk Wrocław – 2009–14
- Nenad Studen – Wisła Płock – 2004–05
- Asmir Suljić – Zagłębie Lubin – 2019–20
- Muhamed Šahinović – Raków Częstochowa – 2023–24
- Edin Šaranović – Pogoń Szczecin – 2002–03
- Semir Štilić – Lech Poznań, Wisła Kraków, Wisła Płock – 2008–12, 2013–15, 2016–19
- Vule Trivunović – Cracovia – 2010–11
- Stojan Vranješ – Lechia Gdańsk, Legia Warsaw, Piast Gliwice – 2013–18
- Sead Zilić – Wisła Płock – 2005–06

=== Bulgaria ===
- Mihail Aleksandrov – Legia Warsaw – 2015–17
- **Plamen Andreev** – **Lech Poznań** – 2025–
- Bozhidar Chorbadzhiyski – Stal Mielec, Widzew Łódź – 2020–23
- Spas Delev – Pogoń Szczecin – 2016–19
- Kristiyan Dobrev – Lech Poznań – 2006–07
- Diego Ferraresso – Cracovia – 2016–21
- Milen Gamakov – Lechia Gdańsk, Ruch Chorzów – 2016–17
- Tsvetan Genkov – Wisła Kraków – 2010–13
- Georgi Hristov – Wisła Kraków – 2009–10
- Dimitar Iliev – Wisła Płock – 2016–17
- Sylvester Jasper – Śląsk Wrocław – 2024–25
- Anton Karachanakov – Cracovia – 2015–16
- Aleksandar Kolev – Sandecja Nowy Sącz, Arka Gdynia, Raków Częstochowa, Stal Mielec – 2017–22
- Boris Kondev – Wisła Płock – 2003–04
- Plamen Krachunov – Sandecja Nowy Sącz – 2017–18
- Lyubomir Lubenov – Arka Gdynia – 2008–10
- Dimitar Makriev – Górnik Zabrze – 2003–04
- **Martin Minchev** – **Cracovia** – 2024–
- Iliyan Mitsanski – Amica Wronki, Lech Poznań, Korona Kielce, Odra Wodzisław Śląski, Zagłębie Lubin – 2005–08, 2009–10, 2016–17
- **Vladimir Nikolov** – **Korona Kielce** – 2025–
- Aleks Petkov – Śląsk Wrocław – 2023–25
- Simeon Petrov – Śląsk Wrocław – 2023–25
- **Viktor Popov** – **Korona Kielce** – 2025–
- **Borislav Rupanov** – **Górnik Zabrze** – 2025–
- Stoyko Sakaliev – Arka Gdynia – 2009–10
- Simeon Slavchev – Lechia Gdańsk – 2016–18
- Radostin Stanev – Legia Warsaw – 2001–03
- Ivaylo Stoimenov – Górnik Zabrze – 2005–06
- Aleksandar Tonev – Lech Poznań – 2011–13
- Aleksandar Tunchev – Zagłębie Lubin – 2012–13
- Dimitar Velkovski – Miedź Legnica – 2022–23
- Pavel Vidanov – Zagłębie Lubin, Górnik Zabrze – 2011–14, 2015–16

=== Croatia ===
- Mladen Alajbeg – Polonia Warsaw – 1999–2000
- Mario Andračić – Górnik Zabrze – 2002–03
- Domagoj Antolić – Legia Warsaw – 2017–21
- Marijan Antolović – Legia Warsaw – 2010–11
- **Zoran Arsenić** – Wisła Kraków, Jagiellonia Białystok, **Raków Częstochowa** – 2017–
- Andy Bara – Świt Nowy Dwór Mazowiecki – 2003–04
- Josip Barišić – Zawisza Bydgoszcz, Piast Gliwice, Arka Gdynia – 2014–18
- Jakov Blagaić – Puszcza Niepołomice – 2024–25
- Tomislav Božić – Górnik Łęczna, Wisła Płock, Miedź Legnica – 2014–17, 2018–19
- **Ivan Brkić** – **Motor Lublin** – 2024–
- Petar Brlek – Wisła Kraków – 2015–18
- **Marko Bulat** – **Raków Częstochowa** – 2025–
- Ante Crnac – Raków Częstochowa – 2023–25
- Frane Čačić – Lechia Gdańsk – 2008–09
- **Antonio Čolak** – Lechia Gdańsk, **Legia Warsaw** – 2014–15, 2025–
- Antonini Čulina – Cracovia – 2017–19
- Ivan Ćurić – Podbeskidzie Bielsko-Biała – 2011–12
- Niko Datković – Cracovia – 2017–20
- **Stjepan Davidović** – **Korona Kielce** – 2025–
- **Ivan Durdov** – **Bruk-Bet Termalica Nieciecza** – 2025–
- Ivan Fiolić – Cracovia – 2019–21
- Dino Gavrić – Widzew Łódź – 2012–13
- Denis Glavina – Arka Gdynia – 2010–11
- Toni Golem – Górnik Łęczna, Ruch Chorzów – 2005–08
- Gordan Golik – Lech Poznań – 2009–10
- Luka Gusić – Jagiellonia Białystok – 2011–13
- Tibor Halilović – Wisła Kraków – 2017–19
- Branko Hucika – Polonia Warsaw – 2005–06
- Kristijan Ipša – Piast Gliwice – 2015–16
- Filip Jazvić – Arka Gdynia – 2017–18
- Josip Juranović – Legia Warsaw – 2020–22
- Slaven Juriša – Górnik Łęczna – 2016–17
- Toni Jurjev – Ruch Chorzów – 2002–03
- **Marin Karamarko** – **Wisła Płock** – 2025–
- Lek Kćira – Górnik Łęczna – 2005–07
- Danijel Klarić – Wisła Kraków – 2013–14
- Marko Kolar – Wisła Kraków, Wisła Płock – 2017–19, 2021–23
- Grgica Kovač – Orlen Płock – 2000–01
- Matija Kristić – Zagłębie Lubin – 2005–06
- Ivica Križanac – Górnik Zabrze, Dyskobolia Grodzisk Wielkopolski – 2002–05
- Sandro Kulenović – Legia Warsaw – 2018–20
- Damir Kurtović – GKS Katowice – 2003–04
- Mate Lacić – Dyskobolia Grodzisk Wielkopolski, Zagłębie Lubin, GKS Bełchatów – 2005–13
- **Danijel Lončar** – **Pogoń Szczecin** – 2022–
- **Luka Lučić** – **Zagłębie Lubin** – 2025–
- Danijel Mađarić – Zagłębie Lubin – 2004–06
- Mario Maloča – Lechia Gdańsk – 2015–18, 2019–23
- Damir Maretić – Pogoń Szczecin – 1998–99
- Petar Mamić – Podbeskidzie Bielsko-Biała – 2020–21
- Luka Marić – Zawisza Bydgoszcz, Arka Gdynia – 2014–15, 2018–20
- Marko Marić – Lechia Gdańsk – 2015–16
- Stipe Matić – Górnik Zabrze – 2005–06
- Tomislav Mikulić – Cracovia – 2013–15
- **Antonio Milić** – **Lech Poznań** – 2020–
- Mato Miloš – Lechia Gdańsk, Widzew Łódź – 2017–18, 2022–24
- **Mihael Mlinarić** – **Zagłębie Lubin** – 2025–
- Dalibor Možanić – Górnik Zabrze – 2000–01
- Karlo Muhar – Lech Poznań – 2019–21
- Matko Perdijić – Ruch Chorzów, Cracovia, Zagłębie Sosnowiec – 2007–09, 2010–14, 2018–19
- **Mauro Perković** – **Cracovia** – 2024–
- Oliver Petrak – Korona Kielce – 2017–19
- Anto Petrović – Górnik Łęczna – 2004–05
- Jakov Puljić – Jagiellonia Białystok – 2019–21
- Boris Radovanović – Lechia Gdańsk – 2008–09
- Silvio Rodić – Zagłębie Lubin, Górnik Łęczna – 2013–16
- **Matej Rodin** – Cracovia, Raków Częstochowa, **Lechia Gdańsk** – 2020–
- Marko Roginić – Podbeskidzie Bielsko-Biała – 2020–21
- Ante Rožić – Arka Gdynia – 2010–11
- Dario Rugašević – Piast Gliwice – 2017–18
- Ivan Runje – Jagiellonia Białystok – 2016–21
- Joško Samardžić – KSZO Ostrowiec Świętokrzyski – 2002–03
- Eduardo da Silva – Legia Warsaw – 2017–19
- Dante Stipica – Pogoń Szczecin, Ruch Chorzów – 2019–24
- Ronald Šiklić – Dyskobolia Grodzisk Wielkopolski, Odra Wodzisław Śląski, Górnik Łęczna – 2003–06
- Lorenco Šimić – Zagłębie Lubin – 2020–22
- Marko Šimić – GKS Bełchatów – 2012–13
- Nikola Šimić – Pogoń Szczecin – 1998–99
- Žankarlo Šimunić – Polonia Warsaw – 2005–06
- Mario Šitum – Lech Poznań – 2017–18
- Damir Šovšić – Sandecja Nowy Sącz – 2017–18
- Matija Špičić – Wisła Kraków – 2016–17
- Dino Štiglec – Śląsk Wrocław – 2019–22
- **Boško Šutalo** – **Cracovia** – 2025–
- Josip Tadić – Lechia Gdańsk – 2011–12
- **Tonio Teklić** – **Widzew Łódź** – 2025–
- **Fran Tudor** – **Raków Częstochowa** – 2019–
- Ivan Turina – Lech Poznań – 2008–09
- Ivan Udarević – Polonia Warsaw, ŁKS Łódź – 2004–05, 2007–08
- Tomislav Višević – Zagłębie Lubin – 2006–07
- Dario Vizinger – Warta Poznań – 2023–24
- Ivica Vrdoljak – Legia Warsaw – 2010–15
- Luka Vučko – Lechia Gdańsk – 2010–12
- Luka Vušković – Radomiak Radom – 2023–24
- Mario Zebić – Korona Kielce – 2022–23
- Oliver Zelenika – Lechia Gdańsk – 2017–18
- Grga Zlatoper – Legia Warsaw – 1935–36
- Diego Živulić – Śląsk Wrocław – 2019–20

=== Cyprus ===
- **Stelios Andreou** – **Widzew Łódź** – 2025–
- Dossa Júnior – Legia Warsaw – 2013–15
- **Andreas Katsantonis** – **Piast Gliwice** – 2024–
- **Constantinos Soteriou** – **Korona Kielce** – 2024–

=== Czech Republic ===
- Luboš Adamec – Śląsk Wrocław – 2013–14
- **Lukáš Ambros** – **Górnik Zabrze** – 2024–
- Karsten Ayong – Piast Gliwice – 2018–19
- Daniel Bartl – Raków Częstochowa – 2019–21
- Michal Bezpalec – Bruk-Bet Termalica Nieciecza – 2021–22
- Jiří Bílek – Zagłębie Lubin – 2011–14
- Jan Blažek – Podbeskidzie Bielsko-Biała – 2013–14
- Jan Buryán – Piast Gliwice – 2012–13
- Martin Bystroň – Świt Nowy Dwór Mazowiecki – 2003–04
- Vladimír Čáp – Zagłębie Lubin, Śląsk Wrocław – 2005–06, 2008–09
- Erik Daniel – Zagłębie Lubin – 2021–22
- Radek Dejmek – Korona Kielce – 2013–18
- Radek Divecký – Pogoń Szczecin – 2004–06
- Tomáš Dočekal – Piast Gliwice – 2012–15
- Martin Doležal – Zagłębie Lubin – 2021–23
- Tomáš Došek – Wisła Płock – 2006–07
- Lukáš Droppa – Śląsk Wrocław – 2013–15
- Michal Frydrych – Wisła Kraków – 2020–22
- Marcel Gecov – Śląsk Wrocław – 2015–16
- Patrik Gedeon – Wisła Płock – 2006–07
- Jan Gruber – Odra Wodzisław Śląski – 2008–09
- Marek Hanousek – Widzew Łódź – 2022–26
- Matěj Hanousek – Wisła Kraków – 2021–22
- Martin Hašek – Wisła Płock – 2022–23
- **Patrik Hellebrand** – **Górnik Zabrze** – 2024–
- Adam Hloušek – Legia Warsaw, Bruk-Bet Termalica Nieciecza – 2015–19, 2021–22
- Jakub Hora – Podbeskidzie Bielsko-Biała – 2020–21
- Jan Hošek – Cracovia – 2011–12
- Michal Hubínek – Bruk-Bet Termalica Nieciecza – 2021–22
- Michal Hubník – Legia Warsaw – 2010–12
- Matěj Hybš – Bruk-Bet Termalica Nieciecza – 2021–22
- David Jablonský – Cracovia – 2019–23
- Petr Janečko – Odra Wodzisław Śląski – 2001–02
- Tomáš Jirsák – Wisła Kraków – 2007–12
- Jakub Jugas – Cracovia – 2021–25
- David Kalousek – Zagłębie Lubin, Arka Gdynia – 2004–07
- Petr Kaspřák – Pogoń Szczecin – 2004–05
- Lukáš Killar – Polonia Bytom – 2008–11
- Jan Kliment – Wisła Kraków – 2021–22
- Lubor Knapp – Odra Wodzisław Śląski – 2006–07
- David Kobylík – Polonia Bytom – 2010–11
- David Kotrys – Polonia Bytom – 2009–10
- Lukáš Kubáň – Sandecja Nowy Sącz – 2017–18
- Tomáš Kuchař – Pogoń Szczecin – 2004–05
- David Ledecký – Górnik Zabrze – 2017–18
- Marcel Lička – Górnik Zabrze, Dyskobolia Grodzisk Wielkopolski – 2004–06
- Mario Lička – Bruk-Bet Termalica Nieciecza – 2015–16
- Jakub Mareš – Zagłębie Lubin – 2017–19
- Tomáš Michálek – Wisła Płock – 2006–07
- František Metelka – Podbeskidzie Bielsko-Biała – 2011–12
- Radek Mynář – Dyskobolia Grodzisk Wielkopolski, Polonia Warsaw – 2003–12
- Tomáš Necid – Legia Warsaw – 2016–17
- Martin Nešpor – Piast Gliwice, Zagłębie Lubin – 2015–18
- Josef Obajdin – Wisła Płock – 2005–07
- Zdeněk Ondrášek – Wisła Kraków – 2015–19, 2021–22
- Radek Opršal – Zagłębie Lubin – 2004–05
- Michal Papadopulos – Zagłębie Lubin, Piast Gliwice, Korona Kielce – 2012–14, 2015–20
- Tomáš Pekhart – Legia Warsaw – 2019–25
- Tomáš Pešír – Jagiellonia Białystok – 2008–09
- Tomáš Petrášek – Raków Częstochowa – 2019–23
- Petr Pokorný – Zagłębie Lubin, Śląsk Wrocław – 2004–07, 2008–09
- Jan Polák – Piast Gliwice – 2012–15
- Martin Pospíšil – Jagiellonia Białystok – 2017–23
- Tomáš Poznar – Bruk-Bet Termalica Nieciecza – 2021–22
- Filip Prebsl – Górnik Zabrze – 2024–25
- Tomáš Přikryl – Jagiellonia Białystok, Warta Poznań – 2019–24
- Daniel Rygel – Odra Wodzisław Śląski – 2006–10
- **Lukáš Sadílek** – **Górnik Zabrze** – 2025–
- Radim Sáblík – Odra Wodzisław Śląski, Dyskobolia Grodzisk Wielkopolski – 2001–06
- **Michal Sáček** – Jagiellonia Białystok, **Górnik Zabrze** – 2022–
- Ivo Schmucker – Szczakowianka Jaworzno – 2002–03
- Petr Schwarz – Raków Częstochowa, Śląsk Wrocław – 2019–25
- Lumír Sedláček – Dyskobolia Grodzisk Wielkopolski, Wisła Płock, Piast Gliwice – 2003–04, 2005–07, 2008–10
- Jan Sedlák – Ruch Chorzów – 2023–24
- Václav Sejk – Zagłębie Lubin – 2024–25
- Martin Sus – Stal Mielec – 2020–21
- Jan Sýkora – Lech Poznań – 2020–22
- Jaromír Šimr – Amica Wronki – 2004–06
- Ondřej Šourek – Podbeskidzie Bielsko-Biała – 2011–12
- Pavel Šultes – Polonia Warsaw, Ruch Chorzów – 2011–14
- Kamil Vacek – Piast Gliwice, Śląsk Wrocław – 2015–16, 2017–18
- Michal Václavík – Zagłębie Lubin, Górnik Zabrze – 2006–09
- Vlastimil Vidlička – Wisła Kraków – 2004–05
- Adam Vlkanova – Ruch Chorzów – 2023–24
- Tomáš Zajíc – Zagłębie Lubin – 2021–22
- Martin Zeman – Bruk-Bet Termalica Nieciecza – 2021–22
- **Ondřej Zmrzlý** – **Górnik Zabrze** – 2025–

=== Denmark ===
- **Mads Agger** – **Pogoń Szczecin** – 2025–
- Nicolai Brock-Madsen – Cracovia – 2017–18
- **Isak Brusberg** – **Raków Częstochowa** – 2025–
- Rasmus Carstensen – Lech Poznań – 2024–25
- Riza Durmisi – ŁKS Łódź – 2023–24
- Jan Frederiksen – Wisła Kraków – 2012–13
- Jens Martin Gammelby – Miedź Legnica – 2022–23
- Christian Gytkjær – Lech Poznań – 2017–20
- Mathias Hebo Rasmussen – Cracovia – 2021–23
- Frederik Helstrup – Arka Gdynia – 2017–20
- Mikkel Kirkeskov – Piast Gliwice, Zagłębie Lubin – 2017–21, 2023–24
- **Emil Kornvig** – **Widzew Łódź** – 2025–
- **Lukas Lerager** – **Widzew Łódź** – 2025–
- Mikkel Maigaard – Cracovia – 2023–26
- Lasse Nielsen – Lech Poznań – 2016–18
- Nicki Bille Nielsen – Lech Poznań – 2015–18
- Patrick Olsen – Śląsk Wrocław – 2021–24
- Louka Prip – Jagiellonia Białystok – 2025–26
- **Mileta Rajović** – **Legia Warsaw** – 2025–
- Morten Rasmussen – Pogoń Szczecin – 2017–18
- **Thomas Santos** – **Motor Lublin** – 2025–
- **Mathias Sauer** – **Górnik Zabrze** – 2025–
- Andreas Skovgaard – Cracovia – 2023–25
- Peter Therkildsen – Widzew Łódź – 2024–26
- Kenneth Zohore – Śląsk Wrocław – 2023–24

=== England ===
- Cameron Borthwick-Jackson – Śląsk Wrocław – 2023–24
- **Sam Greenwood** – **Pogoń Szczecin** – 2025–
- Tom Hateley – Śląsk Wrocław, Piast Gliwice – 2013–16, 2017–20, 2021–24
- Eddie Stanford – Legia Warsaw – 2004–05
- D'sean Theobalds – Korona Kielce – 2019–20
- **Josh Wilson-Esbrand** – **Radomiak Radom** – 2025–
- Rashid Yussuff – Arka Gdynia – 2016–17

=== Estonia ===
- Ken Kallaste – Górnik Zabrze, Korona Kielce – 2015–19
- **Märten Kuusk** – **GKS Katowice** – 2024–
- Igor Morozov – Polonia Warsaw – 2012–13
- Sergei Mošnikov – Pogoń Szczecin, Górnik Zabrze – 2012–14
- Henrik Ojamaa – Legia Warsaw, Miedź Legnica – 2013–15, 2018–19
- Sergei Pareiko – Wisła Kraków – 2010–13
- Artur Pikk – Miedź Legnica – 2018–19
- Sander Puri – Korona Kielce – 2010–11
- Rauno Sappinen – Piast Gliwice, Stal Mielec – 2021–23
- Joonas Tamm – Korona Kielce – 2018–19
- Konstantin Vassiljev – Piast Gliwice, Jagiellonia Białystok – 2014–18
- Bogdan Vaštšuk – Stal Mielec – 2022–23
- Sergei Zenjov – Cracovia – 2017–19

=== Faroe Islands ===
- Andrias Edmundsson – Wisła Płock – 2025–26

=== Finland ===
- Paulus Arajuuri – Lech Poznań – 2013–17
- Petteri Forsell – Miedź Legnica, Korona Kielce, Stal Mielec – 2018–21, 2023–24
- Albin Granlund – Stal Mielec – 2020–22
- Pyry Hannola – Stal Mielec – 2024–25
- Arttu Hoskonen – Cracovia – 2022–25
- Santeri Hostikka – Pogoń Szczecin – 2018–21
- **Daniel Håkans** – **Lech Poznań** – 2024–
- Kasper Hämäläinen – Lech Poznań, Legia Warsaw– 2012–19
- Robert Ivanov – Warta Poznań – 2020–23
- Richard Jensen – Górnik Zabrze – 2022–24
- Benjamin Källman – Cracovia – 2022–25
- Niilo Mäenpää – Warta Poznań – 2021–24
- Kai Meriluoto – Stal Mielec – 2023–24
- Joel Perovuo – Jagiellonia Białystok – 2013–14
- Riku Riski – Widzew Łódź – 2010–12
- Joona Toivio – Bruk-Bet Termalica Nieciecza – 2017–18

=== France ===
- Migouel Alfarela – Legia Warsaw – 2024–26
- Jean-Kévin Augustin – Motor Lublin – 2024–25
- Jean-David Beauguel – Stal Mielec – 2024–25
- **Jérémy Blasco** – **Radomiak Radom** – 2025–
- **Quentin Boisgard** – **Piast Gliwice** – 2025–
- Julien Célestine – Arka Gdynia – 2025–26
- **Lamine Diaby-Fadiga** – Jagiellonia Białystok, **Raków Częstochowa** – 2024–
- Noah Diliberto – Widzew Łódź – 2023–25
- **Brandon Domingues** – **Górnik Zabrze** – 2025–
- **Bastien Donio** – **Górnik Zabrze** – 2025–
- Hérold Goulon – Zawisza Bydgoszcz – 2013–15
- Loup-Diwan Gueho – Lechia Gdańsk – 2024–25
- Angelo Hugues – Wisła Kraków – 2002–03
- **Yvan Ikia Dimi** – **Górnik Zabrze** – 2025–
- Olivier Kapo – Korona Kielce – 2014–15
- **Quentin Lecoeuche** – **Wisła Płock** – 2025–
- Adrien Louveau – ŁKS Łódź – 2023–24
- **Benjamin Mendy** – **Pogoń Szczecin** – 2025–
- Thibault Moulin – Legia Warsaw – 2016–18
- **Aurélien Nguiamba** – Jagiellonia Białystok, **Arka Gdynia** – 2022–
- Bryan Nouvier – Raków Częstochowa – 2019–20
- Jayson Papeau – Warta Poznań – 2021–23
- William Rémy – Legia Warsaw – 2017–21
- Vamara Sanogo – Zagłębie Sosnowiec, Legia Warsaw, Górnik Zabrze – 2018–20, 2021–22
- **Brahim Traoré** – **Cracovia** – 2025–
- Hugo Vidémont – Wisła Kraków – 2016–17

=== Georgia ===
- Giorgi Alaverdashvili – Zawisza Bydgoszcz – 2014–15
- Vato Arveladze – Korona Kielce – 2018–20
- Soso Chedia – Dyskobolia Grodzisk Wielkopolski – 1997–98
- Diego Deisadze – Bruk-Bet Termalica Nieciecza – 2025–26 (Note: Acquired Polish citizenship on 15 September 2025)
- Lasha Dvali – Śląsk Wrocław, Pogoń Szczecin – 2015–19
- Vladimer Dvalishvili – Polonia Warsaw, Legia Warsaw, Pogoń Szczecin – 2011–16
- Nika Dzalamidze – Widzew Łódź, Jagiellonia Białystok, Górnik Łęczna – 2010–17
- Giorgi Gabedava – Zagłębie Sosnowiec – 2018–19
- Vladimer Gabedava – Dyskobolia Grodzisk Wielkopolski – 1997–98
- Luka Gagnidze – Raków Częstochowa – 2021–22
- **Tornike Gaprindashvili** – Zagłębie Lubin, **Arka Gdynia** – 2022–24, 2025–
- Merab Gigauri – Jagiellonia Białystok – 2011–12
- Guram Giorbelidze – Zagłębie Lubin – 2022–23
- Gocha Gujabidze – KSZO Ostrowiec Świętokrzyski – 1997–98
- Gia Guruli – GKS Katowice – 1990–92
- Valerian Gvilia – Górnik Zabrze, Legia Warsaw, Raków Częstochowa, Piast Gliwice – 2018–24
- Giorgi Ivanishvili – Zagłębie Sosnowiec – 2018–19
- Mamia Jikia – Ruch Chorzów, Amica Wronki, Wisła Płock, ŁKS Łódź – 1996–2007 (Note: Acquired Polish citizenship in 2018)
- Gia Jishkariani – GKS Katowice – 1991–92
- Nika Kacharava – Korona Kielce, Lech Poznań – 2017–18, 2020–21
- **Otar Kakabadze** – **Cracovia** – 2021–
- Aleksandre Kalandadze – Wisła Płock – 2025–26
- Nika Kvantaliani – Bruk-Bet Termalica Nieciecza – 2017–18
- Nika Kvekveskiri – Lech Poznań – 2020–24
- Giorgi Merebashvili – Wisła Płock – 2016–21
- Levan Mikadze – Pogoń Szczecin – 1997–98
- Giorgi Popkhadze – Jagiellonia Białystok – 2013–15
- Valeri Qazaishvili – Legia Warsaw – 2016–17
- Lasha Rekhviashvili – Ruch Chorzów – 2002–03
- Zaza Revishvili – GKS Katowice – 1992–93
- Koba Shalamberidze – Odra Wodzisław Śląski – 2009–10
- Davit Skhirtladze – Arka Gdynia – 2019–20
- Mate Tsintsadze – Pogoń Szczecin – 2016–18
- Giorgi Tsitaishvili – Wisła Kraków, Lech Poznań – 2021–23
- Luka Zarandia – Arka Gdynia, Korona Kielce – 2016–19, 2022–23

=== Germany ===
- Marcos Álvarez – Cracovia – 2020–22
- Makana Baku – Warta Poznań, Legia Warsaw – 2020–21, 2022–24
- Soufian Benyamina – Pogoń Szczecin – 2018–20
- Kevin Broll – Górnik Zabrze – 2022–23
- Fabian Burdenski – Wisła Kraków, Korona Kielce – 2013–14, 2017–18
- Uli Borowka – Widzew Łódź – 1996–97
- Kaan Caliskaner – Jagiellonia Białystok, Motor Lublin – 2023–25
- Adam Cichon – Widzew Łódź, Polonia Warsaw – 2002–06
- Christian Clemens – Lechia Gdańsk – 2021–23
- Thomas Dähne – Wisła Płock – 2017–20
- Mario Engels – Śląsk Wrocław – 2016–17
- Lawrence Ennali – Górnik Zabrze – 2023–24
- **Morgan Faßbender** – **Bruk-Bet Termalica Nieciecza** – 2025–
- Michael Gardawski – Korona Kielce, Cracovia – 2017–21
- Michael Heinloth – Zagłębie Sosnowiec – 2018–19
- **Gabriel Isik** – **Bruk-Bet Termalica Nieciecza** – 2025–
- Dejan Janjatović – Bruk-Bet Termalica Nieciecza – 2017–18
- Yannick Kakoko – Arka Gdynia – 2016–18
- Meik Karwot – Górnik Zabrze, Radomiak Radom – 2017–18, 2021–22
- **Sebastian Kerk** – Widzew Łódź, **Arka Gdynia** – 2023–
- Sonny Kittel – Raków Częstochowa – 2023–24
- Jonatan Kotzke – Górnik Zabrze – 2022–23
- **Roberto Massimo** – **Górnik Zabrze** – 2025–
- Emil Noll – Arka Gdynia, Pogoń Szczecin – 2010–11, 2012–13
- Carsten Nulle – Górnik Zabrze – 2005–06
- Dragan Paljić – Wisła Kraków – 2010–12
- **Lukas Podolski** – **Górnik Zabrze** – 2021–
- Marco Reich – Jagiellonia Białystok – 2009–10
- Tim Rieder – Śląsk Wrocław – 2017–18
- Simon Schierack – Śląsk Wrocław – 2024–25
- Marvin Senger – Stal Mielec – 2024–25
- Elia Soriano – Korona Kielce – 2017–19
- Lennard Sowah – Cracovia – 2017–18
- Marco Terrazzino – Lechia Gdańsk – 2021–23
- Denis Thomalla – Lech Poznań – 2015–16
- Paul Thomik – Górnik Zabrze – 2011–12
- Noah Weißhaupt – Legia Warsaw – 2025–26

=== Greece ===
- Anestis Argyriou – Zawisza Bydgoszcz – 2014–15
- Petros Bagalianis – Stal Mielec – 2024–25
- Mavroudis Bougaidis – Lechia Gdańsk – 2014–15
- Sokratis Dioudis – Zagłębie Lubin – 2022–24
- **Christos Donis** – **Radomiak Radom** – 2022–
- Stefanos Evangelou – Górnik Zabrze – 2020–21
- Giorgos Giakoumakis – Górnik Zabrze – 2019–20
- Dimitrios Goutas – Lech Poznań – 2018–19
- Stefanos Kapino – Miedź Legnica – 2022–23
- Alexandros Katranis – Piast Gliwice – 2021–24
- **Dimitrios Keramitsis** – **Pogoń Szczecin** – 2024–
- **Apostolos Konstantopoulos** – Raków Częstochowa, **Jagiellonia Białystok** – 2025–
- **Michalis Kosidis** – Puszcza Niepołomice, **Zagłębie Lubin** – 2024–
- Efthymis Koulouris – Pogoń Szczecin – 2023–26
- **Leonardo Koutris** – **Pogoń Szczecin** – 2022–
- Lazaros Lamprou – Raków Częstochowa – 2024–25
- Michalis Manias – Pogoń Szczecin – 2019–20
- Giannis Masouras – Górnik Zabrze, Miedź Legnica – 2020–21, 2022–23
- Georgios Mygas – Zagłębie Sosnowiec – 2018–19
- Giannis Mystakidis – Górnik Zabrze – 2018–19
- **Giannis Niarchos** – **Wisła Płock** – 2025–
- Giannis Papadopoulos – Cracovia – 2013–14
- Giannis Papanikolaou – Raków Częstochowa – 2020–24
- Achilleas Poungouras – Arka Gdynia – 2017–18
- **Dimitris Rallis** – **Jagiellonia Białystok** – 2025–
- **Kyriakos Savvidis** – **Wisła Płock** – 2025–
- Dimitrios Stavropoulos – Warta Poznań – 2022–24
- **Stratos Svarnas** – **Raków Częstochowa** – 2022–
- Konstantinos Triantafyllopoulos – Pogoń Szczecin, Górnik Zabrze – 2019–24
- Antonis Tsiftsis – Raków Częstochowa – 2023–24
- **Theodoros Tsirigotis** – **Górnik Zabrze** – 2025–
- Stavros Vasilantonopoulos – Górnik Zabrze – 2019–20
- Polydefkis Volanakis – Widzew Łódź – 2024–25

=== Hungary ===
- Péter Baráth – Raków Częstochowa – 2023–26
- Márton Eppel – Warta Poznań – 2023–24
- András Gosztonyi – Śląsk Wrocław – 2015–17
- Richárd Guzmics – Wisła Kraków – 2014–17
- Ádám Gyurcsó – Pogoń Szczecin – 2015–18
- Dávid Holman – Lech Poznań – 2014–16
- Tamás Kádár – Lech Poznań – 2014–17
- Ákos Kecskés – Bruk-Bet Termalica Nieciecza, Korona Kielce – 2017–18
- Gergő Kocsis – Podbeskidzie Bielsko-Biała – 2020–21
- Tamás Kulcsár – Polonia Warsaw – 2009–10
- Róbert Litauszki – Cracovia – 2016–17
- Gergő Lovrencsics – Lech Poznań – 2012–16
- Árpád Majoros – Cracovia – 2007–09
- Bence Mervó – Śląsk Wrocław – 2015–17
- **Rajmund Molnár** – **Pogoń Szczecin** – 2025–
- Dominik Nagy – Legia Warsaw – 2016–20
- Nemanja Nikolics – Legia Warsaw – 2015–17
- Soma Novothny – Ruch Chorzów – 2023–24
- **Levente Szabó** – **Zagłębie Lubin** – 2025–
- Tibor Szabó – Dyskobolia Grodzisk Wielkopolski – 2005–06
- **Attila Szalai** – **Pogoń Szczecin** – 2025–
- Mátyás Tajti – Zagłębie Lubin – 2019–20
- Márk Tamás – Śląsk Wrocław – 2019–22
- Roland Varga – Bruk-Bet Termalica Nieciecza – 2021–22
- Gábor Vayer – ŁKS Łódź – 2007–09
- Kristopher Vida – Piast Gliwice – 2019–22

=== Iceland ===
- Adam Örn Arnarson – Górnik Zabrze – 2018–19
- Böðvar Böðvarsson – Jagiellonia Białystok – 2017–21
- Daníel Leó Grétarsson – Śląsk Wrocław – 2021–23
- Davíð Kristján Ólafsson – Cracovia – 2023–26
- **Gísli Þórðarson** – **Lech Poznań** – 2024–

=== Israel ===
- Joel Abu Hanna – Legia Warsaw, Lechia Gdańsk – 2021–23
- Ravve Assayag – Stal Mielec – 2024–25
- Mohammed Awaed – Lech Poznań – 2020–21
- Aviram Baruchyan – Polonia Warsaw – 2011–13
- Dudu Biton – Wisła Kraków – 2011–12
- Liran Cohen – Podbeskidzie Bielsko-Biała – 2011–13
- Liad Elmaliach – Podbeskidzie Bielsko-Biała – 2011–12
- Oded Gavish – Śląsk Wrocław – 2013–14
- Yoav Hofmayster – Korona Kielce – 2023–25
- Dor Hugi – Wisła Kraków – 2021–22
- Tamir Kahlon – Cracovia – 2011–12
- Maor Melikson – Wisła Kraków – 2010–13 (Note: Acquired Polish citizenship in February 2011)
- Moshe Ohayon – Legia Warsaw – 2011–12
- Alon Turgeman – Wisła Kraków – 2019–20

=== Italy ===
- Massimiliano Iezzi – Polonia Warsaw – 2005–06
- Stefano Napoleoni – Widzew Łódź – 2006–08
- Joseph Dayo Oshadogan – Widzew Łódź – 2006–08
- Cristian Pasquato – Legia Warsaw – 2017–19

=== Kazakhstan ===
- Abzal Beysebekov – Korona Kielce – 2013–14
- Sergey Khizhnichenko – Korona Kielce – 2013–15
- Georgy Zhukov – Wisła Kraków, Puszcza Niepołomice – 2019–22, 2024–25

=== Kosovo ===
- David Domgjoni – Bruk-Bet Termalica Nieciecza – 2021–22
- **Dion Gallapeni** – Widzew Łódź, **Wisła Płock** – 2025–
- Xhevdet Gela – Widzew Łódź – 2013–14
- Kreshnik Hajrizi – Widzew Łódź – 2024–25
- Jetmir Haliti – Jagiellonia Białystok – 2023–25
- Shpëtim Hasani – Górnik Łęczna – 2014–15
- **Florian Haxha** – **Motor Lublin** – 2025–
- Engjëll Hoti – ŁKS Łódź – 2023–24
- Lirim M. Kastrati – Legia Warsaw – 2021–23
- Lirim R. Kastrati – Widzew Łódź – 2023–25
- **Ermal Krasniqi** – Legia Warsaw – 2025–
- Florian Loshaj – Cracovia – 2019–23
- Kushtrim Munishi – Zagłębie Lubin – 1992–93
- **Bujar Pllana** – **Lechia Gdańsk** – 2024–
- Suad Sahiti – Wisła Płock – 2019–20
- Veton Tusha – Bruk-Bet Termalica Nieciecza – 2021–22
- Qëndrim Zyba – Legia Warsaw – 2023–24

=== Latvia ===
- Andrejs Cigaņiks – Widzew Łódź – 2022–24
- Aleksandrs Fertovs – Korona Kielce – 2014–16
- Vladislavs Gabovs – Korona Kielce – 2015–17
- **Vladislavs Gutkovskis** – Bruk-Bet Termalica Nieciecza, Raków Częstochowa, **Arka Gdynia** – 2015–18, 2020–23, 2025–
- Jurijs Hudjakovs – Zagłębie Lubin – 1996–97
- **Alvis Jaunzems** – Stal Mielec, **Lechia Gdańsk** – 2023–
- Vladimirs Kamešs – Pogoń Szczecin – 2014–15
- Artūrs Karašausks – Piast Gliwice – 2015–16
- Sergejs Kožans – Lechia Gdańsk – 2009–12
- Oļegs Laizāns – Lechia Gdańsk, ŁKS Łódź – 2009–10, 2011–12
- Artis Lazdiņš – Piast Gliwice – 2012–14
- Ivans Lukjanovs – Lechia Gdańsk – 2009–12
- Vitālijs Maksimenko – Bruk-Bet Termalica Nieciecza – 2017–18
- Mārcis Ošs – Górnik Zabrze – 2015–16
- Andrejs Prohorenkovs – Górnik Zabrze – 2000–01
- Deniss Rakels – Zagłębie Lubin, Cracovia, Lech Poznań – 2010–11, 2013–16, 2017–18
- Artjoms Rudņevs – Lech Poznań – 2010–12
- Roberts Savaļnieks – Jagiellonia Białystok – 2013–14
- Māris Smirnovs – Amica Wronki, Górnik Zabrze – 2004–06, 2007–09
- Pāvels Šteinbors – Górnik Zabrze, Arka Gdynia, Jagiellonia Białystok – 2013–15, 2016–22
- Igors Tarasovs – Jagiellonia Białystok, Śląsk Wrocław – 2014–16, 2017–19
- Kristers Tobers – Lechia Gdańsk – 2019–23
- Daniils Turkovs – GKS Bełchatów – 2014–15
- Aleksejs Višņakovs – Cracovia, Widzew Łódź – 2010–12, 2013–14
- Eduards Višņakovs – Widzew Łódź, Ruch Chorzów – 2013–14, 2014–17
- Jurijs Žigajevs – Widzew Łódź – 2010–12

=== Lithuania ===
- Vidas Alunderis – Zagłębie Lubin – 2004–08
- Vytautas Andriuškevičius – Lechia Gdańsk – 2010–13
- Dominykas Barauskas – Stal Mielec – 2022–23
- Džiugas Bartkus – Górnik Łęczna – 2015–16
- Vytautas Černiauskas – Korona Kielce – 2014–15
- Fedor Černych – Górnik Łęczna, Jagiellonia Białystok – 2014–18, 2020–23
- Georgas Freidgeimas – ŁKS Łódź – 2008–09
- Dominykas Galkevičius – Zagłębie Lubin – 2010–12
- Andrius Gedgaudas – Widzew Łódź – 1999–2001
- Edvinas Girdvainis – Piast Gliwice – 2016–17
- **Paulius Golubickas** – **Radomiak Radom** – 2024–
- Valdas Kasparavičius – Jagiellonia Białystok – 1989–90
- Donatas Kazlauskas – Lechia Gdańsk – 2014–15
- Tadas Kijanskas – Jagiellonia Białystok, Korona Kielce – 2010–13
- Marius Kižys – ŁKS Łódź, Górnik Zabrze – 2006–09
- Gintaras Kviliūnas – Jagiellonia Białystok – 1989–90
- Tadas Labukas – Arka Gdynia – 2009–11
- Justas Lasickas – Jagiellonia Białystok – 2018–19
- Povilas Leimonas – Widzew Łódź, Jagiellonia Białystok– 2013–15
- Pavelas Leusas – Orlen Płock – 2000–01
- Vytautas Lukša – Polonia Warsaw – 2012–13
- Povilas Lukšys – Polonia Bytom – 2009–10
- Algis Mackevičius – Jagiellonia Białystok – 1989–90
- Justinas Marazas – Wisła Płock – 2018–19
- Deivydas Matulevičius – Odra Wodzisław Śląski, Cracovia – 2008–10, 2011–12
- Gražvydas Mikulėnas – Polonia Warsaw, GKS Katowice, Wisła Płock, Ruch Chorzów – 1996–2001, 2002–04, 2007–08
- Titas Milašius – Wisła Płock – 2019–20
- Arvydas Novikovas – Jagiellonia Białystok, Legia Warsaw – 2016–20
- Paulius Paknys – Korona Kielce – 2009–10
- Mindaugas Panka – Widzew Łódź, Ruch Chorzów – 2007–08, 2010–13
- Tadas Papečkys – Korona Kielce – 2007–09
- Deimantas Petravičius – Zagłębie Lubin – 2016–17
- Robertas Poškus – Widzew Łódź, Polonia Warsaw – 1999–2001
- Aidas Preikšaitis – GKS Katowice, Stomil Olsztyn, Wisła Płock, Świt Nowy Dwór Mazowiecki – 1997–2000, 2002–04
- Arūnas Pukelevičius – Wisła Kraków – 1997–98
- Tomas Radzinevičius – Odra Wodzisław Śląski – 2009–10
- Nerijus Radžius – Zagłębie Lubin, ŁKS Łódź – 2000–03, 2008–09
- Tomas Ramelis – Stomil Olsztyn – 1998–2001
- Evaldas Razulis – Górnik Łęczna – 2014–15
- Andrius Skerla – Korona Kielce, Jagiellonia Białystok – 2007–12
- Marius Skinderis – GKS Bełchatów – 1998–99
- Artūras Steško – Widzew Łódź – 2001–02
- Igoris Steško – Widzew Łódź – 1999–2000, 2001–02
- Darvydas Šernas – Widzew Łódź, Zagłębie Lubin – 2010–13
- Dainius Šuliauskas – GKS Bełchatów – 1998–99
- Andrėjus Tereškinas – Stomil Olsztyn – 1997–98
- Artemijus Tutyškinas – ŁKS Łódź – 2023–24
- Nerijus Vasiliauskas – Wisła Płock – 2002–03
- Donatas Vencevičius – Polonia Warsaw – 1997–2000
- Raimondas Vilėniškis – Wisła Płock – 2002–04
- Emilijus Zubas – GKS Bełchatów, Podbeskidzie Bielsko-Biała – 2012–13, 2014–16
- Darius Žutautas – Świt Nowy Dwór Mazowiecki – 2003–04
- Tomas Žvirgždauskas – Polonia Warsaw, Widzew Łódź – 1996–2002

=== Luxembourg ===
- Chris Philipps – Legia Warsaw – 2017–19

=== Malta ===
- Matthew Guillaumier – Stal Mielec – 2023–25

=== Moldova ===
- Vadim Boreț – Dyskobolia Grodzisk Wielkopolski – 2004–05
- Ioan-Călin Revenco – Puszcza Niepołomice – 2023–25
- Ilie Cebanu – Wisła Kraków – 2007–08, 2009–10
- Artur Crăciun – Puszcza Niepołomice – 2023–25
- Alexandru Curtianu – Widzew Łódź – 1996–98
- Anatolie Doroș – Legia Warsaw, Polonia Warsaw, Korona Kielce – 2004–06
- Gheorghe Ovseanicov – Cracovia – 2009–10
- Sergiu Secu – Śląsk Wrocław – 2000–01
- Alexandru Suvorov – Cracovia – 2009–12

=== Montenegro ===
- Boban Aković – Śląsk Wrocław – 2000–01
- Emir Azemović – Raków Częstochowa – 2019–20
- Saša Balić – Zagłębie Lubin, Korona Kielce – 2017–23
- Veljko Batrović – Widzew Łódź – 2011–14
- Fatos Bećiraj – Wisła Kraków – 2020–21
- Žarko Belada – Wisła Płock – 2004–07
- Vladimir Boljević – Cracovia – 2010–12, 2013–14
- Marko Čolaković – Wisła Płock – 2004–07
- Marko Ćetković – Jagiellonia Białystok, Podbeskidzie Bielsko-Biała – 2011–13
- Stefan Denković – Zawisza Bydgoszcz – 2014–15
- Miloš Dragojević – Widzew Łódź – 2012–13
- Veselin Đoković – Pogoń Szczecin, Amica Wronki, Legia Warsaw, Korona Kielce – 2000–07
- Uroš Đuranović – Korona Kielce – 2019–20
- Mladen Kašćelan – ŁKS Łódź, Jagiellonia Białystok – 2007–09, 2010–12
- Damir Kojašević – Jagiellonia Białystok – 2008–09
- Dušan Lagator – Wisła Płock – 2020–22
- **Nemanja Mijušković** – Miedź Legnica, **Wisła Płock** – 2022–23, 2025–
- Željko Mrvaljević – Widzew Łódź – 2002–03
- Stefan Nikolić – Bruk-Bet Termalica Nieciecza – 2015–16
- Dejan Ognjanović – ŁKS Łódź – 2008–09
- Luka Pejović – Jagiellonia Białystok – 2010–13
- Željko Perović – Zagłębie Lubin – 2004–05
- Milan Radulović – GKS Bełchatów – 2005–06
- Filip Raičević – Śląsk Wrocław – 2019–20
- **Slobodan Rubežić** – **Korona Kielce** – 2025–
- Vukan Savićević – Wisła Kraków – 2018–20
- Ermin Seratlić – Jagiellonia Białystok – 2010–12
- Aleksandar Šćekić – Zagłębie Lubin – 2021–22
- Pavle Velimirović – ŁKS Łódź – 2011–12
- Marko Vešović – Legia Warsaw – 2017–21
- Vladimir Volkov – Lech Poznań – 2015–16
- Nikola Vujadinović – Lech Poznań – 2017–19
- Predrag Vujović – Wisła Płock – 2004–06

=== Netherlands ===
- Pelle van Amersfoort – Cracovia – 2019–22
- Fred Benson – Lechia Gdańsk – 2011–12
- Koen van der Biezen – Cracovia – 2011–12
- **Jesse Bosch** – **GKS Katowice** – 2025–
- Marciano Bruma – Arka Gdynia, Lech Poznań – 2010–12
- Mick van Buren – Cracovia – 2024–25
- Bert Esselink – Stal Mielec – 2023–25
- Anton Fase – ŁKS Łódź – 2023–24
- Mickey van der Hart – Lech Poznań – 2019–22
- **Bradly van Hoeven** – **Motor Lublin** – 2024–
- Kew Jaliens – Wisła Kraków – 2010–13
- Collins John – Piast Gliwice – 2013–14
- Joeri de Kamps – Lechia Gdańsk – 2022–23
- Michael Lamey – Wisła Kraków – 2011–12
- Aschraf El Mahdioui – Wisła Kraków – 2021–22
- Elvis Manu – Wisła Kraków – 2021–22
- Luciano Narsingh – Miedź Legnica – 2022–23
- Fabian Serrarens – Arka Gdynia – 2019–20
- Hesdey Suart – Cracovia – 2010–12
- Kay Tejan – ŁKS Łódź – 2023–24
- Desley Ubbink – Podbeskidzie Bielsko-Biała – 2020–21
- Marko Vejinović – Arka Gdynia – 2019–20
- Johan Voskamp – Śląsk Wrocław – 2011–13

=== North Macedonia ===
- Stefan Ashkovski – Górnik Łęczna – 2016–17
- Jani Atanasov – Cracovia, Puszcza Niepołomice – 2022–26
- Aleksandar Bajevski – Górnik Łęczna – 2006–07
- Darko Churlinov – Jagiellonia Białystok – 2024–25
- Vlado Danilov – Polonia Warsaw – 2002–03
- Enis Fazlagikj – Wisła Kraków – 2021–22
- Marjan Gerasimovski – Legia Warsaw – 2001–02
- Dejan Iliev – Jagiellonia Białystok – 2019–20
- Filip Ivanovski – Dyskobolia Grodzisk Wielkopolski, Polonia Warsaw – 2006–10
- Mirko Ivanovski – Arka Gdynia – 2010–11
- Tihomir Kostadinov – Piast Gliwice – 2021–25
- Panče Ḱumbev – Dyskobolia Grodzisk Wielkopolski, Legia Warsaw – 2004–10
- Vlade Lazarevski – Dyskobolia Grodzisk Wielkopolski, Polonia Warsaw – 2005–09
- Borche Manevski – Górnik Łęczna – 2005–07
- Ǵoko Petruševski – Lech Poznań – 1997–98
- Goran Popov – Odra Wodzisław Śląski – 2004–05
- Ostoja Stjepanović – Wisła Kraków, Śląsk Wrocław – 2013–15, 2016–17
- Aco Stojkov – Górnik Zabrze – 2003–04
- Zlatko Tanevski – Lech Poznań, GKS Bełchatów – 2006–12
- Aleksandar Todorovski – Polonia Warsaw, Zagłębie Lubin – 2011–13, 2015–18
- David Toshevski – Górnik Zabrze – 2021–22
- Ivan Trichkovski – Legia Warsaw – 2015–16
- Yani Urdinov – Widzew Łódź – 2013–14

=== Norway ===
- **Jonatan Braut Brunes** – **Raków Częstochowa** – 2024–
- **Christopher Cheng** – **Widzew Łódź** – 2025–
- Vidar Evensen – Widzew Łódź – 2000–01
- **Bryan Fiabema** – **Lech Poznań** – 2024–
- Torgil Gjertsen – Wisła Płock – 2019–21
- Kristoffer Normann Hansen – Widzew Łódź, Jagiellonia Białystok – 2022–25
- Kenneth Karlsen – Widzew Łódź – 2000–01
- Muhamed Keita – Lech Poznań – 2014–15
- Fredrik Krogstad – Korona Kielce – 2023–24
- **Sondre Liseth** – **Górnik Zabrze** – 2024–
- **Eman Markovic** – **GKS Katowice** – 2025–
- **Marius Olsen** – **GKS Katowice** – 2025–
- Thomas Rogne – Lech Poznań – 2018–22
- Harmeet Singh – Wisła Płock – 2016–17
- Henrik Udahl – Śląsk Wrocław – 2024–25
- **Fredrik Ulvestad** – **Pogoń Szczecin** – 2023–
- Kristoffer Velde – Lech Poznań – 2021–25

=== Portugal ===
- Salvador Agra – Legia Warsaw – 2018–20
- Alvarinho – Zawisza Bydgoszcz, Jagiellonia Białystok, Śląsk Wrocław – 2013–17
- Tiago Alves – Piast Gliwice – 2019–22
- João Amaral – Lech Poznań – 2018–20, 2021–23
- **Henrique Arreiol** – **Legia Warsaw** – 2025–
- Augusto – Śląsk Wrocław – 2016–19
- Rafael Barbosa – Radomiak Radom – 2024–25
- **Romário Baró** – **Radomiak Radom** – 2025–
- Cafú – Legia Warsaw – 2017–20
- David Caiado – Zagłębie Lubin – 2009–10
- Carlitos – Wisła Płock – 2018–19
- Ivan Cavaleiro – Stal Mielec – 2024–25
- Manuel Curto – Zagłębie Lubin – 2013–14
- Gil Dias – Legia Warsaw – 2023–24
- Fernando Dinis – Zagłębie Lubin – 2009–11
- **Matchoi Djaló** – **Wisła Płock** – 2025–
- João Gamboa – Pogoń Szczecin – 2023–25
- Rui Gomes – Legia Warsaw – 2021–22
- José Gomes – Lechia Gdańsk – 2019–20
- Tiago Gomes – Zagłębie Lubin – 2007–08
- **Claude Gonçalves** – **Legia Warsaw** – 2024–
- Filipe Gonçalves – Śląsk Wrocław – 2016–17
- Alexandre Guedes – Raków Częstochowa – 2021–22
- Paulo Henrique – Radomiak Radom – 2024–25
- **Marian Huja** – **Pogoń Szczecin** – 2025–
- Bruno Jordão – Radomiak Radom – 2023–26
- Josué – Legia Warsaw – 2021–24
- **Ivan Lima** – **Piast Gliwice** – 2025–
- Rafael Lopes – Cracovia, Legia Warsaw – 2019–22
- Miguel Luís – Raków Częstochowa, Warta Poznań – 2021–24
- Luís Machado – Radomiak Radom – 2021–24
- Zé Manuel – Wisła Kraków – 2017–18
- Manú – Legia Warsaw – 2010–12
- André Martins – Legia Warsaw – 2018–22
- Luís Mata – Pogoń Szczecin, Zagłębie Lubin – 2020–25
- Tiago Matos – Radomiak Radom – 2021–24
- Iuri Medeiros – Legia Warsaw – 2018–19
- Mica – Zawisza Bydgoszcz – 2014–15
- André Micael – Zawisza Bydgoszcz – 2013–15
- Rui Miguel – Zagłębie Lubin – 2006–08
- Elton Monteiro – Miedź Legnica – 2018–19
- **Guilherme Montóia** – **Jagiellonia Białystok** – 2025–
- **João Moutinho** – Jagiellonia Białystok, **Lech Poznań** – 2024–
- Filipe Nascimento – Radomiak Radom, Górnik Zabrze – 2021–25
- Nené – Jagiellonia Białystok – 2022–25
- Miguel Nóbrega – Piast Gliwice – 2024–25
- Fábio Nunes – Widzew Łódź – 2022–25
- João Nunes – Lechia Gdańsk – 2016–19
- Pedro Nuno – Korona Kielce – 2024–25
- Flávio Paixão – Śląsk Wrocław, Lechia Gdańsk – 2013–23
- Marco Paixão – Śląsk Wrocław, Lechia Gdańsk – 2013–18
- **Joel Pereira** – **Lech Poznań** – 2021–
- Bruno Pinheiro – Widzew Łódź – 2010–12
- Hélio Pinto – Legia Warsaw – 2013–15
- Tomás Podstawski – Pogoń Szczecin, Ruch Chorzów – 2018–21, 2023–24
- Rabiola – Piast Gliwice – 2013–14
- Francisco Ramos – Radomiak Radom – 2022–23, 2024–25
- Pedro Rebocho – Lech Poznań – 2021–23
- Yuri Ribeiro – Legia Warsaw – 2021–24
- **Leonardo Rocha** – Radomiak Radom, **Raków Częstochowa**, Zagłębie Lubin – 2022–
- Luís Rocha – Legia Warsaw, Cracovia – 2018–22
- **Ivo Rodrigues** – **Motor Lublin** – 2025–
- **Fábio Ronaldo** – **Motor Lublin** – 2025–
- Rafa Santos – Stal Mielec – 2023–24
- **Leandro Sanca** – **Piast Gliwice** – 2025–
- Orlando Sá – Legia Warsaw – 2013–15
- Gonçalo Silva – Radomiak Radom – 2021–22
- Joshua Silva – Zawisza Bydgoszcz – 2014–15
- Luís Silva – Widzew Łódź – 2023–25
- Tomás Silva – Jagiellonia Białystok – 2024–25
- Edi Semedo – Radomiak Radom, Jagiellonia Białystok – 2023–25
- Afonso Sousa – Lech Poznań – 2022–25
- Fábio Sturgeon – Raków Częstochowa – 2021–23
- **Tomás Tavares** – **Wisła Płock** – 2025–
- Pedro Tiba – Lech Poznań – 2018–22
- Tiago Valente – Lechia Gdańsk – 2014–15
- Bernardo Vasconcelos – Zawisza Bydgoszcz – 2013–15
- Diogo Verdasca – Śląsk Wrocław – 2021–23
- **Rúben Vinagre** – **Legia Warsaw** – 2024–
- **Bernardo Vital** – **Jagiellonia Białystok** – 2025–

=== Republic of Ireland ===
- Cillian Sheridan – Jagiellonia Białystok, Wisła Płock – 2016–21

=== Romania ===
- Marcel Băban – Ruch Chorzów – 2000–01
- Tudor Băluță – Śląsk Wrocław – 2024–25
- Florin Bejan – Cracovia – 2015–17
- Alexandru Benga – Sandecja Nowy Sącz – 2017–18
- **Radu Boboc** – **Bruk-Bet Termalica Nieciecza** – 2025–
- Marius Briceag – Korona Kielce – 2022–24
- Hristu Chiacu – Wisła Kraków – 2006–07
- Andrei Chindriș – Lechia Gdańsk – 2024–25
- **Valentin Cojocaru** – **Pogoń Szczecin** – 2023–
- Ronaldo Deaconu – Korona Kielce – 2022–24
- Emilian Dolha – Wisła Kraków, Lech Poznań – 2006–08
- Marco Ehmann – Stal Mielec – 2023–24
- Virgil Ghiță – Cracovia – 2021–25
- Ion Gheorghe – Stal Mielec – 2023–24
- Sergiu Hanca – Cracovia – 2018–22
- **Otto Hindrich** – **Legia Warsaw** – 2025–
- Gabriel Iancu – Bruk-Bet Termalica Nieciecza – 2017–18
- Gabriel Matei – Górnik Łęczna, Bruk-Bet Termalica Nieciecza – 2016–18
- Paul Pîrvulescu – Wisła Płock – 2017–18
- Cornel Predescu – Zawisza Bydgoszcz – 2014–15
- Cristian Pulhac – Zawisza Bydgoszcz – 2014–15
- Florin Purece – Bruk-Bet Termalica Nieciecza – 2017–18
- **Bogdan Racovițan** – **Raków Częstochowa** – 2021–
- Mihai Răduț – Lech Poznań – 2016–19
- Cornel Râpă – Pogoń Szczecin, Cracovia – 2016–24
- Antonio Sefer – Motor Lublin – 2024–25
- Deian Sorescu – Raków Częstochowa – 2021–24
- János Székely – Korona Kielce – 2012–13
- Bogdan Țîru – Jagiellonia Białystok, Warta Poznań – 2019–24
- Norbert Varga – Wisła Kraków – 2005–07

=== Russia ===
- Pavel Akimov – Legia Warsaw – 1927–30, 1934, 1936 (Note: Acquired Polish citizenship in 1937)
- Yevgeni Bashkirov – Zagłębie Lubin – 2019–22
- Sergei Basov – Śląsk Wrocław – 1992–93
- Soslan Dzhanayev – Miedź Legnica – 2018–19
- Aleksandr Gitselov – Zagłębie Lubin – 1991–92
- Roland Gigolayev – Ruch Chorzów – 2013–16
- Sergei Golyatkin – Polonia Warsaw – 2012–13
- Vladimir Grechnyov – Śląsk Wrocław – 1990–92
- Alexander Kanishchev – Legia Warsaw – 1991–92
- Dmitri Klabukov – Zagłębie Lubin – 2002–03
- Vladimir Kobzev – Polonia Warsaw – 1993–94
- Pavel Komolov – GKS Bełchatów – 2010–11, 2014–15
- Oleg Kononov – Ruch Chorzów – 1994–95
- Igor Lyakhov – Sokół Pniewy – 1993–94
- Sergei Mikhailov – Motor Lublin – 1990–92
- Roman Oreshchuk – Legia Warsaw – 1995–97
- Vadim Rogovskoy – Zagłębie Lubin, GKS Bełchatów – 1991–97
- Kirill Rybakov – Stomil Olsztyn – 1995–97
- Zaur Sadayev – Lechia Gdańsk, Lech Poznań – 2013–15
- Oleg Salenko – Pogoń Szczecin – 2000–01
- Serder Serderov – Cracovia – 2018–19
- Sergei Shestakov – Legia Warsaw – 1991–93
- Serhiy Shipovskiy – Hutnik Kraków, Pogoń Szczecin – 1991–97, 1999–2002
- Vladislav Sirotov – Zagłębie Lubin – 2018–19
- Timur Zhamaletdinov – Lech Poznań – 2018–20
- Ilya Zhigulyov – Zagłębie Lubin – 2021–22
- Maksim Zinovyev – Śląsk Wrocław – 2001–02
- Aleksey Zverev – Olimpia Poznań – 1991–92

=== Scotland ===
- Barry Douglas – Lech Poznań – 2013–16, 2021–24
- Ziggy Gordon – Jagiellonia Białystok – 2016–18

=== Serbia ===
- Miloš Adamović – Polonia Warsaw – 2010–11
- Danijel Aleksić – Lechia Gdańsk – 2014–15
- Milan Aleksić – Cracovia – 2025–26
- Zlatan Alomerović – Korona Kielce, Lechia Gdańsk, Jagiellonia Białystok – 2017–24
- Miodrag Anđelković – Widzew Łódź – 2002–03
- Filip Bainović – Górnik Zabrze – 2019–22
- Marko Bajić – Górnik Zabrze, Lechia Gdańsk – 2007–12
- Aleksandar Bjelica – Korona Kielce – 2018–19
- Saša Bogunović – Widzew Łódź – 2006–08
- Milan Bosanac – Górnik Polkowice – 2003–04
- Saša Cilinšek – Dyskobolia Grodzisk Wielkopolski – 2004–05
- Đorđe Crnomarković – Lech Poznań, Zagłębie Lubin – 2019–21
- **Aleksandar Ćirković** – **Lechia Gdańsk** – 2025–
- Bojan Čečarić – Cracovia, Korona Kielce – 2018–20
- Đorđe Čotra – Polonia Warsaw, Zagłębie Lubin, Śląsk Wrocław – 2010–14, 2015–19
- Dejan Đenić – ŁKS Łódź – 2008–09
- Dušan Đokić – Zagłębie Lubin – 2010–11
- Dejan Dražić – Zagłębie Lubin – 2019–21
- Ivan Đurđević – Lech Poznań – 2007–13
- Aleksandar Gruber – Lech Poznań – 1999–2000
- Rudi Gusnić – Legia Warsaw – 2002–03
- Dragan Ilić – Stomil Olsztyn, Górnik Zabrze – 2001–03
- **Veljko Ilić** – **Widzew Łódź** – 2025–
- Ivica Iliev – Wisła Kraków – 2011–13
- Dimitrije Injac – Lech Poznań, Polonia Warsaw – 2006–14
- Bojan Isailović – Zagłębie Lubin – 2009–12
- Goran Janković – GKS Bełchatów – 2005–06
- Milan Jovanić – Wisła Kraków – 2010–12
- Marko Jovanović – Zagłębie Lubin – 2006–07
- Marko Jovanović – Wisła Kraków – 2011–14
- Marjan Jugović – Polonia Bytom – 2008–09
- Mile Knežević – Szczakowianka Jaworzno – 2002–03
- Srđa Knežević – Legia Warsaw – 2010–11
- Miloš Kosanović – Cracovia – 2010–12, 2013–14
- Aleksandar Kovačević – Lechia Gdańsk, Śląsk Wrocław – 2015–18
- Miloš Krasić – Lechia Gdańsk – 2015–18
- Nikola Kuveljić – Wisła Kraków – 2019–22
- Nikola Leković – Lechia Gdańsk – 2013–16
- Danijel Ljuboja – Legia Warsaw – 2011–13
- Andrija Luković – Raków Częstochowa – 2019–20
- Filip Malbašić – Lechia Gdańsk – 2014–15
- Filip Marković – Śląsk Wrocław – 2019–20
- Neven Marković – Lechia Gdańsk – 2015–16
- Vanja Marković – Korona Kielce – 2012–17
- Alen Melunović – Widzew Łódź – 2013–14
- Nemanja Mihajlović – Arka Gdynia – 2019–20
- Nikola Mijailović – Wisła Kraków, Korona Kielce – 2003–07, 2009–11
- Zoran Mijanović – Legia Warsaw – 2002–03
- Vladimir Milenković – Polonia Bytom – 2009–11
- Nemanja Miletić – Korona Kielce – 2019–20
- Vanja Milinković-Savić – Lechia Gdańsk – 2015–17
- Aleksandar Miljković – Miedź Legnica – 2018–19
- **Bogdan Mirčetić** – **Raków Częstochowa** – 2025–
- Nikola Mitrović – Wisła Kraków – 2017–18
- Filip Mladenović – Lechia Gdańsk, Legia Warsaw – 2017–23
- Ognjen Mudrinski – Jagiellonia Białystok – 2019–20
- Veljko Nikitović – Górnik Łęczna – 2003–07, 2014–16
- Milan Nikolić – Polonia Warsaw – 2009–10
- Jovan Ninković – Ruch Chorzów – 2007–08 (Note: Acquired Polish citizenship on 19 March 2016)
- Ajazdin Nuhi – Legia Warsaw – 2002–03
- Milan Obradović – Wisła Płock – 2020–22
- Miroslav Opsenica – ŁKS Łódź – 2006–08
- **Radovan Pankov** – **Legia Warsaw** – 2023–
- Aleksandar Pantić – Zagłębie Lubin – 2021–22
- **Srđan Plavšić** – **Raków Częstochowa** – 2023–
- Mitar Peković – Wisła Płock – 2004–07
- Mirko Poledica – Lech Poznań, Legia Warsaw, Pogoń Szczecin – 2002–03, 2004–06
- Marko Poletanović – Jagiellonia Białystok, Raków Częstochowa, Wisła Kraków, Zagłębie Lubin – 2018–24
- Pavle Popara – Pogoń Szczecin – 2013–14
- Uroš Predić – Orlen Płock – 2000–01
- Aleksandar Prijović – Legia Warsaw – 2015–17
- Andreja Prokić – GKS Bełchatów, Stal Mielec – 2014–15, 2020–21 (Note: Acquired Polish citizenship in March 2018)
- Vasilije Prodanović – Polonia Bytom – 2009–10
- Uroš Radaković – Wisła Kraków – 2020–21
- Milan Radin – Korona Kielce – 2019–20
- Branko Radovanović – Wisła Kraków – 2006–07
- Miroslav Radović – Legia Warsaw – 2006–15, 2016–19 (Note: Acquired Polish citizenship on 17 December 2013)
- Branko Rašić – Świt Nowy Dwór Mazowiecki – 2003–04
- Milan Rundić – Podbeskidzie Bielsko-Biała, Raków Częstochowa – 2020–25
- Vladimir Sandulović – Górnik Łęczna – 2006–07
- Mile Savković – Jagiellonia Białystok – 2018–20
- Aleksandar Sedlar – Piast Gliwice – 2016–19
- Vuk Sotirović – Jagiellonia Białystok, Śląsk Wrocław – 2007–2011
- Sreten Sretenović – Zagłębie Lubin, Cracovia – 2007–08, 2009–10, 2014–16
- Dragoljub Srnić – Śląsk Wrocław, ŁKS Łódź – 2017–18, 2019–20
- Alen Stevanović – Wisła Płock – 2018–20
- Nikola Stojiljković – Piast Gliwice – 2021–22
- Andraš Strapak – GKS Katowice – 2000–01
- Stanko Svitlica – Legia Warsaw, Wisła Kraków – 2001–04, 2006–07
- Stefan Šćepović – Jagiellonia Białystok – 2018–19
- Davor Tasić – Świt Nowy Dwór Mazowiecki – 2003–04
- Nemanja Tekijaški – Bruk-Bet Termalica Nieciecza – 2021–22
- Vojo Ubiparip – Lech Poznań, Górnik Łęczna – 2010–15, 2016–17
- Žarko Udovičić – Zagłębie Sosnowiec, Lechia Gdańsk, Raków Częstochowa – 2018–2022
- Mićo Vranješ – Dyskobolia Grodzisk Wielkopolski – 2004–06
- Ljubiša Vukelja – Śląsk Wrocław – 2010–11
- Dragomir Vukobratović – Górnik Łęczna – 2016–17
- Aleksandar Vuković – Legia Warsaw, Korona Kielce – 2001–13 (Note: Since 1st round of 2008–09 season player considered as Polish citizen)
- Nenad Zečević – Widzew Łódź – 2006–07
- Nebojša Živković – Wisła Płock – 2005–07

=== Slovakia ===
- Martin Adamec – Jagiellonia Białystok – 2018–19
- Peter Babnič – Dyskobolia Grodzisk Wielkopolski – 2007–08
- Filip Balaj – Cracovia – 2021–23
- Vladimír Balát – Górnik Zabrze – 2010–11
- Juraj Baláž – Polonia Bytom – 2009–10
- Pavol Baláž – Ruch Chorzów – 2007–10
- Martin Baran – Polonia Warsaw, Jagiellonia Białystok – 2012–16
- Miroslav Barčík – Polonia Bytom – 2009–11
- **Marek Bartoš** – **Motor Lublin** – 2024–
- Marek Bažík – Polonia Bytom – 2007–11
- Vladimír Bednár – Zagłębie Sosnowiec – 2007–08
- Lukáš Bielák – Górnik Łęczna – 2014–16
- **Tomáš Bobček** – **Lechia Gdańsk** – 2024–
- Miroslav Božok – Arka Gdynia, GKS Bełchatów, Górnik Łęczna – 2009–13, 2014–15, 2016–17
- Martin Bukata – Piast Gliwice – 2015–18
- **Adrián Chovan** – **Bruk-Bet Termalica Nieciecza** – 2025–
- Ján Chovanec – Ruch Chorzów – 2014–15
- Martin Chudý – Górnik Zabrze – 2018–21
- Pavol Cicman – Piast Gliwice – 2012–14
- Vladimír Cifranič – Odra Wodzisław Śląski – 2003–04
- Erik Čikoš – Wisła Kraków – 2010–11
- Lukáš Čmelík – Piast Gliwice – 2016–17
- Jakub Čunta – Cracovia – 2016–17
- Peter Čvirik – Lechia Gdańsk – 2008–10
- Juraj Dančík – Podbeskidzie Bielsko-Biała – 2011–13
- Vernon De Marco – Lech Poznań – 2017–19
- Róbert Demjan – Podbeskidzie Bielsko-Biała – 2011–13, 2014–16
- Milan Dimun – Cracovia – 2016–21
- Miroslav Drobňák – Dyskobolia Grodzisk Wielkopolski – 2003–04
- Ondrej Duda – Legia Warsaw – 2013–17
- Martin Fabuš – Ruch Chorzów – 2007–10
- Ján Fröhlich – GKS Bełchatów – 2005–06
- Michal Gašparík – Górnik Zabrze – 2010–12
- Roman Gergel – Górnik Zabrze, Bruk-Bet Termalica Nieciecza – 2014–18, 2021–22
- Boris Godál – Zagłębie Lubin – 2012–14
- Miroslav Gono – Wisła Płock – 2022–23
- Michal Gottwald – Legia Warsaw – 2005–07
- Peter Grajciar – Śląsk Wrocław – 2014–17
- Erik Grendel – Górnik Zabrze – 2014–16, 2017–18
- Lukáš Greššák – Zagłębie Sosnowiec – 2018–19
- Jakub Grič – Sandecja Nowy Sącz – 2017–18
- Dávid Guba – Bruk-Bet Termalica Nieciecza – 2016–18
- Ľubomír Guldan – Zagłębie Lubin – 2013–14, 2015–21
- Michal Hanek – Polonia Bytom, Zagłębie Lubin – 2010–12
- Ľuboš Hanzel – Jagiellonia Białystok – 2012–13
- Lukáš Haraslín – Lechia Gdańsk – 2015–20
- Ivan Hodúr – Zagłębie Lubin – 2011–12
- **Dominik Holec** – Raków Częstochowa, Lech Poznań, **Piast Gliwice** – 2020–21, 2022–23, 2025–
- Jakub Holúbek – Piast Gliwice – 2019–24
- Csaba Horváth – Zagłębie Lubin, Piast Gliwice – 2010–15
- Peter Hricko – Polonia Bytom, Pogoń Szczecin – 2008–11, 2012–13
- Libor Hrdlička – Ruch Chorzów – 2016–17
- Lukáš Hroššo – Zagłębie Sosnowiec, Cracovia – 2018–24
- Tomáš Huk – Piast Gliwice – 2019–25
- Matej Ižvolt – Piast Gliwice – 2012–15
- Lukáš Janič – Korona Kielce, Podbeskidzie Bielsko-Biała – 2010–11, 2015–16
- Marián Jarabica – Cracovia – 2010–11
- Erik Jendrišek – Cracovia – 2014–17
- Róbert Jež – Górnik Zabrze, Polonia Warsaw, Zagłębie Lubin – 2010–16
- **Erik Jirka** – Górnik Zabrze, Piast Gliwice, **GKS Katowice** – 2019–20, 2024–
- Martin Juhar – Bruk-Bet Termalica Nieciecza – 2015–17
- Andrej Kadlec – Jagiellonia Białystok – 2018–21
- Ľuboš Kamenár – Śląsk Wrocław – 2016–17
- Adrián Kaprálik – Górnik Zabrze – 2023–24
- Marián Kelemen – Śląsk Wrocław, Jagiellonia Białystok – 2009–14, 2016–19
- Matúš Kmeť – Górnik Zabrze – 2024–26
- Kristián Kolčák – Podbeskidzie Bielsko-Biała – 2014–16
- Daniel Kosmeľ – Raków Częstochowa, Ruch Radzionków – 1997–98, 2000–01
- Martin Košťál – Wisła Kraków, Jagiellonia Białystok – 2017–20
- Peter Kováčik – Jagiellonia Białystok – 2024–25
- **Samuel Kováčik** – **Legia Warsaw** – 2025–
- **Samuel Kozlovský** – **Widzew Łódź** – 2024–
- Radoslav Kráľ – Polonia Bytom – 2007–09
- Dušan Kuciak – Legia Warsaw, Lechia Gdańsk, Raków Częstochowa – 2011–24
- Vladimír Kukoľ – Jagiellonia Białystok – 2011–12
- Milan Kvocera – Wisła Płock – 2022–23
- Miloš Lačný – Śląsk Wrocław – 2014–15
- Filip Lesniak – Wisła Płock – 2020–23
- Peter Lérant – Wisła Płock – 2006–07
- Filip Lukšík – Odra Wodzisław Śląski – 2009–10
- Jaroslav Machovec – Odra Wodzisław Śląski – 2008–09
- Tomáš Majtán – Górnik Zabrze – 2013–14
- Pavol Masaryk – Cracovia – 2010–11
- Róbert Mazáň – Podbeskidzie Bielsko-Biała – 2014–15
- Jaroslav Mihalík – Cracovia, Lechia Gdańsk – 2016–18, 2019–21
- Martin Mikovič – Bruk-Bet Termalica Nieciecza – 2016–18
- Patrik Mišák – Bruk-Bet Termalica Nieciecza – 2015–18
- Patrik Mráz – Śląsk Wrocław, Górnik Łęczna, Piast Gliwice, Sandecja Nowy Sącz, Zagłębie Sosnowiec – 2011–13, 2014–19
- Samuel Mráz – Zagłębie Lubin, Motor Lublin – 2020–21, 2024–25
- Ján Mucha – Legia Warsaw, Bruk-Bet Termalica Nieciecza – 2006–10, 2017–18
- Matej Náther – Podbeskidzie Bielsko-Biała – 2011–13
- Erik Pačinda – Korona Kielce – 2019–20
- Patrik Pavlenda – Górnik Zabrze – 2007–09
- Marek Penksa – Wisła Kraków – 2005–07
- Dušan Perniš – Pogoń Szczecin – 2012–13
- Boris Peškovič – Świt Nowy Dwór Mazowiecki, Pogoń Szczecin, Górnik Zabrze – 2003–08, 2011–12
- Michal Peškovič – Polonia Bytom, Ruch Chorzów, Podbeskidzie Bielsko-Biała, Korona Kielce, Cracovia – 2007–09, 2010–13, 2014–15, 2016–21
- Jozef Piaček – Podbeskidzie Bielsko-Biała – 2015–16
- Róbert Pich – Śląsk Wrocław, Legia Warsaw – 2013–23
- Branislav Pindroch – Raków Częstochowa – 2020–21
- Michal Piter-Bučko – Podbeskidzie Bielsko-Biała, Sandecja Nowy Sącz – 2012–13, 2017–18
- **František Plach** – **Piast Gliwice** – 2018–
- Dalibor Pleva – Bruk-Bet Termalica Nieciecza – 2015–17
- Peter Pokorný – Śląsk Wrocław – 2023–25
- Martin Polaček – Zagłębie Lubin, Podbeskidzie Bielsko-Biała – 2015–18, 2020–21
- Andrej Porázik – Dyskobolia Grodzisk Wielkopolski – 2004–06
- Roman Procházka – Górnik Zabrze – 2019–21
- Matúš Putnocký – Ruch Chorzów, Lech Poznań, Śląsk Wrocław – 2014–22
- **Henrich Ravas** – Widzew Łódź, **Cracovia** – 2022–
- Dobrivoj Rusov – Piast Gliwice – 2014–15, 2016–18
- Ladislav Rybánsky – Podbeskidzie Bielsko-Biała – 2013–14
- Boris Sekulić – Górnik Zabrze – 2018–20, 2022–24
- Michal Sipľak – Cracovia, Górnik Zabrze, Puszcza Niepołomice – 2017–25
- Anton Sloboda – Podbeskidzie Bielsko-Biała – 2012–16
- Roman Sloboda – Zagłębie Lubin – 2011–12
- Pavol Staňo – Polonia Bytom, Jagiellonia Białystok, Korona Kielce, Podbeskidzie Bielsko-Biała, Bruk-Bet Termalica Nieciecza – 2007–17
- Miroslav Stoch – Zagłębie Lubin – 2020–21
- Gábor Straka – Ruch Chorzów – 2007–13
- Ľubomír Šatka – Lech Poznań – 2019–23
- Peter Šinglár – Wisła Kraków – 2008–10
- Michal Škvarka – Wisła Kraków – 2021–22
- Samuel Štefánik – Podbeskidzie Bielsko-Biała, Bruk-Bet Termalica Nieciecza – 2015–18, 2021–22
- Martin Šulek – Wisła Płock – 2022–23
- Dalibor Takáč – Korona Kielce – 2022–24
- Martin Tóth – Zagłębie Sosnowiec – 2018–19
- Ivan Trabalík – Wisła Kraków – 2001–02
- Ľubomír Tupta – Wisła Kraków, Widzew Łódź – 2019–20, 2024–25
- Alexander Tyč – Amica Wronki – 1996–97
- Rudolf Urban – Piast Gliwice, Podbeskidzie Bielsko-Biała – 2012–14
- Kristián Vallo – Wisła Płock – 2020–23
- Marcel Vasiľ – Bruk-Bet Termalica Nieciecza – 2021–22
- Blažej Vaščák – Polonia Bytom – 2010–11
- Stanislav Velický – Odra Wodzisław Śląski – 2009–10
- Tomáš Vestenický – Cracovia – 2015–18, 2019–21
- Ján Vlasko – Zagłębie Lubin – 2015–17
- **Matúš Vojtko** – **Lechia Gdańsk** – 2025–
- Richard Zajac – Podbeskidzie Bielsko-Biała – 2011–15
- Ján Zápotoka – Lech Poznań – 2009–11
- **Adam Zreľák** – Warta Poznań, **GKS Katowice** – 2020–

=== Slovenia ===
- Roman Bezjak – Jagiellonia Białystok – 2017–19
- Damjan Bohar – Zagłębie Lubin – 2018–21, 2022–24
- Miha Blažič – Lech Poznań – 2023–24
- Elvis Bratanović – Bruk-Bet Termalica Nieciecza – 2015–16
- Goran Cvijanović – Korona Kielce, Arka Gdynia – 2017–20
- Elvedin Džinić – Zagłębie Lubin – 2013–14
- Rok Elsner – Śląsk Wrocław – 2010–13
- Matic Fink – Cracovia – 2017–18
- Marko Grižonič – Wisła Płock – 2005–07
- **Erik Janža** – **Górnik Zabrze** – 2019–
- Boban Jović – Wisła Kraków, Śląsk Wrocław – 2014–18
- Dejan Kelhar – Legia Warsaw – 2010–11
- Rok Kidrič – Puszcza Niepołomice – 2023–25
- Andraž Kirm – Wisła Kraków – 2009–13
- Andrej Komac – Ruch Chorzów – 2010–12
- Uroš Korun – Piast Gliwice – 2015–20
- Denis Kramar – Widzew Łódź – 2012–13
- Blaž Kramer – Legia Warsaw – 2022–25
- Egzon Kryeziu – Lechia Gdańsk – 2019–22
- **Mitja Ilenič** – **Raków Częstochowa** – 2025–
- Dejan Lazarević – Jagiellonia Białystok – 2017–18
- Amadej Maroša – Górnik Zabrze – 2022–23
- Žan Medved – Wisła Kraków – 2020–21
- Nemanja Mitrović – Jagiellonia Białystok – 2017–20
- Matej Palčič – Wisła Kraków – 2017–19
- Denis Popović – Wisła Kraków – 2015–17
- Matej Pučko – Korona Kielce – 2018–20
- **Žan Rogelj** – **Wisła Płock** – 2025–
- **Beno Selan** – **Cracovia** – 2025–
- Rok Sirk – Zagłębie Lubin – 2019–21
- Dalibor Stevanović – Śląsk Wrocław – 2011–14
- **Petar Stojanović** – **Legia Warsaw** – 2025–
- **Dušan Stojinović** – **Jagiellonia Białystok** – 2022–
- Andraž Struna – Cracovia – 2010–12
- **Tamar Svetlin** – **Korona Kielce** – 2025–
- Matija Širok – Jagiellonia Białystok – 2015–16
- Rok Štraus – Cracovia – 2011–12, 2013–14
- Marko Šuler – Legia Warsaw – 2012–14
- Luka Šušnjara – Wisła Płock – 2020–22
- David Tijanić – Raków Częstochowa – 2019–21
- **Gašper Tratnik** – **Motor Lublin** – 2024–
- Benjamin Verbič – Legia Warsaw – 2021–22
- Tadej Vidmajer – ŁKS Łódź – 2019–20
- Dejan Vokić – Zagłębie Sosnowiec – 2018–19
- Blaž Vrhovec – Górnik Zabrze – 2022–23
- Luka Zahović – Pogoń Szczecin, Górnik Zabrze – 2020–26
- Saša Živec – Piast Gliwice, Zagłębie Lubin – 2014–18, 2019–23

=== Spain ===
- Dani Abalo – Korona Kielce – 2016–18
- **Antoñín** – **Korona Kielce** – 2025–
- **Fran Álvarez** – **Widzew Łódź** – 2023–
- Jonathan de Amo – Widzew Łódź, Miedź Legnica, Stal Mielec, Górnik Łęczna – 2013–14, 2018–19, 2020–22
- Andreu – Polonia Warsaw, Lechia Gdańsk – 2009–11, 2012–13
- Igor Angulo – Górnik Zabrze – 2017–20
- Dani Aquino – Piast Gliwice – 2019–20
- Mikel Arruabarrena – Legia Warsaw – 2008–09
- Iñaki Astiz – Legia Warsaw – 2007–15, 2017–20
- Jon Aurtenetxe – Miedź Legnica – 2022–23
- Gerard Badía – Piast Gliwice – 2013–21
- **Ángel Baena** – **Widzew Łódź** – 2025–
- Sergio Barcia – Legia Warsaw – 2024–25
- Airam Cabrera – Korona Kielce, Cracovia, Wisła Płock – 2015–16, 2018–19, 2020–21
- Alejandro Cantero – Jagiellonia Białystok – 2025–26
- Carlitos – Wisła Kraków, Legia Warsaw – 2017–20, 2022–23
- Berto Cayarga – Radomiak Radom – 2022–24
- Juan Cámara – Miedź Legnica, Jagiellonia Białystok – 2018–21, 2022–23
- Chuca – Wisła Kraków, Miedź Legnica – 2019–21, 2022–23
- Alberto Cifuentes – Piast Gliwice – 2014–15
- Roberto Corral – Korona Kielce – 2022–23
- Samuel Corral – ŁKS Łódź – 2019–20
- Fran Cruz – Miedź Legnica – 2018–19
- Fernando Cuerda – Piast Gliwice – 2012–13
- Julián Cuesta – Wisła Kraków – 2017–18
- **Adrián Dalmau** – Korona Kielce, **Piast Gliwice** – 2023–
- Davo – Wisła Płock – 2022–23
- Iñaki Descarga – Legia Warsaw – 2008–09
- **Adrián Diéguez** – Jagiellonia Białystok, **Radomiak Radom** – 2023–
- Dioni – Lech Poznań – 2018–19
- Antonio Domínguez – ŁKS Łódź – 2019–20
- Elady – Cracovia – 2018–19
- **Edu Espiau** – **Arka Gdynia** – 2025–
- Erik Expósito – Śląsk Wrocław – 2019–24
- Borja Fernández – Miedź Legnica – 2018–19
- Luis Fernández – Wisła Kraków – 2021–22
- Fernán Ferreiroa – Jagiellonia Białystok – 2020–21
- **Jorge Félix** – **Piast Gliwice** – 2018–20, 2022–
- **Borja Galán** – **GKS Katowice** – 2024–
- Ángel García – Wisła Płock – 2018–21
- Nando García – Arka Gdynia – 2019–20
- Víctor García – Śląsk Wrocław – 2021–23
- Iván González – Wisła Kraków – 2016–18
- Mario González – Lech Poznań – 2024–25
- Marc Gual – Jagiellonia Białystok, Legia Warsaw – 2022–25
- Iker Guarrotxena – Pogoń Szczecin – 2018–20
- **Sergio Guerrero** – **Bruk-Bet Termalica Nieciecza** – 2025–
- **Kike Hermoso** – **Arka Gdynia** – 2025–
- Javi Hernández – Górnik Łęczna, Cracovia – 2016–19
- Juan Ibiza – Widzew Łódź – 2023–25
- **Jesús Imaz** – Wisła Kraków, **Jagiellonia Białystok** – 2017–
- **Carlos Isaac** – **Widzew Łódź** – 2025–
- Isidoro – Polonia Warsaw – 2012–13
- **Jesús Jiménez** – Górnik Zabrze, **Bruk-Bet Termalica Nieciecza** – 2018–22, 2025–
- **Jime** – **Wisła Płock** – 2025–
- **Josema** – Ruch Chorzów, **Górnik Zabrze** – 2023–
- Josu – Górnik Łęczna – 2014–15
- **Juande** – **Piast Gliwice** – 2025–
- Juanito – Śląsk Wrocław – 2013–15
- Álvaro Jurado – Piast Gliwice – 2012–13
- Rubén Jurado – Piast Gliwice, Arka Gdynia – 2012–15, 2017–18
- **Nahuel Leiva** – Śląsk Wrocław, **Jagiellonia Białystok** – 2022–
- Marc Llinares – Śląsk Wrocław – 2024–25
- Pol Llonch – Wisła Kraków – 2016–18
- Rubén Lobato – Górnik Łęczna – 2021–22
- **Sergio Lozano** – **Jagiellonia Białystok** – 2025–
- **Ivi López** – **Raków Częstochowa** – 2020–
- Higinio Marín – Górnik Zabrze – 2021–22
- Marquitos – Górnik Łęczna, Miedź Legnica – 2015–16, 2018–19
- Iván Martín – Podbeskidzie Bielsko-Biała – 2020–21
- Carles Martínez – Piast Gliwice – 2013–15
- Iván Márquez – Korona Kielce, Cracovia – 2018–21
- Nacho Monsalve – ŁKS Łódź – 2023–24
- Carlos Moros Gracia – ŁKS Łódź – 2019–20
- Juan Muñoz – Zagłębie Lubin – 2023–24
- Miguel Muñoz – Piast Gliwice – 2021–25
- José Naranjo – Jagiellonia Białystok – 2023–24
- **Marc Navarro** – **Arka Gdynia** – 2025–
- **Nono** – **Korona Kielce** – 2022–
- Nacho Novo – Legia Warsaw – 2011–12
- Koldo Obieta – Miedź Legnica – 2022–23
- Gerard Oliva – Cracovia – 2018–19
- Armiche Ortega – Cracovia – 2014–15
- Arnau Ortiz – Śląsk Wrocław – 2024–25
- **Dani Pacheco** – Górnik Zabrze, **Wisła Płock** – 2021–24, 2025–
- Miguel Palanca – Korona Kielce – 2016–17
- Diego Percan – Arka Gdynia – 2025–26
- **Luis Perea** – **Arka Gdynia** – 2025–
- Víctor Pérez – Wisła Kraków – 2017–18
- Pirulo – ŁKS Łódź – 2019–20, 2023–24
- **Alejandro Pozo** – **Jagiellonia Białystok** – 2025–
- **José Pozo** – Śląsk Wrocław, **Pogoń Szczecin** – 2024–
- Israel Puerto – Śląsk Wrocław, Jagiellonia Białystok – 2019–23
- Caye Quintana – Śląsk Wrocław – 2021–23
- Dani Quintana – Jagiellonia Białystok – 2012–15, 2021–22
- Dani Ramírez – ŁKS Łódź, Lech Poznań – 2019–22, 2023–24
- **Pau Resta** – **Korona Kielce** – 2024–
- Álvaro Rey – Arka Gdynia – 2017–18
- Sito Riera – Śląsk Wrocław – 2016–18
- Julio Rodríguez – Wisła Płock – 2020–21
- Mario Rodríguez – Warta Poznań – 2020–22
- **Pablo Rodríguez** – **Lech Poznań** – 2025–
- Joan Román – Śląsk Wrocław, Miedź Legnica – 2016–17, 2018–19
- Rubio – Cracovia – 2019–20
- Santi Samanes – Arka Gdynia – 2019–20
- **Sergi Samper** – **Motor Lublin** – 2024–
- **Pau Sans** – **Cracovia** – 2025–
- Omar Santana – Miedź Legnica – 2018–19
- Jordi Sánchez – Widzew Łódź – 2022–24
- Manu Sánchez – Górnik Zabrze – 2024–25
- Álex Serrano – Górnik Łęczna – 2021–22
- Sisi – Lech Poznań – 2015–16
- Ian Soler – Zagłębie Lubin – 2021–22
- Dani Suárez – Górnik Zabrze – 2017–19
- Tito – Legia Warsaw – 2008–09
- Alberto Toril – Piast Gliwice – 2021–23
- Álex Vallejo – Stal Mielec – 2022–23
- **Hugo Vallejo** – **Piast Gliwice** – 2025–
- Fran Vélez – Wisła Kraków – 2017–18
- Miki Villar – Jagiellonia Białystok – 2024–26
- **Ricardo Visus** – **Widzew Łódź** – 2025–

=== Sweden ===
- Alexander Abrahamsson – Zagłębie Lubin – 2024–25
- Pontus Almqvist – Pogoń Szczecin – 2022–23
- Elias Andersson – Lech Poznań – 2023–25
- Nazad Asaad – ŁKS Łódź – 2008–09
- Nicklas Bärkroth – Lech Poznań – 2017–18
- **Leo Bengtsson** – **Lech Poznań** – 2025–
- Gustav Berggren – Raków Częstochowa – 2022–25
- Doug Bergqvist – Arka Gdynia – 2019–20
- Emil Bergström – Górnik Zabrze – 2022–23
- Johan Bertilsson – Zagłębie Lubin – 2013–14
- Henrik Castegren – Lechia Gdańsk – 2022–23
- Paweł Cibicki – Pogoń Szczecin – 2020–22
- Joseph Colley – Wisła Kraków – 2021–22
- **Kevin Čustović** – **Wisła Płock** – 2025–
- Filip Dagerstål – Lech Poznań – 2022–24
- **Alex Douglas** – **Lech Poznań** – 2024–
- Ludvig Fritzson – Zagłębie Lubin – 2024–25
- **Simon Gustafson** – **Korona Kielce** – 2025–
- **Marcus Haglind-Sangré** – **Wisła Płock** – 2025–
- **Gustav Henriksson** – **Cracovia** – 2024–
- **Mikael Ishak** – **Lech Poznań** – 2020–
- Stefan Jansson – Pogoń Szczecin – 1992–93
- Mattias Johansson – Legia Warsaw – 2021–23
- Jesper Karlström – Lech Poznań – 2020–25
- **Elias Olsson** – **Lechia Gdańsk** – 2024–
- Sebastian Rajalakso – Jagiellonia Białystok – 2013–14
- Sebastian Ring – Wisła Kraków – 2021–22
- Ivo Vazgeč – Śląsk Wrocław – 2009–10
- **Linus Wahlqvist** – **Pogoń Szczecin** – 2022–
- **Patrik Wålemark** – **Lech Poznań** – 2024–
- Karl Wendt – Lechia Gdańsk – 2024–25

=== Switzerland ===
- **Roberto Alves** – **Radomiak Radom** – 2022–
- Marco Burch – Legia Warsaw, Radomiak Radom – 2023–26
- **Maxime Dominguez** – Miedź Legnica, **Cracovia** – 2022–23, 2025–
- Junior Eyamba – Śląsk Wrocław – 2024–25
- Levent Gülen – Miedź Legnica, ŁKS Łódź – 2022–24
- Darko Jevtić – Lech Poznań – 2014–20
- Robin Kamber – Górnik Zabrze – 2022–23
- **João Oliveira** – Lechia Gdańsk, **Arka Gdynia** – 2017–18, 2025–
- Filip Stojilković – **Cracovia** – 2025–26
- **Andi Zeqiri** – **Widzew Łódź** – 2025–

=== Turkey ===
- Sinan Bakış – Górnik Zabrze – 2024–25
- Nadir Çiftçi – Pogoń Szczecin – 2016–17
- Enis Destan – Warta Poznań – 2022–23
- İlkay Durmuş – Lechia Gdańsk – 2021–23
- Burak İnce – Śląsk Wrocław – 2023–25

=== Ukraine ===
- Ruslan Babenko – Raków Częstochowa – 2019–20
- Denys Balanyuk – Wisła Kraków – 2017–18, 2019–20
- Vitaliy Balashov – Wisła Kraków – 2015–16
- Dmytro Bashlay – Podbeskidzie Bielsko-Biała – 2020–21
- Andriy Bohdanov – Arka Gdynia – 2017–19
- Serhiy Buletsa – Zagłębie Lubin, Lechia Gdańsk – 2023–25
- Bohdan Butko – Lech Poznań – 2019–21
- Oleksandr Chornyavskyi – Zagłębie Lubin – 1996–97
- Andriy Danayev – GKS Bełchatów – 1998–99
- Anatoliy Demyanenko – Widzew Łódź – 1991–92
- Yevhen Demydenko – Zagłębie Sosnowiec – 2007–08
- Oleh Derevinskyi – Wisła Kraków – 1991–93
- Andriy Dombrovskyi – Bruk-Bet Termalica Nieciecza – 2021–22
- **Maksym Dyachuk** – **Lechia Gdańsk** – 2025–
- Oleksiy Dytyatyev – Cracovia – 2017–20
- Vitaliy Hemeha – Wisła Płock – 2016–17
- Oleh Horin – Jagiellonia Białystok – 2019–20
- Valeriy Hoshkoderya – Stal Stalowa Wola – 1991–92
- Roman Hryhorchuk – Petrochemia Płock – 1994–95
- Andriy Hryshchenko – Górnik Zabrze, Stomil Olsztyn, Górnik Łęczna, Arka Gdynia – 1996–98, 2003–04, 2005–07
- Lyubomyr Ivanskyi – Wisła Płock – 2006–07
- Anton Kanibolotskyi – Miedź Legnica – 2018–19
- Ihor Kharatin – Legia Warsaw – 2021–23
- **Maksym Khlan** – Lechia Gdańsk, **Górnik Zabrze** – 2024–
- Oleksiy Khoblenko – Lech Poznań – 2017–18
- Dmytro Khomchenovskyi – Jagiellonia Białystok – 2016–18
- **Vladyslav Kocherhin** – **Raków Częstochowa** – 2021–
- Ruslan Kolokolov – Igloopol Dębica – 1991–92
- Yevhen Konoplyanka – Cracovia – 2021–23
- Yevhen Kopyl – Zagłębie Sosnowiec, Zagłębie Lubin – 2007–08, 2009–10
- Ihor Korniyets – Lech Poznań – 1991–93
- Dmytro Koshakov – Amica Wronki, Dyskobolia Grodzisk Wielkopolski – 1999–2003
- Volodymyr Kostevych – Lech Poznań – 2016–20
- Volodymyr Koval – Bruk-Bet Termalica Nieciecza – 2015–17
- Vasyl Kravets – Lech Poznań – 2020–21
- Serhiy Krykun – Górnik Łęczna, Piast Gliwice, Stal Mielec – 2021–22, 2023–25 (Note: Acquired Polish citizenship on 24 March 2023)
- Pavlo Ksyonz – Sandecja Nowy Sącz – 2017–18
- Ihor Lysak – ŁKS Łódź – 1996–97
- Kostyantyn Makhnovskyi – ŁKS Łódź, Legia Warsaw – 2007–08, 2010–11
- Yehor Matsenko – Śląsk Wrocław – 2022–25
- Myroslav Mazur – Jagiellonia Białystok – 2020–21
- Ihor Mihalevskyi – GKS Bełchatów – 2008–09
- Andriy Mikhalchuk – Widzew Łódź – 1992–2002 (Note: Acquired Polish citizenship in 2005)
- Mykola Musolitin – Lechia Gdańsk – 2020–22
- Serhiy Myakushko – Podbeskidzie Bielsko-Biała – 2020–21
- Borys Oliynyk – Stal Stalowa Wola, GKS Bełchatów – 1994–96
- Kostyantyn Panin – Amica Wronki – 1999–2000
- Kyrylo Petrov – Korona Kielce – 2013–15, 2022–24
- Artem Polyarus – Bruk-Bet Termalica Nieciecza – 2021–22
- **Artem Putivtsev** – **Bruk-Bet Termalica Nieciecza** – 2015–18, 2021–22, 2025– (Note: Acquired Polish citizenship in 15 October 2021)
- Serhiy Pylypchuk – Korona Kielce – 2013–17
- Yevhen Radionov – ŁKS Łódź – 2019–20
- Serhiy Ralyuchenko – Stal Mielec – 1991–92
- **Taras Romanczuk** – **Jagiellonia Białystok** – 2014– (Note: Since 24th round of 2017–18 season player considered as Polish citizen)
- Artur Rudko – Lech Poznań – 2022–23
- **Nazariy Rusyn** – **Arka Gdynia** – 2025–
- **Bohdan Sarnavskyi** – **Lechia Gdańsk** – 2024–
- Artem Shabanov – Legia Warsaw – 2020–21
- Yehor Sharabura – Śląsk Wrocław – 2024–25
- Yuriy Shatalov – Amica Wronki – 1995–98
- Oleksandr Shemetyev – Sokół Tychy – 1995–96
- Serhiy Sherabokov – Polonia Warsaw – 1996–97
- Oleksandr Shevelyukhin – Górnik Zabrze – 2011–16, 2017–18
- Serhiy Shevtsov – Dyskobolia Grodzisk Wielkopolski – 2000–01
- Oleksii Shliakotin – Korona Kielce – 2012–14
- Valeriy Sokolenko – Górnik Łęczna, Polonia Bytom – 2005–09
- Denys Sokolovskyi – Pogoń Szczecin – 2001–02
- Oleksandr Spivak – Stal Mielec – 1993–94
- Viktor Suslo – Igloopol Dębica – 1991–92
- Viktor Sydorenko – Hutnik Kraków, Wisła Kraków – 1993–95, 1996–98
- Mykola Sych – Warta Poznań – 1993–94
- Ihor Syvukha – Stal Stalowa Wola – 1993–94
- Volodymyr Tanchyk – Ruch Chorzów, Górnik Łęczna – 2014–15
- Oleksiy Tereshchenko – Stal Mielec, Olimpia Poznań, Dyskobolia Grodzisk Wielkopolski – 1991–95, 1997–98 (Note: Acquired Polish citizenship in 2003)
- **Anton Tsarenko** – **Lechia Gdańsk** – 2024–
- Ihor Tyshchenko – Śląsk Wrocław – 2015–16
- **Bohdan Vyunnyk** – **Lechia Gdańsk** – 2024–
- **Roman Yakuba** – Puszcza Niepołomice, **Zagłębie Lubin** – 2023–
- Vasyl Yatsyshyn – Igloopol Dębica – 1990–91
- Volodymyr Yurchenko – Stal Stalowa Wola – 1991–92
- Serhiy Zaytsev – Pogoń Szczecin – 1998–99
- **Ivan Zhelizko** – **Lechia Gdańsk** – 2024–
- Roman Zub – Legia Warsaw – 1992–93

== North, Central America and Caribbean (CONCACAF) ==
=== Barbados ===
- Thierry Gale – Piast Gliwice – 2024–25

=== Canada ===
- Milan Borjan – Korona Kielce – 2016–17
- Marcus Godinho – Korona Kielce – 2022–25
- Charlie Trafford – Korona Kielce – 2015–16
- Kris Twardek – Jagiellonia Białystok – 2020–21
- Steven Vitória – Lechia Gdańsk – 2016–19
- **Dominick Zator** – Korona Kielce, **Arka Gdynia** – 2022–

=== Costa Rica ===
- Felicio Brown Forbes – Korona Kielce, Raków Częstochowa, Wisła Kraków – 2018–22
- Júnior Díaz – Wisła Kraków – 2007–12

=== Curaçao ===
- Jurich Carolina – Miedź Legnica – 2022–23
- Anthony van den Hurk – Górnik Zabrze – 2022–23
- Gino van Kessel – Lechia Gdańsk – 2016–17

=== Dominican Republic ===
- Carlos Julio Martínez – Miedź Legnica – 2022–23

=== Guadeloupe ===
- David Fleurival – Zawisza Bydgoszcz – 2014–15
- Thomas Phibel – Widzew Łódź – 2012–14

=== Guatemala ===
- Luis Swisher – Polonia Warsaw – 2005–06

=== Haiti ===
- Wilde-Donald Guerrier – Wisła Kraków – 2013–16
- Kevin Lafrance – Widzew Łódź – 2013–14
- Emmanuel Sarki – Wisła Kraków – 2012–15

=== Honduras ===
- Osman Chávez – Wisła Kraków – 2010–14
- Carlo Costly – GKS Bełchatów – 2006–10
- **Luis Palma** – **Lech Poznań** – 2025–
- Romell Quioto – Wisła Kraków – 2012–13

=== Martinique ===
- Bédi Buval – Lechia Gdańsk – 2010–11
- Steeven Langil – Legia Warsaw – 2016–17

=== Mexico ===
- Enrique Esqueda – Arka Gdynia – 2017–18
- Santiago Naveda – Miedź Legnica – 2022–23
- Danny Trejo – Korona Kielce – 2023–25

=== Panama ===
- Luis Henríquez – Lech Poznań – 2007–15

=== Puerto Rico ===
- Shawn Barry – Korona Kielce – 2017–18

=== United States ===
- **Kellyn Acosta** – **Pogoń Szczecin** – 2025–
- Mike Apple – Petro Płock – 1999–2000
- Justin Evans – Petro Płock – 1999–2000
- **Leon Flach** – **Jagiellonia Białystok** – 2024–
- Neil Hlavaty – Jagiellonia Białystok – 2009–10
- Ian Hoffmann – Lech Poznań – 2024–25
- Brian Iloski – Legia Warsaw – 2017–18
- **Aziel Jackson** – **Jagiellonia Białystok** – 2025–
- Aron Jóhannsson – Lech Poznań – 2020–21
- Kenny Saief – Lechia Gdańsk – 2019–21
- Jeremiah White – GKS Bełchatów – 2010–11
- **Kahveh Zahiroleslam** – **Cracovia** – 2025–

== Oceania (OFC) ==
=== New Zealand ===
- Aaran Lines – Ruch Chorzów – 2002–03
- **Alex Paulsen** – **Lechia Gdańsk** – 2025–
- Themistoklis Tzimopoulos – Korona Kielce – 2019–20

== South America (CONMEBOL) ==
=== Argentina ===
- Juan Bauzá – Górnik Zabrze – 2019–20
- Ismael Blanco – Legia Warsaw – 2011–12
- Ariel Cabral – Legia Warsaw – 2010–11
- Jerónimo Cacciabue – Miedź Legnica – 2022–23
- Mauro Cantoro – Wisła Kraków, Odra Wodzisław Śląski – 2001–10 (Note: Since 27th round of 2007–08 season player considered as Polish citizen)
- Thiago Ceijas – ŁKS Łódź – 2023–24
- Guillermo Coppola – GKS Katowice – 1990–91
- Cristian Omar Díaz – Śląsk Wrocław – 2010–13
- Matías Favano – Lech Poznań, Polonia Warsaw – 2004–06
- Jorge García – Wisła Kraków – 1991–92
- Manuel Pablo García – Legia Warsaw – 2003–04
- Andrés Lioi – Korona Kielce – 2019–20
- Fabio Marozzi – Śląsk Wrocław – 1990–91
- **Lucas Masoero** – **Bruk-Bet Termalica Nieciecza** – 2025–
- Gervasio Núñez – Wisła Kraków – 2011–12
- Paulo Pérez – Widzew Łódź – 2002–03
- Andrés Ríos – Wisła Kraków – 2010–11
- Germán Darío Rodríguez – Lech Poznań – 1990–91
- Marcelo Süller – Igloopol Dębica – 1991–92

=== Brazil ===
- Adriano – Pogoń Szczecin – 2004–05
- Hugo Alcântara – Legia Warsaw – 2006–07
- Alexandre – Śląsk Wrocław – 2011–12
- Igor Alves – Widzew Łódź – 2011–12
- Amaral – Pogoń Szczecin – 2005–07
- **Adriano Amorim** – **Raków Częstochowa** – 2024–
- Edi Andradina – Pogoń Szczecin, Korona Kielce – 2004–08, 2009–11, 2012–14
- Anderson – Lech Poznań, Pogoń Szczecin, Arka Gdynia – 2005–07, 2008–09
- Anderson – Pogoń Szczecin, Zagłębie Lubin – 2005–07
- Andreson – ŁKS Łódź – 2007–08
- Samuel Araújo – Zawisza Bydgoszcz – 2014–15
- Raphael Augusto – Legia Warsaw – 2013–14
- **Gabriel Barbosa** – **Górnik Zabrze** – 2025–
- André Barreto – Wisła Kraków – 2005–06
- Batata – Pogoń Szczecin – 2005–06
- Sérgio Batata – ŁKS Łódź, GKS Katowice, Pogoń Szczecin, KSZO Ostrowiec Świętokrzyski, Widzew Łódź, Dyskobolia Grodzisk Wielkopolski – 1996–97, 1998–2003, 2004–08 (Note: Since 14th round of 2006–07 season player considered as Polish citizen)
- Beto – Wisła Kraków – 2008–09
- **Léo Borges** – **Pogoń Szczecin** – 2022–
- Brasília – Wisła Kraków, Pogoń Szczecin, Zagłębie Lubin, Odra Wodzisław Śląski – 1999–2001, 2002–04, 2009–10
- Bruno – Widzew Łódź – 2003–04
- Aléx Bruno – Widzew Łódź – 2012–14
- Daniel Bueno – Odra Wodzisław Śląski – 2009–10
- Campos – Pogoń Szczecin – 2006–07
- Fabinho Capixaba – Pogoń Szczecin – 2005–06
- Rodrigo Carbone – ŁKS Łódź – 1997–98
- Diego Carioca – Jagiellonia Białystok – 2021–22
- **Jean Carlos** – Wisła Kraków, Pogoń Szczecin, **Raków Częstochowa** – 2019–
- Luiz Carlos – Widzew Łódź – 2003–04
- Luís Carlos – Zawisza Bydgoszcz, Korona Kielce, Zagłębie Lubin – 2013–16
- Emerson Carvalho – Widzew Łódź – 2012–13
- Willian César – Pogoń Szczecin – 2005–07
- Thiago Cionek – Jagiellonia Białystok – 2008–13 (Note: Since 10th round of 2011–12 season player considered as Polish citizen)
- Cléber – Wisła Kraków – 2006–11
- Cleisson – Pogoń Szczecin – 2005–06
- Conrado – Lechia Gdańsk – 2019–23, 2024–25
- Fábio Costa – Pogoń Szczecin – 2005–06
- Bruno Coutinho – Jagiellonia Białystok, Polonia Warsaw – 2007–12
- Rafael Crivellaro – Wisła Kraków – 2015–16
- Daniel Cruz – Pogoń Szczecin – 2005–07
- Danilo – Pogoń Szczecin – 2006–07
- Darci – Widzew Łódź – 2002–03
- Deci – Wisła Kraków – 1999–2000
- Deleu – Lechia Gdańsk, Cracovia – 2010–18 (Note: Since 26th round of 2016–17 season player considered as Polish citizen)
- **Thiago Dombroski** – **Bruk-Bet Termalica Nieciecza** – 2025– (Note: Acquired Polish citizenship in June 2024)
- Dirceu – Korona Kielce – 2010–11
- Douglas – Widzew Łódź – 2007–08
- Edno – Wisła Kraków – 2003–04
- Édson – Legia Warsaw, Korona Kielce – 2005–10
- Élton – Pogoń Szczecin – 2005–07
- Élton – Legia Warsaw – 2006–07
- Éverton – Jagiellonia Białystok – 2007–09
- Felipe – Pogoń Szczecin – 2006–07
- Fernando – ŁKS Łódź – 1997–99 (Note: Acquired Polish citizenship in 2008)
- Vinícius Ferreira – Cracovia – 2018–19
- Filipe – Górnik Zabrze, Zagłębie Lubin – 2003–07 (Note: Acquired Polish citizenship on 18 December 2015)
- Gérson – Lechia Gdańsk, Górnik Łęczna – 2014–18, 2021–22
- Gilcimar – Zagłębie Lubin – 2005–06
- Giuliano – Legia Warsaw, Widzew Łódź, Pogoń Szczecin – 2000–01, 2002–03, 2004–05
- Junior Godoi – Legia Warsaw – 2006–07
- Gu – Pogoń Szczecin – 2006–07
- Guilherme – Legia Warsaw – 2013–18
- Guilherme – Bruk-Bet Termalica Nieciecza, Jagiellonia Białystok – 2016–20
- Roger Guerreiro – Legia Warsaw – 2005–10 (Note: Since 27th round of 2007–08 season player considered as Polish citizen)
- Gustavo – Widzew Łódź – 2007–08
- Guti – Jagiellonia Białystok – 2015–18
- Matheus Hansen – Pogoń Szczecin – 2005–06
- Hebert – Piast Gliwice, Wisła Kraków – 2013–18, 2019–20
- Pedro Henrique – Radomiak Radom – 2023–24
- Hermes – Widzew Łódź, Korona Kielce, Jagiellonia Białystok, Zawisza Bydgoszcz – 2002–03, 2005–12, 2013–14 (Note: Since 30th round of 2013–14 season player considered as Polish citizen)
- Hernâni – Górnik Zabrze, Korona Kielce, Pogoń Szczecin – 2003–08, 2009–15 (Note: Since 16th round of 2010–11 season player considered as Polish citizen)
- Julcimar – ŁKS Łódź, Dyskobolia Grodzisk Wielkopolski, RKS Radomsko, Pogoń Szczecin – 1998–2000, 2001–02, 2004–07
- Juliano – Widzew Łódź – 2003–04
- Júnior – Pogoń Szczecin – 2006–07
- Kleyr – ŁKS Łódź – 2007–08
- Kléber – Górnik Zabrze – 2005–06
- Leândro – Korona Kielce, Górnik Łęczna, Stal Mielec – 2014–17, 2021–24 (Note: Acquired Polish citizenship on 18 October 2020)
- Lélo – Widzew Łódź – 2003–04
- Léo – GKS Katowice – 2002–04
- Lilo – Pogoń Szczecin, Ruch Chorzów – 2005–08
- Élton Lira – Zagłębie Lubin – 2011–13
- Luizão – Pogoń Szczecin – 2024–25
- Luizão – Radomiak Radom – 2021–25
- **Luquinhas** – Legia Warsaw, **Radomiak Radom** – 2019–22, 2024–
- Marcelo – Pogoń Szczecin – 2006–07
- Marcelo – Wisła Kraków – 2008–10
- Tiago Martins – Pogoń Szczecin – 2006–07
- Vinícius Matheus – Jagiellonia Białystok – 2023–24
- **Maurides** – **Radomiak Radom** – 2021–23, 2025–
- Maurício – Legia Warsaw – 2017–18
- Mauro – ŁKS Łódź, Pogoń Szczecin – 1997–98, 2004–05
- Maycon – Jagiellonia Białystok – 2009–10, 2011–12
- Diego Máximo – Pogoń Szczecin – 2006–07
- Mello – Zagłębie Sosnowiec – 2018–19
- Bruno Mezenga – Legia Warsaw – 2010–11
- Mineiro – Pogoń Szczecin – 2005–07
- Henrique Miranda – Lechia Gdańsk – 2014–15
- Rodrigo Moledo – Odra Wodzisław Śląski – 2009–10
- Marcelo Moretto – Arka Gdynia – 2010–11
- Bruno Nazário – Lechia Gdańsk – 2014–16
- Neneca – Pogoń Szczecin – 2005–06
- André Nunes – Zagłębie Lubin – 2007–08
- Dudu Paraíba – Widzew Łódź, Śląsk Wrocław – 2010–12, 2013–16
- Paulinho – Górnik Łęczna – 2006–07
- Paulinho – ŁKS Łódź – 2007–08
- Jean Paulista – Wisła Kraków – 2005–08
- Júnior Paulista – Pogoń Szczecin – 2005–06
- Léo Paulista – Górnik Zabrze – 2008–09
- João Paulo – Górnik Zabrze, Cracovia – 2003–07
- **João Pedro Reginaldo** – **Radomiak Radom** – 2025–
- João Peglow – Radomiak Radom – 2023–25
- Pedro Perotti – Radomiak Radom – 2024–25
- Rafael Porcellis – Zawisza Bydgoszcz, Korona Kielce – 2014–15
- Rambo – Górnik Zabrze – 2003–06
- Carlos Renan – Zagłębie Lubin – 2005–06
- Rhuan – Radomiak Radom – 2021–22
- Ricardinho – Lechia Gdańsk, Wisła Płock – 2012–13, 2018–20
- Ricardo – ŁKS Łódź – 1996–97
- Rivaldinho – Cracovia – 2020–22
- Zé Roberto – Pogoń Szczecin – 2005–07
- Robson – Pogoń Szczecin – 2006–07
- Rodnei – Jagiellonia Białystok – 2007–08
- Rodrigo – ŁKS Łódź, Pogoń Szczecin – 1996–97, 2004–05
- Rodrigo – ŁKS Łódź – 1996–97
- Raphael Rossi – Radomiak Radom – 2021–25
- Sandro – Pogoń Szczecin – 2005–06
- Jô Santos – Radomiak Radom – 2021–22
- Marcelo Sarvas – Polonia Warsaw – 2009–11
- Saulo – ŁKS Łódź – 1997–98
- Leândro da Silva – Pogoń Szczecin – 2006–07
- Thiago – Cracovia, Puszcza Niepołomice – 2019–22, 2023–24
- Thiago Silveira – Pogoń Szczecin – 2006–07
- Thiaguinho – Śląsk Wrocław – 2001–02
- Márcio Tinga – Pogoń Szczecin – 2006–07
- Marco Túlio – Podbeskidzie Bielsko-Biała – 2020–21
- Ulisses – Górnik Zabrze – 2004–05
- Wágner – Zawisza Bydgoszcz – 2014–15
- Wágner – Pogoń Szczecin – 2005–06
- Valdir – Pogoń Szczecin – 2005–06
- Juca Viana – ŁKS Łódź – 2007–08
- Marcus Vinícius – GKS Bełchatów, Arka Gdynia – 2010–11, 2016–20 (Note: Since 27th round of 2016–17 season player considered as Polish citizen)
- Rodrigo Zeferino – Polonia Warsaw – 2005–06
- Guilherme Zimovski – Radomiak Radom – 2023–25 (Note: Acquired Polish citizenship in March 2023)

=== Chile ===
- César Cortés – Polonia Warsaw – 2009–10
- Ángelo Henríquez – Miedź Legnica – 2022–23
- Sebastián Rodríguez – Pogoń Szczecin – 2002–03

=== Colombia ===
- Gustavo Adolfo – Jagiellonia Białystok – 2009–10
- Manuel Arboleda – Zagłębie Lubin, Lech Poznań – 2005–14
- Frank Castañeda – Warta Poznań, Radomiak Radom – 2021–24
- **Jesús Díaz** – Raków Częstochowa, **Zagłębie Lubin** – 2024–
- **Juergen Elitim** – **Legia Warsaw** – 2023–
- **Camilo Mena** – Jagiellonia Białystok, **Lechia Gdańsk** – 2022–23, 2024–
- Sergio Reina – Zagłębie Lubin – 2009–13
- Jean Franco Sarmiento – Radomiak Radom – 2022–23, 2024–25
- Ever Valencia – Wisła Kraków – 2016–17

=== Ecuador ===
- Joel Valencia – Piast Gliwice, Legia Warsaw – 2017–21
- John Yeboah – Śląsk Wrocław, Raków Częstochowa – 2022–24

=== Paraguay ===
- Jorge Salinas – Legia Warsaw – 2012–13

=== Peru ===
- Josimar Atoche – Górnik Łęczna – 2016–17
- Anderson Cueto – Lech Poznań – 2007–10
- Michael Guevara – Jagiellonia Białystok – 2008–09
- Jhoel Herrera – GKS Bełchatów – 2007–09
- Henry Quinteros – Lech Poznań – 2006–08
- Hernán Rengifo – Lech Poznań – 2007–10
- Willy Rivas – Górnik Zabrze – 2008–09
- Junior Ross – Arka Gdynia – 2010–11
- Alexander Sánchez – GKS Bełchatów – 2007–09

=== Uruguay ===
- Pablo Álvarez – Wisła Kraków – 2009–10
- Jean Barrientos – Wisła Kraków – 2014–15
- Guillermo Cotugno – Śląsk Wrocław – 2019–21
- Claudio Milar – ŁKS Łódź, Pogoń Szczecin – 1999–2000, 2004–06
- César Silvera – Pogoń Szczecin – 2004–05
- Nico Varela – Wisła Płock – 2017–19
- Rodrigo Zalazar – Korona Kielce – 2019–20

=== Venezuela ===
- Jhon Chancellor – Zagłębie Lubin – 2021–22
- Raúl González – GKS Bełchatów – 2012–13
- Mario Rondón – Radomiak Radom – 2021–22

== Notes ==
1. Born in Albania
2. Born in Angola
3. Born in Argentina
4. Born in Australia
5. Born in Austria
6. Born in Belgium
7. Born in Bosnia and Herzegovina (then part of Yugoslavia)
8. Born in Brazil
9. Born in West Germany (now part of Germany)
10. Born in Cameroon
11. Born in Chile
12. Born in Ivory Coast
13. Born in Croatia
14. Born in Croatia (then part of Yugoslavia)
15. Born in Curaçao (constituent country of the Kingdom of the Netherlands [then part of the Netherlands Antilles])
16. Born in Cyprus
17. Born in East Germany (now part of Germany)
18. Born in England
19. Born in Spain
20. Born in France
21. Born in Gambia
22. Born in Guinea-Bissau
23. Born in Georgia (then part of the Soviet Union)
24. Born in Germany
25. Born in Ghana
26. Born in Greece
27. Born in Iraq
28. Born in Israel
29. Born in Italy
30. Born in Kazakhstan (then part of the Soviet Union)
31. Born in Kosovo (then part of Yugoslavia)
32. Born in Liberia
33. Born in Luxembourg
34. Born in North Macedonia (then part of Yugoslavia)
35. Born in Monaco
36. Born in the Netherlands
37. Born in Nigeria
38. Born in Poland
39. Born in Portugal
40. Born in South Africa
41. Born in Russia
42. Born in Russia (then part of the Soviet Union)
43. Born in Serbia and Montenegro
44. Born in Senegal
45. Born in Slovenia
46. Born in Serbia
47. Born in Serbia (then part of Yugoslavia)
48. Born in Switzerland
49. Born in Sweden
50. Born in Tajikistan (then part of the Soviet Union)
51. Born in Ukraine (then part of the Soviet Union)
52. Born in the United States
53. Born in the Democratic Republic of Congo (then Zaïre)
54. Capped for the Albania national under-17 football team
55. Capped for the Albania national under-19 football team
56. Capped for the Albania national under-21 football team
57. Capped for the Austria national under-16 football team
58. Capped for the Belgium national under-16 football team
59. Capped for the Belgium national under-19 football team
60. Capped for the Belgium national under-20 football team
61. Capped for the Bosnia and Herzegovina national under-17 football team
62. Capped for the Bosnia and Herzegovina national under-21 football team
63. Capped for the Catalonia national football team
64. Capped for the Croatia national under-18 football team
65. Capped for the Croatia national under-21 football team
66. Capped for the Czech Republic national under-17 football team
67. Capped for the Czech Republic national under-18 football team
68. Capped for the Czech Republic national under-19 football team
69. Capped for the England national under-15 football team
70. Capped for the England national under-16 football team
71. Capped for the Basque Country national football team
72. Capped for the France national under-16 football team
73. Capped for the France national under-18 football team
74. Capped for the France national under-19 football team
75. Capped for the France national under-20 football team
76. Capped for the France national under-21 football team
77. Capped for the Galicia national football team
78. Capped for the Germany national under-16 football team
79. Capped for the Germany national under-17 football team
80. Capped for the Germany national under-18 football team
81. Capped for the Germany national under-19 football team
82. Capped for the Germany national under-20 football team
83. Capped for the Iceland national under-21 football team
84. Capped for the Israel national football team
85. Capped for the Israel national under-16 football team
86. Capped for the Israel national under-18 football team
87. Capped for the Israel national under-19 football team
88. Capped for the Israel national under-21 football team
89. Capped for the Italy national under-15 football team
90. Capped for the Netherlands national under-15 football team
91. Capped for the Netherlands national under-16 football team
92. Capped for the Netherlands national under-17 football team
93. Capped for the Netherlands national under-19 football team
94. Capped for the Netherlands national under-20 football team
95. Capped for the Nigeria national under-17 football team
96. Capped for the Nigeria national under-20 football team
97. Capped for the Nigeria national under-23 football team
98. Capped for the Poland national under-19 football team
99. Capped for the Poland national under-20 football team
100. Capped for the Portugal national under-15 football team
101. Capped for the Portugal national under-16 football team
102. Capped for the Portugal national under-17 football team
103. Capped for the Portugal national under-18 football team
104. Capped for the Portugal national under-19 football team
105. Capped for the Portugal national under-20 football team
106. Capped for the Rhodes national football team
107. Capped for the Serbia and Montenegro national football team
108. Capped for the Serbia and Montenegro national under-17 football team
109. Capped for the Serbia and Montenegro national under-19 football team
110. Capped for the Slovenia national under-16 football team
111. Capped for the Slovenia national under-17 football team
112. Capped for the Slovenia national under-18 football team
113. Capped for the Slovenia national under-19 football team
114. Capped for the Slovenia national under-21 football team
115. Capped for the Slovenia national football B team
116. Capped for the Spain national under-17 football team
117. Capped for the Serbia national football team
118. Capped for the Serbia national under-15 football team
119. Capped for the Serbia national under-16 football team
120. Capped for the Serbia national under-17 football team
121. Capped for the Serbia national under-19 football team
122. Capped for the Serbia national under-21 football team
123. Capped for the Switzerland national under-17 football team
124. Capped for the Switzerland national under-18 football team
125. Capped for the Switzerland national under-19 football team
126. Capped for the Switzerland national under-20 football team
127. Capped for the Switzerland national under-21 football team
128. Capped for the Sweden men's national under-19 football team
129. Capped for the Sweden men's national under-21 football team
130. Capped for the Ukraine national football team
131. Capped for the Ukraine national under-17 football team
132. Capped for the Ukraine national under-18 football team
133. Capped for the Ukraine national under-19 football team
134. Capped for the Ukraine national under-20 football team
135. Capped for the Ukraine national under-21 football team
