= Jarosław Góra =

Polish footballer

Personal information
- Date of birth: 17 October 1964 (age 62)
- Place of birth: Lublin, Poland
- Height: 1.75 m (5 ft 9 in)
- Position: Midfielder

Senior career*
Years	Team	Apps	(Gls)
- Budowlani Lublin
1982–1988	Motor Lublin		
1984–1985	→ Broń Radom (loan)		
1988–1992	Zagłębie Lubin		
1992–1993	Motor Lublin		
1993–1997	Śląsk Wrocław		
1997–1998	Górnik Łęczna		
1999	Lublinianka		

International career
1992	Poland	1	(0)

Managerial career
- Budowlani Lublin
- Lublinianka
- Stal Poniatowa
- Unia Bełżyce
- Janowianka Janów Lubelski
- Start Krasnystaw
- LKS Wierzchowiska
- 2019–2020: Cisy Nałęczów
- * Club domestic league appearances and goals

Jarosław Góra (born 17 October 1964) is a Polish former professional footballer who played as a midfielder.

He appeared once for the Poland national team in 1992.

== Honours ==
Zagłębie Lubin

- Ekstraklasa: 1990–91
