= Marian Putyra =

Polish football manager

Personal information
- Date of birth: 19 September 1957 (age 69)
- Place of birth: Lubin, Poland

Managerial career
- Years: Team
- 1990–1992: Zagłębie Lubin
- 1993–1995: Górnik Polkowice
- 1995–1998: Miedź Legnica
- 2001: Śląsk Wrocław
- 2001–2002: Śląsk Wrocław (assistant)
- 2002–2003: Śląsk Wrocław
- 2003–2004: Polar Wrocław
- 2004: Polonia Słubice

Marian Putyra (born 19 September 1957) is a Polish former professional football manager.

== Honours ==
Zagłębie Lubin

- Ekstraklasa: 1990–91
