= Tadeusz Pawłowski =

Polish footballer (born 1953)

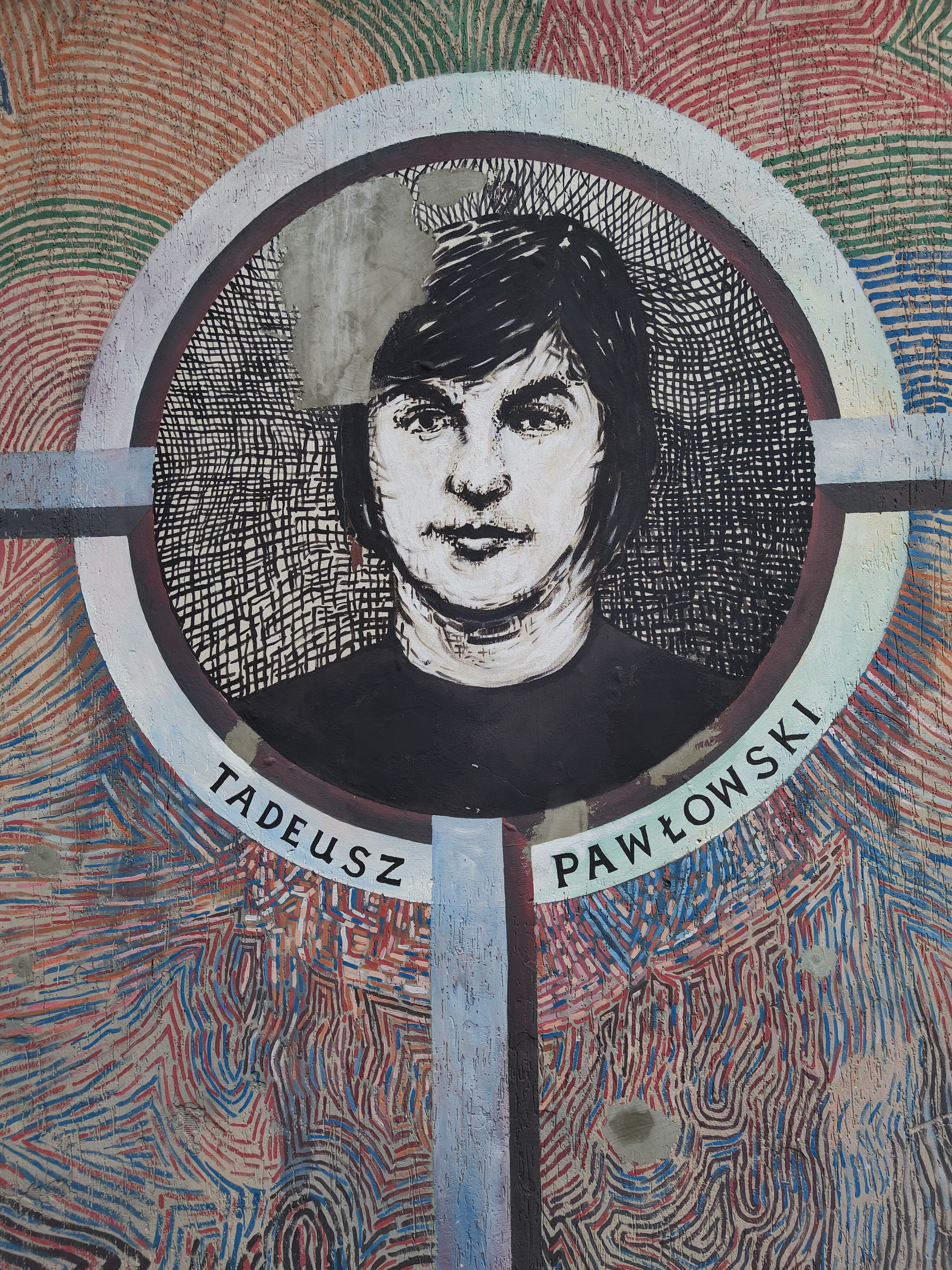

Personal information
- Full name: Tadeusz Jan Pawłowski
- Date of birth: 14 October 1953 (age 73)
- Place of birth: Wrocław, Poland
- Height: 1.76 m (5 ft 9 in)
- Positions: Midfielder; forward

Youth career
- 1964–1971: Pafawag Wrocław

Senior career*
| Years | Team | Apps | (Gls) |
| 1971–1974 | Zagłębie Wałbrzych | 71 | (15) |
| 1974–1982 | Śląsk Wrocław | 217 | (63) |
| 1982–1984 | Admira Wacker Mödling | 20 | (4) |
| 1984–1987 | SC Bregenz | | |
| Total | | 308 | (21) |

International career
| 1970–1972 | Poland U19 | 20 | (8) |
| 1972–1974 | Poland U21 | 21 | (7) |
| 1976–1979 | Poland | 5 | (0) |

Managerial career
- SC Bregenz
- 1992–1993: Śląsk Wrocław
- 1993–1995: SV St. Margarethen
- 1995–1999: Rheindorf Altach
- 2003: Polar Wrocław
- 2005: Bystrzyca Kąty Wrocławskie
- 2005: Polar Wrocław
- 2005–2008: FC Blau-Weiß Feldkirch
- 2008–2014: AKA Vorarlberg (youth)
- 2014–2015: Śląsk Wrocław
- 2015–2016: Wisła Kraków
- 2018: Śląsk Wrocław
Medal record
Men's football
Representing Poland
UEFA European Under-18 Championship
| Third place | 1972 Spain |
- * Club domestic league appearances and goals

Tadeusz Pawłowski (born 14 October 1953) is a Polish professional football manager and former player who last managed Śląsk Wrocław. Pawłowski has spent the majority of his career playing and managing for football teams in the Wrocław area, spending the majority of his career playing for Śląsk Wrocław. Pawłowski received five caps for Poland from 1976 to 1979.

== Early years ==
Pawłowski grew up going to many Śląsk Wrocław games with his father, and was a fan of the club. Despite being a fan of Śląsk, the area of Wrocław in which he grew up was located between two stadiums, the stadium for Śląsk Wrocław and the stadium for Pafawag Wrocław. As a result, Pafawag Wrocław started his youth career training with Pafawag Wrocław, a team many of his friends growing up also decided to train with.

== Senior career ==
=== Poland ===
Pawłowski joined Zagłębie Wałbrzych in 1971, and played with the club during their most successful years. In Pawłowski's first season with the club, Zagłębie were playing in Europe, due to a 3rd-place finish in the Ekstraklasa the previous season. The team beat FK Teplice over two legs, before losing to UTA Arad and being knocked out of the cup. In 1974 Zagłębie Wałbrzych suffered relegation from the Ekstraklasa, and Pawłowski left after at the end of the season.

In 1974 Pawłowski joined his boyhood club, Śląsk Wrocław. His time with Śląsk was almost instantly successful, with the team winning the Puchar Polski in 1976. As a result, this meant that Śląsk qualified for the 1976-77 UEFA Cup Winners' Cup, with which Śląsk reached the quarter-finals before losing to Napoli over two legs. That season proved to be even better for Pawłowski and Śląsk, as the team won their first ever Ekstraklasa title at the end of the season. The following season was again successful, with the team finishing 2nd in the league, and playing in Europe once again, however they lost in the first round of the European Cup. The season after Śląsk did not perform as well in the league, however the team reached the Third Round of the UEFA Cup before losing to Borussia Mönchengladbach. Śląsk Wrocław once again finished runners-up in the Ekstraklasa for the 1981-82 season. After that season Pawłowski left Śląsk Wrocław, enjoying his most successful times of his playing career at the club, as well as playing for Śląsk while they enjoyed their most successful periods of European football until the 2010s.

=== Austria ===
Pawłowski moved to Austria in 1982 to join Admira Wacker Mödling, leaving in 1984 to join SC Bregenz until 1987. His 5-year playing career in Austria eventually let to Pawłowski staying in the country after his playing career as a coach and manager for over 20 years.

== Managerial career ==
Pawłowski started his managerial career with SC Bregenz, the last team he played with professionally. He joined Śląsk Wrocław for a brief spell in 1992-93, before returning to Austria to manage SV St. Margarethen and Rheindorf Altach. In 2003 Pawłowski returned to the city of his birth to manage lower league sides Polar Wrocław (two spells in 2003 and 2005) and Bystrzyca Kąty Wrocławskie. In 2005 Pawłowski once again went back to Austria, this time to manage FC Blau-Weiß Feldkirch. After three years in Feldkirch, Pawłowski joined Austrian youth football team AKA Vorarlberg, where he managed the team for 6 years. 2014 saw Pawłowski returning to Poland when he signed to be manager of Śląsk Wrocław for the second time. Under his leadership Śląsk finished in 4th, and qualified for the UEFA Europa League qualifying rounds. Despite his initial success with Śląsk, Pawłowski joined Wisła Kraków at the end of 2015. His time at Wisła was not very successful, and he was without a job a few months later. In 2018 Pawłowski once again joined Śląsk Wrocław for his third spell at the club. However with the squad struggling and performances seeing Śląsk just above the relegation zone, Pawłowski was dismissed as the first team coach in December of the same year.

== Personal life ==
Pawłowski is married to Anna, and they have 2 sons together. In 2011 his oldest son, Paweł, died due to cancer after a tumor was discovered in his eyes. His other son, Piotr, was discovered to have a brain aneurysm in 2013. As a result, Piotr was in a medically induced coma for 10 months, and has been disabled since.

== Honours ==
=== Player ===
Śląsk Wrocław

- Ekstraklasa: 1976–77, runner-up: 1977–78, 1981–82
- Polish Cup: 1975–76

Poland U18

- UEFA European Under-18 Championship third place: 1972

=== Manager ===
Individual

- Polish Coach of the Year: 2014
