= 1977–78 Ekstraklasa =

52nd season of top-tier football league in Poland

I liga
- Season: 1977–78
- Dates: 20 July 1977 – 2 May 1978
- Champions: Wisła Kraków; 6th league title 5th Polish title (Note: In 1951, the Polish Football Association decided to give the Champion of Poland title to the winner of the Polish Cup, in order to increase the importance of the re-activated cup competition. Ruch Chorzów was 6th in the league, but won the cup, beating 2-0 Wisła Kraków in the final game. However, in the league, Wisła Kraków was first, Górnik Radlin second and Legia Warsaw third.)
- Relegated: Zawisza Bydgoszcz; Górnik Zabrze
- European Cup: Wisła Kraków
- Cup Winners' Cup: Zagłębie Sosnowiec
- UEFA Cup: Śląsk Wrocław; Lech Poznań
- Matches: 240
- Goals: 510 (2.13 per match)
- Top goalscorer: Kazimierz Kmiecik (15 goals)
- Biggest home win: Górnik 5–0 Pogoń
- Biggest away win: Pogoń 0–4 Zagłębie
- Highest scoring: Legia 6–3 Śląsk
- Highest attendance: 45,000
- Total attendance: 3,201,360
- Average attendance: 13,339 ▼7.1%

The 1977–78 I liga was the 52nd season of the Polish Football Championship and the 44th season of the I liga, the top Polish professional league for association football clubs, since its establishment in 1927. The league was operated by the Polish Football Association (PZPN).

The champions were Wisła Kraków, who won their 5th Polish title and 6th Polish league title (in the 1951 season Wisła Kraków finished in the first position and became the league champion, but in that season, the I liga was not a competition for the title of the Polish Champion. Before the season Polish Football Association decided that Champion of Poland title will be awarded to the winner of the Polish Cup, which was later Ruch Chorzów).

== Competition modus ==
The season started on 20 July 1977 and concluded on 2 May 1978 (autumn-spring league). The season was played as a round-robin tournament. The team at the top of the standings won the league title. A total of 16 teams participated, 14 of which competed in the league during the 1976–77 season, while the remaining two were promoted from the 1976–77 II liga. Each team played a total of 30 matches, half at home and half away, two games against each other team. Teams received two points for a win and one point for a draw.

== League table ==
Pos	Team	Pld	W	D	L	GF	GA	GD	Pts	Qualification or relegation
1	Wisła Kraków (C)	30	13	13	4	35	23	+12	39	Qualification to European Cup first round
2	Śląsk Wrocław	30	16	6	8	36	30	+6	38	Qualification to UEFA Cup first round
3	Lech Poznań	30	12	13	5	29	25	+4	37	Qualification to UEFA Cup first round
4	ŁKS Łódź	30	10	11	9	29	29	0	31	
5	Legia Warsaw	30	12	7	11	44	34	+10	31	
6	Odra Opole	30	13	4	13	35	31	+4	30	
7	Arka Gdynia	30	11	8	11	30	35	−5	30	
8	Stal Mielec	30	11	7	12	31	29	+2	29	
9	Zagłębie Sosnowiec	30	10	8	12	33	33	0	28	Qualification to Cup Winners' Cup first round
10	Widzew Łódź	30	9	10	11	34	40	−6	28	
11	Pogoń Szczecin	30	11	6	13	36	42	−6	28	
12	Szombierki Bytom	30	8	11	11	25	35	−10	27	
13	Polonia Bytom	30	7	13	10	26	26	0	27	
14	Ruch Chorzów	30	9	9	12	33	36	−3	27	
15	Zawisza Bydgoszcz (R)	30	11	5	14	29	32	−3	27	Relegated to II liga
16	Górnik Zabrze (R)	30	6	11	13	25	30	−5	23	Relegated to II liga

Source: 90minut.pl (in Polish)
(C) Champions; (R) Relegated

== Results ==
Home \ Away	ARK	GÓR	LPO	LEG	ŁKS	OOP	POG	BYT	RUC	STA	SZB	ŚLĄ	WID	WIS	ZSO	ZAW
Arka Gdynia		3–0	4–0	1–2	1–0	0–0	1–0	0–0	1–0	2–0	2–1	2–1	0–0	2–2	0–0	2–1
Górnik Zabrze	1–1		0–1	1–1	1–1	1–0	5–0	1–1	2–0	2–2	0–1	0–1	2–0	2–3	0–0	0–0
Lech Poznań	0–0	0–0		1–0	1–0	2–0	2–1	0–0	3–0	1–1	1–0	3–1	0–0	0–0	2–1	2–1
Legia Warsaw	1–0	1–0	0–0		1–1	0–1	0–0	1–2	3–0	0–1	2–1	6–3	1–1	2–0	3–2	0–1
ŁKS Łódź	2–0	2–0	3–0	3–1		1–0	0–0	2–0	2–1	1–0	0–0	0–1	2–1	0–0	1–2	1–0
Odra Opole	3–0	1–0	2–2	3–0	2–0		2–0	3–0	0–0	2–0	1–0	0–1	1–2	1–0	1–0	4–2
Pogoń Szczecin	3–1	4–1	2–3	1–4	0–0	2–0		1–0	2–1	3–0	3–0	2–0	4–3	0–1	0–4	3–1
Polonia Bytom	5–1	0–2	1–1	1–1	0–0	3–0	1–1		3–0	0–1	0–0	1–1	2–2	1–1	1–1	2–0
Ruch Chorzów	3–0	1–1	3–0	1–1	2–2	1–3	0–0	1–0		0–2	1–1	0–1	1–0	2–0	4–1	2–0
Stal Mielec	3–0	0–1	0–1	2–1	4–0	1–0	2–2	0–1	0–1		3–1	0–0	0–0	1–1	2–0	2–1
Szombierki Bytom	0–0	1–0	2–1	2–4	1–1	1–1	2–0	1–0	3–2	1–0		0–0	1–1	0–0	1–2	1–0
Śląsk Wrocław	1–0	1–0	1–0	1–0	1–1	4–2	2–0	1–0	2–1	3–1	1–1		3–1	3–1	0–3	1–0
Widzew Łódź	1–3	1–0	0–0	1–4	3–0	1–0	2–0	1–0	2–4	2–2	1–1	1–0		0–1	1–3	3–2
Wisła Kraków	3–1	0–0	1–1	2–1	1–1	2–1	2–0	0–0	1–1	1–0	4–0	2–0	1–1		1–0	2–1
Zagłębie Sosnowiec	1–2	2–1	0–0	0–3	3–1	2–1	1–2	2–0	0–0	0–1	2–1	0–0	1–2	0–0		0–0
Zawisza Bydgoszcz	1–0	1–1	1–1	1–0	2–1	3–0	1–0	0–1	0–0	1–0	2–0	2–1	1–0	1–2	2–0	

Source: 90minut.pl (in Polish)
Legend: Blue = home team win; Yellow = draw; Red = away team win.

== Top goalscorers ==
Rank	Player	Club	Goals
1	(Poland) Kazimierz Kmiecik	Wisła Kraków	15
2	(Poland) Andrzej Szarmach	Stal Mielec	13
3	(Poland) Zbigniew Boniek	Widzew Łódź	11
4	(Poland) Marek Kusto	Legia Warsaw	10
4	(Poland) Jan Benigier	Ruch Chorzów	10
6	(Poland) Kazimierz Deyna	Legia Warsaw	9
6	(Poland) Leszek Wolski	Pogoń Szczecin	9
6	(Poland) Stanisław Gzil	Górnik Zabrze	9
9	(Poland) Wojciech Tyc	Odra Opole	8
9	(Poland) Wlodzimierz Mazur	Zagłębie Sosnowiec	8
9	(Poland) Jerzy Dworczyk	Zagłębie Sosnowiec	8
9	(Poland) Tomasz Korynt	Arka Gdynia	8

== Attendances ==
#	Club	Average
1	Wisła Kraków	28,200
2	Zawisza Bydgoszcz	26,133
3	Lech Poznań	18,667
4	Śląsk Wrocław	17,867
5	Arka Gdynia	16,800
6	Legia Warszawa	15,600
7	Pogoń Szczecin	12,867
8	Widzew Łódź	11,400
9	ŁKS	11,067
10	Ruch Chorzów	9,800
11	Stal Mielec	9,733
12	Odra Opole	9,267
13	Górnik Zabrze	8,933
14	Polonia Bytom	7,400
15	Zagłębie Sosnowiec	6,600
16	Szombierki Bytom	3,087

== Bibliography ==
- Gowarzewski, Andrzej (2000). Encyklopedia Piłkarska Fuji. Liga Polska. O tytuł mistrza Polski 1920–2000 (in Polish). GiA, Katowice. ISBN 83-88232-02-9.
