= Marcin Narwojsz =

Polish footballer

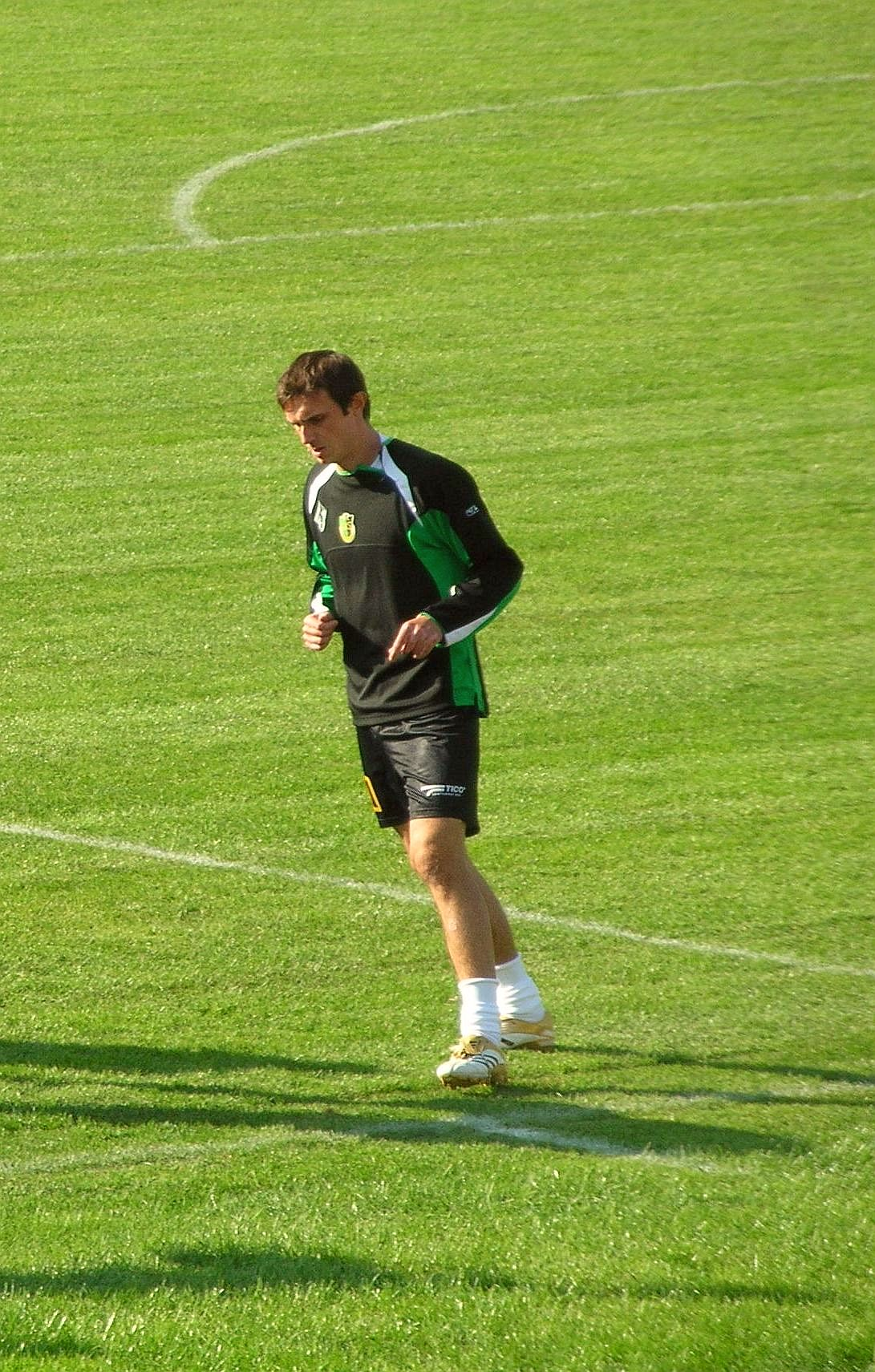

Personal information
- Full name: Marcin Narwojsz
- Date of birth: 25 May 1976 (age 50)
- Place of birth: Lubin, Poland
- Height: 1.84 m (6 ft 0 in)
- Position: Forward

Senior career*
Years	Team	Apps	(Gls)
1995–1999	Chrobry Głogów		
1999–2000	Polar Wrocław		
2001	Zagłębie Lubin	8	(1)
2001–2002	Polar Wrocław		
2002–2003	Ruch Chorzów	22	(2)
2003–2004	Górnik Polkowice	21	(1)
2004–2005	Chrobry Głogów		
2005	Ruch Wysokie Mazowieckie		
2006	Hetman Zamość		
2006–2008	GKS Jastrzębie	65	(14)
2009	Górnik Polkowice	10	(2)
2009–2020	Mieszko Ruszowice		

Managerial career
- 2009–2020: Mieszko Ruszowice (player-manager)
- * Club domestic league appearances and goals

Marcin Narwojsz (born 25 May 1976) is a Polish former professional footballer who played as a forward.

== Honours ==
Mieszko Ruszowice

- Klasa A, group Legnica I: 2013–14
