= Aleksander Papiewski =

Polish football manager (1939–2026)

Personal information
- Date of birth: 12 May 1939
- Place of birth: Zwoleń, Poland
- Date of death: 27 April 2026 (aged 86)

Managerial career
- Years: Team
- 1965–?: Śląsk Wrocław (youth)
- Strzelinianka Strzelin
- 1970–1971: Broń Radom
- Pafawag Wrocław
- Śląsk II Wrocław
- 1975–1976: Śląsk Wrocław (assistant)
- Śląsk II Wrocław
- 1978–1979: Śląsk Wrocław
- Śląsk II Wrocław
- 1983–1984: Śląsk Wrocław
- 1985–1986: Zagłębie Wałbrzych
- 1987: Radomiak Radom
- 1994–1995: Varta-Start Namysłów
- 1996–1997: Lechia Zielona Góra
- 1998: Śląsk Wrocław
- Orzeł Ząbkowice Śląskie
- 1999–2001: Polar Wrocław
- 2001: Bielawianka Bielawa
- 2001–2002: Pogoń Oleśnica
- 2003–2004: Hetman Zamość
- 2005–2007: Puma Pietrzykowice
- 2008: GKS Kobierzyce
- 2009–2010: Puma Pietrzykowice

Aleksander Papiewski (12 May 1939 – 27 April 2026) was a Polish professional football manager. He was best known for leading Śląsk Wrocław to a second-place finish in the 1977–78 Ekstraklasa.

== Career ==
Papiewski began coaching in the 1960s at Śląsk Wrocław, initially coaching youth teams, before moving onto Strzelinianka Strzelin.

Later he worked at Broń Radom and Pafawag Wrocław, before he returned to Śląsk in the 1970s, where he first led the reserves, and then became Władysław Żmuda's assistant manager.

During the 1977–78 top flight season, he took over the Wrocław team from Żmuda and won the Polish vice-championship with them. This was considered his greatest success, and coincided with Śląsk's golden era. Together with Żmuda, they are considered among the greatest managers in the club's history.

Later on he returned to Śląsk twice when the club was in the second division, in 1983 and 1998, replacing Stanisław Olearnik and Edward Żugaj respectively.

He also worked at many other professional clubs such as Radomiak Radom, Hetman Zamość, Zagłębie Wałbrzych and Polar Wrocław, where he earned the reputation of a motivational and fair manager.

Papiewski worked at Pogoń Oleśnica from December 2000 till April 2001 which followed after managing fellow Lower Silesian clubs Bielawianka Bielawa and Start Namysłów.

Towards the end of his career he coached continued coaching lower league clubs such as Puma Pietrzykowice and GKS Kobierzyce.

== Personal life and death ==
Papiewski was born in Zwoleń on 12 May 1939, and died on 27 April 2026, at the age of 86, after a one and a half year battle with a serious illness. His funeral was scheduled for 8 May, at the Grabiszyńska Street Municipal Cemetery in Wrocław.
