= Romuald Kujawa =

Polish footballer

Personal information
- Date of birth: 17 January 1962 (age 64)
- Place of birth: Sulechów, Poland
- Height: 1.84 m (6 ft 0 in)
- Position: Defender

Youth career
- Zagłębie Lubin
- Cargovia Kargowa

Senior career*
| Years | Team | Apps | (Gls) |
| 1978–1983 | Zagłębie Lubin | | |
| 1984–1985 | Śląsk Wrocław | 29 | (1) |
| 1985–1991 | Zagłębie Lubin | | |
| 1991–1993 | Châteauroux | 61 | (7) |
| 1993–1994 | Angoulême Charente | 30 | (0) |
| 1994–1996 | Śląsk Wrocław | | |
| 1996–1997 | Pogoń Szczecin | | |
| 1997–1998 | Śląsk Wrocław | | |
| 1998–2001 | Miedź Legnica | | |
| 2003–2007 | Odra Chobienia | | |

International career
| 1991 | Poland | 1 | (0) |
- * Club domestic league appearances and goals

Romuald Kujawa (born 17 January 1962) is a Polish former professional footballer who played as a defender.

He made one appearance for the Poland national team in 1991.

== Honours ==
Zagłębie Lubin

- Ekstraklasa: 1990–91
