= Grzegorz Kowalski (footballer, born 1963) =

Polish footballer

Personal information
- Date of birth: 12 January 1963 (age 63)
- Place of birth: Włocławek, Poland
- Height: 1.83 m (6 ft 0 in)
- Position: Midfielder

Team information
- Current team: Ślęza Wrocław (manager)

Youth career
- Lotnik Wrocław
- Śląsk Wrocław

Senior career*
Years	Team	Apps	(Gls)
1982	MKS Oława		
1982–1990	Ślęza Wrocław		
1990	Śląsk Wrocław	11	(1)
1990–1992	FSV Sömmerda		
1992–1993	Kelantan FA		
1993	Ślęza Wrocław		

Managerial career
- 1995–1997: Ślęza Wrocław
- 1997–1998: Górnik Wałbrzych
- 1998: Śląsk Wrocław
- 1999: Czarni Żagań
- 1999–2000: Polar Wrocław
- 2002–2003: Inkopax Wrocław
- 2003–2004: Śląsk Wrocław
- 2004–2005: Miedź Legnica
- 2005–2007: Lechia Zielona Góra II
- 2007–2008: Stilon Gorzów Wielkopolski
- 2009: Gawin/Ślęza Wrocław
- 2009: MKS Kluczbork
- 2009–2011: MKS Kluczbork
- 2012–2015: Ślęza Wrocław
- 2015: Śląsk Wrocław (assistant)
- 2015: Śląsk Wrocław (caretaker)
- 2015–: Ślęza Wrocław
- * Club domestic league appearances and goals

Grzegorz Kowalski (born 12 January 1963) is a Polish professional football manager and former player who played as a midfielder. He is currently in charge of III liga club Ślęza Wrocław.

== Honours ==
=== Manager ===
Ślęza Wrocław

- III liga Lower Silesia-Lubusz: 2013–14
- Polish Cup (Lower Silesia regionals): 2014–15, 2019–20, 2020–21
- Polish Cup (Wrocław regionals): 2014–15, 2019–20, 2020–21, 2021–22
