= 1981 UEFA European Under-18 Championship squads =

Player listings in youth football competition

Players in bold have later been capped at full international level.

== Group A ==
=== Belgium ===
Head coach:

=== West Germany ===
Head coach: Dietrich Weise

No.	Pos.	Player	Date of birth (age)	Caps	Goals	Club
	GK	Rüdiger Vollborn	12 February 1963 (aged 18)			(German Football Association) Blau-Weiß 90 Berlin
	GK	Rainer Wilk	22 November 1963 (aged 17)			(German Football Association) Arminia Bielefeld
	DF	Ingo Aulbach	5 August 1962 (aged 18)			(German Football Association) Viktoria Aschaffenburg
	DF	Ralf Falkenmeyer	11 February 1963 (aged 18)			(German Football Association) Eintracht Frankfurt
	DF	Ulf Quaisset	12 January 1962 (aged 19)			(German Football Association) SV Waldhof Mannheim
	DF	Anton Schmidkunz	3 January 1963 (aged 18)			(German Football Association) TSV 1860 München
	DF	Klaus Theiss	9 July 1963 (aged 17)			(German Football Association) TuS Ergenzingen
	MF	Thomas Brunner	10 August 1962 (aged 18)			(German Football Association) 1. FC Nürnberg
	MF	Joachim Goldstein	30 September 1962 (aged 18)			(German Football Association) FC Augsburg
	MF	Ralf Loose	5 January 1963 (aged 18)			(German Football Association) Borussia Dortmund
	MF	**Michael Zorc**	25 August 1962 (aged 18)			(German Football Association) Borussia Dortmund
	FW	Holger Anthes	9 August 1962 (aged 18)			(German Football Association) Eintracht Frankfurt
	FW	Leo Bunk	23 October 1962 (aged 18)			(German Football Association) TSV 1860 München
	FW	Thomas Herbst	3 October 1962 (aged 18)			(German Football Association) Hertha 03 Zehlendorf
	FW	Herbert Waask	8 September 1963 (aged 17)			(German Football Association) TSV 1860 München
	FW	Roland Wohlfahrt	11 January 1963 (aged 18)			(German Football Association) MSV Duisburg

=== Greece ===
Head coach:

=== Wales ===
Head coach:

== Group B ==
=== Czechoslovakia ===
Head coach:

=== Poland ===
Head coach: (Poland) Henryk Apostel

No.	Pos.	Player	Date of birth (age)	Caps	Goals	Club
	GK	**Józef Wandzik**	13 August 1963 (aged 17)			(Polish Football Association) Ruch Chorzów
	GK	Jerzy Zajda	19 May 1963 (aged 18)			(Polish Football Association) Zagłębie Wałbrzych
	DF	**Dariusz Kubicki**	6 June 1963 (aged 17)			(Polish Football Association) Lechia Zielona Góra
	DF	**Kazimierz Sokołowski**	11 February 1963 (aged 18)			(Polish Football Association) Pogoń Szczecin
	DF	**Modest Boguszewski**	8 January 1963 (aged 18)			(Polish Football Association) Motor Lublin
	DF	**Dariusz Wdowczyk**	25 September 1962 (aged 18)			(Polish Football Association) Gwardia Warszawa
	DF	Henryk Majer	29 January 1963 (aged 18)			(Polish Football Association) Odra Opole
	DF	Piotr Nazimek	31 May 1963 (aged 17)			(Polish Football Association) Cracovia Kraków
	MF	Robert Grzanka	6 September 1962 (aged 18)			(Polish Football Association) Motor Lublin
	MF	Robert Majewski	21 January 1963 (aged 18)			(Polish Football Association) Zagłębie Sosnowiec
	MF	Paweł Straszewski	21 November 1962 (aged 18)			(Polish Football Association) Zawisza Bydgoszcz
	MF	Jarosław Brela	18 October 1962 (aged 18)			(Polish Football Association) Górnik Zabrze
	MF	Janusz Stelmach	3 December 1962 (aged 18)			(Polish Football Association) Stal Mielec
	FW	**Dariusz Dziekanowski**	30 September 1962 (aged 18)			(Polish Football Association) Gwardia Warszawa
	FW	Andrzej Łatka	31 October 1962 (aged 18)			(Polish Football Association) Sandecja Nowy Sącz
	FW	Krzysztof Walczak	4 February 1963 (aged 18)			(Polish Football Association) Ruch Chorzów

=== Romania ===
Head coach:

=== Sweden ===
Head coach:

== Group C ==
=== Bulgaria ===
Head coach:

=== Denmark ===
Head coach:

=== France ===
Head coach:

=== Italy ===
Head coach:

== Group D ==
=== Austria ===
Head coach:

=== England ===
Head coach:

No.	Pos.	Player	Date of birth (age)	Caps	Goals	Club
	GK	Phil Kite	26 October 1962 (aged 18)			(The Football Association) Bristol Rovers
	DF	S Gibson	1 January 1963 (aged 18)			NA
	DF	Martyn Bennett	4 August 1961 (aged 19)			(The Football Association) West Bromwich Albion
	DF	Tony Finnigan	17 October 1962 (aged 18)			(The Football Association) Fulham
	DF	Trevor Slack	26 September 1962 (aged 18)			(The Football Association) Peterborough United
	DF	**Mike Phelan**	24 September 1962 (aged 18)			(The Football Association) Mike Phelan
	MF	Paul Allen	28 August 1962 (aged 18)			(The Football Association) West Ham United
	MF	Terry Connor	9 November 1962 (aged 18)			(The Football Association) Leeds United
	MF	**Paul Walsh**	1 October 1962 (aged 18)			(The Football Association) Charlton Athletic
	MF	Ian Handysides	14 December 1962 (aged 18)			(The Football Association) Birmingham City
	FW	**Mark Walters**	2 June 1964 (aged 16)			(The Football Association) Aston Villa
	DF	David Barnes	16 November 1961 (aged 19)			(The Football Association) Coventry City
	FW	John Pearson	1 September 1963 (aged 17)			(The Football Association) Sheffield Wednesday
	MF	Ray Walker	28 September 1963 (aged 17)			(The Football Association) Aston Villa
	MF	Shaun Brooks	9 October 1962 (aged 18)			(The Football Association) Crystal Palace F.C.
	GK	G Westwood	1 January 1962 (aged 19)			NA

=== Scotland ===
Head coach:

=== Spain ===
Head coach:
