= Paweł Barylski =

Polish football coach (born 1975)

Personal information
- Full name: Paweł Barylski
- Date of birth: 20 September 1975 (age 51)
- Place of birth: Łódź, Poland
- Height: 1.80 m (5 ft 11 in)

Team information
- Current team: Chrobry Głogów (assistant)

Senior career*
| Years | Team | Apps | (Gls) |
| –1999 | MKS Łodzianka | | |

Managerial career
- 2007–2015: Śląsk Wrocław (assistant)
- 2010: Śląsk Wrocław (caretaker)
- 2012: Śląsk Wrocław (caretaker)
- 2016–2017: Miedź Legnica (assistant)
- 2017–2018: Poland U20 (assistant)
- 2018–2021: Śląsk Wrocław (assistant)
- 2018–2019: Śląsk Wrocław (caretaker)
- 2021: Górnik Polkowice
- 2022: Kuwait (assistant)
- 2023–2024: Stal Mielec (assistant)
- 2025–: Chrobry Głogów (assistant)
- * Club domestic league appearances and goals

Paweł Barylski (born 20 September 1975) is a Polish football coach. Usually an assistant manager, he was the interim manager of Śląsk Wrocław on three occasions. He currently serves as the assistant coach of I liga club Chrobry Głogów.

== Career ==
Barylski played for MKS Łodzianka, but retired at the age of 24 when he realised he was not good enough for a career in football. After retiring from football, Barylski held positions with the Lotnik Wrocław youth team and the Gawina Królewska Wola's reserve side. In 2010, Barylski became interim manager of Śląsk Wrocław, before taking on the role of assistant manager under Orest Lenczyk upon his appointment. After Lenczyk was sacked in 2012, Barylski became the interim manager again. After being part of the coaching staff, Barylski once again became the assistant manager with the newly appointed Tadeusz Pawłowski. In 2016 Barylski joined the coaching staff of Miedź Legnica for a season, becoming the assistant manager to Ryszard Tarasiewicz. After Tarasiewicz was sacked by Miedź, Barylski once again joined Śląsk Wrocław in 2018, teaming up with Tadeusz Pawłowski for the second time. After Pawłowski was sacked by Śląsk, Barylski became the interim manager for the third time.

== Managerial statistics ==
As of match played 3 December 2021

Managerial record by team and tenure
| Team | From | To | Record | | | | | | | |
| Team | From | To | G | W | D | L | GF | GA | GD | Win % |
|---|---|---|---|---|---|---|---|---|---|---|
| Śląsk Wrocław (caretaker) | 22 September 2010 | 27 September 2010 | 1 | 0 | 0 | 1 | 1 | 2 | −1 | 0.00 |
| Śląsk Wrocław (caretaker) | 31 August 2012 | 3 September 2012 | 1 | 1 | 0 | 0 | 1 | 0 | +1 | 100.00 |
| Śląsk Wrocław (caretaker) | 11 December 2018 | 3 January 2019 | 2 | 0 | 1 | 1 | 2 | 3 | −1 | 0.00 |
| Górnik Polkowice | 25 June 2021 | 3 December 2021 | 21 | 1 | 10 | 10 | 18 | 39 | −21 | 4.76 |
| Total | | | 25 | 2 | 11 | 12 | 22 | 44 | −22 | 8.00 |
