= Germán Darío Rodríguez =

Argentine footballer

Personal information
- Full name: Germán Darío Osvaldo Rodríguez
- Date of birth: 25 January 1968 (age 58)
- Place of birth: Buenos Aires, Argentina
- Height: 1.83 m (6 ft 0 in)
- Position: Midfielder

Senior career*
| Years | Team | Apps | (Gls) |
- Deportivo Español
- Club Olimpo
| 1991 | Lech Poznań | 5 | (0) |
- * Club domestic league appearances and goals

Germán Darío Osvaldo Rodríguez (born 25 January 1968) is an Argentinian retired footballer who played primarily as midfielder.

== Club career ==
Rodríguez began his career at Deportivo Español, moving to Club Olimpo at the beginning of the 1990s. In the spring of 1991 he joined Polish I liga site Lech Poznań, becoming first foreign player in club's history. He made his league debut in 0–0 draw against Olimpia Poznań on 30 March 1991. Representing the club in 1990–91 season Rodríguez made 5 league appearances without any goal scored.
