= Zygmunt Garłowski =

Polish footballer

Personal information
- Date of birth: 5 October 1949
- Place of birth: Bielawa, Poland
- Date of death: 1 June 2007 (aged 57)
- Place of death: Sydney, Australia
- Position: Midfielder

Senior career*
| Years | Team | Apps | (Gls) |
| –1967 | Bielawianka Bielawa | | |
| 1967–1973 | Górnik Wałbrzych | | |
| 1973–1981 | Śląsk Wrocław | | |
| 1985 | Polar Wrocław | | |

International career
| 1974–1976 | Poland | 3 | (0) |
- * Club domestic league appearances and goals

Zygmunt Garłowski (5 October 1949 – 1 June 2007) was a Polish footballer who played as a midfielder.

He played in three matches for the Poland national team from 1974 to 1976.

== Biography ==
He began his career as a midfielder, although in the later stages he was increasingly deployed in defence. Garłowski started his football journey with Bielawianka Bielawa. In 1967, he transferred to second‑division Górnik Wałbrzych, where he was joined a year later by his brother, Ireneusz Garłowski. He featured not only for the senior side—scoring eight goals in his debut season—but also for the junior team, which he helped lead to the Polish championship title in 1968. In the 1971–72 season, with eleven goals, he finished as the runner‑up in the Second League scoring charts.

In 1973, he and his brother Ireneusz moved to top‑flight Śląsk Wrocław, marking the most successful period of his career. With the club, he won the Polish championship in 1977 and finished as vice‑champion in 1978. He also lifted the Polish Cup in 1976 and reached the quarter‑finals of the European Cup Winners’ Cup.

He left Śląsk in 1981 and moved to Australia, where he continued his career first as a player and later as a coach. After five years abroad, he returned to Poland and played for Polar Wrocław before eventually settling once again in Australia.

He died there at the age of 58 following a stroke. His body was brought back to Poland and he was laid to rest at the Osobowicki Cemetery in Wrocław.

== Honours ==
Śląsk Wrocław

- Ekstraklasa: 1976–77
- Polish Cup: 1975–76
