= Jan Erlich =

Polish footballer (1947–1998)

Personal information
- Date of birth: 9 January 1947
- Place of birth: Gdynia, Poland
- Date of death: 3 June 1998 (aged 51)
- Place of death: Degerfors, Sweden
- Height: 1.75 m (5 ft 9 in)
- Position: Midfielder

Senior career*
Years	Team	Apps	(Gls)
1965–1967	Arka Gdynia		
1967–1968	Legia Warsaw		
1968–1969	Zawisza Bydgoszcz		
1969–1973	Arka Gdynia		
1973–1978	Śląsk Wrocław		
1978–1981	Lechia Gdańsk		
1981–1983	Degerfors IF		

International career
1977	Poland	2	(0)
- * Club domestic league appearances and goals

Jan Erlich (9 January 1947 – 3 June 1998) was a Polish footballer who played as a midfielder.

He earned two caps for the Poland national team in 1977.

== Honours ==
Śląsk Wrocław

- Ekstraklasa: 1976–77
- Polish Cup: 1975–76
