= Adrian Budka =

Polish footballer and futsal player (born 1980)

- Budka with Widzew Łódź in 2016

Personal information
- Full name: Adrian Budka
- Date of birth: 26 January 1980 (age 46)
- Place of birth: Zduńska Wola, Poland
- Height: 1.74 m (5 ft 9 in)
- Position: Midfielder

Team information
- Current team: Pogoń Zduńska Wola
- Number: 16

Senior career*
Years	Team	Apps	(Gls)
1997–1998	MKS MOS Zduńska Wola		
1998–2001	Widzew Łódź	7	(0)
1999	→ Włókniarz Konstantynów (loan)		
2000–2001	→ Włókniarz Konstantynów (loan)		
2002–2003	Unia Skierniewice		
2003	Włókniarz Mirsk		
2003–2004	Polar Wrocław	32	(4)
2005–2006	Górnik Łęczna	3	(0)
2005–2006	→ Śląsk Wrocław (loan)	33	(2)
2006–2012	Widzew Łódź	150	(13)
2012–2013	Pogoń Szczecin	23	(3)
2013–2014	Arka Gdynia	29	(1)
2014–2015	Gatta Zduńska Wola (futsal)	8	(0)
2015–2017	Widzew Łódź	53	(5)
2017–2018	Unia Skierniewice	30	(2)
2018–	Pogoń Zduńska Wola	131	(11)

International career
2006	Poland	1	(0)
- * Club domestic league appearances and goals as of 22:06, 30 June 2026 (UTC)

Adrian Budka (Polish pronunciation: [ad.ˈri.jan ˈbut.ka]; born 26 January 1980) is a Polish footballer who plays as a midfielder for regional league club Pogoń Zduńska Wola.

== Career ==
Budka played for clubs such like Śląsk Wrocław, Polar Wrocław, Górnik Łęczna, Pogoń Szczecin and Arka Gdynia and above all, he played for Widzew Łódź where he became one of the most respected players among fans. In 2014, he returned to Zduńska Wola to join futsal team Gatta Zduńska Wola.

In August 2015, he re-joined Widzew Łódź to help them rebuild following bankruptcy and relegation to Polish fifth division.

Budka made one appearance for the Poland national team, in a friendly against United Arab Emirates on 6 December 2006.

== Honours ==
Widzew Łódź

- I liga: 2008–09, 2009–10
- IV liga Łódź: 2015–16

Unia Skierniewice

- IV liga Łódź: 2017–18
