= Adam Zejer =

Polish footballer

Personal information
- Date of birth: 3 November 1963 (age 62)
- Place of birth: Olsztyn, Poland
- Height: 1.68 m (5 ft 6 in)
- Position: Midfielder

Youth career
- Stomil Olsztyn

Senior career*
Years	Team	Apps	(Gls)
1986–1991	Zagłębie Lubin	111+	(10+)
1991–1992	Beşiktaş	12	(0)
1992–1993	Gaziantepspor	24	(1)
1993–1994	VfL Herzlake		
1994–1996	Stomil Olsztyn	60	(7)
1997–1998	Warmia Olsztyn		
1998–1999	Świt Nowy Dwór Mazowiecki		
2000–2001	Polonia Lidzbark Warmiński		
2002	Stomil Olsztyn	24	(0)
2003	Wigry Suwałki		
2008	Polonia Lidzbark Warmiński		
2013–2014	GLKS Jonkowo		

International career
1987–1991	Poland	5	(0)

Managerial career
- Błękitni Korona
- 2021–2022: Stomil Olsztyn (U19)
- 2022: Start Nidzica
- * Club domestic league appearances and goals

Adam Zejer (born 3 November 1963) is a Polish former professional footballer who played as a midfielder. He played for clubs such as Zagłębie Lubin, Stomil Olsztyn, Beşiktaş, and Gaziantepspor, including others.

== Club career ==
Zejer spent two seasons in the Turkish Super Lig with Beşiktaş and Gaziantepspor and many seasons in the Ekstraklasa with Zagłębie Lubin and Stomil Olsztyn.

== International career ==
Zejer made five appearances for the Poland national team, his debut coming in a friendly against East Germany on 19 August 1987.

== Honours ==
Zagłębie Lubin

- Ekstraklasa: 1990–91

Beşiktaş

- Süper Lig: 1991–92
