= Modest Boguszewski =

Polish footballer (born 1963)

Personal information
- Date of birth: 8 January 1963 (age 63)
- Place of birth: Lublin, Poland
- Height: 1.85 m (6 ft 1 in)
- Position: Defender

Senior career*
Years	Team	Apps	(Gls)
1981–1986	Motor Lublin	115	(0)
1986–1991	Śląsk Wrocław	52	(1)
1991–1992	Stal Mielec	30	(0)
1992–1994	Siarka Tarnobrzeg	36	(0)
1994–1995	Radomiak Radom		
1995–1996	KS Lublinianka		
1996	Czarni Dęblin		
- Cisy Nałęczów
- Legion Tomaszowice
- Granica Chełm
- Sparta Rejowiec Fabryczny
1999–2000	Avia Świdnik		
2000–2001	Chełmianka Chełm		
2002	BKS Lublin		
- Orion Niedrzwica
2019–2020	Puławiak Puławy	5	(0)

International career
- Poland U18
1987	Poland	2	(0)

Managerial career
- 2002: BKS Lublin (player-manager)
- 2005–2007: Iskra Piotrowice
- 2007–2008: Start Krasnystaw
- 2010: Sparta Rejowiec Fabryczny
- 2011–2012: Motor Lublin
- 2014: Lublinianka
Medal record
Men's football
Representing Poland
UEFA European Under-18 Championship
Runner-up	1981 West Germany
- * Club domestic league appearances and goals

Modest Boguszewski (born 8 January 1963) is a Polish former professional football manager and player who played as a defender. He played in two matches for the Poland national football team in 1987.

== Honours ==
Poland U18

- UEFA European Under-18 Championship runner-up: 1981
