= Dariusz Rzeźniczek =

Polish footballer

Personal information
- Date of birth: 22 May 1968 (age 58)
- Place of birth: Chorzów, Poland
- Height: 1.76 m (5 ft 9 in)
- Position: Midfielder

Senior career*
Years	Team	Apps	(Gls)
1987–1994	GKS Katowice	110	(4)
1990	→ Śląsk Wrocław (loan)	7	(0)
1993	→ Ruch Radzionków (loan)		
1994–2000	GKS Bełchatów		
2000	KS Myszków		
2001	Stal Stalowa Wola		
2001–2010	Śląsk Świętochłowice		
2011–2013	Spójnia Osiek-Zimnodół		

International career
1996–1997	Poland	2	(0)

Managerial career
- 2008–2010: Śląsk Świętochłowice (player-manager)
- * Club domestic league appearances and goals

Dariusz Rzeźniczek (born 22 May 1968) is a Polish former professional footballer who played as a midfielder.

== Club career ==
Rzeźniczek began his professional career with GKS Katowice, and played in 110 Ekstraklasa league matches over eight seasons. Following the 1993–94 season, he moved to GKS Bełchatów where he spent the next six seasons and made another 80 Ekstraklasa league appearances.

== International career ==
Rzeźniczek made two appearances for the Poland national football team, his debut coming in a friendly match against Cyprus on 27 August 1996.

== Honours ==
GKS Katowice

- Polish Cup: 1990–91
- Polish Super Cup: 1991
