= Władysław Łach =

Polish football manager

Personal information
- Date of birth: 16 November 1945 (age 80)
- Place of birth: Kraków, Poland

Managerial career
- Years: Team
- 1989–1991: Hutnik Kraków
- 1992–1993: Wisłoka Dębica
- 1993–1995: GKS Bełchatów
- 1995–1996: MKS Kańczuga (sporting director)
- 1997: Hutnik Kraków
- 1997–2000: Górnik Łęczna
- 2000–2001: Śląsk Wrocław
- 2001–2002: Hutnik Kraków
- 2005–2006: Górnik Wieliczka
- 2006–2007: Cracovia (sporting director)
- 2007–2009: Stal Stalowa Wola
- 2011–2012: Cracovia II

Władysław Łach (born 16 November 1945) is a Polish football manager. He is the coordinator of Hutnik Kraków's U15 to U17 teams.

== Honours ==
Hutnik Kraków

- II liga: 1989–90

GKS Bełchatów

- II liga, group II: 1994–95
