= Joachim Stachuła =

Polish footballer

Personal information
- Date of birth: 1 February 1940
- Place of birth: Wałbrzych, Poland
- Date of death: 9 March 2013 (aged 73)
- Place of death: Wałbrzych, Poland
- Positions: Attacking midfielder; striker

Youth career
- –1962: Kolejarz Katowice

Senior career*
| Years | Team | Apps | (Gls) |
| 1962–1963 | Thorez Wałbrzych | | |
| 1963–1965 | Śląsk Wrocław | 55 | (14) |
| 1966–1973 | Zagłębie Wałbrzych/ Thorez Wałbrzych | 136+ | (22) |

International career
| 1958 | Poland U19 | 1 | (0) |
| 1963–1965 | Poland U23 | 8 | (3) |
| 1968 | Poland B | 1 | (0) |
| 1969 | Poland | 1 | (0) |

Managerial career
- unknown teams near Wałbrzych
- * Club domestic league appearances and goals

Joachim Stachuła (1 February 1940 – 9 March 2013) was a Polish footballer.

After winning promotion in 1964, he scored Śląsk Wrocław's first ever goal in the top flight, a 15th minute penalty against Gwardia Warsaw on 19 August 1964. In 1966, he returned to Thorez Wałbrzych, which changed their name to Zagłębie Wałbrzych in their promotion year in 1968. Stachuła played in 136 Ekstraklasa matches for them, scoring nine goals in six seasons.

He played in one match for the Poland national team on 30 April 1969 in a 3–1 win against Turkey. He previously represented the B national team and the youth teams.

He died aged 73 after a long illness.

== Bibliography ==
- Filip Podolski Śląsk Wrocław. 30 sezonów w ekstraklasie, n.d.
- Roman Szczurowski Zagłębie Wałbrzych w rozgrywkach ekstraklasy, wyd. Bytom 2009
