= Eugeniusz Cebrat =

Polish footballer (born 1955)

Personal information
- Date of birth: 25 February 1955 (age 71)
- Place of birth: Mysłowice, Poland
- Height: 1.87 m (6 ft 2 in)
- Position: Goalkeeper

Senior career*
Years	Team	Apps	(Gls)
1970–1971	Górnik Wesoła		
1971–1977	GKS Tychy		
1978–1979	Śląsk Wrocław		
1980–1983	GKS Tychy		
1983–1986	Górnik Zabrze	74	(0)
1986–1988	FC Gütersloh	72	(0)
1988–1992	Stal Stalowa Wola		
1992–1993	Polonia Hamburg		
1993–1994	MZKS Alwernia		
1995–1996	Carbo Gliwice		

International career
1976–1986	Poland	6	(0)
- * Club domestic league appearances and goals

Eugeniusz Cebrat (born 25 February 1955) is a Polish former professional footballer who played as a goalkeeper. Born in Mysłowice, his career started in a local team of Górnik Wesoła. In 1971, he moved to GKS Tychy, where in 1976 he became vice-champion of Poland. After several years in Tychy and a short stint with Śląsk Wrocław, in 1983 he moved to Górnik Zabrze,. Later, he played for German FC Gütersloh and, after returning to Poland, in Stal Stalowa Wola. He earned six caps for the Poland national team.

== Honours ==
Górnik Zabrze

- Ekstraklasa: 1984–85
