= Marcin Dymkowski =

Polish footballer

Personal information
- Full name: Marcin Dymkowski
- Date of birth: 10 March 1981 (age 45)
- Place of birth: Wrocław, Poland
- Height: 1.84 m (6 ft 0 in)
- Position: Defender

Senior career*
| Years | Team | Apps | (Gls) |
| 2000 | LKS Jankowy | | |
| 2000 | Śląsk Wrocław | 0 | (0) |
| 2001 | Pogoń Oleśnica | | |
| 2002–2004 | Miedź Legnica | | |
| 2004–2007 | Odra Wodzisław | 74 | (2) |
| 2007–2008 | Lech Poznań | 7 | (0) |
| 2008–2010 | Odra Wodzisław | 46 | (3) |
| 2010–2011 | Pogoń Szczecin | 23 | (1) |
| 2011 | Sandecja Nowy Sącz | 4 | (0) |
| 2012 | MKS Kluczbork | 10 | (0) |
| 2012–2013 | Calisia Kalisz | 22 | (1) |

Managerial career
- 2015: MKS Oława
- 2015: Polonia-Stal Świdnica
- 2016–2019: Foto-Higiena Gać
- 2024: Śląsk Wrocław (caretaker)
- * Club domestic league appearances and goals

Marcin Dymkowski (born 10 March 1981) is a Polish professional football manager and former player. He most recently served as Śląsk Wrocław's co-caretaker.

== Career ==
In June 2010, he joined Pogoń Szczecin on a one-year contract. He was released from Pogoń on 10 June 2011.

In July 2011, he moved to Sandecja Nowy Sącz on a one-year contract.

== Managerial statistics ==
As of match played 3 December 2024

Managerial record by team and tenure
| Team | From | To | Record | | | | | | | |
| Team | From | To | G | W | D | L | GF | GA | GD | Win % |
|---|---|---|---|---|---|---|---|---|---|---|
| MKS Oława | 10 January 2015 | 30 June 2015 | 18 | 8 | 4 | 6 | 23 | 22 | +1 | 44.44 |
| Polonia-Stal Świdnica | 11 July 2015 | 23 December 2015 | 21 | 8 | 5 | 8 | 22 | 27 | −5 | 38.10 |
| Foto-Higiena Gać | 21 January 2016 | 9 July 2019 | 128 | 78 | 22 | 28 | 301 | 147 | +154 | 60.94 |
| Śląsk Wrocław (caretaker) | 12 November 2024 | 6 December 2024 | 3 | 0 | 2 | 1 | 3 | 4 | −1 | 0.00 |
| Total | | | 170 | 94 | 33 | 43 | 349 | 200 | +149 | 55.29 |

== Honours ==
=== Manager ===
Foto-Higiena Gać

- IV liga Lower Silesia East: 2016–17, 2017–18
- Polish Cup (Wrocław regionals): 2016–17
