= Michał Gębura =

Polish footballer

Personal information
- Date of birth: 10 November 1964 (age 61)
- Place of birth: Starachowice, Poland
- Height: 1.89 m (6 ft 2 in)
- Position: Defender

Senior career*
Years	Team	Apps	(Gls)
1981–1982	Star Starachowice		
1982–1988	Błękitni Kielce		
1988–1990	Siarka Tarnobrzeg		
1990–1992	Lech Poznań	54	(15)
1992–1993	Olimpia Poznań	11	(1)
1993	Assyriska FF		
1994–1996	Błękitni Kielce		
1996–1997	Bucovia Bukowa		

International career
1991	Poland	3	(0)
- * Club domestic league appearances and goals

Michał Gębura (born 10 November 1964) is a Polish former professional footballer who played as a defender.

He earned three caps for the Poland national team in 1991.

== Honours ==
Siarka Tarnobrzeg

- III liga, group VII: 1988–89

Lech Poznań

- Ekstraklasa: 1991–92
- Polish Super Cup: 1990, 1992

Individual

- III liga, group VII top scorer: 1988–89
