= 1976–77 Ekstraklasa =

51st season of top-tier football league in Poland

I liga
- Season: 1976–77
- Dates: 21 August 1976 – 25 May 1977
- Champions: Śląsk Wrocław (1st title)
- Relegated: GKS Tychy; ROW Rybnik
- European Cup: Śląsk Wrocław
- Cup Winners' Cup: Zagłębie Sosnowiec
- UEFA Cup: Widzew Łódź; Górnik Zabrze; Odra Opole (EC'77)
- Matches: 240
- Goals: 578 (2.41 per match)
- Top goalscorer: Włodzimierz Mazur (17 goals)
- Biggest home win: Odra 7–1 Lech
- Biggest away win: Pogoń 1–5 Zagłębie
- Highest scoring: Odra 7–1 Lech; Widzew 4–4 Pogoń
- Highest attendance: 40,000
- Total attendance: 3,445,920
- Average attendance: 14,358 ▲3.8%

The 1976–77 I liga was the 51st season of the Polish Football Championship and the 43rd season of the I liga, the top Polish professional league for association football clubs, since its establishment in 1927. The league was operated by the Polish Football Association (PZPN).

The champions were Śląsk Wrocław, who won their 1st Polish title.

== Competition modus ==
The season started on 21 August 1976 and concluded on 25 May 1977 (autumn-spring league). The season was played as a round-robin tournament. The team at the top of the standings won the league title. A total of 16 teams participated, 14 of which competed in the league during the 1975–76 season, while the remaining two were promoted from the 1975–76 II liga. Each team played a total of 30 matches, half at home and half away, two games against each other team. Teams received two points for a win and one point for a draw.

== League table ==
Pos	Team	Pld	W	D	L	GF	GA	GD	Pts	Qualification or relegation
1	Śląsk Wrocław (C)	30	17	7	6	38	32	+6	41	Qualification to European Cup first round
2	Widzew Łódź	30	14	10	6	46	31	+15	38	Qualification to UEFA Cup first round
3	Górnik Zabrze	30	15	7	8	41	32	+9	37	Qualification to UEFA Cup first round
4	Stal Mielec	30	14	8	8	42	30	+12	36	
5	Zagłębie Sosnowiec	30	12	11	7	40	28	+12	35	Qualification to Cup Winners' Cup first round
6	Pogoń Szczecin	30	14	7	9	38	44	−6	35	
7	ŁKS Łódź	30	12	9	9	35	29	+6	33	
8	Legia Warsaw	30	12	6	12	40	38	+2	30	
9	Wisła Kraków	30	9	9	12	32	33	−1	27	
10	Szombierki Bytom	30	11	5	14	34	35	−1	27	
11	Arka Gdynia	30	10	7	13	27	32	−5	27	
12	Odra Opole (Note: Odra Opole won the Polish League Cup, therefore giving them the third UEFA Cup spot.)	30	8	10	12	36	39	−3	26	Qualification to UEFA Cup first round
13	Ruch Chorzów	30	8	10	12	30	40	−10	26	
14	Lech Poznań	30	9	5	16	37	48	−11	23	
15	GKS Tychy (R)	30	5	11	14	33	41	−8	21	Relegated to II liga
16	ROW Rybnik (R)	30	5	8	17	29	46	−17	18	Relegated to II liga

Source: 90minut.pl (in Polish)
(C) Champions; (R) Relegated

== Results ==
Home \ Away	ARK	TYC	GÓR	LPO	LEG	ŁKS	OOP	POG	RYB	RUC	STA	SZO	ŚLĄ	WID	WIS	ZSO
Arka Gdynia		2–1	2–2	1–0	1–2	0–0	1–0	2–1	0–0	4–1	2–1	0–1	2–0	2–2	1–0	1–1
GKS Tychy	0–1		0–1	1–1	1–1	1–2	1–1	5–0	2–0	0–0	1–2	3–2	1–1	1–1	5–0	1–0
Górnik Zabrze	2–0	1–1		4–1	2–2	2–0	1–1	2–0	2–1	3–0	3–0	2–1	2–2	2–1	0–1	0–0
Lech Poznań	0–2	3–1	4–0		1–2	0–0	0–0	5–0	4–0	1–1	1–5	1–2	2–0	1–0	2–1	1–0
Legia Warsaw	2–1	2–1	0–1	2–0		3–0	1–0	0–1	0–0	1–1	3–2	2–1	0–1	4–1	1–0	3–0
ŁKS Łódź	2–0	3–1	1–0	0–0	3–2		3–1	0–1	2–1	0–2	0–0	4–0	2–3	0–1	2–0	2–1
Odra Opole	3–0	1–1	0–2	7–1	4–1	2–0		1–1	1–0	0–0	2–3	2–1	0–1	1–3	2–0	3–3
Pogoń Szczecin	2–0	3–1	3–0	2–1	2–1	0–0	1–0		3–2	1–1	0–0	2–1	1–2	1–0	2–1	1–5
ROW Rybnik	2–0	1–0	0–1	1–3	2–0	0–1	0–1	0–1		4–2	3–1	0–0	1–2	2–2	3–3	0–1
Ruch Chorzów	1–0	2–0	0–1	4–1	1–0	2–5	0–0	2–0	0–0		0–2	1–2	3–1	2–1	0–1	1–3
Stal Mielec	2–1	3–0	2–0	2–0	1–1	2–1	1–1	3–0	3–1	1–1		1–0	1–1	1–0	1–0	0–1
Szombierki Bytom	2–1	0–0	2–1	2–1	1–1	2–0	3–0	0–1	2–2	3–0	2–0		0–1	0–1	0–0	2–0
Śląsk Wrocław	1–0	0–0	2–0	1–0	2–1	0–0	2–0	2–2	3–2	2–0	1–0	2–1		0–0	2–0	2–0
Widzew Łódź	0–0	3–1	2–2	1–0	2–0	0–0	3–2	4–4	3–1	1–1	3–1	2–0	4–0		1–0	1–0
Wisła Kraków	1–0	3–1	0–1	4–1	3–1	2–2	0–0	1–1	0–0	1–0	1–1	3–1	5–0	0–1		1–1
Zagłębie Sosnowiec	0–0	1–1	3–1	2–1	2–1	0–0	5–0	2–1	3–0	1–1	0–0	1–0	2–1	2–2	0–0	

Source: 90minut.pl (in Polish)
Legend: Blue = home team win; Yellow = draw; Red = away team win.

== Top goalscorers ==
Rank	Player	Club	Goals
1	(Poland) Włodzimierz Mazur	Zagłębie Sosnowiec	17
2	(Poland) Leszek Wolski	Pogoń Szczecin	14
3	(Poland) Władysław Dąbrowski	Legia Warsaw	13
4	(Poland) Zygmunt Garłowski	Śląsk Wrocław	12
4	(Poland) Wojciech Tyc	Odra Opole	12
6	(Poland) Andrzej Milczarski	ŁKS Łódź	11
6	(Poland) Andrzej Szarmach	Stal Mielec	11
6	(Poland) Eugeniusz Nagiel	Szombierki Bytom	11
9	(Poland) Zenon Kasztelan	Pogoń Szczecin	10
9	(Poland) Roman Ogaza	GKS Tychy	10
9	(Poland) Stanisław Gzil	Górnik Zabrze	10
9	(Poland) Tadeusz Nowak	Legia Warsaw	10
9	(Poland) Janusz Sybis	Śląsk Wrocław	10

== Attendances ==
#	Club	Average
1	Pogoń Szczecin	21,800
2	ŁKS	20,533
3	Lech Poznań	19,133
4	Śląsk Wrocław	18,733
5	Arka Gdynia	18,600
6	Legia Warszawa	18,400
7	Wisła Kraków	15,533
8	Górnik Zabrze	15,267
9	Widzew Łódź	14,467
10	Tychy	12,800
11	Odra Opole	12,267
12	Stal Mielec	11,933
13	Zagłębie Sosnowiec	11,667
14	Ruch Chorzów	7,767
15	ROW	6,900
16	Szombierki Bytom	3,933

== Bibliography ==
- Gowarzewski, Andrzej (2000). Encyklopedia Piłkarska Fuji. Liga Polska. O tytuł mistrza Polski 1920–2000 (in Polish). GiA, Katowice. ISBN 83-88232-02-9.
