= Jerzy Dworczyk =

Polish footballer (born 1955)

Personal information
- Date of birth: 6 December 1955 (age 70)
- Place of birth: Sosnowiec, Poland
- Height: 1.75 m (5 ft 9 in)
- Position: Forward

Senior career*
Years	Team	Apps	(Gls)
- GKS Dąbrowa Górnicza
1974–1982	Zagłębie Sosnowiec	138	(27)
1982–1987	ROW Rybnik		
1987–1991	Grodziec Będzin		

International career
1978	Poland	1	(0)

Managerial career
- –1999: Grodziec Będzin
- Unia Strzemieszyce
- 2001: Zagłębie Sosnowiec
- 2006–2007: Zagłębie Sosnowiec
- 2009: Zagłębie Sosnowiec
- * Club domestic league appearances and goals

Jerzy Dworczyk (born 6 December 1955) is a Polish former professional football manager and player.

He made one appearance for the Poland national team in 1978.

== Honours ==
Zagłębie Sosnowiec

- Polish Cup: 1976–77, 1977–78
