= Andrzej Milczarski =

Polish footballer (born 1955)

Personal information
- Date of birth: 3 February 1955 (age 71)
- Height: 1.83 m (6 ft 0 in)
- Position: Forward

Senior career*
Years	Team	Apps	(Gls)
1973–1978	ŁKS Łódź	111	(27)
1979–1980	Zawisza Bydgoszcz		
1981–1983	ŁKS Łódź	58	(18)
1983	Zagłębie Sosnowiec	11	(1)
1984–1985	Wiener Sport-Club		

International career
1980	Poland	1	(0)
- * Club domestic league appearances and goals

Andrzej Milczarski (born 3 February 1955) is a Polish former professional footballer who played as a forward. He made one appearance for the Poland national team in 1980.
