= Włodzimierz Mazur =

Polish footballer (1954–1988)

Personal information
- Date of birth: 14 April 1954
- Place of birth: Opatów, Poland
- Date of death: 1 December 1988 (aged 34)
- Place of death: Sosnowiec, Poland
- Height: 1.74 m (5 ft 9 in)
- Position: Striker

Youth career
- Górnik Kazimierz

Senior career*
Years	Team	Apps	(Gls)
1973–1983	Zagłębie Sosnowiec	282	(79)
1983–1985	Rennes	28	(4)
1985–1986	Zagłębie Sosnowiec	7	(1)
1986–1987	Górnik Wojkowice		

International career
1976–1982	Poland	23	(3)
- * Club domestic league appearances and goals

Włodzimierz Mazur (18 April 1954 – 1 December 1988) was a Polish professional footballer who played as a striker.

He played mostly for Zagłębie Sosnowiec and spent two seasons in France with Rennes. He made 23 appearances scoring 2 goals for the Poland national team and was a participant at the 1978 FIFA World Cup.

In 1988, he died suddenly at the age of 34.

== Honours ==
Zagłębie Sosnowiec

- Polish Cup: 1976–77, 1977–78

Individual

- Ekstraklasa top scorer: 1976–77
