= 1990–91 Ekstraklasa =

64th season of top-tier football league in Poland

Liga
- Season: 1990–91
- Champions: Zagłębie Lubin (1st title)
- Relegated: Stal Mielec; Zagłębie Sosnowiec
- Matches: 238
- Goals: 572 (2.4 per match)
- Top goalscorer: Tomasz Dziubiński (21 goals)
- Average attendance: 4,471 ▼39.6%

Statistics of Ekstraklasa for the 1990–91 season.

== Overview ==
The league was contested by 16 teams, and Zagłębie Lubin won the championship.

== League table ==
| Pos | Team | Pld | W | D | L | GF | GA | GD | Pts | Qualification |
|---|---|---|---|---|---|---|---|---|---|---|
| 1 | Zagłębie Lubin (C) | 30 | 18 | 8 | 4 | 49 | 25 | +24 | 44 | Qualification to European Cup first round |
| 2 | Górnik Zabrze | 30 | 15 | 10 | 5 | 55 | 24 | +31 | 40 | Qualification to UEFA Cup first round |
| 3 | Wisła Kraków | 30 | 13 | 14 | 3 | 52 | 26 | +26 | 40 | |
| 4 | GKS Katowice | 30 | 16 | 7 | 7 | 33 | 26 | +7 | 39 | Qualification to Cup Winners' Cup first round |
| 5 | Hutnik Kraków | 30 | 14 | 9 | 7 | 53 | 34 | +19 | 37 | |
| 6 | Lech Poznań | 30 | 10 | 13 | 7 | 48 | 28 | +20 | 33 | |
| 7 | Śląsk Wrocław | 30 | 12 | 9 | 9 | 41 | 37 | +4 | 33 | |
| 8 | Olimpia Poznań | 30 | 9 | 12 | 9 | 37 | 41 | −4 | 30 | |
| 9 | Legia Warsaw | 30 | 8 | 12 | 10 | 24 | 24 | 0 | 28 | |
| 10 | Motor Lublin | 30 | 10 | 8 | 12 | 33 | 38 | −5 | 28 | |
| 11 | ŁKS Łódź | 30 | 11 | 6 | 13 | 25 | 36 | −11 | 28 | |
| 12 | Pegrotour Dębica | 30 | 7 | 12 | 11 | 29 | 44 | −15 | 26 | |
| 13 | Ruch Chorzów | 30 | 7 | 11 | 12 | 25 | 34 | −9 | 25 | |
| 14 | Zawisza Bydgoszcz | 30 | 8 | 7 | 15 | 27 | 41 | −14 | 23 | |
| 15 | Stal Mielec | 30 | 3 | 10 | 17 | 25 | 49 | −24 | 16 | Qualification to Relegation playoffs |
| 16 | Zagłębie Sosnowiec | 30 | 2 | 6 | 22 | 21 | 69 | −48 | 10 | Qualification to Relegation playoffs |

Source: 90minut.pl (in Polish)
(C) Champions

== Results ==
| Home \ Away | KAT | GÓR | HUT | LPO | LEG | ŁKS | MOL | OLP | PRG | RUC | STA | ŚLĄ | WIS | ZLU | ZSO | ZAW |
|---|---|---|---|---|---|---|---|---|---|---|---|---|---|---|---|---|
| GKS Katowice | | 2–1 | 2–3 | 1–1 | 1–0 | 2–0 | 1–0 | 2–1 | 1–0 | 1–0 | 1–0 | 0–1 | 0–2 | 1–1 | 3–0 | 1–0 |
| Górnik Zabrze | 2–0 | | 1–1 | 0–1 | 3–1 | 2–0 | 2–2 | 6–1 | 0–0 | 3–0 | 3–0 | 0–0 | 2–2 | 2–2 | 3–0 | 3–1 |
| Hutnik Kraków | 0–0 | 2–0 | | 2–3 | 4–2 | 5–0 | 2–4 | 2–1 | 1–1 | 2–0 | 2–2 | 1–1 | 0–2 | 3–0 | 0–0 | 4–1 |
| Lech Poznań | 1–2 | 0–0 | 5–2 | | 1–1 | 1–1 | 4–0 | 0–0 | 6–0 | 0–1 | 2–0 | 1–2 | 0–0 | 2–1 | 1–1 | 2–2 |
| Legia Warsaw | 0–2 | 0–1 | 0–1 | 0–0 | | 0–0 | 0–1 | 1–1 | 1–0 | 2–0 | 1–0 | 3–1 | 0–0 | 0–0 | 0–0 | 4–2 |
| ŁKS Łódź | 1–0 | 0–1 | 0–2 | 1–0 | 2–1 | | 1–0 | 0–2 | 1–1 | 2–1 | 1–0 | 3–1 | 0–1 | 1–1 | 3–2 | 1–2 |
| Motor Lublin | 0–1 | 3–1 | 0–4 | 0–0 | 0–2 | 2–0 | | 1–3 | 0–1 | 0–0 | 1–1 | 2–1 | 1–1 | 1–2 | 2–1 | 2–0 |
| Olimpia Poznań | 3–0 | 1–2 | 1–2 | 3–2 | 0–0 | 1–0 | 0–2 | | 2–2 | 0–0 | 1–0 | 0–0 | 1–3 | 0–3 (Note: The match between Olimpia and Zagłębie (originally finished 1–1) verified to wo. An ineligible player fielded by Olimpia (Andrzej Przerada).) | 4–3 | 1–0 |
| Pegrotour Dębica | 0–2 | 0–5 | 0–2 | 0–3 | 1–0 | 1–1 | 0–0 | 2–2 | | 4–0 | 1–1 | 2–2 | 1–0 | 0–0 | 5–0 | 2–1 |
| Ruch Chorzów | 1–1 | 0–0 | 1–1 | 2–1 | 0–1 | 0–1 | 0–0 | 1–1 | 1–1 | | 5–1 | 1–1 | 3–2 | 0–1 | 2–0 | 0–0 |
| Stal Mielec | 2–2 | 0–0 | 1–1 | 0–0 | 1–1 | 1–2 | 1–3 | 0–3 | 2–0 | 0–2 | | 5–1 | 2–3 | 1–0 | 0–2 | 0–0 |
| Śląsk Wrocław | 1–1 | 1–4 | 2–0 | 0–0 | 0–0 | 2–0 | 2–1 | 3–0 | 2–1 | 1–2 | 2–1 | | 0–0 | 1–3 | 7–0 | 2–0 |
| Wisła Kraków | 5–1 | 1–1 | 1–1 | 3–3 | 0–0 | 0–0 | 1–1 | 0–0 | 4–1 | 5–2 | 3–0 | 3–0 | | 1–1 | 1–0 | 3–0 |
| Zagłębie Lubin | 0–0 | 2–1 | 2–1 | 2–1 | 1–0 | 2–1 | 2–0 | 0–0 | 4–0 | 2–0 | 3–2 | 2–1 | 3–1 | | 2–0 | 2–1 |
| Zagłębie Sosnowiec | 0–1 | 1–3 | 0–2 | 1–6 | 1–3 | 0–2 | 1–2 | 2–2 | 0–1 | 0–0 | 1–1 | 1–2 | 2–4 | 1–4 | | 1–0 |
| Zawisza Bydgoszcz | 0–1 | 0–3 | 1–0 | 0–2 | 0–0 | 2–0 | 3–2 | 2–2 | 1–1 | 1–0 | 2–0 | 0–1 | 0–0 | 2–1 | 3–0 | |

Source: 90minut.pl (in Polish)
Legend: Blue = home team win; Yellow = draw; Red = away team win.

== Relegation playoffs ==
The matches were played on 28 June and 1 July 1991.

| Team 1 | Agg. | Team 2 | 1st leg | 2nd leg |
|---|---|---|---|---|
| Pogoń Szczecin | 3–4 | Motor Lublin | 3–2 | 0–2 |
| GKS Jastrzębie | 0–2 | Zawisza Bydgoszcz | 0–0 | 0–2 |

== Top goalscorers ==
| Rank | Player | Club | Goals |
|---|---|---|---|
| 1 | (Poland) Tomasz Dziubiński | Wisła Kraków | 21 |
| 2 | (Poland) Mirosław Waligóra | Hutnik Kraków | 18 |
| 3 | (Poland) Ryszard Kraus | Górnik Zabrze | 16 |
| 4 | (Poland) Ryszard Cyroń | Górnik Zabrze | 15 |
| 5 | (Poland) Grzegorz Mielcarski | Olimpia Poznań | 14 |
| 6 | (Poland) Andrzej Juskowiak | Lech Poznań | 12 |
| 7 | (Poland) Michal Gebura | Lech Poznań | 11 |
| 8 | (Poland) Romuald Kujawa | Zagłębie Lubin | 10 |
| 8 | (Poland) Andrzej Sermak | Hutnik Kraków | 10 |

== Attendances ==
| # | Club | Average |
|---|---|---|
| 1 | Wisła Kraków | 7,867 |
| 2 | Hutnik Kraków | 6,500 |
| 3 | Górnik Zabrze | 6,134 |
| 4 | Zagłębie Lubin | 6,067 |
| 5 | Śląsk Wrocław | 5,921 |
| 6 | Lech Poznań | 5,463 |
| 7 | Zawisza Bydgoszcz | 5,227 |
| 8 | Stal Mielec | 4,294 |
| 9 | Pegrotour Dębica | 4,133 |
| 10 | Legia Warszawa | 3,676 |
| 11 | Motor Lublin | 3,467 |
| 12 | GKS Katowice | 3,324 |
| 13 | Ruch Chorzów | 2,482 |
| 14 | Olimpia Poznań | 2,364 |
| 15 | Zagłębie Sosnowiec | 2,353 |
| 16 | ŁKS | 2,270 |
