= Stanisław Gzil =

Polish footballer (born 1949)

Personal information
- Date of birth: 6 May 1949 (age 77)
- Place of birth: Jaworzno, Poland
- Height: 1.79 m (5 ft 10 in)
- Position: Forward

Youth career
- Azotania Jaworzno

Senior career*
Years	Team	Apps	(Gls)
1970–1972	Gwardia Warsaw	9	(1)
1972–1973	GKS Katowice		
1973–1979	Górnik Zabrze	142	(35)
1979–1984	Beerschot	135	(36)
1984–1985	Berchem Sport	28	(7)
1985–1987	Westerlo		

International career
1978	Poland	1	(0)

Managerial career
- 1988–1995: Cappellen
- 1996–1997: Germinal Ekeren
- 1997: Amica Wronki
- 1997–1999: Beveren
- 2000–2003: Cappellen
- 2010–2011: Cappellen
- * Club domestic league appearances and goals

Stanisław Gzil (born 6 May 1949) is a Polish retired football player and manager.

He played one game for the Poland national football team, in an April 1978 friendly match against Greece, coming on as a 46th-minute substitute for the legendary Grzegorz Lato.
