= Śląsk Wrocław =

Association football club in Poland

- Full name: Wrocławski Klub Sportowy Śląsk Wrocław Spółka Akcyjna
- Nicknames: WKS; Wojskowi (The Militarians)
- Founded: 1947; 79 years ago (De facto: 18 March 1946)
- Ground: Tarczyński Arena Wrocław
- Capacity: 45,105
- Owner: Wrocław
- Chairman: Remigiusz Jezierski
- Manager: Toni Golem
- League: Ekstraklasa
- 2025–26: I liga, 2nd of 18 (promoted)
- Website: www.slaskwroclaw.pl
Home colours	Away colours

Wrocławski Klub Sportowy Śląsk Wrocław, commonly referred to as Śląsk Wrocław (Polish pronunciation: [ɕlɔ̃zɡ ˈvrɔt͡swaf]), is a Polish professional football club based in Wrocław that plays in the Ekstraklasa, the top level of the Polish football league system.

Śląsk is a two-time Polish champion (1977, 2012), a four-time top-tier runner-up (1978, 1982, 2011, 2024), a two-time Polish Cup winner (1976, 1987), a two-time Polish Super Cup winner (1987, 2012) and a one-time Ekstraklasa Cup winner (2009).

The club's home is Tarczyński Arena Wrocław, a 45,105 capacity stadium in Wrocław which was one of the host venues during UEFA Euro 2012. The club previously played at Olympic Stadium and Stadion Oporowska.

== History ==
In 1946, the Officers' Sapper School was moved from Przemyśl to Wrocław. On March 18, 1946 at its founding meeting, the KS Pionier was established (origin of the name: Pioneers of Wrocław, Pioneer (military)). The club has had many names since its foundation. They are listed below;

- 1946 – Pionier Wrocław
- 1949 – Legia Wrocław
- 1950 – Centralny Wojskowy Klub Sportowy Wrocław
- 1951 – Okręgowy Wojskowy Klub Sportowy Wrocław
- 1957 – Wojskowy Klub Sportowy Śląsk Wrocław
- 1997 – Wrocławski Klub Sportowy Śląsk Wrocław Sportowa Spółka Akcyjna
- Wrocławski Klub Sportowy Śląsk Wrocław Spółka Akcyjna

Śląsk is the Polish name of Silesia, the historical region in which Wrocław is located.

== Honours ==
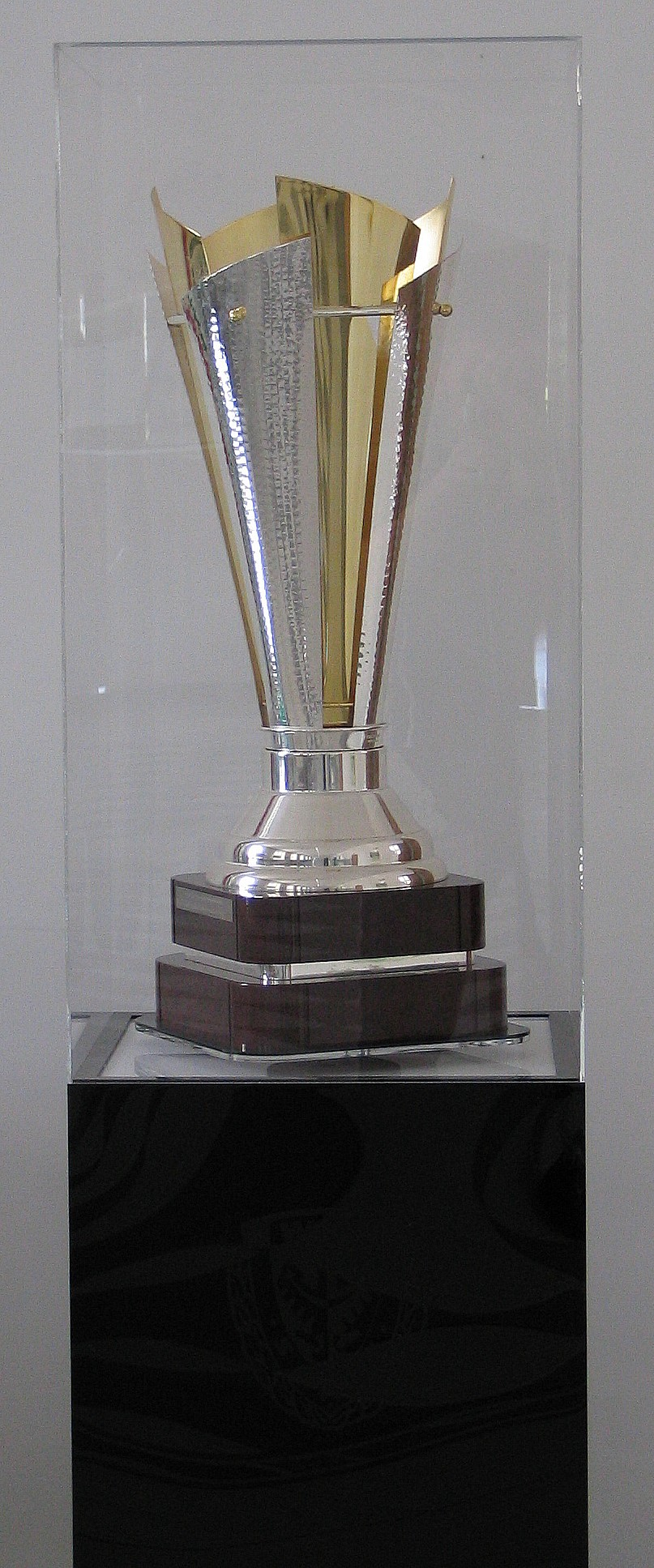
Ekstraklasa Cup

=== League ===
- Ekstraklasa
  - Champions: 1976–77, 2011–12
  - Runners-up: 1977–78, 1981–82, 2010–11, 2023–24

=== Cup ===
- Polish Cup
  - Winners: 1975–76, 1986–87
  - Runners-up: 2012–13
- Ekstraklasa Cup
  - Winners: 2008–09
- Polish Super Cup
  - Winners: 1987, 2012

=== Youth teams ===
- Polish U-19 Championship
  - Champions: 1978–79
  - Runners-up: 1976–77
- Polish U-17 Championship
  - Champions: 2023–24

== Stadium ==
The Wrocław Stadium is the highest fourth category football (soccer) stadium built for the 2012 UEFA European Football Championship. The Stadium is located on aleja Śląska in the western part of the city (Pilczyce district). It is the home stadium of the Śląsk Wrocław football team playing in the Polish PKO Ekstraklasa. The stadium has a capacity of 42,771 spectators, all seated and all covered. The Municipal Stadium in Wroclaw is the largest arena in Ekstraklasa and the third largest in the country (after National Stadium and Silesia Stadium). Stadium construction began in April 2009 and was completed in September 2011. Stadium opening took place at 10 September 2011 with boxing fight between Tomasz Adamek and Vitali Klitschko for WBC heavyweight title. The inaugural football match was held on 10 October 2011, between Śląsk Wrocław and Lechia Gdańsk. Śląsk won 1–0, with Johan Voskamp becoming the first goalscorer in the new stadium.

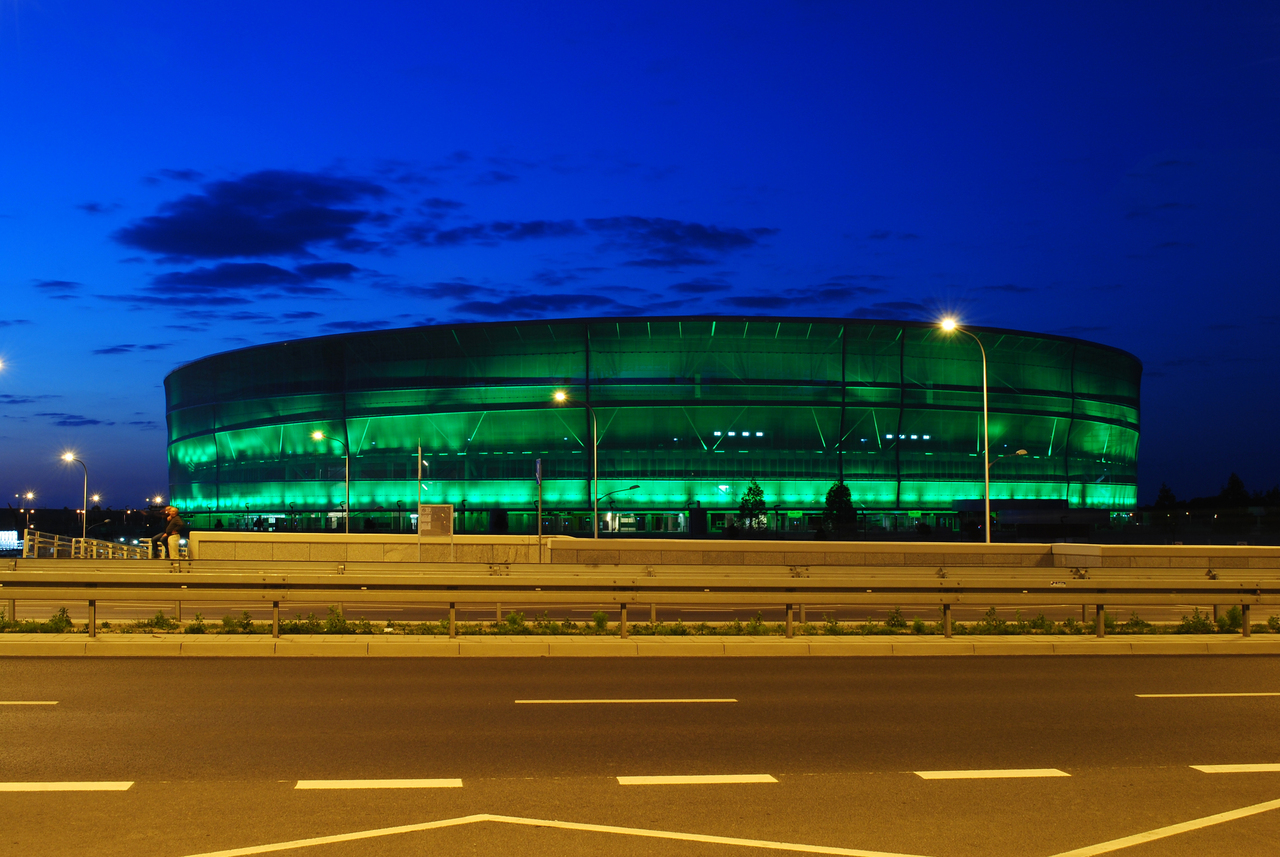
Municipal Stadium by night.

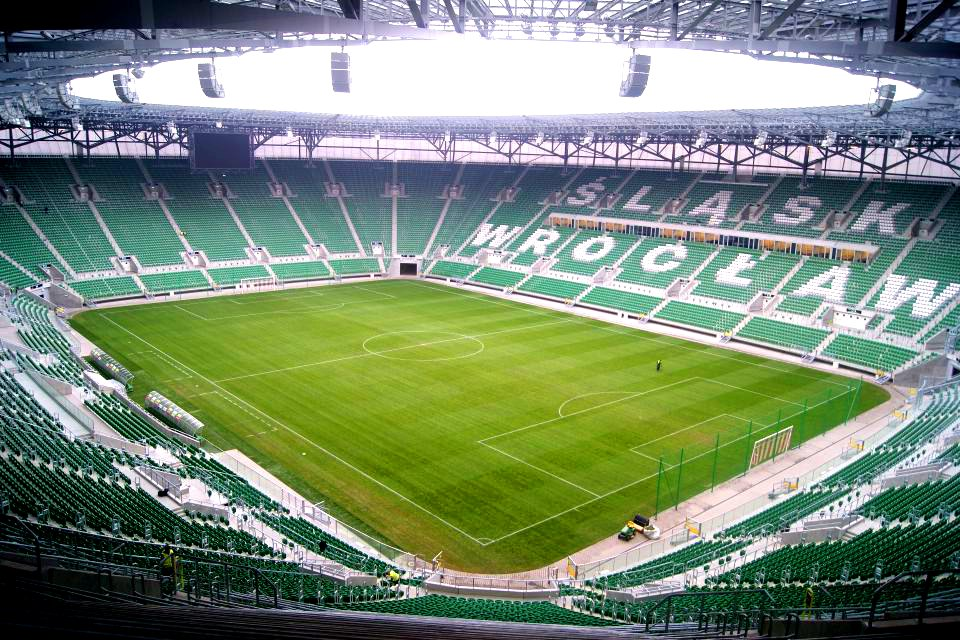
interior of the stadium.

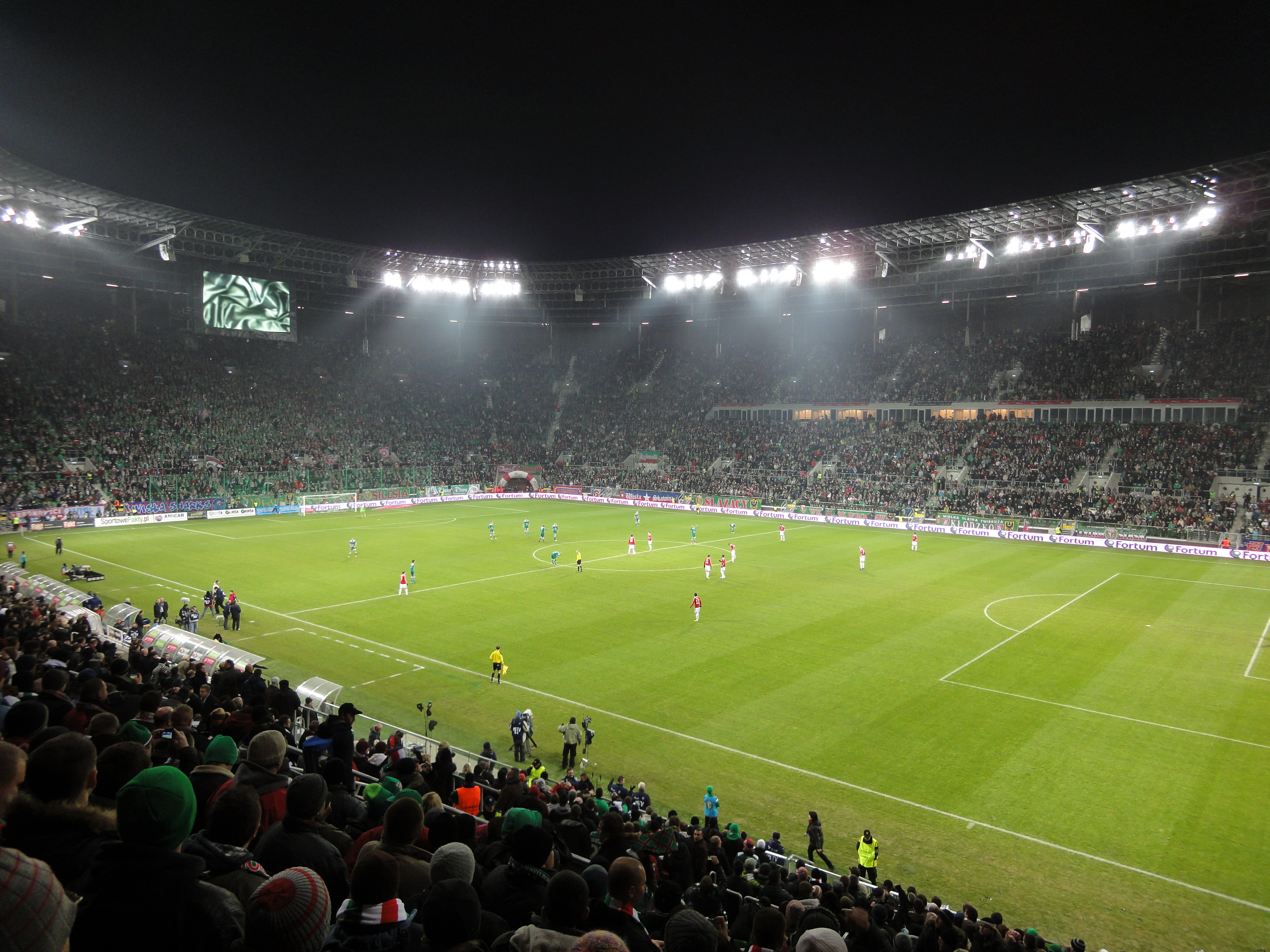
Śląsk Wrocław – Wisła Kraków (25 November 2011)

== League history ==
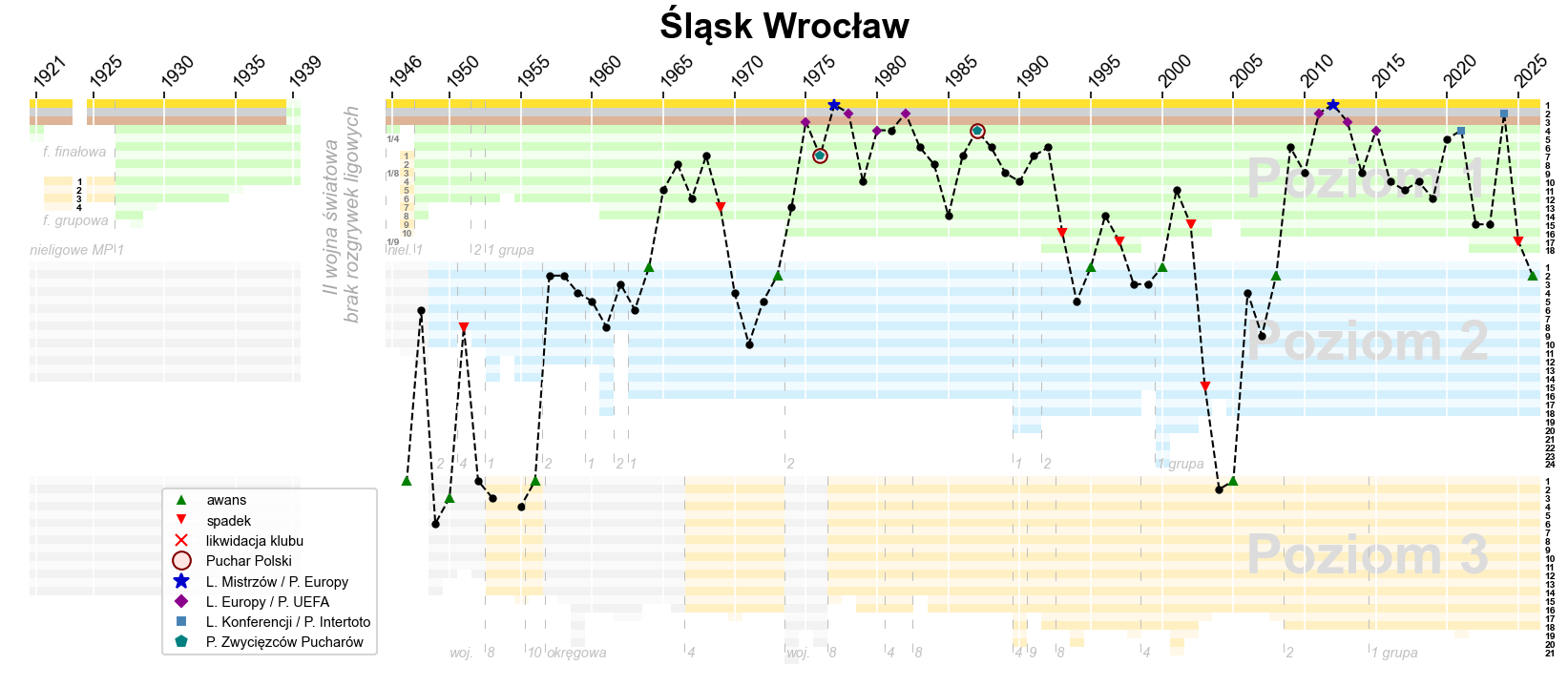
Chart of yearly table positions of Śląsk in the Polish league system

Tier	Seasons	First	Last	Promotions	Relegations	Most consecutive seasons
Ekstraklasa (tier 1)	46	1964–65	2024–25	▲13 times to Europe	▼5	20 (1973–1993)
Second tier	24	1947–48	2025–26	▲6	▼3	8 (1957–1964)
Third tier	9	1946–47	2004–05	▲4	never	2

== Śląsk Wrocław in European football ==
Śląsk Wrocław in European football
- Club: Śląsk Wrocław
- First entry: 1975–76 UEFA Cup
- Latest entry: 2024–25 UEFA Conference League

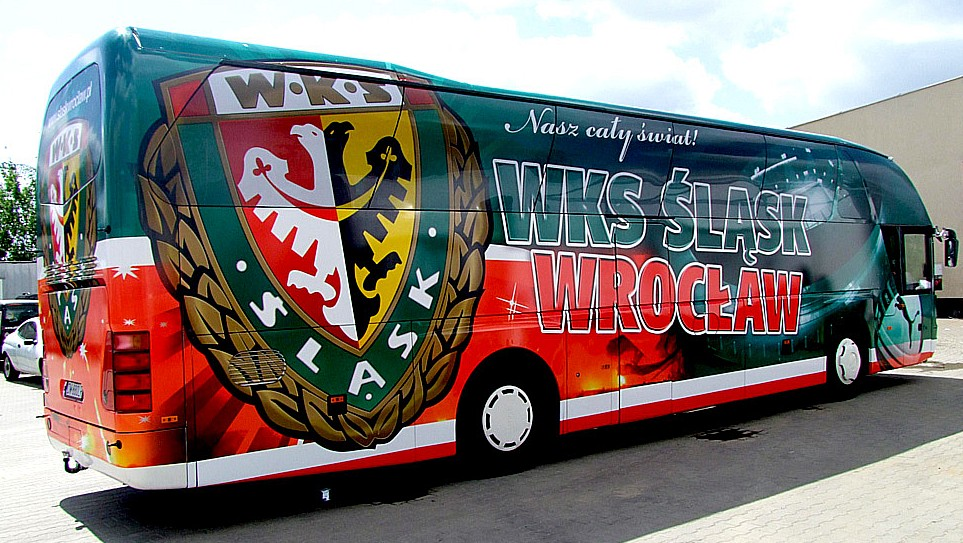
The team bus in 2011

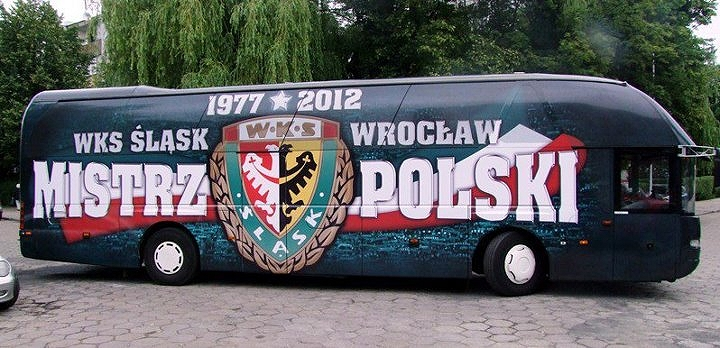
The team bus in season 2012–2013

Śląsk Wrocław's score is shown first in each case

Season	Competition	Round	Opponent	Home	Away	Aggregate
1975–76	UEFA Cup	1R	(Sweden) GAIS	4–2	1–2	5–4
1975–76	UEFA Cup	2R	(Belgium) Royal Antwerp	1–1	2–1	3–2
1975–76	UEFA Cup	3R	(England) Liverpool	1–2	0–3	1–5
1976–77	European Cup Winners' Cup	1R	(Malta) Floriana	2–0	4–1	6–1
1976–77	European Cup Winners' Cup	2R	(Republic of Ireland) Bohemians	3–0	1–0	4–0
1976–77	European Cup Winners' Cup	QF	(Italy) Napoli	0–0	0–2	0–2
1977–78	European Cup	1R	(Bulgaria) Levski-Spartak	2–2	0–3	2–5
1978–79	UEFA Cup	1R	(Cyprus) Pezoporikos	5–1	2–2	7–3
1978–79	UEFA Cup	2R	(Iceland) ÍBV Vestmannaeyjar	2–1	2–0	4–1
1978–79	UEFA Cup	3R	(Germany) Borussia Mönchengladbach	2–4	1–1	3–5
1980–81	UEFA Cup	1R	(Scotland) Dundee United	0–0	2–7	2–7
1982–83	UEFA Cup	1R	(Soviet Union) Dynamo Moscow	2–2	1–0	3–2
1982–83	UEFA Cup	2R	(Switzerland) Servette	0–2	1–5	1–7
1987–88	European Cup Winners' Cup	1R	(Spain) Real Sociedad	0–2	0–0	0–2
2011–12	UEFA Europa League	2Q	(Scotland) Dundee United	1–0	2–3	3–3 (a)
2011–12	UEFA Europa League	3Q	(Bulgaria) Lokomotiv Sofia	0–0	0–0	0–0 (4–3 p)
2011–12	UEFA Europa League	PO	(Romania) Rapid București	1–3	1–1	2–4
2012–13	UEFA Champions League	2Q	(Montenegro) Budućnost Podgorica	0–1	2–0	2–1
2012–13	UEFA Champions League	3Q	(Sweden) Helsingborg	0–3	1–3	1–6
2012–13	UEFA Europa League	PO	(Germany) Hannover 96	3–5	1–5	4–10
2013–14	UEFA Europa League	2Q	(Montenegro) Rudar Pljevlja	4–0	2–2	6–2
2013–14	UEFA Europa League	3Q	(Belgium) Club Brugge	1–0	3–3	4–3
2013–14	UEFA Europa League	PO	(Spain) Sevilla	0–5	1–4	1–9
2015–16	UEFA Europa League	1Q	(Slovenia) NK Celje	3–1	1–0	4–1
2015–16	UEFA Europa League	2Q	(Sweden) IFK Göteborg	0–0	0–2	0–2
2021–22	UEFA Europa Conference League	1Q	(Estonia) Paide Linnameeskond	2–0	2–1	4–1
2021–22	UEFA Europa Conference League	2Q	(Armenia) Ararat Yerevan	3–3	4–2	7–5
2021–22	UEFA Europa Conference League	3Q	(Israel) Hapoel Be'er Sheva	2–1	0−4	2−5
2024–25	UEFA Conference League	2Q	(Latvia) Riga	3–1	0–1	3–2
2024–25	UEFA Conference League	3Q	(Switzerland) St. Gallen	3–2	0–2	3–4

Notes

- 1Q: First qualifying round
- 2Q: Second qualifying round
- 3Q: Third qualifying round
- PO: Play-off round
- 1R: First round
- 2R: Second round
- 3R: Third round
- QF: Quarter-finals

=== Best results in European competitions ===
Season	Achievement	Notes
UEFA Cup Winners' Cup
1976–77	Quarter-final	lost to (Italy) Napoli 0–0 in Wrocław, 0–2 in Naples
UEFA Cup/UEFA Europa League
1975–76	Round of 16	lost to (England) Liverpool 1–2 in Wrocław, 0–3 in Liverpool
1978–79	Round of 16	lost to (West Germany) Borussia 1–1 in Mönchengladbach, 2–4 in Wrocław

== Players ==
=== Current squad ===
As of 9 September 2026

Note: Flags indicate national team as defined under FIFA eligibility rules; some limited exceptions apply. Players may hold more than one non-FIFA nationality.

No.	Pos.	Nation	Player
1	GK	POL	Karol Niemczycki
2	DF	POL	Dominik Szala (on loan from Górnik Zabrze)
3	DF	CYP	Irodotos Christodoulou
4	DF	AUT	Marko Dijakovic
5	DF	MTN	Lamine Ba
7	MF	POL	Piotr Samiec-Talar (captain)
8	DF	ESP	Marc Llinares
9	FW	CPV	Ieltsin Camões (on loan from Tromsø)
10	FW	FRA	Malaly Dembélé
11	MF	BIH	Luka Marjanac
14	MF	POL	Michał Mokrzycki
15	MF	VEN	Jorge Yriarte
17	MF	POL	Karol Linetty

No.	Pos.	Nation	Player
18	MF	POL	Karol Borys
19	FW	POL	Przemysław Banaszak
20	MF	POL	Grzegorz Tomasiewicz
21	FW	SWE	Alex Timossi Andersson
25	GK	POL	Michał Szromnik
26	DF	POL	Adrian Żulewski
27	DF	CRO	Jan Jurčec
31	GK	POL	Hubert Śliczniak
33	DF	UKR	Yehor Matsenko
38	MF	POL	Dorian Markowski
44	DF	POL	Mariusz Malec
77	MF	ALB	Eniss Shabani
88	MF	POL	Adam Ciućka

=== Other players under contract ===
Note: Flags indicate national team as defined under FIFA eligibility rules; some limited exceptions apply. Players may hold more than one non-FIFA nationality.

No.	Pos.	Nation	Player
81	MF	POL	Patryk Sokołowski
—	MF	POL	Damian Warchoł

=== Out on loan ===
Note: Flags indicate national team as defined under FIFA eligibility rules; some limited exceptions apply. Players may hold more than one non-FIFA nationality.

No.	Pos.	Nation	Player
24	MF	UKR	Yehor Sharabura (at Chrobry Głogów until 30 June 2027)
30	GK	POL	Bartosz Głogowski (at Sandecja Nowy Sącz until 30 June 2027)

No.	Pos.	Nation	Player
78	DF	POL	Tommaso Guercio (at Carrarese until 30 June 2027)
—	MF	POL	Aleksander Wołczek (at Warta Poznań until 30 June 2027)

=== Notable players ===
Had international caps for their respective countries.

Poland

- (Poland) Henryk Apostel (1971–72)
- (Poland) Łukasz Broź (2018–20)
- (Poland) Adrian Budka (2005–06)
- (Poland) Eugeniusz Cebrat (1978–79)
- (Poland) Piotr Celeban (2008–12, 2014–21)
- (Poland) Mateusz Cetnarski (2011–14)
- (Poland) Piotr Ćwielong (2010–13)
- (Poland) Jan Erlich (1973–78)
- (Poland) Roman Faber (1973–84)
- (Poland) Janusz Gancarczyk (2007–10)
- (Poland) Zygmunt Garłowski (1973–81)
- (Poland) Wojciech Golla (2018–20)
- (Poland) Janusz Góra (1985–92)
- (Poland) Jarosław Góra (1993–97)
- (Poland) Roman Jakóbczak (1966–69)
- (Poland) Tomasz Jodłowiec (2012)
- (Poland) Paweł Kaczorowski (2007)
- (Poland) Zygmunt Kalinowski (1971–79)
- (Poland) Przemysław Kaźmierczak (2010–14)
- (Poland) Jacek Kiełb (2015–16)
- (Poland) Adam Kokoszka (2013–14, 2015–18)
- (Poland) Jakub Kosecki (2017–18)
- (Poland) Zdzisław Kostrzewa (1979–84)
- (Poland) Marcin Kowalczyk (2012–13)
- (Poland) Rafał Lasocki (2007)
- (Poland) Rafał Leszczyński (2022–25)
- (Poland) Karol Linetty (2026–)
- (Poland) Antoni Łukasiewicz (2008–11)
- (Poland) Daniel Łukasik (2023–24)
- (Poland) Krzysztof Mączyński (2019–22)
- (Poland) Łukasz Madej (2009–12, 2016–17)
- (Poland) Adam Marciniak (2008)
- (Poland) Adam Matysek (1989–93)
- (Poland) Sebastian Mila (2008–14)
- (Poland) Mariusz Pawelec (2008–23)
- (Poland) Mariusz Pawełek (2014–17)
- (Poland) Tadeusz Pawłowski (1974–82)
- (Poland) Mirosław Pękala (1977–84)
- (Poland) Arkadiusz Piech (2017–19)
- (Poland) Dariusz Pietrasiak (2011–12)
- (Poland) Leszek Pisz (2001)
- (Poland) Przemysław Płacheta (2019–20)
- (Poland) Waldemar Prusik (1981–89)
- (Poland) Kazimierz Przybyś (1983–84)
- (Poland) Andrzej Rudy (1983–88)
- (Poland) Dariusz Rzeźniczek (1990)
- (Poland) Hubert Skowronek (1962–67)
- (Poland) Jakub Słowik (2017–19)
- (Poland) Waldemar Sobota (2010–13, 2020–22)
- (Poland) Joachim Stachuła (1963–66)
- (Poland) Janusz Sybis (1969–83)
- (Poland) Grzegorz Szamotulski (2001)
- (Poland) (United States) Stefan Szefer (1963–65)
- (Poland) Roman Szewczyk (1989)
- (Poland) Tadeusz Świcarz (1951)
- (Poland) Jakub Świerczok (2024–25)
- (Poland) Ryszard Tarasiewicz (1979–89)
- (Poland) Jan Tomaszewski (1967–70)
- (Poland) Marcin Wasilewski (2000–02)
- (Poland) Maciej Wilusz (2021)
- (Poland) Piotr Włodarczyk (2000–01)
- (Poland) Roman Wójcicki (1980–82)
- (Poland) Władysław Antoni Żmuda (1974–80)
- (Poland) Mateusz Żukowski (2023–25)

Bulgaria

- (Bulgaria) Aleks Petkov (2023–25)
- (Bulgaria) Simeon Petrov (2024–25)

Cape Verde

- (Cape Verde) Ieltsin Camões (2026–)

Czech Republic

- (Czech Republic) Lukáš Droppa (2014–15)
- (Czech Republic) Marcel Gecov (2015–16)
- (Czech Republic) Petr Schwarz (2021–26)

Gabon

- (Gabon) Éric Mouloungui (2013)

Georgia

- (Georgia (country)) Lasha Dvali (2016–17)

Hungary

- (Hungary) Márk Tamás (2020–22)

Iceland

- (Iceland) Daníel Leó Grétarsson (2022–23)

Japan

- (Japan) Ryota Morioka (2016–17)

Kosovo

- (Kosovo) Besar Halimi (2025–26)

Latvia

- (Latvia) Igors Tarasovs (2017–19)

Mauritania

- (Mauritania) Lamine Ba (2026–)

Montenegro

- (Montenegro) Filip Raičević (2020)

North Macedonia

- (North Macedonia) Ostoja Stjepanović (2016–17)

Palestine

- (Palestine) Assad Al Hamlawi (2025)

Romania

- (Romania) Tudor Băluță (2024–25)

Slovakia

- (Slovakia) Peter Grajciar (2015–17)
- (Slovakia) Ľuboš Kamenár (2016–17)

Slovenia

- (Slovenia) Boban Jović (2017–18)
- (Slovenia) Dalibor Stevanović (2012–14)

Zambia

- (Zambia) Lubambo Musonda (2019–21)

Zimbabwe

- (Zimbabwe) Ronald Sibanda (1997–98)

Venezuela

- (Venezuela) Jorge Yriarte (2025–)

== Managers ==
- (Czechoslovakia) Karel Finek (1958)
- (Czechoslovakia) Vilém Lugr (1959)
- (Poland) Artur Woźniak (1969–70)
- (Poland) Władysław Jan Żmuda (1971–77)
- (Poland) Aleksander Papiewski (1978–1979)
- (Poland) Orest Lenczyk (1979–81)
- (Poland) Stanisław Olearnik (interim) (July 1983–August 1983)
- (Poland) Aleksander Papiewski (September 1983–June 1984)
- (Poland) Henryk Apostel (10 October 1984 – 30 June 1988)
- (Poland) Alojzy Łysko (1988)
- (Poland) Tadeusz Pawłowski (6 October 1992 – 10 May 1993)
- (Poland) Stanisław Świerk (1993–95)
- (Poland) Wiesław Wojno (1 July 1996 – 11 March 1997)
- (Poland) Jerzy Kasalik (11 March 1997 – 21 September 1997)
- (Poland) (interim) Edward Żugaj (1998)
- (Poland) Aleksander Papiewski (1998)
- (Poland) Grzegorz Kowalski (1 July 1998 – 20 December 1998)
- (Poland) Wojciech Łazarek (21 December 1998 – 3 November 1999)
- (Poland) Władysław Łach (3 July 2000 – 10 April 2001)
- (Poland) Janusz Wójcik (10 April 2001 – 7 June 2001)
- (Poland) Marian Putyra (7 June 2001 – 24 August 2001)
- (Czech Republic) Petr Nemec (24 August 2001 – 25 March 2002)
- (Poland) Marian Putyra (25 March 2002 – 30 June 2003)
- (Poland) Grzegorz Kowalski (1 July 2003 – 30 September 2004)
- (Poland) Ryszard Tarasiewicz (29 September 2004 – 28 June 2006)
- (Czech Republic) Luboš Kubík (6 July 2006 – 2 October 2006)
- (Poland) Jan Żurek (2 October 2006 – 18 June 2007)
- (Poland) Ryszard Tarasiewicz (19 June 2007 – 22 September 2010)
- (Poland) Paweł Barylski (caretaker) (22 September 2010 – 27 September 2010)
- (Poland) Orest Lenczyk (27 September 2010 – 31 August 2012)
- (Poland) Paweł Barylski (caretaker) (31 August 2012 – 3 September 2012)
- (Czech Republic) Stanislav Levy (3 September 2012 – 23 February 2014)
- (Poland) Tadeusz Pawłowski (24 February 2014 – 6 December 2015)
- (Poland) Romuald Szukiełowicz (7 December 2015 – 9 March 2016)
- (Poland) Mariusz Rumak (9 March 2016 – 19 December 2016)
- (Poland) Jan Urban (5 January 2017 – 19 February 2018)
- (Poland) Tadeusz Pawłowski (19 February 2018 – 11 December 2018)
- (Poland) Paweł Barylski (caretaker) (11 December 2018 – 3 January 2019)
- (Czech Republic) Vítězslav Lavička (3 January 2019 – 21 March 2021)
- (Poland) Jacek Magiera (22 March 2021 – 8 March 2022)
- (Poland) Piotr Tworek (9 March 2022 – 1 June 2022)
- (Serbia) Ivan Đurđević (2 June 2022 – 21 April 2023)
- (Poland) Jacek Magiera (21 April 2023 – 12 November 2024)
- (Poland) Michał Hetel and (Poland) Marcin Dymkowski (caretaker) (12 November 2024 – 24 December 2024)
- (Slovenia) Ante Šimundža (24 December 2024 – 2 November 2026)
- (Croatia) Toni Golem (4 November 2026 – present)

== Śląsk Wrocław (women) ==
The Śląsk Wrocław's women's team was formed in 2020, taking the place of KŚ AZS Wrocław in the Ekstraliga.

== The fans ==
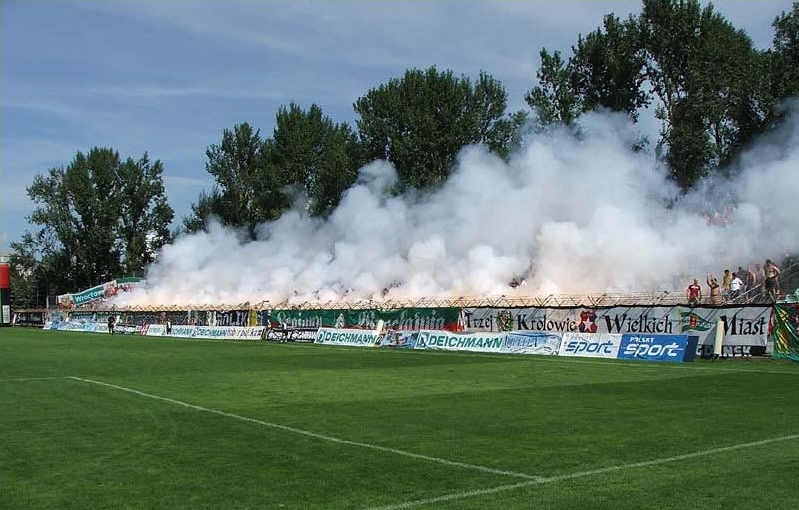
Śląsk fans 2003

Śląsk fans are one of the largest supporter movements in Poland. In the early 1970s, they were one of the pioneers of football supporters groups. The Śląsk supporters call themselves Nobles from Wrocław (Polish: Szlachta z Wrocławia). Notable Śląsk fans include: Waldemar Kasta, a rapper and ring announcer KSW, that also created fan songs for Śląsk, Hubert Hurkacz, a Polish tennis player.

=== Friendships ===
They have a friendship with Lechia Gdańsk with which the two clubs fans have had a friendship since 1977, and have had friendly relations since 1967. This is the oldest fan friendship in Polish football. During the 2017–18 season, the two sets of fans celebrated their 40th Friendship Anniversary. Games between the two are often called "the friendship match".

The fans have also had a friendship with Motor Lublin dating back to the 1990s. Due to the clubs' long friendship, Śląsk were invited to play a friendly in 2015 in Lublin to celebrate Motor's 65th anniversary.

Despite the clubs' close proximity, Śląsk also hold friendly relations with Miedź Legnica. The fans also have friendships with fans from both SFC Opava, from the Czech Republic, and Ferencvárosi TC, from Hungary.

=== Rivals ===
Their biggest rivals are Zagłębie Lubin, with the games between the two known as the "Lower Silesian Derby" (Polish: Derby Dolnego Śląska). The two teams are the largest in the Lower Silesia region, with Śląsk representing Wrocław (the capital of Lower Silesia) and Zagłębie representing Lubin, a traditionally industrial and copper mining city. Both teams have won the Ekstraklasa twice, Śląsk in 1977 & 2012, and Zagłębie in 1991 & 2007. They also hold a big rivalry with Legia Warsaw, due to both clubs having military roots. There also is a rivalry with Widzew Łódź, traditionally only due to competitive reasons, however, after the murder of a 17 year old Śląsk fan by a group of Widzew hooligans in Walichnowy, the rivalry became more heated than ever, and it still holds this status.

The fans of Lechia and Śląsk formally had a friendship with the Wisła Kraków fans, creating the "Three Kings of Great Cities" (Polish: Trzej Królowie Wielkich Miast) coalition. Wisła fans left the coalition in 2016. Since 2016 Wisła Kraków itself has since turned into a rivalry.

Arka Gdynia, Lech Poznań and Cracovia are rivals dating back to the time with their alliance with Wisła. This was due to the two largest fan coalitions in Poland, "Three Kings of Great Cities" (Śląsk, Lechia, Wisła) and "The Great Triad" (Lech, Arka, Cracovia) with any of the opposite coalition teams playing each other resulting in a big and hotly contested match.

== Logos ==
regular version

anniversary version

== See also ==
- List of Polish football champions
- Śląsk Wrocław II (reserve team)
- Śląsk Wrocław (basketball)
- Śląsk Wrocław (handball)
- Wrocław football riot 2003
