= Cisy Nałęczów =

Polish football and volleyball club

- Full name: Ludowy Klub Sportowy Cisy Nałęczów
- Founded: 1951; 74 years ago (as LKS Nałęczów)
- Capacity: 525
- Chairman: Piotr Garbacz
- Manager: Vacant (men's football)
- League: Regional league Lublin
- 2024–25: Regional league Lublin, 11th of 16
- Website: Tarasola Cisy Nałęczów on Facebook

Cisy Nałęczów is a Polish football and volleyball club from Nałęczów. The men's football team plays in the Regional league Lublin, under the name Tarasola Cisy Nałęczów for sponsorship reasons.

== History ==
The club is best known for its women's football team that played four seasons in Poland's highest tier, first the I liga, then known as the Ekstraliga. The women's section was founded in 2001 but came to an end in 2007 after the relegation from the Ekstraliga, after which the club's only interest are the men's teams.
