= Zagłębie Lubin =

- Full name: Zagłębie Lubin Spółka Akcyjna
- Nickname: Miedziowi (The Coppers)
- Founded: 10 September 1945; 81 years ago (as OMTUR Lubin)
- Ground: Zagłębie Lubin Stadium
- Capacity: 16,100
- Owner: KGHM Polska Miedź
- Chairman: vacant
- Manager: Leszek Ojrzyński
- League: Ekstraklasa
- 2025–26: Ekstraklasa, 7th of 18
- Website: www.zaglebie.com
Home colours	Away colours	Third colours

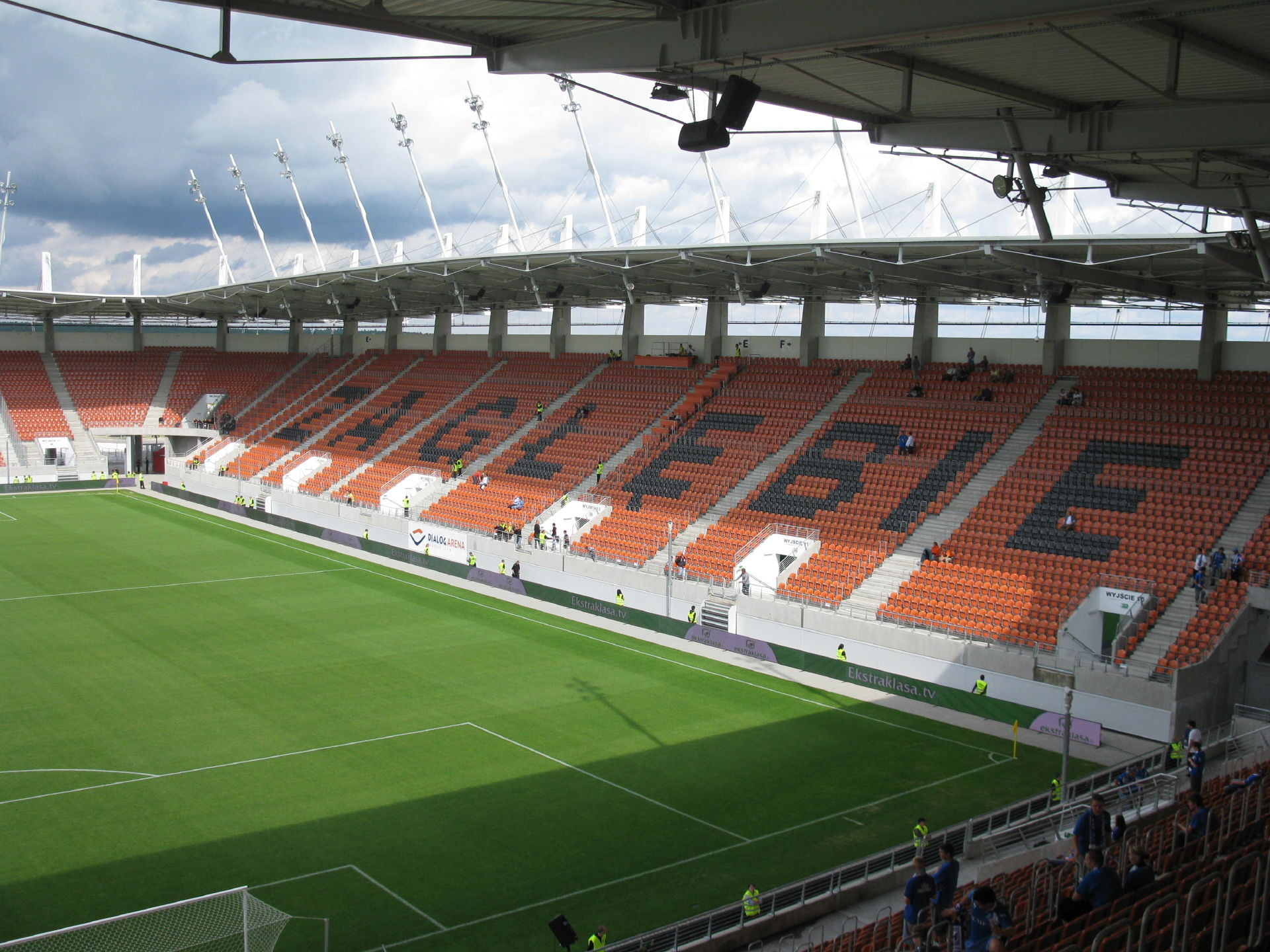
Zagłębie Lubin Stadium

Zagłębie Lubin S.A. (Polish pronunciation: [zaˈɡwɛmbjɛ ˈlubin]) is a Polish professional football club based in Lubin. Founded in 1945 as OMTUR Lubin, the club competes in the Ekstraklasa.

== History ==
The football team was founded in 1945 as OMTUR Lubin by local members of the Youth Organization of the Association of Workers’ Universities (Organizacja Młodzieży Towarzystwa Uniwersytetów Robotniczych, OMTUR). The team played matches on a pitch at Kościuszko Street. The games of OMTUR Lubin were very popular, attracting crowds of people. Among the opponents, was the team of the local Red Army garrison, which faced the Poles in the autumn of 1945.

In March 1946, Klub Sportowy Zawisza, based on OMTUR Lubin, was formed (the name comes after a medieval knight, Zawisza Czarny). Among its players was Emil Czyżowski of Pogoń Lwów, Tadeusz Rela of Tarnovia Tarnów, and Stanisław Leśniewski, who had briefly played for Dynamo Kyiv. In 1946, Zawisza played in the Group IV, winning promotion to the newly formed A-Klasa. On May 5, 1946 Zawisza Lubin played its first ever league game against MKS Zgorzelec. In 1947, Zawisza won the Cup of Lower Silesia, and in the same year, the team from Lubin faced the team of the Northern Group of Forces, headquartered in nearby Legnica. The game, which Poles won 1–0, was attended by Marshal Konstantin Rokossovsky.

In 1949, Zawisza Lubin changed name into Gwardia, and in 1951, to Spojnia. In 1953, the team returned to its original name, Zawisza.

In 1957, rich deposits of copper were discovered in the area of Lubin. With the construction of the Lubin mine, the team gained a rich sponsor (see also KGHM Polska Miedz). In 1961, its name was changed to Górnik ("Miner"). In 1963, Górnik won promotion from the C-Klasa to the B-Klasa. Finally, in 1966, its name was changed to MKS Zagłębie Lubin, with MKS standing for Międzyzakładowy Klub Sportowy (Inter-Enterprise Sports Club). In 1968, Zagłębie won promotion to the third division. In the 1970s Zagłębie had nine departments: football, volleyball, basketball, boxing, handball, track and field, weight lifting, table tennis and contract bridge. In 1974, Alojzy Sitko became the team's new manager. Zagłębie was a sensation in the 1975–76 Polish Cup, beating the reigning Polish champions Ruch Chorzów, however, they eventually lost to Górnik Zabrze.

In 1975, Zagłębie won a promotion to the second division, only to be relegated after one year. In 1978, it again was promoted and relegated after one year. The team was a sensation in the 1978–79 Polish Cup, beating GKS Katowice, Legia Warsaw and Górnik Zabrze, and reaching the semi-final, where they lost 0–3 to Wisła Kraków.

In 1982, under manager Stanisław Świerk, Zagłębie again won promotion to the second division. In 1985, it was finally promoted to the Ekstraklasa. With a new manager, Eugeniusz Rozanski, and a new stadium, Zagłębie was at that time one of the most powerful sports organization in Poland. On 27 July 1985, Zagłębie played its first Ekstraklasa home game, beating GKS Katowice 1–0, with Eugeniusz Ptak scoring the sole goal. In the 1985–86 season, Zagłębie finished 12th, in 1986–87 they placed 8th, and in 1987–88 - 11th. To avoid relegation, the team from Lubin had to participate in the play-offs, and lost to Górnik Wałbrzych (1–2, 2–2).

After one year in the second division, Zagłębie returned to the Ekstraklasa in June 1989. Managed by Stanisław Świerk, they were the 1989–90 Ekstraklasa runners-up and won a spot in the 1990–91 UEFA Cup. In the first round, Zagłębie faced the Italian side Bologna, losing both games 0–1, 0–1.

In June 1991, managed by Marian Putyra, Zagłębie won the Polish championship, earning a spot in the 1991–92 European Cup, where it faced Brøndby. The Polish champions lost 0–3 in the first leg, and won 2–1 at home, to be eliminated. Among Zagłębie’s top players at that time were Romuald Kujawa and Adam Zejer, both top scorers of the Ekstraklasa in 1990 and 1991.

In 1995 Zagłębie finished 4th, winning a spot in the 1995–96 UEFA Cup, where they lost to the European powerhouse, AC Milan (with Roberto Baggio, Paolo Maldini, Alessandro Costacurta, Roberto Donadoni, Marcel Desailly, Zvonimir Boban, and manager Fabio Capello).

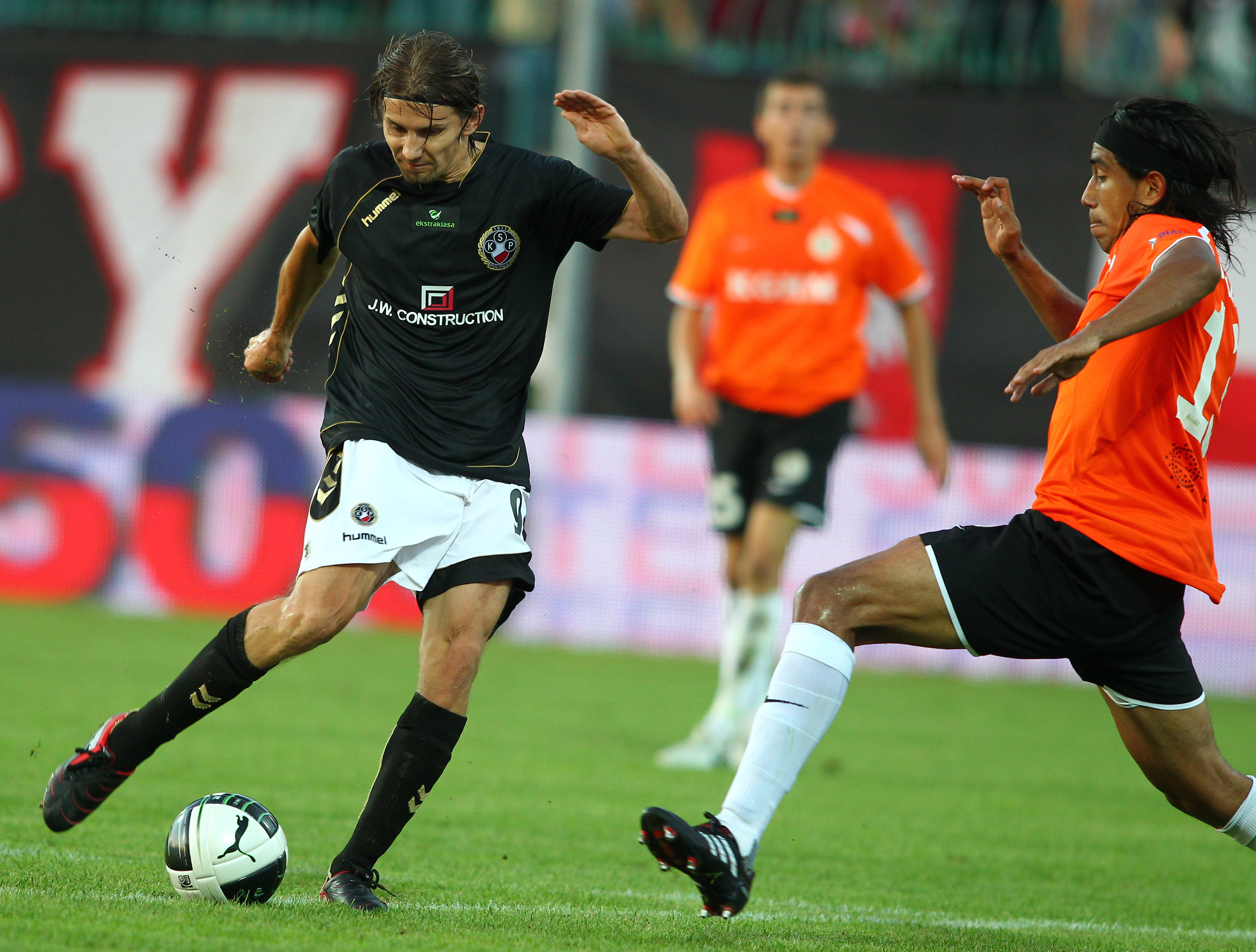
Away game with Polonia Warsaw played in the 2010–11 Ekstraklasa

In June 2003, after 13 years, Zagłębie was relegated from the Ekstraklasa. Before that, Zagłębie played 20 games in the Intertoto Cup, with 7 victories, 5 ties and 8 losses. Furthermore, in 2001, it was the fifth team in Poland, also reaching the semi-final of the Polish Cup.

After one year, Zagłębie returned to the Ekstraklasa in June 2004, and in spring 2005, it again reached the final of the Polish Cup, losing 0–2 to Dyskobolia Grodzisk Wielkopolski. In 2005–06, under Franciszek Smuda, Zagłębie, with its top scorer Michał Chałbiński, finished third in the league, winning a spot in the European competitions. Furthermore, the team again reached the final of the Polish Cup, losing 2–3 and 1–3 to Wisła Płock. In the UEFA Cup, Zagłębie was eliminated by Dinamo Minsk, following 1–1 and 0–0 draws, losing on away goals.

In the 2006–07 season, Zagłębie won the Polish championship for the second time, and at the beginning of the 2007–08 campaign they lifted the Polish Super Cup.

In the 2013–14 season, Zagłębie reached the Polish Cup final for the third time, this time losing 5–6 on penalties following a 0–0 draw after extra time to Zawisza Bydgoszcz. In the 2015–16 season, Zagłębie finished third in the Ekstraklasa, earning a spot in the 2016–17 UEFA Europa League qualifications, where they managed to defeat Bulgarian team Slavia Sofia and Serbian powerhouse Partizan, before being eliminated by Danish side SønderjyskE.

== Honours ==
=== League ===
- Ekstraklasa
  - Champions: 1990–91, 2006–07
  - Runners-up: 1989–90
  - Third place: 2005–06, 2015–16
- I liga
  - Champions: 1984–85, 1988–89, 2014–15
  - Runners-up: 2003–04, 2008–09
- II liga
  - Champions: 1974–75, 1977–78
  - Runners-up: 1979–80, 1981–82

=== Cup ===
- Polish Cup
  - Runners-up: 2004–05, 2005–06, 2013–14
  - Semi-finalists: 1978–79, 2000–01
- Polish Super Cup
  - Winners: 2007
  - Runners-up: 1991
- Polish League Cup:
  - Runners-up: 2000–01

=== Youth teams ===
- Młoda Ekstraklasa
  - Champions: 2009–10, 2010–11
  - Runners-up: 2011–12
- Polish U-19 championship:
  - Champions: 2009, 2010
  - Runners-up: 1990

== European record ==
Season	Competition	Round	Opponent	Home	Away	Aggregate
1990–91	UEFA Cup	1R	(Italy) Bologna	0–1	0–1	0–2
1991–92	European Cup	1R	(Denmark) Brøndby	2–1	0–3	2–4
1995–96	UEFA Cup	Q	(Armenia) Shirak	0–0	1–0	1–0
1995–96	UEFA Cup	1R	(Italy) AC Milan	0–4	1–4	1–8
1996	UEFA Intertoto Cup	GR	(Austria) SV Ried	2–1	—N/a	2nd
1996	UEFA Intertoto Cup	GR	(Denmark) Silkeborg	—N/a	0–0	2nd
1996	UEFA Intertoto Cup	GR	(Wales) Conwy United	3–0	—N/a	2nd
1996	UEFA Intertoto Cup	GR	(Belgium) Charleroi	—N/a	0–0	2nd
2000	UEFA Intertoto Cup	1R	(Azerbaijan) Vilash Masalli	4–0	3–1	7–1
2000	UEFA Intertoto Cup	2R	(Croatia) Slaven Belupo	1–1	0–0	1–1 (a)
2001	UEFA Intertoto Cup	1R	(Malta) Hibernians	4–0	0–1	4–1
2001	UEFA Intertoto Cup	2R	(Belgium) Lokeren	2–2	1–2	3–4
2002	UEFA Intertoto Cup	1R	(Latvia) Dinaburg	1–1	0–1	1–2
2006–07	UEFA Cup	1Q	(Belarus) Dinamo Minsk	1–1	0–0	1–1 (a)
2007–08	UEFA Champions League	2Q	(Romania) Steaua București	0–1	1–2	1–3
2016–17	UEFA Europa League	1Q	(Bulgaria) Slavia Sofia	3–0	0–1	3–1
2016–17	UEFA Europa League	2Q	(Serbia) Partizan	0–0	0–0	0–0 (4–3 p)
2016–17	UEFA Europa League	3Q	(Denmark) SønderjyskE	1–2	1–1	2–3

== Players ==
=== Current squad ===
As of 20 November 2026

Note: Flags indicate national team as defined under FIFA eligibility rules; some limited exceptions apply. Players may hold more than one non-FIFA nationality.

No.	Pos.	Nation	Player
1	GK	BIH	Jasmin Burić
3	DF	UKR	Roman Yakuba
4	DF	POL	Damian Michalski
5	DF	POL	Aleks Ławniczak
6	DF	CRO	David Čolina
7	MF	POL	Jakub Sypek
8	MF	POL	Damian Dąbrowski (captain)
9	FW	GRE	Michalis Kosidis
11	FW	POL	Arkadiusz Woźniak
13	DF	POL	Mateusz Grzybek
14	DF	POL	Sebastian Bonecki
16	DF	BIH	Josip Ćorluka
17	FW	HUN	Levente Szabó
18	FW	POL	Filip Szymczak
19	MF	POL	Szymon Łyczko
20	MF	POL	Mateusz Dziewiatowski
21	MF	POL	Seweryn Marek

No.	Pos.	Nation	Player
25	DF	POL	Michał Nalepa
26	MF	POL	Jakub Kolan
27	MF	POL	Patryk Dziekoński
30	GK	POL	Dominik Hładun
31	DF	POL	Igor Orlikowski
33	GK	SRB	Zlatan Alomerović
37	MF	GER	Sebastian Kerk
39	MF	POL	Filip Kocaba
44	MF	POL	Marcel Reguła
71	MF	POL	Kamil Nowogoński
77	FW	POL	Paweł Kosmalski
84	MF	POL	Jakub Ligocki
88	FW	CRO	Mihael Mlinarić
94	DF	POL	Maciej Urbański
95	GK	POL	Franciszek Nowak
99	MF	POL	Cyprian Popielec

=== Out on loan ===
Note: Flags indicate national team as defined under FIFA eligibility rules; some limited exceptions apply. Players may hold more than one non-FIFA nationality.

No.	Pos.	Nation	Player
2	DF	POL	Kamil Sochań (at Podbeskidzie Bielsko-Biała until 30 June 2027)
22	GK	POL	Adam Matysek (at Górnik Łęczna until 30 June 2027)
23	MF	POL	Patryk Kusztal (at Warta Poznań until 31 December 2026)

No.	Pos.	Nation	Player
34	GK	POL	Michał Matys (at Podbeskidzie Bielsko-Biała until 30 June 2027)
38	DF	POL	Szymon Karasiński (at ŁKS Łódź until 30 June 2027)

=== Retired numbers ===
Note: Flags indicate national team as defined under FIFA eligibility rules; some limited exceptions apply. Players may hold more than one non-FIFA nationality.

No.	Pos.	Nation	Player
10	MF	POL	Paweł Piotrowski (1996–2002 – posthumous honour)

=== Notable players ===
Had international caps for their respective countries at any time.

Poland

- (Poland) Adam Buksa
- (Poland) Piotr Czachowski
- (Poland) Damian Dąbrowski
- (Poland) Michał Goliński
- (Poland) Maciej Iwański
- (Poland) Jarosław Jach
- (Poland) Robert Kolendowicz
- (Poland) Mariusz Lewandowski
- (Poland) Wojciech Łobodziński
- (Poland) Dariusz Marciniak
- (Poland) Adam Matuszczyk
- (Poland) Szymon Pawłowski
- (Poland) Krzysztof Piątek
- (Poland) Kamil Piątkowski
- (Poland) Arkadiusz Piech
- (Poland) Rafał Pietrzak
- (Poland) Łukasz Piszczek
- (Poland) Łukasz Poręba
- (Poland) Marcel Reguła
- (Poland) Bartosz Slisz
- (Poland) Filip Starzyński
- (Poland) Jakub Świerczok
- (Poland) Arkadiusz Woźniak
- (Poland) Adam Zejer
- (Poland) Piotr Zieliński

Bosnia and Herzegovina

- (Bosnia and Herzegovina) Jasmin Burić
- (Bosnia and Herzegovina) Josip Ćorluka

Bulgaria

- (Bulgaria) Iliyan Mitsanski
- (Bulgaria) Aleksandar Tunchev
- (Bulgaria) Pavel Vidanov

Czech Republic

- (Czech Republic) Martin Doležal
- (Czech Republic) Michal Papadopulos

Georgia

- (Georgia (country)) Guram Giorbelidze

Greece

- (Greece) Sokratis Dioudis

Hungary

- (Hungary) Levente Szabó

Latvia

- (Latvia) Deniss Rakels

Lithuania

- (Lithuania) Deimantas Petravičius
- (Lithuania) Darvydas Šernas

Montenegro

- (Montenegro) Saša Balić
- (Montenegro) Aleksandar Šćekić

Serbia

- (Serbia) Bojan Isailović

Slovakia

- (Slovakia) Ľubomír Guldan
- (Slovakia) Csaba Horváth
- (Slovakia) Róbert Jež
- (Slovakia) Samuel Mráz
- (Slovakia) Martin Polaček
- (Slovakia) Miroslav Stoch

Slovenia

- (Slovenia) Damjan Bohar
- (Slovenia) Saša Živec

Ukraine

- (Ukraine) Serhiy Buletsa

Venezuela

- (Venezuela) Jhon Chancellor

Zimbabwe

- (Zimbabwe) Costa Nhamoinesu

== Coaching staff ==
As of 17 June 2025

Position	Staff
Manager	(Poland) Leszek Ojrzyński
Assistant coaches	(Poland) Jerzy Cyrak (Poland) Marcin Kardela (Poland) Patryk Kniat (Poland) Michał Macek
Goalkeeping coach	(Poland) Paweł Primel
Assistant goalkeeping coach	(Poland) Hubert Gajda
Fitness coaches	(Poland) Radosław Gwiazda (Poland) Rafał Mazur
Head physiotherapist	(Poland) Dariusz Puchalski
Physiotherapists	(Poland) Jakub Banasik (Poland) Jakub Nowak
Match analysts	(Poland) Dawid Dawidziak (Poland) Tomasz Ligudziński
Team manager	(Poland) Karol Sitarski
Sport psychologist	(Poland) Paweł Habrat
Head of equipment department	(Poland) Mariola Waszkowska
Team doctors	(Poland) Grzegorz Kozak (Poland) Jacek Worobiec
Cook	(Poland) Paweł Ryckiewicz

== Managers ==
- (Poland) Zdzisław Wolsza (1976)
- (Poland) Alojzy Łysko (1987–88)
- (Poland) Stanisław Świerk (1988–90)
- (Poland) Marian Putyra (25 October 1990 – 30 June 1992)
- (Poland) Jerzy Fiutowski (1993–94)
- (Poland) Mirosław Dragan (21 April 1994 – 25 October 1994)
- (Poland) Wiesław Wojno (26 October 1994 – 10 September 1995)
- (Poland) Andrzej Strejlau (24 October 1995 – 15 June 1996)
- (Poland) Mirosław Dragan (15 June 1996 – 28 October 1996)
- (Poland) Adam Topolski (29 October 1996 – 1 October 1997)
- (Poland) Andrzej Szarmach (1997–98)
- (Poland) Mirosław Jabłoński (1 July 1998 – 30 June 2001)
- (Poland) Stefan Majewski (28 June 2001 – 17 November 2001)
- (Poland) Jerzy Wyrobek (17 November 2001 – 18 June 2002)
- (Poland) Adam Nawalka (18 June 2002 – 6 October 2002)
- (Poland) Wiesław Wojno (7 October 2002 – 5 May 2003)
- (Poland) Adam Topolski (5 May 2003 – 29 July 2003)
- (Serbia) Žarko Olarević (July 2003 – 3 Dec)
- (Croatia) Dražen Besek (23 December 2003 – 6 September 2005)
- (Poland) Franciszek Smuda (6 September 2005 – 30 June 2006)
- (Poland) Marek Kusto (interim) (13 December 2005 – 18 December 2005)
- (Poland) Edward Klejndinst (1 July 2006 – 3 October 2006)
- (Poland) Czesław Michniewicz (3 October 2006 – 22 October 2007)
- (Poland) Rafał Ulatowski (22 October 2007 – 11 July 2008)
- (Poland) Dariusz Fornalak (11 July 2008 – 17 November 2008)
- (Poland) Robert Jończyk (17 November 2008 – 12 April 2009)
- (Poland) Orest Lenczyk (16 April 2009 – 30 June 2009)
- (Poland) Andrzej Lesiak (17 June 2009 – 27 August 2009)
- (Poland) Franciszek Smuda (28 August 2009 – 18 December 2009)
- (Poland) Marek Bajor (18 December 2009 – 7 March 2011)
- (Poland) Marcin Broniszewski (interim) ( 7–10 March 2011)
- (Poland) Jan Urban (10 March 2011 – 31 October 2011)
- (Czech Republic) Pavel Hapal (31 October 2011 – 30 July 2013)
- (Poland) Adam Buczek (interim) (30 July 2013 – 27 September 2013)
- (Poland) Orest Lenczyk (27 September 2013 – 12 May 2014)
- (Poland) Piotr Stokowiec (12 May 2014 – 28 November 2017)
- (Poland) Mariusz Lewandowski (28 November 2017 – 29 October 2018)
- (Netherlands) Ben van Dael (29 October 2018 – 31 August 2019)
- (Poland) Paweł Karmelita (interim) (31 August 2019 – 16 September 2019)
- (Slovakia) Martin Ševela (16 September 2019 – 1 July 2021)
- (Poland) Paweł Karmelita (interim) (1 July 2021 – 16 July 2021)
- (Poland) Dariusz Żuraw (16 July 2021 – 16 December 2021)
- (Poland) Paweł Karmelita (interim) (16 December 2021 – 21 December 2021)
- (Poland) Piotr Stokowiec (21 December 2021 – 8 November 2022)
- (Poland) Paweł Karmelita (interim) (8 November 2022 – 29 November 2022)
- (Poland) Waldemar Fornalik (29 November 2022 – 23 September 2024)
- (Poland) Marcin Włodarski (25 September 2024 – 10 March 2025)
- (Poland) Leszek Ojrzyński (13 March 2025 – present)

== See also ==
- Zagłębie Lubin II (reserve team)
- Football in Poland
