= Polar Wrocław =

Polish sports club

- Full name: Zakładowy Klub Sportowy Polar Wrocław
- Nickname: Polarowcy
- Founded: 1945; 80 years ago July 2024; 1 year ago (refounded)
- Ground: MCS Zakrzów Stadium
- Capacity: 300
- Chairman: Przemysław Kmiotek
- Manager: Marcin Hirsz
- League: Klasa B Wrocław IX
| Home colours | Away colours |

Zakładowy Klub Sportowy Polar Wrocław, known simply as Polar Wrocław, is a Polish sports club based in the Zakrzów district of Wrocław, named after the local electronics company "Polar". The women's field hockey team existed since 1967. The men's football team is currently competing in the amateur divisions. After being in the centre of a huge corruption scandal in 2004, the club was dissolved. On 11 March 2005, the club "MKS Polar Wrocław-Zawidawie" was founded which continued the club's traditions until its disestablishment in 2015. In 2024, Polar was re-activated under its historic name.

== Current squad ==
As of 8 April 2015 Note: Flags indicate national team as defined under FIFA eligibility rules; some limited exceptions apply. Players may hold more than one non-FIFA nationality.

| No. | Pos. | Nation | Player |
|---|---|---|---|
| — | GK | POL | Michał Poznański |
| — | GK | POL | Grzegorz Węglarski |
| — | DF | POL | Jakub Biernacki |
| — | DF | POL | Jakub Cięciwa |
| — | DF | POL | Rafał Fościak |
| — | DF | POL | Konrad Kamiński |
| — | DF | POL | Jarosław Węglowski |
| — | DF | POL | Jarosław Głodek |
| — | DF | POL | Krystian Kalicki |
| — | DF | POL | Andrzej Majewski |
| — | DF | POL | Rafał Mingin |
| — | DF | POL | Adrian Papierz |
| — | DF | POL | Bartosz Śliwiński |
| — | DF | POL | Paweł Zasiadczyk |
| — | DF | POL | Andrzej Skrzydło |
| — | DF | POL | Krzysztof Szkudlarek |
| — | DF | POL | Maciej Nędzi |
| — | MF | POL | Mateusz Witkowski |
| — | MF | POL | Chrystian Edelbauer |
| — | MF | UKR | Vladyslav Yantsov |

| No. | Pos. | Nation | Player |
|---|---|---|---|
| — | MF | POL | Mirosław Rokosz |
| — | MF | POL | Dominik Rek |
| — | MF | POL | Paweł Ostros |
| — | MF | POL | Andrzej Łomża |
| — | MF | POL | Damian Krysiak |
| — | MF | POL | Dawid Jakubowski |
| — | MF | POL | Michał Berkowicz |
| — | FW | POL | Piotr Szewc |
| — | FW | POL | Dawid Pukszta |
| — | FW | POL | Artur Mikuśkiewicz |
| — | FW | POL | Damian Jurkowski |
| — | FW | POL | Mateusz Kuc |
| — | FW | POL | Adrian Foksiński |
| — | FW | POL | Marcin Bieszczad |
| — | FW | POL | Dawid Godek |
| — | FW | POL | Piotr Pałaszewski |
| — | FW | POL | Piotr Świdurski |
| — | FW | POL | Marcin Soberka |
| — | FW | POL | Maciej Sanojca |

== Honours ==
- Polish Cup quarter-finalists: 2002–03
- 9th place in II liga: 1999–2000, 2001–02

== See also ==
- Football in Poland
- List of football teams
