= 1996–97 UEFA Cup =

26th season of Europe's secondary club football tournament organised by UEFA

- Dates: 17 July 1996 – 21 May 1997

Final positions
- Champions: (Germany) Schalke 04 (1st title)
- Runners-up: (Italy) Inter Milan

Tournament statistics
- Matches played: 126
- Goals scored: 327 (2.6 per match)
- Top scorer(s): Maurizio Ganz (Inter Milan); 8 goals

The 1996–97 UEFA Cup was the 26th season of the UEFA Cup, the third-tier club football competition organised by the Union of European Football Associations (UEFA). It was won by German side Schalke 04, who beat Inter Milan of Italy on penalties after the two-legged final finished 1–1 on aggregate. Defending champions Bayern Munich were eliminated in the first round by Valencia.

This was the last year in which the UEFA Cup final was played in a two-legged, home-and-away format. From 1998, the final was played as a single match at a neutral venue.

== Format ==
According to 1995 UEFA ranking, Bulgaria ceded a slot to Norway.

The access list was finally increased to 117 clubs:

- all the 47 federations obtained a UEFA place,
- all the 24 national champions excluded from the Champions League entered in the UEFA Cup,
- all the 8 national champions that failed to qualify for the Champions League group stage entered in the UEFA Cup First round
- a third winner of the UEFA Intertoto Cup was added,
- 3 clubs of the UEFA Fair Play ranking were confirmed.

A second qualifying round was consequently added for the first time in the history of the European competitions.

== Teams ==
The labels in the parentheses show how each team qualified for the place of its starting round:

- TH: Title holders
- LC: League Cup winners
- Nth: League position
- IC: Intertoto Cup
- FP: Fair play
- CLQ: Relegated from the Champions League

First round
(Italy) Lazio (3rd)	(Spain) Tenerife (5th)	(England) Newcastle United (2nd)	(Russia) Alania Vladikavkaz (CLQ)
(Italy) Roma (5th)	(Germany) Bayern Munich^{TH} (2nd)	(England) Aston Villa (LC)	(Denmark) Brøndby (CLQ)
(Italy) Parma (6th)	(Germany) Schalke 04 (3rd)	(England) Arsenal (5th)	(Czech Republic) Slavia Prague (CLQ)
(Italy) Inter Milan (7th)	(Germany) Borussia Mönchengladbach (4th)	(Belgium) Anderlecht (2nd)	(Ukraine) Dynamo Kyiv (CLQ)
(France) Monaco (3rd)	(Germany) Hamburg (5th)	(Belgium) Germinal Ekeren (3rd)	(Hungary) Ferencváros (CLQ)
(France) Metz (LC)	(Netherlands) Feyenoord (3rd)	(Belgium) Molenbeek (4th)	(Israel) Maccabi Tel Aviv (CLQ)
(France) Lens (5th)	(Netherlands) Roda (4th)	(Greece) Olympiacos (3rd)	(France) Guingamp (IC)
(France) Montpellier (6th)	(Portugal) Sporting CP (3rd)	(Belgium) Club Brugge (CLQ)	(Germany) Karlsruhe (IC)
(Spain) Valencia (2nd)	(Portugal) Boavista (4th)	(Greece) Panathinaikos (CLQ)	(Denmark) Silkeborg (IC)
(Spain) Espanyol (4th)	(Portugal) Vitória Guimarães (5th)		
Qualifying round
(Greece) Iraklis (4th)	(Denmark) Lyngby (4th)	(Switzerland) Aarau (4th)	(Ukraine) Chornomorets Odesa (2nd)
(Russia) Spartak Moscow (3rd)	(Austria) Tirol Innsbruck (3rd)	(Czech Republic) Sigma Olomouc (2nd)	(Hungary) BVSC (2nd)
(Russia) Dynamo Moscow (4th)	(Austria) GAK (4th)	(Scotland) Celtic (2nd)	(Romania) Național București (2nd)
(Russia) Torpedo Moscow (5th)	(Sweden) Helsingborg (2nd)	(Scotland) Aberdeen (3rd)	(Romania) Rapid București (3rd)
(Turkey) Trabzonspor (2nd)	(Sweden) Halmstad (3rd)	(Norway) Molde (2nd)	(Russia) CSKA Moscow (FP)
(Turkey) Beşiktaş (3rd)	(Switzerland) Neuchâtel Xamax (3rd)	(Norway) Bodø/Glimt (3rd)	(Sweden) Malmö (FP)
(Denmark) Odense (3rd)			
Preliminary round
(Poland) Legia Warsaw (2nd)	(Georgia (country)) Dinamo Tbilisi (1st)	(Moldova) Zimbru Chișinău (1st)	(Faroe Islands) B71 (4th)
(Poland) Hutnik Kraków (3rd)	(Georgia (country)) Margveti Zestaponi (2nd)	(Moldova) Tiligul Tiraspol (2nd)	(Wales) Barry Town (1st)
(Israel) Maccabi Haifa (2nd)	(Iceland) ÍA (1st)	(Republic of Ireland) St Patrick's Athletic (1st)	(Wales) Newtown (2nd)
(Israel) Beitar Jerusalem (3rd)	(Iceland) ÍBV (3rd)	(Republic of Ireland) Bohemians (2nd)	(Armenia) Pyunik (1st)
(Cyprus) APOEL (1st)	(Finland) Haka (1st)	(Malta) Sliema Wanderers (1st)	(Armenia) Shirak (2nd)
(Cyprus) Anorthosis Famagusta (2nd)	(Finland) HJK (3rd)	(Malta) Floriana (3rd)	(Estonia) Lantana Tallinn (1st)
Croatia Zagreb (1st)	(Bulgaria) Slavia Sofia (1st)	(Lithuania) Inkaras Kaunas (1st)	(Estonia) Flora (2nd)
(Croatia) Hajduk Split (2nd)	(Bulgaria) Lokomotiv Sofia (3rd)	(Lithuania) Žalgiris Vilnius (3rd)	(Federal Republic of Yugoslavia) Partizan (1st)
(Latvia) Skonto (1st)	(Belarus) Dinamo Minsk (1st)	(Albania) Tirana (1st)	(Federal Republic of Yugoslavia) Vojvodina (3rd)
(Latvia) Dinaburg (2nd)	(Belarus) Dinamo-93 Minsk (3rd)	(Albania) Teuta Durrës (2nd)	(Federal Republic of Yugoslavia) Bečej (4th)
(Slovakia) Slovan Bratislava (1st)	(Northern Ireland) Portadown (1st)	(Luxembourg) Jeunesse Esch (1st)	(Azerbaijan) Neftçi (1st)
(Slovakia) Košice (2nd)	(Northern Ireland) Crusaders (2nd)	(Luxembourg) Grevenmacher (2nd)	(Azerbaijan) Khazri Buzovna (2nd)
(Slovenia) Gorica (1st)	(North Macedonia) Sileks (1st)	(Faroe Islands) GÍ (1st)	(Finland) Jazz (FP)
(Slovenia) Mura (3rd)	(North Macedonia) Vardar (3rd)		

== Preliminary round ==
Team 1	Agg.	Team 2	1st leg	2nd leg
Dinamo Tbilisi (Georgia (country))	6–2	(Luxembourg) Grevenmacher	4–0	2–2
Dinamo-93 Minsk (Belarus)	4–2	(Moldova) Tiligul Tiraspol	3–1	1–1
Croatia Zagreb	10–2	(Albania) Tirana	4–0	6–2
Sliema Wanderers (Malta)	4–3	(Georgia (country)) Margveti Zestaponi	1–3	3–0
Jazz (Finland)	4–1	(Faroe Islands) GÍ	3–1	1–0
Gorica (Slovenia)	1–3	(North Macedonia) Vardar	0–1	1–2
Anorthosis Famagusta (Cyprus)	6–2	(Armenia) Shirak	4–0	2–2
Portadown (Northern Ireland)	1–5	(Federal Republic of Yugoslavia) Vojvodina	0–1	1–4
Pyunik (Armenia)	5–6	(Finland) HJK	3–1	2–5 (aet)
Lantana Tallinn (Estonia)	2–1	(Iceland) ÍBV	2–1	0–0
Bohemians (Republic of Ireland)	1–1 (a)	(Belarus) Dinamo Minsk	1–1	0–0
Beitar Jerusalem (Israel)	8–2	(Malta) Floriana	3–1	5–1
Jeunesse Esch (Luxembourg)	2–7	(Poland) Legia Warsaw	2–4	0–3
Slavia Sofia (Bulgaria)	5–4	(Lithuania) Inkaras Kaunas	4–3	1–1
ÍA (Iceland)	2–1	(North Macedonia) Sileks	2–0	0–1
Neftçi (Azerbaijan)	2–7	(Bulgaria) Lokomotiv Sofia	2–1	0–6
Newtown (Wales)	1–7	(Latvia) Skonto	1–4	0–3
Zimbru Chișinău (Moldova)	1–6	(Croatia) Hajduk Split	0–4	1–2
B71 (Faroe Islands)	3–9	(Cyprus) APOEL	1–5	2–4
Barry Town (Wales)	2–1	(Latvia) Dinaburg	0–0	2–1
Žalgiris Vilnius (Lithuania)	3–2	(Northern Ireland) Crusaders	2–0	1–2
Teuta Durrës (Albania)	2–6	(Slovakia) Košice	1–4	1–2
Haka (Finland)	3–2	(Estonia) Flora	2–2	1–0
Bečej (Federal Republic of Yugoslavia)	0–2	(Slovenia) Mura	0–0	0–2
Hutnik Kraków (Poland)	11–2	(Azerbaijan) Khazri Buzovna	9–0	2–2
Maccabi Haifa (Israel)	1–4	(Federal Republic of Yugoslavia) Partizan	0–1	1–3
St Patrick's Athletic (Republic of Ireland)	3–5	(Slovakia) Slovan Bratislava	3–4	0–1

=== First leg ===
17 July 1996
17:00

Dinamo Tbilisi (Georgia (country))	4–0	(Luxembourg) Grevenmacher
Iashvili 38', 69'; Gogichaishvili 75'; Demetradze 86'	Report

Boris Paichadze National Stadium, Tbilisi
Attendance: 13,800
Referee: Ünsal Çimen (Turkey)

17 July 1996
17:00

Dinamo-93 Minsk (Belarus)	3–1	(Moldova) Tiligul Tiraspol
Sinkovets 5', 10'; Arlowski 7'	Report	Cosse 87'

City Stadium, Maladzyechna
Attendance: 2,500
Referee: Sergei Anokhin (Russia)

17 July 1996
20:00

Croatia Zagreb	4–0	(Albania) Tirana
Slišković 25'; Krznar 42'; I. Cvitanović 53', 78' (pen.)	Report

Stadion Maksimir, Zagreb
Attendance: 6,694
Referee: Vasyl Melnychuk (Ukraine)

17 July 1996
20:00

Sliema Wanderers (Malta)	1–3	(Georgia (country)) Margveti Zestaponi
Turner 65' (pen.)	Report	Gongadze 24'; Endeladze 77'; Ukleba 86'

National Stadium, Ta' Qali
Attendance: 1,332
Referee: Mike Reed (England)

17 July 1996
17:30

Jazz (Finland)	3–1	(Faroe Islands) GÍ
Suikkanen 38'; Leivo-Jokimäki 49'; Piracaia 77'	Report	H. Heinason 89'

Porin stadion, Pori
Attendance: 3,196
Referee: Romāns Lajuks (Latvia)

17 July 1996
18:00

Gorica (Slovenia)	0–1	(North Macedonia) Vardar
	Report	Trajčev 43'

Športni park Nova Gorica, Nova Gorica
Attendance: 2,230
Referee: Loris Stafoggia (Italy)

17 July 1996
19:00

Anorthosis Famagusta (Cyprus)	4–0	(Armenia) Shirak
V. Mihajlović 51', 84'; Gogić 62' (pen.), 74' (pen.)	Report

Antonis Papadopoulos Stadium, Larnaca
Attendance: 4,546
Referee: Miroslav Liba (Czech Republic)

17 July 1996
21:00

Portadown (Northern Ireland)	0–1	(Federal Republic of Yugoslavia) Vojvodina
	Report	Cilinšek 27'

Shamrock Park, Portadown
Attendance: 1,171
Referee: Roy Helge Olsen (Norway)

17 July 1996
15:00

Pyunik (Armenia)	3–1	(Finland) HJK
A. Avetisyan 22', 52'; Mkhitaryan 73'	Report	Lehtinen 40' (pen.)

Hrazdan Stadium, Yerevan
Attendance: 4,500
Referee: Grujica Tomić (Croatia)

17 July 1996
17:00

Lantana Tallinn (Estonia)	2–1	(Iceland) ÍBV
Bragin 60'; Gruznov 80'	Report	Guðmundsson 57'

Kadriorg Stadium, Tallinn
Attendance: 500
Referee: Algirdas Dubinskas (Lithuania)

17 July 1996
21:00

Bohemians (Republic of Ireland)	1–1	(Belarus) Dinamo Minsk
Swan 1'	Report	U. Makowski 63'

Dalymount Park, Dublin
Attendance: 2,200
Referee: Víctor Esquinas Torres (Spain)

17 July 1996
17:30

Beitar Jerusalem (Israel)	3–1	(Malta) Floriana
Sallói 18'; Harazi 29'; Pisont 42'	Report	Stefanović 55'

Teddy Stadium, Jerusalem
Attendance: 7,020
Referee: Athanasios Zachariadis (Greece)

17 July 1996
19:00

Jeunesse Esch (Luxembourg)	2–4	(Poland) Legia Warsaw
Ganser 31'; Theis 43' (pen.)	Report	Pisz 3'; Sokołowski 38'; Staniek 40' (pen.), 60' (pen.)

Stade de la Frontière, Esch-sur-Alzette
Attendance: 1,580
Referee: Joaquim Bento Marques (Portugal)

17 July 1996
17:30

Slavia Sofia (Bulgaria)	4–3	(Lithuania) Inkaras Kaunas
Panayotov 31', 70'; Totev 41'; Pramatarov 84'	Report	Poderis 8'; Maciulevičius 16', 74'

Slavia Stadion, Sofia
Attendance: 4,000
Referee: John Rowbotham (Scotland)

17 July 1996
22:00

ÍA (Iceland)	2–0	(North Macedonia) Sileks
Guðjónsson 44'; Biberčić 72'	Report

Akranesvöllur, Akranes
Attendance: 800
Referee: Joseph Byrne (Republic of Ireland)

17 July 1996
15:30

Neftçi (Azerbaijan)	2–1	(Bulgaria) Lokomotiv Sofia
Rzayev 54'; Vahabzade 88'	Report	Borisov 8'

Tofiq Bahramov Republican Stadium, Baku
Attendance: 20,000
Referee: Roelof Luinge (Netherlands)

17 July 1996
20:00

Newtown (Wales)	1–4	(Latvia) Skonto
Brown 89'	Report	Astafjevs 37', 71'; Lobaņovs 77', 81'

Latham Park, Newtown
Attendance: 2,012
Referee: Juan Brito Arceo (Spain)

17 July 1996
18:00

Zimbru Chișinău (Moldova)	0–4	(Croatia) Hajduk Split
	Report	Skoko 15', 55', 70'; Vučko 28'

Stadionul Republican, Chişinău
Attendance: 6,000
Referee: Graziano Cesari (Italy)

17 July 1996
20:00

B71 (Faroe Islands)	1–5	(Cyprus) APOEL
Hentze 33' (pen.)	Report	Sotiriou 6', 26'; Fasouliotis 12'; Alexandrou 35', 69'

Svangaskarð, Toftir
Attendance: 297
Referee: Georg Dardenne (Germany)

17 July 1996
17:30

Žalgiris Vilnius (Lithuania)	2–0	(Northern Ireland) Crusaders
Vencevičius 82'; Pukelevičius 84'	Report

Žalgiris Stadium, Vilnius
Attendance: 1,500
Referee: Roger Philippi (Luxembourg)

17 July 1996
17:30

Teuta Durrës (Albania)	1–4	(Slovakia) Košice
Begeja 2'	Report	Sovič 45', 66'; Obšitník 85'; Kožlej 87'

Selman Stërmasi Stadium, Tirana
Attendance: 3,500
Referee: John Ferry (Northern Ireland)

17 July 1996
17:30

Haka (Finland)	2–2	(Estonia) Flora
Ristilä 56', 81'	Report	M. Rooba 22'; Zdančius 90'

Tehtaan kenttä, Valkeakoski
Attendance: 1,645
Referee: Jacek Granat (Poland)

17 July 1996
17:30

Bečej (Federal Republic of Yugoslavia)	0–0	(Slovenia) Mura
	Report

Stadion Karađorđe, Novi Sad
Attendance: 2,000
Referee: Dimitar Momirov (Bulgaria)

17 July 1996
17:00

Hutnik Kraków (Poland)	9–0	(Azerbaijan) Khazri Buzovna
Yahaya 29'; Romuzga 38', 66'; Wojnecki 64', 73'; Zając 68', 70'; Shipovskiy 85' (pen.); Jamróz 90'	Report

Stadion Suche Stawy, Kraków
Attendance: 2,500
Referee: Morgan Norman (Sweden)

17 July 1996
16:30

Maccabi Haifa (Israel)	0–1	(Federal Republic of Yugoslavia) Partizan
	Report	Svetličić 8'

Kiryat Eliezer Stadium, Haifa
Attendance: 6,460
Referee: Sergei Khusainov (Russia)

18 July 1996
20:30

Barry Town (Wales)	0–0	(Latvia) Dinaburg
	Report

Jenner Park, Barry
Attendance: 2,500
Referee: José Pratas (Portugal)

18 July 1996
20:45

St Patrick's Athletic (Republic of Ireland)	3–4	(Slovakia) Slovan Bratislava
Glynn 44'; O'Flaherty 64'; McDonnell 73'	Report	Németh 11', 40'; Maixner 19'; Karasy 78'

Richmond Park, Dublin
Attendance: 2,464
Referee: Timo Keltanen (Finland)

=== Second leg ===
23 July 1996
19:30

Grevenmacher (Luxembourg)	2–2	(Georgia (country)) Dinamo Tbilisi
Scholten 37'; Lauer 55'	Report	Kiknadze 49'; Kerdzevadze 68'

Op Flohr Stadion, Grevenmacher
Attendance: 450
Referee: Ante Kulušić (Croatia)

Dinamo Tbilisi won 6–2 on aggregate.

23 July 1996
17:00

Dinaburg (Latvia)	1–2	(Wales) Barry Town
Tarasovs 61'	Report	Pike 37'; C. Evans 86'

Celtnieks Stadium, Daugavpils
Attendance: 1,100
Referee: Stuart Dougal (Scotland)

Barry Town won 2–1 on aggregate.

24 July 1996
17:00

Tiligul Tiraspol (Moldova)	1–1	(Belarus) Dinamo-93 Minsk
Pogorelov 50'	Report	Labanaw 10'

Stadionul Municipal, Tiraspol
Attendance: 5,100
Referee: Srečko Kandare (Slovenia)

Dinamo-93 Minsk won 4–2 on aggregate.

24 July 1996
17:30

Tirana (Albania)	2–6	Croatia Zagreb
Fortuzi 25'; Gallo 29'	Report	I. Cvitanović 1'; D. Šimić 35'; Marić 39'; Gašpar 55'; Rukavina 60'; Šarić 81'

Selman Stërmasi Stadium, Tirana
Attendance: 3,500
Referee: José Núñez Manrique (Spain)

Croatia Zagreb won 10–2 on aggregate.

24 July 1996
15:45

Margveti Zestaponi (Georgia (country))	0–3	(Malta) Sliema Wanderers
	Report	Mallia 13'; Muscat 49'; Turner 89' (pen.)

Central Stadium, Zestaponi
Attendance: 2,482
Referee: Lutz Michael Fröhlich (Germany)

Sliema Wanderers won 4–3 on aggregate.

24 July 1996
20:00

GÍ (Faroe Islands)	0–1	(Finland) Jazz
	Report	Luiz Antônio 86'

Svangaskarð, Toftir
Attendance: 1,000
Referee: Eric Romain (Belgium)

Jazz won 4–1 on aggregate.

24 July 1996
20:00

Vardar (North Macedonia)	2–1	(Slovenia) Gorica
Trajčev 3'; Jakimovski 77'	Report	Demirović 42'

Stadion Gradski Park, Skopje
Attendance: 6,300
Referee: Kostadin Gerginov (Bulgaria)

Vardar won 3–1 on aggregate.

24 July 1996
16:00

Shirak (Armenia)	2–2	(Cyprus) Anorthosis Famagusta
Harutyunyan 16'; Ioannou 52' (o.g.)	Report	Gogić 18' (pen.); A. Mihajlović 46'

Hrazdan Stadium, Yerevan
Attendance: 4,350
Referee: Henadz Yakubowski (Belarus)

Anorthosis Famagusta won 6–2 on aggregate.

24 July 1996
17:30

Vojvodina (Federal Republic of Yugoslavia)	4–1	(Northern Ireland) Portadown
Lerinc 9'; Stojak 15'; Miloševski 59'; Cilinšek 85'	Report	Casey 79'

Gradski Stadion, Novi Sad
Attendance: 1,781
Referee: Kostas Kapitanis (Cyprus)

Vojvodina won 5–1 on aggregate.

24 July 1996
17:30

HJK (Finland)	5–2 (a.e.t.)	(Armenia) Pyunik
Vasara 32'; Lehtola 52'; Lehtinen 86'; Aniche 97'; Hyryläinen 109'	Report	Sanamyan 41'; A. Avetisyan 103'

Helsingin Olympiastadion, Helsinki
Attendance: 800
Referee: Knud Erik Fisker (Denmark)

HJK won 6–5 on aggregate.

24 July 1996
20:00

ÍBV (Iceland)	0–0	(Estonia) Lantana Tallinn
	Report

Hásteinsvöllur, Vestmannaeyjar
Attendance: 850
Referee: Ceri Richards (Wales)

Lantana Tallinn won 2–1 on aggregate.

24 July 1996
17:00

Dinamo Minsk (Belarus)	0–0	(Republic of Ireland) Bohemians
	Report

City Stadium, Molodechno
Attendance: 1,500
Referee: Gheorghe Constantin (Romania)

1–1 on aggregate. Dinamo Minsk won on away goals.

24 July 1996
18:00

Floriana (Malta)	1–5	(Israel) Beitar Jerusalem
M. Galea 80'	Report	Amsalem 19'; Ohana 21'; Harazi 40'; Sallói 72'; Abukasis 81'

National Stadium, Ta' Qali
Attendance: 610
Referee: Vladimír Hriňák (Slovakia)

Beitar Jerusalem won 8–2 on aggregate.

24 July 1996
19:00

Legia Warsaw (Poland)	3–0	(Luxembourg) Jeunesse Esch
Mięciel 20', 63'; Oreshchuk 71'	Report

Polish Army Stadium, Warsaw
Attendance: 2,841
Referee: Kazimir Znaydinski (Belarus)

Legia Warsaw won 7–2 on aggregate.

24 July 1996
17:30

Inkaras Kaunas (Lithuania)	1–1	(Bulgaria) Slavia Sofia
Maciulevičius 14' (pen.)	Report	Ivanov 84'

Inkaras Stadium, Kaunas
Attendance: 6,000
Referee: Alan Howells (Wales)

Slavia Sofia won 5–4 on aggregate.

24 July 1996
17:00

Sileks (North Macedonia)	1–0	(Iceland) ÍA
Karanfilovski 41' (pen.)	Report

Gradski Stadion Kratovo, Kratovo
Attendance: 3,000
Referee: Kurt Zuppinger (Switzerland)

ÍA won 2–1 on aggregate.

24 July 1996
18:30

Lokomotiv Sofia (Bulgaria)	6–0	(Azerbaijan) Neftçi
Pavlov 17', 28'; Mechev 31'; Radivojević 51'; Marinov 71'; Gerov 89'	Report

Stadion Lokomotiv, Sofia
Attendance: 6,180
Referee: Marnix Sandra (Belgium)

Lokomotiv Sofia won 7–2 on aggregate.

24 July 1996
17:30

Skonto (Latvia)	3–0	(Wales) Newtown
Astafjevs 44'; Ivanov 71'; Jeļisejevs 80'	Report

Daugava Stadium, Liepāja
Attendance: 2,500
Referee: Mirosław Milewski (Poland)

Skonto won 7–1 on aggregate.

24 July 1996
20:00

Hajduk Split (Croatia)	2–1	(Moldova) Zimbru Chișinău
Skoko 66'; Butorović 83'	Report	Miterev 70'

Stadion Poljud, Split
Attendance: 8,250
Referee: Veselin Bogdanov (Bulgaria)

Hajduk Split won 6–1 on aggregate.

24 July 1996
19:00

APOEL (Cyprus)	4–2	(Faroe Islands) B71
Ioannou 13', 49'; Sotiriou 64'; Kozma 74' (pen.)	Report	Hentze 38' (pen.) á Reynatúgvu 43'

Makario Stadium, Nicosia
Attendance: 3,200
Referee: David Elleray (England)

APOEL won 9–3 on aggregate.

24 July 1996
20:30

Crusaders (Northern Ireland)	2–1	(Lithuania) Žalgiris Vilnius
Morgan 87', 90'	Report	Ražanauskas 17'

Seaview, Belfast
Attendance: 850
Referee: Claude Colombo (France)

Žalgiris Vilnius won 3–2 on aggregate.

24 July 1996
17:00

Košice (Slovakia)	2–1	(Albania) Teuta Durrës
Rusnák 56', 64'	Report	Dobi 54'

Všešportový areál, Košice
Attendance: 2,762
Referee: John McDermott (Republic of Ireland)

Košice won 6–2 on aggregate.

24 July 1996
17:00

Flora (Estonia)	0–1	(Finland) Haka
	Report	Popovich 15'

Kadriorg Stadium, Tallinn
Attendance: 980
Referee: Christer Fällström (Sweden)

Haka won 3–2 on aggregate.

24 July 1996
17:30

Mura (Slovenia)	2–0	(Federal Republic of Yugoslavia) Bečej
Škaper 15', 48'	Report

Mestni stadion Fazanerija, Murska Sobota
Attendance: 3,700
Referee: Karl Finzinger (Austria)

Mura won 2–0 on aggregate.

24 July 1996
15:00

Khazri Buzovna (Azerbaijan)	2–2	(Poland) Hutnik Kraków
Talıbov 17'; Aliyev 40'	Report	Ziółkowski 22'; Yahaya 84'

Tofiq Bahramov Republican Stadium, Baku
Attendance: 500
Referee: Gary Willard (England)

Hutnik Kraków won 11–2 on aggregate.

24 July 1996
19:00

Partizan (Federal Republic of Yugoslavia)	3–1	(Israel) Maccabi Haifa
Trenevski 34' (pen.); Saveljić 52'; Hristov 83'	Report	Revivo 9'

Stadion Partizan, Belgrade
Attendance: 6,000
Referee: Zbigniew Przesmycki (Poland)

Partizan won 4–1 on aggregate.

24 July 1996
19:00

Slovan Bratislava (Slovakia)	1–0	(Republic of Ireland) St Patrick's Athletic
Tittel 82'	Report

Tehelné pole, Bratislava
Attendance: 4,237
Referee: Vladimir Antonov (Moldova)

Slovan Bratislava won 5–3 on aggregate.

== Qualifying round ==
Team 1	Agg.	Team 2	1st leg	2nd leg
Dynamo Moscow (Russia)	4–2	(Finland) Jazz	1–1	3–1
Rapid București (Romania)	2–0	(Bulgaria) Lokomotiv Sofia	1–0	1–0
Anorthosis Famagusta (Cyprus)	1–6	(Switzerland) Neuchâtel Xamax	1–2	0–4
Halmstad (Sweden)	1–0	(North Macedonia) Vardar	0–0	1–0
GAK (Austria)	7–1	(Federal Republic of Yugoslavia) Vojvodina	2–0	5–1
Legia Warsaw (Poland)	4–1	(Finland) Haka	3–0	1–1
Iraklis (Greece)	1–3	(Cyprus) APOEL	0–1	1–2
Helsingborg (Sweden)	4–1	(Belarus) Dinamo-93 Minsk	1–1	3–0
ÍA (Iceland)	1–6	(Russia) CSKA Moscow	0–2	1–4
Sliema Wanderers (Malta)	1–9	(Denmark) Odense	0–2	1–7
Žalgiris Vilnius (Lithuania)	4–5	(Scotland) Aberdeen	1–4	3–1
BVSC (Hungary)	4–4 (2–4 p)	(Wales) Barry Town	3–1	1–3 (aet)
Sigma Olomouc (Czech Republic)	2–3	(Poland) Hutnik Kraków	1–0	1–3
Slovan Bratislava (Slovakia)	3–5	(Turkey) Trabzonspor	2–1	1–4
Partizan (Federal Republic of Yugoslavia)	0–1	(Romania) Național București	0–0	0–1
Aarau (Switzerland)	4–2	(Estonia) Lantana Tallinn	4–0	0–2
Croatia Zagreb	3–3 (a)	(Russia) Spartak Moscow	3–1	0–2
Slavia Sofia (Bulgaria)	2–5	(Austria) Tirol Innsbruck	1–1	1–4
Hajduk Split (Croatia)	1–2	(Russia) Torpedo Moscow	1–0	0–2
Beitar Jerusalem (Israel)	2–7	(Norway) Bodø/Glimt	1–5	1–2
Lyngby (Denmark)	2–0	(Slovenia) Mura	0–0	2–0
Košice (Slovakia)	0–1	(Scotland) Celtic	0–0	0–1
HJK (Finland)	2–4	(Ukraine) Chornomorets Odesa	2–2	0–2
Dinamo Tbilisi (Georgia (country))	2–1	(Norway) Molde	2–1	0–0
Skonto (Latvia)	1–4	(Sweden) Malmö FF	0–3	1–1
Dinamo Minsk (Belarus)	2–3	(Turkey) Beşiktaş	2–1	0–2

=== First leg ===
6 August 1996
17:30

Dynamo Moscow (Russia)	1–1	(Finland) Jazz
Kobelev 14'	Report	Laaksonen 37'

Central Dynamo Stadium, Moscow
Attendance: 2,500
Referee: Zbigniew Przesmycki (Poland)

6 August 1996
17:00

Rapid București (Romania)	1–0	(Bulgaria) Lokomotiv Sofia
Mironaș 75'	Report

Stadionul Giulești, Bucharest
Attendance: 8,750
Referee: René Temmink (Netherlands)

6 August 1996
19:00

Anorthosis Famagusta (Cyprus)	1–2	(Switzerland) Neuchâtel Xamax
Stavrou 18'	Report	Vernier 29'; Leśniak 54'

Antonis Papadopoulos Stadium, Larnaca
Attendance: 9,400
Referee: Alan Howells (Wales)

6 August 1996
18:30

Halmstad (Sweden)	0–0	(North Macedonia) Vardar
	Report

Örjans vall, Halmstad
Attendance: 2,479
Referee: Vasyl Melnychuk (Ukraine)

6 August 1996
20:30

GAK (Austria)	2–0	(Federal Republic of Yugoslavia) Vojvodina
Vuković 45'; Mužek 55'	Report

Alpenstadion, Kapfenberg
Attendance: 2,500
Referee: István Vad (Hungary)

6 August 1996
19:00

Legia Warsaw (Poland)	3–0	(Finland) Haka
Mosór 9'; Staniek 27'; Oreshchuk 87'	Report

Polish Army Stadium, Warsaw
Attendance: 3,225
Referee: Pavlín Jirků (Czech Republic)

6 August 1996
20:00

Iraklis (Greece)	0–1	(Cyprus) APOEL
	Report	Sotiriou 73'

Kaftanzoglio Stadium, Thessaloniki
Attendance: 6,486
Referee: Claude Colombo (France)

6 August 1996
19:00

Helsingborg (Sweden)	1–1	(Belarus) Dinamo-93 Minsk
Pringle 45'	Report	Arlowski 48'

Olympia, Helsingborg
Attendance: 6,007
Referee: Patrick Dempsey (Republic of Ireland)

6 August 1996
21:00

ÍA (Iceland)	0–2	(Russia) CSKA Moscow
	Report	Karsakov 34'; Jankauskas 37'

Akranesvöllur, Akranes
Attendance: 1,100
Referee: Finn Lambek (Denmark)

6 August 1996
20:00

Sliema Wanderers (Malta)	0–2	(Denmark) Odense
	Report	Schjønberg 80'; P. Pedersen 90'

National Stadium, Ta' Qali
Attendance: 921
Referee: Luc Huyghe (Belgium)

6 August 1996
17:30

Žalgiris Vilnius (Lithuania)	1–4	(Scotland) Aberdeen
Ražanauskas 49'	Report	Dodds 44', 81' (pen.); Glass 70'; Shearer 90'

Žalgiris Stadium, Vilnius
Attendance: 2,000
Referee: Ladislav Gádoši (Slovakia)

6 August 1996
19:30

BVSC (Hungary)	3–1	(Wales) Barry Town
Bükszegi 5'; Egressy 41'; Farkas 67' (pen.)	Report	T. Evans 14'

Szőnyi úti Stadion, Budapest
Attendance: 1,145
Referee: António Marçal (Portugal)

6 August 1996
17:00

Sigma Olomouc (Czech Republic)	1–0	(Poland) Hutnik Kraków
Baranek 78'	Report

Andrův stadion, Olomouc
Referee: Víctor Esquinas Torres (Spain)

6 August 1996
20:30

Slovan Bratislava (Slovakia)	2–1	(Turkey) Trabzonspor
Slovák 24'; Kinder 64'	Report	S. Arveladze 3'

Tehelné pole, Bratislava
Attendance: 7,836
Referee: Dick Jol (Netherlands)

6 August 1996
18:30

Partizan (Federal Republic of Yugoslavia)	0–0	(Romania) Național București
	Report

Partizan Stadium, Belgrade
Attendance: 15,000
Referee: Fernand Meese (Belgium)

6 August 1996
20:00

Aarau (Switzerland)	4–0	(Estonia) Lantana Tallinn
Georgiev 21'; Skrzypczak 55'; Pavličević 76', 86' (pen.)	Report

Stadion Brügglifeld, Aarau
Attendance: 3,500
Referee: Mateo Beusan (Croatia)

6 August 1996
20:00

Croatia Zagreb	3–1	(Russia) Spartak Moscow
Slišković 6'; I. Cvitanović 71' (pen.); Šarić 79'	Report	Galič 44' (o.g.)

Stadion Maksimir, Zagreb
Attendance: 15,000
Referee: Dimitar Momirov (Bulgaria)

6 August 1996
17:00

Slavia Sofia (Bulgaria)	1–1	(Austria) Tirol Innsbruck
Tosev 76'	Report	Kitzbichler 34'

Slavia Stadion, Sofia
Attendance: 3,000
Referee: Giorgos Bikas (Greece)

6 August 1996
20:00

Hajduk Split (Croatia)	1–0	(Russia) Torpedo Moscow
Leonchenko 50' (o.g.)	Report

Stadion Poljud, Split
Attendance: 20,000
Referee: Gheorghe Constantin (Romania)

6 August 1996
17:00

Beitar Jerusalem (Israel)	1–5	(Norway) Bodø/Glimt
Tretyak 46'	Report	R. Berg 23', 51', 56'; Johansen 37'; Sørensen 75'

Teddy Stadium, Jerusalem
Attendance: 9,000
Referee: Adrian Stoica (Romania)

6 August 1996
19:00

Lyngby (Denmark)	0–0	(Slovenia) Mura
	Report

Lyngby Stadion, Kongens Lyngby
Attendance: 842
Referee: Gary Willard (England)

6 August 1996
17:00

Košice (Slovakia)	0–0	(Scotland) Celtic
	Report

Všešportový areál, Košice
Attendance: 16,000
Referee: Konrad Plautz (Austria)

6 August 1996
17:30

HJK (Finland)	2–2	(Ukraine) Chornomorets Odesa
Lehkosuo 57'; Lehtinen 64'	Report	Mizin 35'; Musolitin 43'

Helsingin Olympiastadion, Helsinki
Attendance: 2,000
Referee: John McDermott (Republic of Ireland)

6 August 1996
17:00

Dinamo Tbilisi (Georgia (country))	2–1	(Norway) Molde
Gogichaishvili 13'; Iashvili 18'	Report	O. Stavrum 67'

Boris Paichadze National Stadium, Tbilisi
Attendance: 6,150
Referee: Stuart Dougal (Scotland)

6 August 1996
17:30

Skonto (Latvia)	0–3	(Sweden) Malmö FF
	Report	A. Andersson 34'; Kindvall 59'; Ohlsson 78'

Daugava Stadium, Liepāja
Attendance: 6,000
Referee: Kenny Clark (Scotland)

6 August 1996
18:15

Dinamo Minsk (Belarus)	2–1	(Turkey) Beşiktaş
M. Makowski 47'; U. Makowski 62'	Report	Serdar 60'

City Stadium, Molodechno
Attendance: 4,000
Referee: Andreas Schluchter (Switzerland)

=== Second leg ===
20 August 1996
16:30

Jazz (Finland)	1–3	(Russia) Dynamo Moscow
Leivo-Jokimäki 39'	Report	Kobelev 59' (pen.); Artyomov 67', 80'

Porin stadion, Pori
Attendance: 9,500
Referee: Roy Helge Olsen (Norway)

Dynamo Moscow won 4–2 on aggregate.

20 August 1996
18:00

Lokomotiv Sofia (Bulgaria)	0–1	(Romania) Rapid București
	Report	Butoiu 90'

Stadion Lokomotiv, Sofia
Attendance: 3,000
Referee: Gilles Veissière (France)

Rapid București won 2–0 on aggregate.

20 August 1996
20:00

Neuchâtel Xamax (Switzerland)	4–0	(Cyprus) Anorthosis Famagusta
Sandjak 9', 26'; Cyprien 17'; Vernier 36'	Report

Stade de la Maladière, Neuchâtel
Attendance: 12,074
Referee: Haim Lipkovitz (Israel)

Neuchâtel Xamax won 6–1 on aggregate.

20 August 1996
18:00

Vardar (North Macedonia)	0–1	(Sweden) Halmstad
	Report	Nilsson 50'

Stadion Gradski Park, Skopje
Attendance: 10,000
Referee: Alfred Micallef (Malta)

Halmstad won 1–0 on aggregate.

20 August 1996
19:30

Vojvodina (Federal Republic of Yugoslavia)	1–5	(Austria) GAK
Stojak 50'	Report	Ramusch 45' (pen.); Sabitzer 46', 72' (pen.); Wieger 52'; Aničić 86'

Gradski Stadion, Novi Sad
Attendance: 7,000
Referee: Livio Bazzoli (Italy)

GAK won 7–1 on aggregate.

20 August 1996
16:00

Haka (Finland)	1–1	(Poland) Legia Warsaw
Popovich 61'	Report	Mięciel 5'

Tehtaan kenttä, Valkeakoski
Attendance: 2,100
Referee: Syarhey Shmolik (Belarus)

Legia Warsaw won 4–1 on aggregate.

20 August 1996
19:30

APOEL (Cyprus)	2–1	(Greece) Iraklis
Alexandrou 5'; Sotiriou 86'	Report	Borbokis 90'

Makario Stadium, Nicosia
Attendance: 9,538
Referee: Bujar Pregja (Albania)

APOEL won 3–1 on aggregate.

20 August 1996
18:30

Dinamo-93 Minsk (Belarus)	0–3	(Sweden) Helsingborg
	Report	R. Nilsson 24' (pen.); Powell 32'; Pringle 79'

City Stadium, Maladzyechna
Attendance: 11,000
Referee: Zygmunt Ziober (Poland)

Helsingborg won 4–1 on aggregate.

20 August 1996
12:00

CSKA Moscow (Russia)	4–1	(Iceland) ÍA
Movsisyan 33', 40'; Leonidas 50'; Jankauskas 60'	Report	Högnason 80'

Central Dynamo Stadium, Moscow
Attendance: 3,000
Referee: Vančo Kocev (Macedonia)

CSKA Moscow won 6–1 on aggregate.

6 August 1996
20:00

Odense (Denmark)	7–1	(Malta) Sliema Wanderers
Schjønberg 21' (pen.), 60', 82'; K. Jensen 23'; Bisgaard 32', 45'; Henriksen 58'	Report	Teplovs 39' (pen.)

Odense Stadion, Odense
Attendance: 3,176
Referee: Gylfi Orrason (Iceland)

Odense won 9–1 on aggregate.

20 August 1996
20:30

Aberdeen (Scotland)	1–3	(Lithuania) Žalgiris Vilnius
Irvine 86'	Report	Mikulėnas 54', 87'; Pukelevičius 77' (pen.)

Pittodrie Stadium, Aberdeen
Attendance: 8,722
Referee: Claus Bo Larsen (Denmark)

Aberdeen won 5–4 on aggregate.

20 August 1996
20:30

Barry Town (Wales)	3–1 (a.e.t.)	(Hungary) BVSC
Pike 44' (pen.); O'Gorman 46'; C. Evans 77'	Report	Egressy 62'
Penalties
Pike (penalty scored); Bird (penalty scored); Lloyd (penalty scored); C. Evans (penalty scored)	4–2	(penalty scored) Stănici; (penalty missed) Bognár; (penalty scored) Farkas; (penalty missed) Bükszegi

Jenner Park, Barry
Attendance: 2,800
Referee: Andreas Georgiou (Cyprus)

4–4 on aggregate. Barry Town won 4–2 on penalties.

20 August 1996
16:30

Hutnik Kraków (Poland)	3–1	(Czech Republic) Sigma Olomouc
Yahaya 23'; Stolarz 39'; Romuzga 70'	Report	Kovář 5'

Stadion Suche Stawy, Kraków
Attendance: 4,000
Referee: Vladimir Ovchinnikov (Russia)

Hutnik Kraków won 3–2 on aggregate.

20 August 1996
17:30

Trabzonspor (Turkey)	4–1	(Slovakia) Slovan Bratislava
Mandıralı 1'; S. Arveladze 14'; Orhan 67'; Abdullah 70'	Report	Németh 52'

Hüseyin Avni Aker Stadium, Trabzon
Attendance: 12,500
Referee: Stefano Braschi (Italy)

Trabzonspor won 5–3 on aggregate.

20 August 1996
16:00

Național București (Romania)	1–0	(Federal Republic of Yugoslavia) Partizan
Moisescu 6'	Report

Stadionul Cotroceni, Bucharest
Attendance: 7,000
Referee: Taras Bezubyak (Russia)

Național București won 1–0 on aggregate.

20 August 1996
17:00

Lantana Tallinn (Estonia)	2–0	(Switzerland) Aarau
Lebret 82'; Hepner 88'	Report

Kadriorg Stadium, Tallinn
Attendance: 1,500
Referee: Jon Skjervold (Norway)

Aarau won 4–2 on aggregate.

20 August 1996
17:00

Spartak Moscow (Russia)	2–0	Croatia Zagreb
Melyoshin 29'; Alenichev 58'	Report

Lokomotiv Stadium, Moscow
Attendance: 10,000
Referee: Lutz Michael Fröhlich (Germany)

3–3 on aggregate. Spartak Moscow won on away goals.

20 August 1996
20:30

Tirol Innsbruck (Austria)	4–1	(Bulgaria) Slavia Sofia
Śliwowski 28'; Krinner 31'; Kitzbichler 43'; Zahariev 73' (o.g.)	Report	Tsvetanov 48'

Tivoli-Stadion, Innsbruck
Attendance: 6,000
Referee: Emanuel Zammit (Malta)

Tirol Innsbruck won 5–2 on aggregate.

20 August 1996
14:30

Torpedo Moscow (Russia)	2–0	(Croatia) Hajduk Split
Kamoltsev 17'; Vostrosablin 82' (pen.)	Report

Eduard Streltsov Stadium, Moscow
Attendance: 6,800
Referee: Vencel Tóth (Hungary)

Torpedo Moscow won 2–1 on aggregate.

20 August 1996
18:00

Bodø/Glimt (Norway)	2–1	(Israel) Beitar Jerusalem
Sørensen 6'; Johansen 60'	Report	Sallói 87'

Aspmyra Stadion, Bodø
Attendance: 1,690
Referee: Charles Schaack (Luxembourg)

Bodø/Glimt won 7–2 on aggregate.

20 August 1996
17:00

Mura (Slovenia)	0–2	(Denmark) Lyngby
	Report	C. Jensen 23'; Jónsson 68'

Mestni stadion Fazanerija, Murska Sobota
Attendance: 4,130
Referee: Athanasios Zachariadis (Greece)

Lyngby won 2–0 on aggregate.

20 August 1996
20:45

Celtic (Scotland)	1–0	(Slovakia) Košice
Cadete 87'	Report

Celtic Park, Glasgow
Attendance: 44,448
Referee: Juha Hirviniemi (Finland)

Celtic won 1–0 on aggregate.

20 August 1996
18:00

Chornomorets Odesa (Ukraine)	2–0	(Finland) HJK
Chumachenko 66'; Mizin 68'	Report

Central Stadium Chornomorets, Odesa
Attendance: 10,000
Referee: Morgan Norman (Sweden)

Chornomorets Odesa won 4–2 on aggregate.

20 August 1996
18:00

Molde (Norway)	0–0	(Georgia (country)) Dinamo Tbilisi
	Report

Molde Stadion, Molde
Attendance: 1,428
Referee: Herbie Barr (Northern Ireland)

Dinamo Tbilisi won 2–1 on aggregate.

20 August 1996
19:00

Malmö FF (Sweden)	1–1	(Latvia) Skonto
Kindvall 47'	Report	Stepanovs 80'

Malmö Stadion, Malmö
Attendance: 2,074
Referee: Peter Jones (England)

Malmö FF won 4–1 on aggregate.

20 August 1996
19:30

Beşiktaş (Turkey)	2–0	(Belarus) Dinamo Minsk
Oktay 67'; Sağlam 73'	Report

BJK İnönü Stadium, Istanbul
Attendance: 45,000
Referee: Joaquim Bento Marques (Portugal)

Beşiktaş won 3–2 on aggregate.

== First round ==
Team 1	Agg.	Team 2	1st leg	2nd leg
CSKA Moscow (Russia)	1–2	(Netherlands) Feyenoord	0–1	1–1
Ferencváros (Hungary)	5–3	(Greece) Olympiacos	3–1	2–2
Malmö FF (Sweden)	2–5	(Czech Republic) Slavia Prague	1–2	1–3
Molenbeek (Belgium)	0–3	(Turkey) Beşiktaş	0–0	0–3
Celtic (Scotland)	0–4	(Germany) Hamburg	0–2	0–2
Chornomorets Odesa (Ukraine)	0–2	(Romania) Național București	0–0	0–2
Tirol Innsbruck (Austria)	0–1	(France) Metz	0–0	0–1
Brøndby (Denmark)	7–0	(Switzerland) Aarau	5–0	2–0
Club Brugge (Belgium)	3–1	(Denmark) Lyngby	1–1	2–0
Odense (Denmark)	4–4 (a)	(Portugal) Boavista	2–3	2–1
Valencia (Spain)	3–1	(Germany) Bayern Munich	3–0	0–1
Roma (Italy)	6–1	(Russia) Dynamo Moscow	3–0	3–1
Dynamo Kyiv (Ukraine)	1–2	(Switzerland) Neuchâtel Xamax	0–0	1–2
Schalke 04 (Germany)	5–2	(Netherlands) Roda	3–0	2–2
Lens (France)	1–2	(Italy) Lazio	0–1	1–1
Guingamp (France)	1–4	(Italy) Inter Milan	0–3	1–1
Aberdeen (Scotland)	6–4	(Wales) Barry Town	3–1	3–3
Montpellier (France)	1–2	(Portugal) Sporting CP	1–1	0–1
Bodø/Glimt (Norway)	2–5	(Turkey) Trabzonspor	1–2	1–3
APOEL (Cyprus)	2–3	(Spain) Espanyol	2–2	0–1
Aston Villa (England)	1–1 (a)	(Sweden) Helsingborg	1–1	0–0
Germinal Ekeren (Belgium)	3–3 (a)	(Austria) GAK	3–1	0–2
Newcastle United (England)	5–2	(Sweden) Halmstad	4–0	1–2
Alania Vladikavkaz (Russia)	2–5	(Belgium) Anderlecht	2–1	0–4
Parma (Italy)	2–3	(Portugal) Vitória Guimarães	2–1	0–2
Torpedo Moscow (Russia)	1–2	(Georgia (country)) Dinamo Tbilisi	0–1	1–1
Tenerife (Spain)	4–3	(Israel) Maccabi Tel Aviv	3–2	1–1
Arsenal (England)	4–6	(Germany) Borussia Mönchengladbach	2–3	2–3
Hutnik Kraków (Poland)	1–4	(France) Monaco	0–1	1–3
Spartak Moscow (Russia)	5–3	(Denmark) Silkeborg	3–2	2–1
Panathinaikos (Greece)	4–4 (a)	(Poland) Legia Warsaw	4–2	0–2
Rapid București (Romania)	2–4	(Germany) Karlsruhe	1–0	1–4

=== First leg ===
10 September 1996
19:00

CSKA Moscow (Russia)	0–1	(Netherlands) Feyenoord
	Report	van Wonderen 83'

Central Dynamo Stadium, Moscow
Attendance: 5,000
Referee: Rune Pedersen (Norway)

10 September 1996
20:30

Ferencváros (Hungary)	3–1	(Greece) Olympiacos
Zavadszky 11'; Varešanović 35' (o.g.); Arany 52'	Report	Ivić 29'

Üllői úti Stadion, Budapest
Attendance: 9,000
Referee: René Temmink (Netherlands)

10 September 1996
19:00

Malmö FF (Sweden)	1–2	(Czech Republic) Slavia Prague
A. Andersson 83'	Report	Ašanin 70'; Vágner 86'

Malmö Stadion, Malmö
Attendance: 3,961
Referee: Aron Huzu (Romania)

10 September 1996
20:45

Molenbeek (Belgium)	0–0	(Turkey) Beşiktaş
	Report

Stade Edmond Machtens, Brussels
Attendance: 9,000
Referee: Peter Mikkelsen (Denmark)

10 September 1996
20:00

Celtic (Scotland)	0–2	(Germany) Hamburg
	Report	Bäron 3'; Schupp 71'

Celtic Park, Glasgow
Attendance: 45,400
Referee: Pierluigi Collina (Italy)

10 September 1996
16:00

Chornomorets Odesa (Ukraine)	0–0	(Romania) Național București
	Report

Central Stadium Chornomorets, Odesa
Attendance: 13,000
Referee: Metin Tokat (Turkey)

10 September 1996
20:30

Tirol Innsbruck (Austria)	0–0	(France) Metz
	Report

Tivoli-Stadion, Innsbruck
Attendance: 6,000
Referee: Dick Jol (Netherlands)

10 September 1996
20:05

Brøndby (Denmark)	5–0	(Switzerland) Aarau
Vilfort 21' (pen.); Bjur 56'; Møller 66', 87', 89'	Report

Brøndby Stadion, Brøndbyvester
Attendance: 8,976
Referee: Hugh Dallas (Scotland)

10 September 1996
20:00

Club Brugge (Belgium)	1–1	(Denmark) Lyngby
Staelens 2'	Report	Bjerre 34'

Olympiastadion, Bruges
Attendance: 6,000
Referee: Marek Kowalczyk (Poland)

10 September 1996
19:00

Odense (Denmark)	2–3	(Portugal) Boavista
Hemmingsen 43' (pen.); P. Pedersen 44' (pen.)	Report	Simić 53'; Nuno Gomes 74'; Tavares 82'

Odense Stadion, Odense
Attendance: 3,987
Referee: Štefan Tivold (Slovenia)

10 September 1996
22:30

Valencia (Spain)	3–0	(Germany) Bayern Munich
Engonga 19' (pen.); C. López 26'; Moya 47'	Report

Estadio de Mestalla, Valencia
Attendance: 40,000
Referee: Pierluigi Pairetto (Italy)

10 September 1996
20:45

Roma (Italy)	3–0	(Russia) Dynamo Moscow
Tommasi 7'; Fonseca 18', 41' (pen.)	Report

Stadio Olimpico, Rome
Attendance: 46,647
Referee: Alain Sars (France)

10 September 1996
18:00

Dynamo Kyiv (Ukraine)	0–0	(Switzerland) Neuchâtel Xamax
	Report

NSK Olimpiyskyi, Kyiv
Attendance: 35,000
Referee: Armand Ancion (Belgium)

10 September 1996
18:30

Schalke 04 (Germany)	3–0	(Netherlands) Roda
Wilmots 8'; Mulder 14'; Anderbrügge 74'	Report

Parkstadion, Gelsenkirchen
Attendance: 50,061
Referee: Graziano Cesari (Italy)

10 September 1996
20:45

Lens (France)	0–1	(Italy) Lazio
	Report	Chamot 85'

Stade Félix-Bollaert, Lens
Attendance: 18,174
Referee: John Rowbotham (Scotland)

10 September 1996
18:30

Guingamp (France)	0–3	(Italy) Inter Milan
	Report	Ganz 24'; Djorkaeff 71' (pen.); Sforza 85'

Stade de Roudourou, Guingamp
Attendance: 6,981
Referee: Manuel Díaz Vega (Spain)

10 September 1996
20:30

Aberdeen (Scotland)	3–1	(Wales) Barry Town
Windass 7'; Glass 57'; Da. Young 65'	Report	Jones 13'

Pittodrie Stadium, Aberdeen
Attendance: 13,400
Referee: Alan Snoddy (Northern Ireland)

10 September 1996
20:00

Montpellier (France)	1–1	(Portugal) Sporting CP
Ferhaoui 9'	Report	Hadji 64'

Stade de la Mosson, Montpellier
Attendance: 7,423
Referee: Ryszard Wójcik (Poland)

10 September 1996
19:00

Bodø/Glimt (Norway)	1–2	(Turkey) Trabzonspor
R. Berg 30'	Report	S. Arveladze 3'; Karaman 74'

Aspmyra Stadion, Bodø
Attendance: 1,955
Referee: Jiří Ulrich (Czech Republic)

10 September 1996
20:15

APOEL (Cyprus)	2–2	(Spain) Espanyol
Alexandrou 26'; Sotiriou 55'	Report	Benítez 30'; Ouédec 44'

Makario Stadium, Nicosia
Attendance: 12,000
Referee: Taras Bezubyak (Russia)

10 September 1996
20:45

Aston Villa (England)	1–1	(Sweden) Helsingborg
Johnson 14'	Report	Wibrån 81'

Villa Park, Birmingham
Attendance: 25,818
Referee: Loizos Loizou (Cyprus)

10 September 1996
18:30

Germinal Ekeren (Belgium)	3–1	(Austria) GAK
Radzinski 56'; Vande Walle 59' (pen.); Czerniatynski 82'	Report	Strafner 8'

Veltwijckpark, Antwerp
Attendance: 3,000
Referee: Emanuel Zammit (Malta)

10 September 1996
21:00

Newcastle United (England)	4–0	(Sweden) Halmstad
Ferdinand 7'; Asprilla 26'; Albert 51'; Beardsley 55'	Report

St James' Park, Newcastle upon Tyne
Attendance: 28,124
Referee: Knud Erik Fisker (Denmark)

10 September 1996
18:00

Alania Vladikavkaz (Russia)	2–1	(Belgium) Anderlecht
Yanovsky 21'; Shelia 49'	Report	Pagayev 4' (o.g.)

Republican Spartak Stadium, Vladikavkaz
Attendance: 35,000
Referee: Robert Sedlacek (Austria)

10 September 1996
20:45

Parma (Italy)	2–1	(Portugal) Vitória Guimarães
Chiesa 40', 82'	Report	Gilmar 77'

Stadio Ennio Tardini, Parma
Attendance: 5,863
Referee: Giorgos Bikas (Greece)

10 September 1996
16:30

Torpedo Moscow (Russia)	0–1	(Georgia (country)) Dinamo Tbilisi
	Report	Jamarauli 37'

Eduard Streltsov Stadium, Moscow
Attendance: 8,000
Referee: Leif Sundell (Sweden)

10 September 1996
20:00

Tenerife (Spain)	3–2	(Israel) Maccabi Tel Aviv
Vivar Dorado 45'; Kodro 56'; Pinilla 66'	Report	Mizrahi 60'; Nimni 88' (pen.)

Estadio Heliodoro Rodríguez López, Santa Cruz de Tenerife
Attendance: 18,000
Referee: Bernd Heynemann (Germany)

10 September 1996
20:30

Arsenal (England)	2–3	(Germany) Borussia Mönchengladbach
Merson 54'; Wright 90'	Report	Juskowiak 37'; Effenberg 47'; Paßlack 81'

Highbury, London
Attendance: 36,900
Referee: Urs Meier (Switzerland)

11 September 1996
16:00

Hutnik Kraków (Poland)	0–1	(France) Monaco
	Report	Ikpeba 86'

Stadion Suche Stawy, Kraków
Attendance: 8,000
Referee: Joaquim Bento Marques (Portugal)

11 September 1996
15:00

Spartak Moscow (Russia)	3–2	(Denmark) Silkeborg
Tikhonov 14', 37'; Kechinov 20'	Report	Thygesen 54'; Reese 73'

Luzhniki Stadium, Moscow
Attendance: 7,000
Referee: Marnix Sandra (Belgium)

11 September 1996
18:00

Panathinaikos (Greece)	4–2	(Poland) Legia Warsaw
Liberopoulos 26', 38'; Alexoudis 34'; G. C. Georgiadis 80'	Report	Czykier 3'; Kucharski 45'

Olympic Stadium, Athens
Attendance: 25,185
Referee: Mike Reed (England)

11 September 1996
18:00

Rapid București (Romania)	1–0	(Germany) Karlsruhe
Reich 67' (o.g.)	Report

Stadionul Giulești, Bucharest
Attendance: 13,000
Referee: Roy Helge Olsen (Norway)

=== Second leg ===
24 September 1996
20:30

Feyenoord (Netherlands)	1–1	(Russia) CSKA Moscow
van Wonderen 71'	Report	Minko 57'

De Kuip, Rotterdam
Attendance: 27,500
Referee: Jorge Coroado (Portugal)

Feyenoord won 2–1 on aggregate.

24 September 1996
20:00

Olympiacos (Greece)	2–2	(Hungary) Ferencváros
Ivić 27'; Sapanis 76'	Report	Miriuță 22'; Limperger 46'

Karaiskakis Stadium, Piraeus
Attendance: 27,118
Referee: Hartmut Strampe (Germany)

Ferencváros won 5–3 on aggregate.

24 September 1996
16:30

Slavia Prague (Czech Republic)	3–1	(Sweden) Malmö FF
Pěnička 13'; Vágner 29'; Horváth 69' (pen.)	Report	Fjellström 57'

Stadion Eden, Prague
Attendance: 4,602
Referee: Alfredo Trentalange (Italy)

Slavia Prague won 5–2 on aggregate.

24 September 1996
19:30

Beşiktaş (Turkey)	3–0	(Belgium) Molenbeek
Sağlam 40'; Amokachi 50'; Oktay 87'	Report

BJK İnönü Stadium, Istanbul
Attendance: 22,465
Referee: Vasyl Melnychuk (Ukraine)

Beşiktaş won 3–0 on aggregate.

24 September 1996
18:30

Hamburg (Germany)	2–0	(Scotland) Celtic
Bäron 24'; Breitenreiter 50'	Report

Volksparkstadion, Hamburg
Attendance: 29,600
Referee: Vadzim Zhuk (Belarus)

Hamburg won 4–0 on aggregate.

24 September 1996
14:30

Național București (Romania)	2–0	(Ukraine) Chornomorets Odesa
Moisescu 46'; Niculescu 58'	Report

Stadionul Cotroceni, Bucharest
Attendance: 7,000
Referee: Fernand Meese (Belgium)

Național București won 2–0 on aggregate.

24 September 1996
20:30

Metz (France)	1–0	(Austria) Tirol Innsbruck
Song 42'	Report

Stade Saint-Symphorien, Longeville-lès-Metz
Attendance: 11,940
Referee: Dimitar Momirov (Bulgaria)

Metz won 1–0 on aggregate.

24 September 1996
20:00

Aarau (Switzerland)	0–2	(Denmark) Brøndby
	Report	Møller 39'; Daugaard 90' (pen.)

Stadion Brügglifeld, Aarau
Attendance: 2,010
Referee: Leslie Irvine (Northern Ireland)

Brøndby won 7–0 on aggregate.

24 September 1996
20:00

Lyngby (Denmark)	0–2	(Belgium) Club Brugge
	Report	Borkelmans 61'; Špehar 84'

Lyngby Stadion, Kongens Lyngby
Attendance: 3,721
Referee: Algirdas Dubinskas (Lithuania)

Club Brugge won 3–1 on aggregate.

24 September 1996
19:00

Boavista (Portugal)	1–2	(Denmark) Odense
Nuno Gomes 11'	Report	Hjorth 66'; U. Pedersen 69'

Estádio do Bessa, Porto
Attendance: 250
Referee: Alan Howells (Wales)

4–4 on aggregate. Boavista won on away goals.

24 September 1996
20:30

Bayern Munich (Germany)	1–0	(Spain) Valencia
Navarro 3' (o.g.)	Report

Olympiastadion, Munich
Attendance: 44,000
Referee: Nikolai Levnikov (Russia)

Valencia won 3–1 on aggregate.

24 September 1996
18:30

Dynamo Moscow (Russia)	1–3	(Italy) Roma
Kobelev 18' (pen.)	Report	Fonseca 45' (pen.); Tommasi 71'; Berretta 77'

Central Dynamo Stadium, Moscow
Attendance: 5,000
Referee: László Vágner (Hungary)

Roma won 6–1 on aggregate.

24 September 1996
20:00

Neuchâtel Xamax (Switzerland)	2–1	(Ukraine) Dynamo Kyiv
Leśniak 25'; Isabella 54'	Report	Maksymov 59'

Stade de la Maladière, Neuchâtel
Attendance: 8,600
Referee: Charles Agius (Malta)

Neuchâtel Xamax won 2–1 on aggregate.

24 September 1996
14:00

Roda (Netherlands)	2–2	(Germany) Schalke 04
Vurens 25'; Dooley 75' (o.g.)	Report	Wagner 15'; Wilmots 72'

Gemeentelijk Sportpark Kaalheide, Kerkrade
Attendance: 8,000
Referee: Sándor Puhl (Hungary)

Schalke 04 won 5–2 on aggregate.

24 September 1996
20:45

Lazio (Italy)	1–1	(France) Lens
Fuser 43'	Report	Šmicer 68'

Stadio Olimpico, Rome
Attendance: 30,000
Referee: Gerd Grabher (Austria)

Lazio won 2–1 on aggregate.

24 September 1996
20:45

Inter Milan (Italy)	1–1	(France) Guingamp
Branca 7'	Report	Wreh 75'

Stadio Giuseppe Meazza, Milan
Attendance: 7,000
Referee: Alain Hamer (Luxembourg)

Inter Milan won 4–1 on aggregate.

24 September 1996
20:30

Barry Town (Wales)	3–3	(Scotland) Aberdeen
O'Gorman 4'; Ryan 71' (pen.); Bird 83'	Report	Dodds 15', 26'; Rowson 84'

Jenner Park, Barry
Attendance: 6,500
Referee: Ľuboš Micheľ (Slovakia)

Aberdeen won 6–4 on aggregate.

24 September 1996
21:00

Sporting CP (Portugal)	1–0	(France) Montpellier
Oceano 61' (pen.)	Report

Estádio José Alvalade, Lisbon
Attendance: 18,000
Referee: Ilkka Koho (Finland)

Sporting CP won 2–1 on aggregate.

24 September 1996
17:30

Trabzonspor (Turkey)	3–1	(Norway) Bodø/Glimt
Karaman 36'; Mandıralı 38'; Özer 44'	Report	Johansen 88'

Hüseyin Avni Aker Stadium, Trabzon
Attendance: 20,000
Referee: Philippe Leduc (France)

Trabzonspor won 5–2 on aggregate.

24 September 1996
21:30

Espanyol (Spain)	1–0	(Cyprus) APOEL
Cristóbal 63'	Report

Estadi de Sarrià, Barcelona
Attendance: 19,000
Referee: João Pinto Correia (Portugal)

Espanyol won 3–2 on aggregate.

24 September 1996
21:00

Helsingborg (Sweden)	0–0	(England) Aston Villa
	Report

Olympia, Helsingborg
Attendance: 10,000
Referee: Roger Philippi (Luxembourg)

1–1 on aggregate. Helsingborg won on away goals.

24 September 1996
18:00

GAK (Austria)	2–0	(Belgium) Germinal Ekeren
Sabitzer 65', 85' (pen.)	Report

Alpenstadion, Kapfenberg
Attendance: 3,000
Referee: Krste Danilovski (Macedonia)

3–3 on aggregate. GAK won on away goals.

24 September 1996
20:00

Halmstad (Sweden)	2–1	(England) Newcastle United
Arvidsson 74'; M. Svensson 81'	Report	Ferdinand 43'

Örjans Vall, Halmstad
Attendance: 7,847
Referee: Sándor Piller (Hungary)

Newcastle United won 5–2 on aggregate.

24 September 1996
20:30

Anderlecht (Belgium)	4–0	(Russia) Alania Vladikavkaz
Johnson 29'; De Bilde 38'; Zetterberg 62', 68'	Report

Stade Constant Vanden Stock, Brussels
Attendance: 21,109
Referee: Gheorghe Constantin (Romania)

Anderlecht won 5–2 on aggregate.

24 September 1996
22:00

Vitória Guimarães (Portugal)	2–0	(Italy) Parma
Paneira 16'; Ricardo Lopes 50'	Report

Estádio D. Afonso Henriques, Guimarães
Attendance: 28,000
Referee: Marc Batta (France)

Vitória Guimarães won 3–2 on aggregate.

24 September 1996
16:00

Dinamo Tbilisi (Georgia (country))	1–1	(Russia) Torpedo Moscow
Jamarauli 48'	Report	Vostrosablin 82'

Boris Paichadze National Stadium, Tbilisi
Attendance: 55,000
Referee: Hellmut Krug (Germany)

Dinamo Tbilisi won 2–1 on aggregate.

24 September 1996
18:45

Monaco (France)	3–1	(Poland) Hutnik Kraków
Anderson 37', 83'; Martin 81'	Report	Adamczyk 64' (pen.)

Stade Louis-II, Monaco
Attendance: 4,500
Referee: Claude Détruche (Switzerland)

Monaco won 4–1 on aggregate.

24 September 1996
20:10

Silkeborg (Denmark)	1–2	(Russia) Spartak Moscow
Thygesen 30'	Report	Tikhonov 41'; Sønksen 51' (o.g.)

Silkeborg Stadion, Silkeborg
Attendance: 3,565
Referee: Dragutin Poljak (Croatia)

Spartak Moscow won 5–3 on aggregate.

24 September 1996
20:30

Legia Warsaw (Poland)	2–0	(Greece) Panathinaikos
Mięciel 53'; Kucharski 90'	Report

Polish Army Stadium, Warsaw
Attendance: 10,000
Referee: Juan Ansuátegui Roca (Spain)

4–4 on aggregate. Legia Warsaw won on away goals.

24 September 1996
16:00

Karlsruhe (Germany)	4–1	(Romania) Rapid București
Keller 51', 78'; Wück 57'; Dundee 69'	Report	Chiriță 71'

Wildparkstadion, Karlsruhe
Attendance: 16,200
Referee: Hubert Byrne (Republic of Ireland)

Karlsruhe won 4–2 on aggregate.

25 September 1996
17:00

Maccabi Tel Aviv (Israel)	1–1	(Spain) Tenerife
G. Brumer 49'	Report	Vivar Dorado 43'

Bloomfield Stadium, Tel Aviv
Attendance: 15,000
Referee: Gilles Veissière (France)

Tenerife won 4–3 on aggregate.

25 September 1996
17:30

Borussia Mönchengladbach (Germany)	3–2	(England) Arsenal
Juskowiak 23', 89'; Effenberg 75'	Report	Wright 43'; Merson 51'

Müngersdorfer Stadion, Cologne
Attendance: 30,000
Referee: Antonio López Nieto (Spain)

Borussia Mönchengladbach won 6–4 on aggregate.

== Second round ==
Team 1	Agg.	Team 2	1st leg	2nd leg
Dinamo Tbilisi (Georgia (country))	1–5	(Portugal) Boavista	1–0	0–5
Ferencváros (Hungary)	3–6	(England) Newcastle United	3–2	0–4
Club Brugge (Belgium)	3–1	(Romania) Național București	2–0	1–1
Vitória Guimarães (Portugal)	1–1 (a)	(Belgium) Anderlecht	1–1	0–0
Metz (France)	3–2	(Portugal) Sporting CP	2–0	1–2
Espanyol (Spain)	1–3	(Netherlands) Feyenoord	0–3	1–0
Aberdeen (Scotland)	0–2	(Denmark) Brøndby	0–2	0–0
Slavia Prague (Czech Republic)	0–1	(Spain) Valencia	0–1	0–0
Lazio (Italy)	4–5	(Spain) Tenerife	1–0	3–5
Inter Milan (Italy)	1–1 (5–3 p)	(Austria) GAK	1–0	0–1 (aet)
Helsingborg (Sweden)	3–1	(Switzerland) Neuchâtel Xamax	2–0	1–1
Legia Warsaw (Poland)	2–3	(Turkey) Beşiktaş	1–1	1–2
Schalke 04 (Germany)	4–3	(Turkey) Trabzonspor	1–0	3–3
Borussia Mönchengladbach (Germany)	3–4	(France) Monaco	2–4	1–0
Karlsruhe (Germany)	4–2	(Italy) Roma	3–0	1–2
Hamburg (Germany)	5–2	(Russia) Spartak Moscow	3–0	2–2

=== First leg ===
15 October 1996
15:00

Dinamo Tbilisi (Georgia (country))	1–0	(Portugal) Boavista
Gogichaishvili 28' (pen.)	Report

Boris Paichadze National Stadium, Tbilisi
Attendance: 65,000
Referee: Fernand Meese (Belgium)

15 October 1996
21:00

Ferencváros (Hungary)	3–2	(England) Newcastle United
Horváth 7'; Lisztes 17', 57'	Report	Ferdinand 25'; Shearer 35'

Üllői úti Stadion, Budapest
Attendance: 18,000
Referee: Leif Sundell (Sweden)

15 October 1996
20:00

Club Brugge (Belgium)	2–0	(Romania) Național București
Verheyen 10'; Staelens 39'	Report

Olympiastadion, Bruges
Attendance: 10,000
Referee: Alan Howells (Wales)

15 October 1996
22:00

Vitória Guimarães (Portugal)	1–1	(Belgium) Anderlecht
Ricardo Lopes 7'	Report	Zetterberg 77'

Estádio D. Afonso Henriques, Guimarães
Attendance: 15,000
Referee: Stephen Lodge (England)

15 October 1996
19:00

Metz (France)	2–0	(Portugal) Sporting CP
Traoré 5'; Lang 13'	Report

Stade Saint-Symphorien, Longeville-lès-Metz
Attendance: 14,000
Referee: Mike Reed (England)

15 October 1996
21:30

Espanyol (Spain)	0–3	(Netherlands) Feyenoord
	Report	van Gastel 22'; Taument 54'; Larsson 89'

Estadi de Sarrià, Barcelona
Attendance: 29,000
Referee: Václav Krondl (Czech Republic)

15 October 1996
21:00

Aberdeen (Scotland)	0–2	(Denmark) Brøndby
	Report	Sand 44'; Hansen 88'

Pittodrie Stadium, Aberdeen
Attendance: 15,000
Referee: Mateo Beusan (Croatia)

15 October 1996
19:30

Slavia Prague (Czech Republic)	0–1	(Spain) Valencia
	Report	Moya 73'

Stadion Evžena Rošického, Prague
Attendance: 10,012
Referee: Ahmet Çakar (Turkey)

15 October 1996
20:45

Lazio (Italy)	1–0	(Spain) Tenerife
Nedvěd 65'	Report

Stadio Olimpico, Rome
Attendance: 18,000
Referee: Sándor Puhl (Hungary)

15 October 1996
20:45

Inter Milan (Italy)	1–0	(Austria) GAK
Angloma 80'	Report

Stadio Giuseppe Meazza, Milan
Attendance: 8,145
Referee: Dick Jol (Netherlands)

15 October 1996
20:00

Helsingborg (Sweden)	2–0	(Switzerland) Neuchâtel Xamax
Jonson 14', 60'	Report

Olympia, Helsingborg
Attendance: 7,808
Referee: Miroslav Radoman (FR Yugoslavia)

15 October 1996
19:00

Legia Warsaw (Poland)	1–1	(Turkey) Beşiktaş
Sokołowski 22'	Report	Kaynak 70'

Polish Army Stadium, Warsaw
Attendance: 16,000
Referee: Vítor Melo Pereira (Portugal)

15 October 1996
17:00

Schalke 04 (Germany)	1–0	(Turkey) Trabzonspor
Max 76'	Report

Parkstadion, Gelsenkirchen
Attendance: 51,100
Referee: José María García-Aranda (Spain)

15 October 1996
20:45

Borussia Mönchengladbach (Germany)	2–4	(France) Monaco
Hochstätter 57'; Andersson 72'	Report	Collins 12'; Ikpeba 58', 89'; Henry 77'

Müngersdorfer Stadion, Cologne
Attendance: 25,000
Referee: Paul Durkin (England)

15 October 1996
19:00

Karlsruhe (Germany)	3–0	(Italy) Roma
Fink 45', 75'; Dundee 58'	Report

Wildparkstadion, Karlsruhe
Attendance: 25,000
Referee: Jorge Coroado (Portugal)

16 October 1996
18:00

Hamburg (Germany)	3–0	(Russia) Spartak Moscow
Breitenreiter 8'; Bäron 39'; Kovačević 58'	Report

Volksparkstadion, Hamburg
Attendance: 17,300
Referee: Terje Hauge (Norway)

=== Second leg ===
29 October 1996
22:30

Boavista (Portugal)	5–0	(Georgia (country)) Dinamo Tbilisi
Latapy 4', 70'; Hasselbaink 27', 54'; Tavares 90'	Report

Estádio do Bessa, Porto
Attendance: 16,000
Referee: Roger Philippi (Luxembourg)

Boavista won 5–1 on aggregate.

29 October 1996
21:00

Newcastle United (England)	4–0	(Hungary) Ferencváros
Asprilla 43', 59'; Ginola 66'; Ferdinand 90'	Report

St James' Park, Newcastle upon Tyne
Attendance: 35,470
Referee: Sergei Khusainov (Russia)

Newcastle United won 6–3 on aggregate.

29 October 1996
20:00

Național București (Romania)	1–1	(Belgium) Club Brugge
Niculescu 66'	Report	Verheyen 64'

Stadionul Cotroceni, Bucharest
Attendance: 15,000
Referee: Manfred Schüttengruber (Austria)

Club Brugge won 3–1 on aggregate.

29 October 1996
20:30

Anderlecht (Belgium)	0–0	(Portugal) Vitória Guimarães
	Report

Stade Constant Vanden Stock, Brussels
Attendance: 17,694
Referee: Markus Merk (Germany)

1–1 on aggregate. Anderlecht won on away goals.

29 October 1996
21:30

Sporting CP (Portugal)	2–1	(France) Metz
Sá Pinto 73', 83'	Report	Arpinon 18'

Estádio José Alvalade, Lisbon
Attendance: 15,000
Referee: Alfredo Trentalange (Italy)

Metz won 3–2 on aggregate.

29 October 1996
20:30

Feyenoord (Netherlands)	0–1	(Spain) Espanyol
	Report	Arteaga 9'

De Kuip, Rotterdam
Attendance: 27,600
Referee: Piero Ceccarini (Italy)

Feyenoord won 3–1 on aggregate.

29 October 1996
20:10

Brøndby (Denmark)	0–0	(Scotland) Aberdeen
	Report

Brøndby Stadion, Brøndbyvester
Attendance: 12,005
Referee: Vasyl Melnychuk (Ukraine)

Brøndby won 2–0 on aggregate.

29 October 1996
21:30

Valencia (Spain)	0–0	(Czech Republic) Slavia Prague
	Report

Estadio de Mestalla, Valencia
Attendance: 38,000
Referee: Günter Benkö (Austria)

Valencia won 1–0 on aggregate.

29 October 1996
21:30

Tenerife (Spain)	5–3	(Italy) Lazio
Nesta 15' (o.g.); Kodro 26'; Juanele 38', 62'; Jokanović 48'	Report	Nedvěd 13'; Fuser 30'; Casiraghi 46'

Estadio Heliodoro Rodríguez López, Santa Cruz de Tenerife
Attendance: 22,300
Referee: Ilkka Koho (Finland)

Tenerife won 5–4 on aggregate.

29 October 1996
19:00

GAK (Austria)	1–0 (a.e.t.)	(Italy) Inter Milan
Sabitzer 36' (pen.)	Report
Penalties
Aničić (penalty scored); Dampfhofer (penalty missed); Rajković (penalty scored); Mužek (penalty scored)	3–5	(penalty scored) Zamorano; (penalty scored) Djorkaeff; (penalty scored) Berti; (penalty scored) Pistone; (penalty scored) Fresi

Alpenstadion, Kapfenberg
Attendance: 10,500
Referee: Gilles Veissière (France)

1–1 on aggregate. Inter Milan won 5–3 on penalties.

29 October 1996
20:15

Neuchâtel Xamax (Switzerland)	1–1	(Sweden) Helsingborg
Bonalair 51' (pen.)	Report	Jonson 42'

Stade de la Maladière, Neuchâtel
Attendance: 7,200
Referee: Nikolai Levnikov (Russia)

Helsingborg won 3–1 on aggregate.

29 October 1996
20:00

Beşiktaş (Turkey)	2–1	(Poland) Legia Warsaw
Amokachi 13'; Yankov 76'	Report	Kucharski 37'

BJK İnönü Stadium, Istanbul
Attendance: 35,000
Referee: Gheorghe Constantin (Romania)

Beşiktaş won 3–2 on aggregate.

29 October 1996
17:15

Trabzonspor (Turkey)	3–3	(Germany) Schalke 04
S. Arveladze 55'; Mandıralı 66', 71'	Report	de Kock 33', 36'; Max 73'

Hüseyin Avni Aker Stadium, Trabzon
Attendance: 23,000
Referee: Éric Blareau (Belgium)

Schalke 04 won 4–3 on aggregate.

29 October 1996
19:00

Monaco (France)	0–1	(Germany) Borussia Mönchengladbach
	Report	Klinkert 73'

Stade Louis-II, Monaco
Attendance: 17,000
Referee: René Temmink (Netherlands)

Monaco won 4–3 on aggregate.

29 October 1996
20:45

Roma (Italy)	2–1	(Germany) Karlsruhe
Balbo 21', 27'	Report	Keller 84'

Stadio Olimpico, Rome
Attendance: 46,400
Referee: Urs Meier (Switzerland)

Karlsruhe won 4–2 on aggregate.

29 October 1996
15:00

Spartak Moscow (Russia)	2–2	(Germany) Hamburg
Melyoshin 10'; Tikhonov 42' (pen.)	Report	Schupp 29'; Hartmann 73'

Luzhniki Stadium, Moscow
Attendance: 8,000
Referee: Juan Ansuátegui Roca (Spain)

Hamburg won 5–2 on aggregate.

== Third round ==
Team 1	Agg.	Team 2	1st leg	2nd leg
Brøndby (Denmark)	6–3	(Germany) Karlsruhe	1–3	5–0
Club Brugge (Belgium)	2–3	(Germany) Schalke 04	2–1	0–2
Monaco (France)	5–0	(Germany) Hamburg	3–0	2–0
Helsingborg (Sweden)	0–1	(Belgium) Anderlecht	0–0	0–1
Valencia (Spain)	5–3	(Turkey) Beşiktaş	3–1	2–2
Metz (France)	1–3	(England) Newcastle United	1–1	0–2
Inter Milan (Italy)	7–1	(Portugal) Boavista	5–1	2–0
Tenerife (Spain)	4–2	(Netherlands) Feyenoord	0–0	4–2

=== First leg ===
19 November 1996
21:00

Brøndby (Denmark)	1–3	(Germany) Karlsruhe
Bagger 90'	Report	Häßler 42', 44'; Dundee 78'

Brøndby Stadion, Brøndbyvester
Attendance: 24,400
Referee: Gilles Veissière (France)

19 November 1996
16:00

Club Brugge (Belgium)	2–1	(Germany) Schalke 04
Stanić 34'; Špehar 58'	Report	Büskens 50'

Olympiastadion, Bruges
Attendance: 14,000
Referee: Piero Ceccarini (Italy)

19 November 1996
18:00

Monaco (France)	3–0	(Germany) Hamburg
Anderson 49'; Ikpeba 71'; Blondeau 76'	Report

Stade Louis-II, Monaco
Attendance: 9,000
Referee: Anders Frisk (Sweden)

19 November 1996
20:00

Helsingborg (Sweden)	0–0	(Belgium) Anderlecht
	Report

Olympia, Helsingborg
Attendance: 8,304
Referee: Rémi Harrel (France)

19 November 1996
21:30

Valencia (Spain)	3–1	(Turkey) Beşiktaş
Vlaović 17'; Günçar 23' (o.g.); Ferreira 82'	Report	Oktay 32'

Estadio de Mestalla, Valencia
Attendance: 30,000
Referee: Michel Piraux (Belgium)

19 November 1996
21:00

Metz (France)	1–1	(England) Newcastle United
Traoré 67'	Report	Beardsley 31' (pen.)

Stade Saint-Symphorien, Longeville-lès-Metz
Attendance: 16,700
Referee: Günter Benkö (Austria)

19 November 1996
20:45

Inter Milan (Italy)	5–1	(Portugal) Boavista
Sforza 6', 58'; Angloma 14'; Ganz 23', 66'	Report	Hasselbaink 62'

Stadio Giuseppe Meazza, Milan
Attendance: 20,018
Referee: Paul Durkin (England)

19 November 1996
21:45

Tenerife (Spain)	0–0	(Netherlands) Feyenoord
	Report

Estadio Heliodoro Rodríguez López, Santa Cruz de Tenerife
Attendance: 22,000
Referee: Pierluigi Pairetto (Italy)

=== Second leg ===
3 December 1996
16:30

Karlsruhe (Germany)	0–5	(Denmark) Brøndby
	Report	Bagger 41'; Eggen 43'; Vilfort 58'; Møller 74', 81'

Wildparkstadion, Karlsruhe
Attendance: 21,000
Referee: David Elleray (England)

Brøndby won 6–3 on aggregate.

3 December 1996
18:30

Schalke 04 (Germany)	2–0	(Belgium) Club Brugge
Max 9'; Mulder 89'	Report

Parkstadion, Gelsenkirchen
Attendance: 46,300
Referee: Vítor Melo Pereira (Portugal)

Schalke 04 won 3–2 on aggregate.

3 December 1996
20:30

Hamburg (Germany)	0–2	(France) Monaco
	Report	Ikpeba 64'; Benarbia 89' (pen.)

Volksparkstadion, Hamburg
Attendance: 28,600
Referee: Juan Fernández Marín (Spain)

Monaco won 5–0 on aggregate.

3 December 1996
20:30

Anderlecht (Belgium)	1–0	(Sweden) Helsingborg
Walem 68'	Report

Stade Constant Vanden Stock, Brussels
Attendance: 11,000
Referee: Charles Agius (Malta)

Anderlecht won 1–0 on aggregate.

3 December 1996
19:00

Beşiktaş (Turkey)	2–2	(Spain) Valencia
Serdar 15'; Oktay 45' (pen.)	Report	C. López 24'; Vlaović 43'

BJK İnönü Stadium, Istanbul
Attendance: 35,000
Referee: Mario van der Ende (Netherlands)

Valencia won 5–3 on aggregate.

3 December 1996
21:00

Newcastle United (England)	2–0	(France) Metz
Asprilla 80', 82'	Report

St James' Park, Newcastle upon Tyne
Attendance: 35,641
Referee: Serge Muhmenthaler (Switzerland)

Newcastle United won 3–1 on aggregate.

3 December 1996
20:45

Boavista (Portugal)	0–2	(Italy) Inter Milan
	Report	Djorkaeff 12' (pen.); Ince 66'

Estádio do Bessa, Porto
Attendance: 15,000
Referee: Markus Merk (Germany)

Inter Milan won 7–1 on aggregate.

3 December 1996
20:30

Feyenoord (Netherlands)	2–4	(Spain) Tenerife
Sánchez 84'; Vos 89'	Report	Felipe 6'; Juanele 44', 63'; Paz 77'

De Kuip, Rotterdam
Attendance: 30,000
Referee: Hellmut Krug (Germany)

Tenerife won 4–2 on aggregate.

== Quarter-finals ==
Team 1	Agg.	Team 2	1st leg	2nd leg
Newcastle United (England)	0–4	(France) Monaco	0–1	0–3
Anderlecht (Belgium)	2–3	(Italy) Inter Milan	1–1	1–2
Schalke 04 (Germany)	3–1	(Spain) Valencia	2–0	1–1
Tenerife (Spain)	2–1	(Denmark) Brøndby	0–1	2–0 (aet)

=== First leg ===
4 March 1997
21:00

Newcastle United (England)	0–1	(France) Monaco
	Report	Anderson 58'

St James' Park, Newcastle upon Tyne
Attendance: 35,641
Referee: Piero Ceccarini (Italy)

4 March 1997
20:30

Anderlecht (Belgium)	1–1	(Italy) Inter Milan
Versavel 27'	Report	Ganz 75'

Stade Constant Vanden Stock, Brussels
Attendance: 27,000
Referee: Sándor Puhl (Hungary)

4 March 1997
20:45

Schalke 04 (Germany)	2–0	(Spain) Valencia
Linke 44'; Wilmots 78'	Report

Parkstadion, Gelsenkirchen
Attendance: 56,824
Referee: Ryszard Wójcik (Poland)

4 March 1997
21:30

Tenerife (Spain)	0–1	(Denmark) Brøndby
	Report	Sand 29'

Estadio Heliodoro Rodríguez López, Santa Cruz de Tenerife
Attendance: 22,000
Referee: Pierluigi Collina (Italy)

=== Second leg ===
18 March 1997
20:30

Monaco (France)	3–0	(England) Newcastle United
Legwinski 41'; Benarbia 51', 68'	Report

Stade Louis-II, Monaco
Attendance: 18,500
Referee: Manuel Díaz Vega (Spain)

Monaco won 4–0 on aggregate.

18 March 1997
20:45

Inter Milan (Italy)	2–1	(Belgium) Anderlecht
Ganz 11', 60'	Report	Preko 33'

Stadio Giuseppe Meazza, Milan
Attendance: 43,221
Referee: Bernd Heynemann (Germany)

Inter Milan won 3–2 on aggregate.

18 March 1997
22:00

Valencia (Spain)	1–1	(Germany) Schalke 04
Poyatos 45'	Report	Mulder 18'

Estadio de Mestalla, Valencia
Attendance: 46,000
Referee: Rune Pedersen (Norway)

Schalke 04 won 3–1 on aggregate.

18 March 1997
19:30

Brøndby (Denmark)	0–2 (a.e.t.)	(Spain) Tenerife
	Report	Pinilla 21'; Mata 119'

Parken Stadium, Copenhagen
Attendance: 39,807
Referee: Michel Piraux (Belgium)

Tenerife won 2–1 on aggregate.

== Semi-finals ==
Team 1	Agg.	Team 2	1st leg	2nd leg
Inter Milan (Italy)	3–2	(France) Monaco	3–1	0–1
Tenerife (Spain)	1–2	(Germany) Schalke 04	1–0	0–2 (aet)

=== First leg ===
8 April 1997
20:45

Inter Milan (Italy)	3–1	(France) Monaco
Ganz 17', 30'; Zamorano 39'	Report	Ikpeba 70'

Stadio Giuseppe Meazza, Milan
Attendance: 49,078
Referee: Michel Piraux (Belgium)

8 April 1997
21:00

Tenerife (Spain)	1–0	(Germany) Schalke 04
Felipe 6' (pen.)	Report

Estadio Heliodoro Rodríguez López, Santa Cruz de Tenerife
Attendance: 21,000
Referee: David Elleray (England)

=== Second leg ===
22 April 1997
20:30

Monaco (France)	1–0	(Italy) Inter Milan
Ikpeba 69'	Report

Stade Louis-II, Monaco
Attendance: 18,524
Referee: Mario van der Ende (Netherlands)

Inter Milan won 3–2 on aggregate.

22 April 1997
20:45

Schalke 04 (Germany)	2–0 (a.e.t.)	(Spain) Tenerife
Linke 68'; Wilmots 107'	Report

Parkstadion, Gelsenkirchen
Attendance: 56,824
Referee: Sándor Puhl (Hungary)

Schalke 04 won 2–1 on aggregate.

== Final ==
=== First leg ===
7 May 1997
20:45 CEST

Schalke 04 (Germany)	1–0	(Italy) Inter Milan
Wilmots 69'	Report

Parkstadion, Gelsenkirchen
Attendance: 56,824
Referee: Marc Batta (France)

=== Second leg ===
21 May 1997
20:45 CEST

Inter Milan (Italy)	1–0 (a.e.t.)	(Germany) Schalke 04
Zamorano 84'	Report
Penalties
Zamorano (penalty missed); Djorkaeff (penalty scored); Winter (penalty missed)	1–4	(penalty scored) Anderbrügge; (penalty scored) Thon; (penalty scored) Max; (penalty scored) Wilmots

Stadio Giuseppe Meazza, Milan
Attendance: 81,675
Referee: José María García-Aranda (Spain)

1–1 on aggregate. Schalke 04 won 4–1 on penalties.

== Top scorers ==
The top scorers from the 1996–97 UEFA Cup are as follows:

Rank	Name	Team	Goals
1	(Italy) Maurizio Ganz	(Italy) Inter Milan	8
2	(Nigeria) Victor Ikpeba	(France) Monaco	7
3	(Denmark) Peter Møller	(Denmark) Brøndby	6
3	(Cyprus) Andreas Sotiriou	(Cyprus) APOEL	6
5	(Colombia) Faustino Asprilla	(England) Newcastle United	5
5	(Austria) Herfried Sabitzer	(Austria) GAK	5
5	(Belgium) Marc Wilmots	(Germany) Schalke 04	5
8	(Cyprus) Alexis Alexandrou	(Cyprus) APOEL	4
8	(Brazil) Sonny Anderson	(France) Monaco	4
8	(Georgia (country)) Shota Arveladze	(Turkey) Trabzonspor	4
8	(Norway) Runar Berg	(Norway) Bodø/Glimt	4
8	(Croatia) Igor Cvitanović	Croatia Zagreb	4
8	(Scotland) Billy Dodds	(Scotland) Aberdeen	4
8	(England) Les Ferdinand	(England) Newcastle United	4
8	(Spain) Juanele	(Spain) Tenerife	4
8	(Turkey) Hami Mandıralı	(Turkey) Trabzonspor	4
8	(Poland) Marcin Mięciel	(Poland) Legia Warsaw	4
8	(Turkey) Oktay Derelioğlu	(Turkey) Beşiktaş	4
8	(Denmark) Michael Schjønberg	(Denmark) Odense	4
8	(Australia) Josip Skoko	(Croatia) Hajduk Split	4
8	(Russia) Andrey Tikhonov	(Russia) Spartak Moscow	4

== See also ==
- 1996–97 UEFA Champions League
- 1996–97 UEFA Cup Winners' Cup
- 1996 UEFA Intertoto Cup
