= Moses Molongo =

Cameroonian associated football player

Personal information
- Full name: Moses Esingila Molongo
- Date of birth: 14 June 1979 (age 47)
- Place of birth: Limbé, Cameroon
- Height: 1.86 m (6 ft 1 in)
- Position: Forward

Senior career*
Years	Team	Apps	(Gls)
1996–1997	Victoria United		
1997–2000	Zagłębie Lubin	59	(13)
2000–2001	Dolcan Ząbki		
2002	Volyn Lutsk	1	(0)
2003	Vorskla Poltava	16	(3)
2003	Slovan Bratislava	2	(0)
2004	SFC Opava	0	(0)
2005	Rega Trzebiatów		
2005	Zakarpattia Uzhhorod	0	(0)
2006	Stal Mielec		
2007	Cwmbrân Town	5	(3)
2008	Rega-Merida Trzebiatów	14	(1)
2009	Sława Sławno	14	(5)
2009–2010	Pogoń Barlinek		
2012	Noteć Czarnków		
- * Club domestic league appearances and goals

Moses Esingila Molongo (born 14 June 1979) is a Cameroonian former professional footballer who played as a forward. He began his career with Victoria United before starting his international career.

== Career ==
=== Russia ===
Sighted at SKA-Khabarovsk's camp in China preceding the 2002–03 season, Molongo ended up not impressing.

=== Ukraine ===
Chipping in with two goals in three friendlies while at Vorskla Poltava's camp, and earning the praise of Vitaliy Kvartsyanyi, he officially became part of their squad leading up to spring 2003.

=== Poland ===
Donning the colours of Rega Trzebiatów in 2005, the Cameroonian left later that year. The former Zagłębie Lubin man then spent 2006 with Stal Mielec and returned to Rega in early 2008, after a short stint with Welsh side Cwmbrân Town. In 2009, he moved to Sława Sławno, before joining Pogoń Barlinek and Noteć Czarnków.
