= Stolarz =

Stolarz or Stolorz is a Polish surname. It is a surname derived from the occupation of stolarz, a joiner, literally "table-maker". A stolarz in Polish is a name of a profession, in English it is carpenter. The surname may refer to:

- Anthony Stolarz (born 1994), American professional ice hockey goaltender
- Laurie Faria Stolarz, American author of young adult fiction novels,
- Matthew Stolarz, a musician from band The Active Set
- Michał Stolarz, Polish football midfielder
- Justyna Stolarz, Polish costume designer, recipient of several film awards, such as Polish Academy Award for Best Costume Design
- Bruno Stolorz (born 1955), German rugby coach
