= Serhiy Shipovskiy =

Ukrainian footballer

Personal information
- Full name: Serhiy Volodymyrovych Shypovskyi
- Date of birth: 2 January 1965 (age 61)
- Height: 1.82 m (6 ft 0 in)
- Position: Goalkeeper

Senior career*
| Years | Team | Apps | (Gls) |
| 1981–1983 | Zenit Izhevsk | | |
| 1984–1985 | Gastello Ufa | 25 | (0) |
| 1985 | → Krylia Sovetov Samara (loan) | 27 | (0) |
| 1986–1987 | Karpaty Lviv | 29 | (0) |
| 1988–1990 | Shakhtar Donetsk | 22 | (0) |
| 1991 | Tekstilshchik Kamyshin | 11 | (0) |
| 1991–1997 | Hutnik Kraków | 152 | (0) |
| 1997–1999 | Gazovik Gazprom Izhevsk | | |
| 2000–2002 | Pogoń Szczecin | 14 | (0) |

Managerial career
- 2003–2004: GKS Katowice (goalkeeping coach)
- 2005: Polonia Warsaw (goalkeeping coach)
- 2007: Rega Trzebiatów
- 2007–2008: Gryf Kamień Pomorski
- 2010–2011: Pogoń Szczecin (goalkeeping coach)
- 2012–2013: Flota Świnoujście (goalkeeping coach)
- * Club domestic league appearances and goals

Serhiy Shypovskyi (born 2 January 1965) is a Russian former professional footballer who played as a goalkeeper.
