= Konstantin Ivanov =

Konstantin Ivanov may refer to:

- Konstantin Ivanov (footballer, born 1964)
- Konstantin Ivanov (poet) (1890-1915), Chuvash poet
- Konstantin Ivanov (conductor) (1907–1984), Russian conductor
