= Adrian Mierzejewski =

Polish footballer (born 1986)

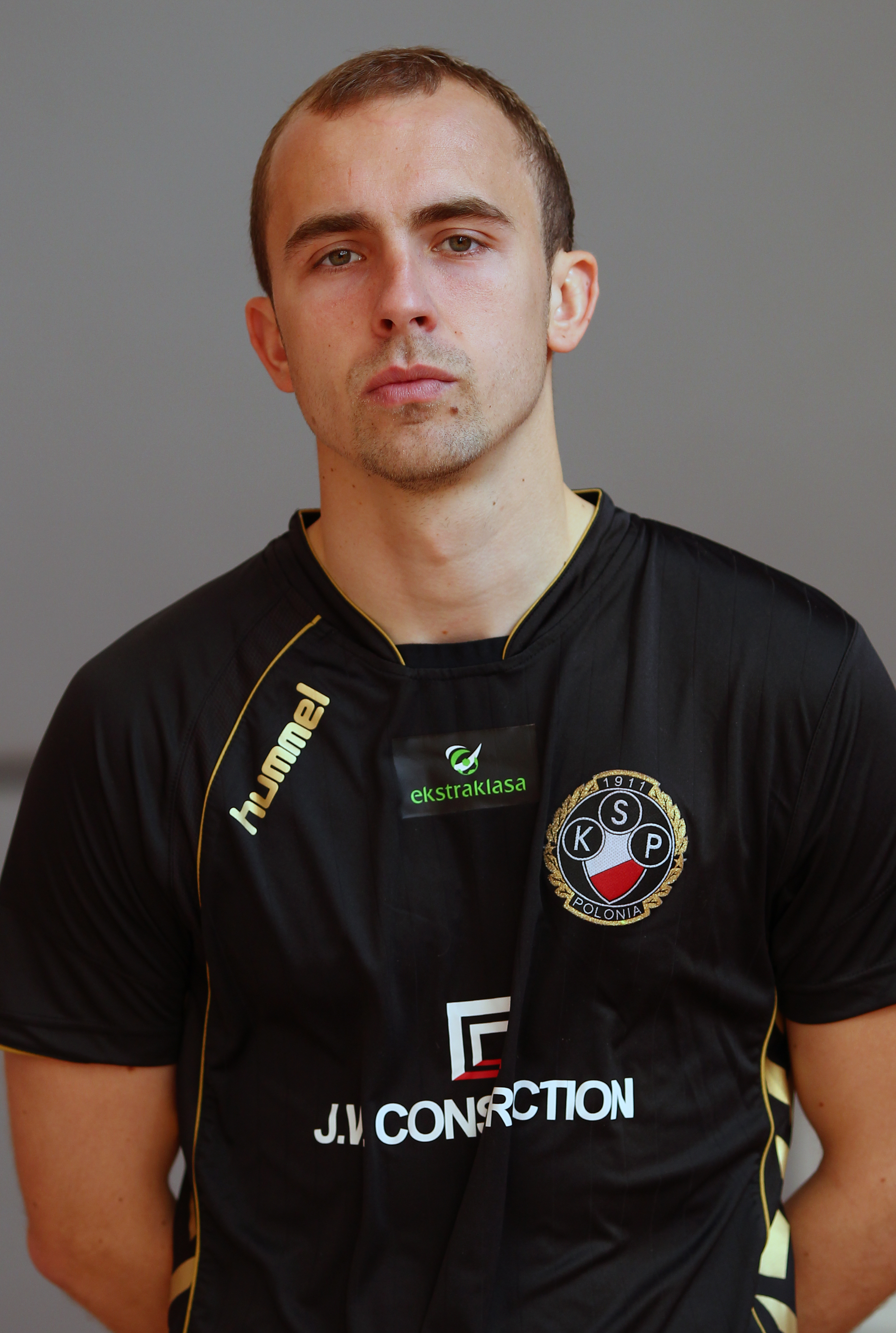
- Mierzejewski with Polonia Warsaw in 2011

Personal information
- Full name: Adrian Mierzejewski
- Date of birth: 6 November 1986 (age 40)
- Place of birth: Olsztyn, Poland
- Height: 1.76 m (5 ft 9 in)
- Position: Midfielder

Team information
- Current team: Poland (technical director)

Youth career
- Tempo 25 Olsztyn
- Naki Olsztyn
- Stomil Olsztyn

Senior career*
Years	Team	Apps	(Gls)
2002–2003	Stomil Olsztyn	3	(0)
2004–2009	Wisła Płock	72	(9)
2006–2007	→ Zagłębie Sosnowiec (loan)	14	(1)
2009–2011	Polonia Warsaw	69	(11)
2011–2014	Trabzonspor	84	(9)
2014–2016	Al-Nassr	43	(18)
2016–2017	Al-Sharjah	19	(3)
2017–2018	Sydney FC	25	(13)
2018–2019	Changchun Yatai	19	(3)
2019–2021	Chongqing Lifan	39	(10)
2020	→ Guangzhou R&F (loan)	6	(2)
2021	→ Shanghai Shenhua (loan)	16	(5)
2022–2023	Henan FC	51	(8)
Total		460	(92)

International career
2006	Poland U20	1	(0)
2005–2007	Poland U21	3	(0)
2010–2013	Poland	41	(3)
- * Club domestic league appearances and goals

Adrian Mierzejewski (Polish pronunciation: [ˈadrjan mjɛʐɛˈjɛfskʲi]; born 6 November 1986) is a Polish former professional footballer who played as a midfielder. He is currently the technical director of the Poland national team.

== Club career ==
=== Early career ===
Born in Olsztyn, Mierzejewski began his career at local side Tempo 25 Olsztyn, then he moved to Naki Olsztyn.

On 31 May 2003, aged 16, he made his II liga debut for Stomil Olsztyn in a game against Świt Nowy Dwór Mazowiecki, coming on as a substitute for Marcin Kubsik in 79th minute. He ended the 2002–03 season having made three league appearances, all as a substitute. After the season, he returned to Naki Olsztyn.

=== Wisła Płock ===
In 2004 Mierzejewski signed a five-year contract with Wisła Płock for a fee of 15 000 złotys. He made his Ekstraklasa debut on 15 May 2004 in a match against Dyskobolia Grodzisk Wielkopolski, when he came on as a substitution for Dariusz Romuzga 86th. He made his first league on start on 8 June 2004 in a 1–1 draw with GKS Katowice. Mierzejewski played 45 minutes and was replaced by Klaudiusz Ząbecki. He ended the 2003–04 season with three league appearances.

On 10 November 2004 he scored his first goal for Wisła in a 5–1 win over Kujawiak Włocławek in the Polish Cup. On 1 May 2005 Mierzejewski scored his first Ekstraklasa goal in a game against Górnik Łęczna which Wisła lost 2–3. Mierzejewski ended the 2004–05 season with 18 appearances and four goals in all competitions.

On 11 August 2005 he made his debut in European competition playing in a UEFA Cup second qualifying round match against Grasshopper. Mierzejewski ended the 2005–06 season with 27 appearances and two goals in all competitions. He also won the Polish Cup with Wisła. However, he didn't play in the final.

After six appearances for Wisła in the 2006–07 season, on 23 February 2007 he was loaned for six months to Zagłębie Sosnowiec. He made his debut for Zagłębie on 10 March in a league game against Piast Gliwice and a month later in a 3–0 victory over Kmita Zabierzów he scored his first goal for a new club. He ended the season with 20 appearances and one goal in all competitions. Zagłębie was promoted to Ekstraklasa, but Wisła was relegated.

In the 2007–08 season Mierzejewski made 19 appearances and scored two goals in all competitions. In the autumn round of the following season he scored eight goals in 20 matches including a hat-trick in an 8–0 victory over ŁKS Łomża in the Polish Cup.

=== Polonia Warsaw ===
On 22 December 2008 Mierzejewski signed a three-year contract with Polonia Warsaw. He made his debut for Polonia on 27 February 2009 in the derby match against Legia Warsaw (0–0). In the following match, on 7 March, he scored his first goal, in an away game against Wisła Kraków which Polonia lost 1–2. Mierzejewski ended the 2008–09 season with 18 appearances and one goal for Polonia in all competitions. Also, he made one appearance for the Młoda Ekstraklasa team.

On 23 July 2009 he scored his first goal in a European competition in a 4–0 victory over Juveness/Dogana in the second qualifying round of the 2009–10 UEFA Europa League. In the 2009–10 season he was a first-team player. Overall, he made 36 appearances and scored three goals in this season. On 18 August 2010 he extended his contract with Polonia to 2013.

During his time at Polonia he emerged on the national stage winning the "Ekstraklasa player of the year award" in the 2010–11 season in which he also captained Polonia's team.

=== Trabzonspor ===
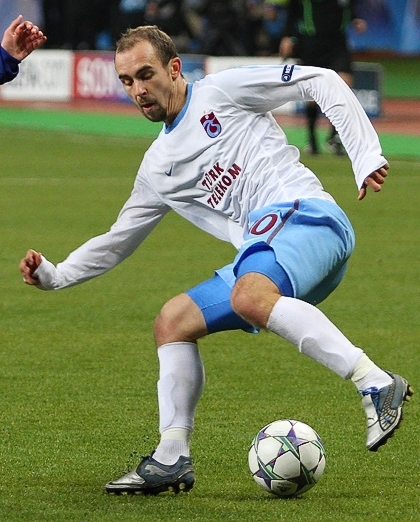
Mierzejewski with Trabzonspor in 2011.

He signed a 5-year contract with Trabzonspor on 16 June 2011. Trabzonspor paid 5.25 million euros for him, an all-time record for an Ekstraklasa player at that time.

=== Al Nassr FC ===
On 11 June 2014, Al-Nassr announced on their Twitter account the signing of Adrian Mierzejewski. However, the player didn't complete his transfer at that time as he was during the negotiations process with the Saudi Arabian team. It became official on 20 June 2014, when Mierzejewski signed a three-year contract with Al-Nassr for a €3.2 million fee.

Mierzejewski debuted in Saudi Super Cup match against Al Shabab, on 7 August 2014. He gave assist to Mohammad Al-Sahlawi who scored the first goal in Saudi Super Cup. He scored his first goal in league against Najran SC on 15 August 2014. Then he scored twice against Al Raed in 2nd week. On 13 September 2014, he scored a goal for Al-Nassr in MatchDay 4 against former champion Al Fateh.

In 2015 AFC Champions League, he scored his 1st goal against Iranian side Persepolis. With Al-Nassr, he played in all the six group stage matches, scoring just 2 goals and failed to qualify for the Round of 16.

On 10 May 2015, Adrian helped Al-Nassr win their 2nd consecutive league title. He played 25 games in 2014–15 Saudi Professional League, scoring 8 goals. He is the 2nd top scorer of Al-Nassr in league.

=== Sydney FC ===
On 12 August 2017, Mierzejewski signed a three-year deal with A-League champions Sydney FC.

Mierzejewski made his debut and scored his first goal for Sydney FC in the 3–0 2017 FFA Cup win over Bankstown Berries, dispatching a penalty in 90+1. The Pole scored his first league goal from the penalty spot as well, in a 2–0 win against Perth Glory at Allianz Stadium.

In the 2017 FFA Cup Final, Mierzejewski won the Mark Viduka Medal for Man of the Match, as the Sky Blues beat Adelaide United 2–1 AET. This good form continued, with Mierzejewski scoring 2 goals for Sydney in the Sydney Derby record 5–0 win. He was instrumental to the game, being named the Man of the Match. On 29 April 2017, Mierzejewski has taken out the 2017/18 Johnny Warren medal for best player in the A-League finished 11 points clear of Dimitri Petratos and Leroy George.

=== Changchun Yatai ===
On 8 July 2018, Mierzejewski transferred to Chinese Super League side Changchun Yatai.

=== Chongqing Lifan ===
On 13 February 2019, Mierzejewski transferred to fellow Super League side Chongqing Lifan.

On 28 September 2020, Mierzejewski joined Guangzhou R&F on loan.

On 14 March 2021, Mierzejewski joined Shanghai Shenhua on loan.

=== Henan FC ===
On 28 April 2022, Mierzejewski signed with fellow Chinese Super League club Henan Songshan Longmen. On 24 October 2023, he announced that would leave the club at the expiration of his contract at the end of the 2023 season.

On 27 January 2024, Mierzejewski announced his retirement from football, aged 37.

== International career ==
Mierzejewski played for U18, U19, U20 and U21 national teams.

On 29 May 2010 he debuted for the national team of Poland in a friendly match against Finland.

On 5 June 2011, he scored his first goal for the national team, giving his team a 1–0 lead in a friendly match against Argentina. The match ended with a 2–1 victory for Poland.

== Post-playing career ==
After retirement, Mierzejewski obtained an UEFA A coaching license and completed a sporting director course organized by the Polish Football Association. On 17 July 2025, he was hired as the technical director of the Poland national team.

== Career statistics ==
=== Club ===
Appearances and goals by club, season and competition
Club	Season	League			National cup (Note: Includes Polish Cup, Turkish Cup, King's Cup, UAE President's Cup, Australia Cup, Chinese FA Cup)		League cup (Note: Includes Ekstraklasa Cup, Saudi Crown Prince Cup, UAE League Cup)		Continental		Other		Total	
Club	Season	Division	Apps	Goals	Apps	Goals	Apps	Goals	Apps	Goals	Apps	Goals	Apps	Goals
Stomil Olsztyn	2002–03	II liga	3	0	0	0	—		—		—		3	0
Wisła Płock	2003–04	Ekstraklasa	3	0	0	0	—		—		—		3	0
Wisła Płock	2004–05	Ekstraklasa	11	1	7	3	—		—		—		18	4
Wisła Płock	2005–06	Ekstraklasa	20	1	5	1	—		2 (Note: Appearances in UEFA Cup/UEFA Europa League)	0	—		27	2
Wisła Płock	2006–07	Ekstraklasa	3	0	0	0	3	0	—		—		6	0
Wisła Płock	2007–08	II liga	17	2	2	0	—		—		—		19	2
Wisła Płock	2008–09	I liga	18	5	2	3	—		—		—		20	8
Wisła Płock	Total		72	9	16	7	3	0	2	0	—		93	16
Zagłębie Sosnowiec (loan)	2006–07	II liga	14	1	0	0	—		—		—		14	1
Polonia Warsaw	2008–09	Ekstraklasa	12	2	4	0	2	1	—		—		18	3
Polonia Warsaw	2009–10	Ekstraklasa	30	2	0	0	—		6	1	—		36	3
Polonia Warsaw	2010–11	Ekstraklasa	27	7	4	1	—		—		—		31	8
Polonia Warsaw	Total		69	11	8	1	2	1	6	1	—		85	14
Trabzonspor	2011–12	Süper Lig	33	0	2	0	—		8 (Note: Two appearances in UEFA Champions League, six appearances in UEFA Europa League)	0	—		43	0
Trabzonspor	2012–13	Süper Lig	21	5	8	8	—		0	0	—		29	13
Trabzonspor	2013–14	Süper Lig	27	4	1	0	—		12	3	—		40	7
Trabzonspor	Total		84	9	11	8	—		20	3	0	0	115	20
Al-Nassr	2014–15	Saudi Pro League	24	8	3	1	3	0	6 (Note: Appearances in AFC Champions League)	2	1 (Note: Appearance in Saudi Super Cup)	0	37	11
Al-Nassr	2015–16	Saudi Pro League	19	10	3	0	2	1	6	1	1	0	31	12
Al-Nassr	Total		43	18	6	1	5	1	12	3	2	0	68	23
Al-Sharjah	2016–17	UAE Arabian Gulf League	19	3	0	0	6	5	—		—		25	8
Sydney FC	2017–18	A-League	25	13	3	1	—		6	1	—		34	15
Changchun Yatai	2018	Chinese Super League	19	3	0	0	—		—		—		19	3
Chongqing Lifan	2019	Chinese Super League	28	4	0	0	—		—		—		28	4
Chongqing Lifan	2020	Chinese Super League	11	6	0	0	—		—		—		11	6
Chongqing Lifan	Total		39	10	0	0	—		—		—		39	10
Guangzhou R&F (loan)	2020	Chinese Super League	6	2	0	0	—		—		—		6	2
Shanghai Shenhua (loan)	2021	Chinese Super League	16	5	4	0	—		—		—		20	5
Henan FC	2022	Chinese Super League	29	6	0	0	—		—		—		29	6
Henan FC	2023	Chinese Super League	22	2	1	1	—		—		—		23	3
Henan FC	Total		51	8	1	1	—		—		—		52	9
Career total			460	92	49	19	16	7	46	8	2	0	573	126

=== International ===
Appearances and goals by national team and year
National team	Year	Apps	Goals
Poland	2010	8	0
Poland	2011	11	1
Poland	2012	12	1
Poland	2013	10	1
Total		41	3

Scores and results list Poland's goal tally first, score column indicates score after each Mierzejewski goal.

List of international goals scored by Adrian Mierzejewski
No.	Date	Venue	Opponent	Score	Result	Competition
1	5 June 2011	Polish Army Stadium, Warsaw	Argentina	1–0	2–1	Friendly
2	7 September 2012	Podgorica City Stadium, Podgorica	Montenegro	2–2	2–2	2014 FIFA World Cup qualification
3	10 September 2013	Stadio Olimpico, Serravalle	San Marino	5–1	5–1	2014 FIFA World Cup qualification

== Personal life ==
On 11 June 2011 Mierzejewski married his girlfriend Małgorzata. The couple started dating when they were both attending V Liceum Ogólnokształcące in Olsztyn.

== Honours ==
Wisła Płock

- Polish Cup: 2005–06

Al-Nassr

- Saudi Pro League: 2014–15

Sydney FC

- A-League Premiership: 2017–18
- FFA Cup: 2017

Individual

- Ekstraklasa Player of the Season: 2010–11
- Ekstraklasa Player of the Year: 2010
- Saudi Professional League Player of the Month: August 2014
- Mark Viduka Medal: 2017
- A-League Player of the Month: December 2017, February 2018
- Johnny Warren Medal: 2017–18
- Alex Tobin Medal: 2017–18
- A-League Team of the Season: 2017–18
