= Bartłomiej Jamróz =

Polish footballer (born 1973)

Personal information
- Date of birth: 15 December 1973 (age 52)
- Place of birth: Kraków, Poland
- Height: 1.93 m (6 ft 4 in)
- Position: Defender

Youth career
- Krakus Nowa Huta
- Garbarnia Kraków

Senior career*
Years	Team	Apps	(Gls)
1991–1992	Garbarnia Kraków		
1992–1994	Wisła Kraków	28	(3)
1994–1998	Hutnik Kraków		
1998–2003	Ruch Chorzów	121	(15)
2003–2004	Górnik Polkowice	21	(1)
2004–2005	Alki Larnaca	17	(4)
2005–2006	APOEL	4	(0)
2006–2007	Garbarnia Kraków		
- * Club domestic league appearances and goals

Bartłomiej Jamróz (born 15 December 1973) is a Polish former professional footballer who played as a defender.
