= Zbigniew Płaszewski =

Polish footballer

Personal information
- Date of birth: 18 August 1951 (age 75)
- Place of birth: Kraków, Poland
- Height: 1.80 m (5 ft 11 in)
- Position: Defender

Senior career*
Years	Team	Apps	(Gls)
1964–1975	Hutnik Kraków		
1975–1981	Wisła Kraków		

International career
1976–1980	Poland	5	(0)
- * Club domestic league appearances and goals

Zbigniew Płaszewski (born 18 August 1951) is a Polish former footballer who played as a defender.

He played in five matches for the Poland national team from 1976 to 1980.

== Honours ==
Wisła Kraków

- Ekstraklasa: 1977–78
