= Krystian Bracik =

Polish footballer (born 2001)

Personal information
- Full name: Krystian Bracik
- Date of birth: 18 March 2001 (age 25)
- Place of birth: Starachowice, Poland
- Height: 1.84 m (6 ft 0 in)
- Position: Defender

Team information
- Current team: Hutnik Kraków
- Number: 14

Youth career
- Sokół Starachowice
- 2013–2018: Juventa Starachowice
- 2018–2019: Cracovia

Senior career*
Years	Team	Apps	(Gls)
2019–2023	Cracovia II	88	(7)
2021–2023	Cracovia	1	(0)
2022	→ Wisła Puławy (loan)	14	(1)
2023–2024	Star Starachowice	32	(0)
2024–2025	Siarka Tarnobrzeg	29	(5)
2025–	Hutnik Kraków	26	(0)
- * Club domestic league appearances and goals as of 19:05, 31 May 2026 (UTC)

Krystian Bracik (born 18 March 2001) is a Polish professional footballer who plays as a defender for II liga club Hutnik Kraków.

== Honours ==
Cracovia II

- IV liga Lesser Poland West: 2019–20

Star Starachowice

- Polish Cup (Świętokrzyskie regionals): 2023–24

Siarka Tarnobrzeg

- Polish Cup (Subcarpathia regionals): 2024–25
- Polish Cup (Stalowa Wola regionals): 2024–25
