= Moussa Yahaya =

Nigerien footballer (born 1975)

Personal information
- Date of birth: 4 January 1975 (age 51)
- Place of birth: Agadez, Niger
- Height: 1.83 m (6 ft 0 in)
- Position: Forward

Senior career*
Years	Team	Apps	(Gls)
- Aigles FC
–1993	Olympic FC de Niamey		
1993–1996	JS du Ténéré		
1996	→ Sokół Tychy (loan)	13	(5)
1996	Hutnik Kraków	13	(2)
1997–1999	Albacete	71	(12)
2000	Trikala	14	(5)
2000–2001	GKS Katowice	17	(6)
2001–2002	Legia Warsaw	19	(2)
2003	GKS Katowice	15	(2)
2006	Rega-Merida Trzebiatów		
2007	Mazur Karczew	7	(1)

International career
1992–1998	Niger	16	(4)
- * Club domestic league appearances and goals

Moussa Yahaya (born 4 January 1975) is a Nigerien retired professional footballer who played as a striker. He represented the Niger national team on sixteen occasions.

== Football career ==
Born in Agadez, Yahaya began playing with JS du Ténéré. In 1995, he started an abroad adventure that would last more than a decade, first with Sokół Tychy then with Hutnik Kraków – he spent most of his career in Poland, amassing Ekstraklasa totals of 77 games and 17 goals over the course of six seasons.

After two-and-a-half years with relative impact with Segunda División side Albacete Balompié, scoring 13 times from 72 competitive matches, and a brief spell with Greek club Trikala FC, Yahaya returned to Poland, representing GKS Katowice in 2001 and 2003, as well as Legia Warsaw from 2001 to 2002. From 2006 onwards, he played in Polish lower divisions, starting with Rega-Merida Trzebiatów, before joining Mazur Karczew in 2007.

Yahaya was also a full Nigerien international in the 90s.

== Honours ==
Legia Warsaw

- Ekstraklasa: 2001–02
- Polish League Cup: 2001–02
