= Robert Ziółkowski =

Polish footballer

Personal information
- Date of birth: 10 March 1976 (age 50)
- Place of birth: Kraków, Poland
- Position: Defender

Senior career*
Years	Team	Apps	(Gls)
1993–1998	Hutnik Kraków		
1999–2003	KS Cracovia		
2003–2005	Górnik Wieliczka		
2005	Victoria Jaworzno		
2006	Garbarnia Kraków		
2007–2010	Zjednoczeni Branice		
2010–2011	Drwinka Drwinia		
2011–2012	Prokocim Kraków		
2012	Zjednoczeni Branice		
- * Club domestic league appearances and goals

Robert Ziółkowski (born 10 March 1976) is a Polish former professional footballer who played as a defender.
