= Stojadin Rajković =

Serbian footballer and manager

Personal information
- Date of birth: 26 May 1963 (age 63)
- Position: Defender

Senior career*
Years	Team	Apps	(Gls)
- Rad
1989–1990	Flavia Solva	24	(0)
1990–1997	Grazer AK	204	(11)
1997–1998	Hartberg	25	(0)
1998–2000	Kapfenberger SV		

Managerial career
- 2007–2008: Grazer AK (assistant)
- 2008: Grazer AK
- 2011–2012: Pachern (assistant)
- 2012–2013: Sturm Graz (assistant)
- 2013: Sturm Graz II
- 2021: Gleinstätten
- * Club domestic league appearances and goals

Stojadin Rajković (born 26 May 1963) is a Serbian retired football defender and later manager.
