= Michał Stolarz =

Polish footballer

Personal information
- Date of birth: 2 February 1977 (age 49)
- Place of birth: Kraków
- Position: Midfielder

Senior career*
Years	Team	Apps	(Gls)
1994–1999	Hutnik Kraków		
1999	Stomil Olsztyn		
2000–2002	Śląsk Wrocław		
2002	Pogoń Szczecin		
2003	ŁKS Łódź		
2003	Stal Głowno		
2004	Piast Gliwice		
2005–2006	Hutnik Kraków		
2006–2007	Kmita Zabierzow		
- * Club domestic league appearances and goals

Michał Stolarz (born 2 February 1977) is a retired Polish football midfielder.
