= Costas Stavrou =

Cypriot footballer (born 1965)

Personal information
- Date of birth: 20 January 1965 (age 61)
- Position: Defender

Senior career*
Years	Team	Apps	(Gls)
1992–1993	Ethnikos Achna FC		
1993–1998	Anorthosis Famagusta FC		
1998–2000	APOEL FC		

International career
1996	Cyprus	4	(0)
- * Club domestic league appearances and goals

Costas Stavrou (born 20 January 1965) is a retired Cypriot football defender.
