= Jan Sønksen =

Danish footballer (born 1973)

Personal information
- Date of birth: 10 April 1973 (age 53)
- Place of birth: Odense
- Position: Defender

Senior career*
Years	Team	Apps	(Gls)
1991–1992	Odense BK		
1994–1996	Ikast FS		
1996–1998	Silkeborg IF		
1998–2002	Vejle BK		
2002–2006	Odense BK		
- * Club domestic league appearances and goals

Jan Sønksen (born 10 April 1973) is a Danish retired football defender.

== Honours ==
Silkeborg

- UEFA Intertoto Cup: 1996
