= Dave O'Gorman =

English footballer

Personal information
- Full name: David O'Gorman
- Date of birth: 20 June 1972 (age 54)
- Place of birth: Chester, England
- Height: 1.83 m (6 ft 0 in)
- Position: Winger

Youth career
- Wrexham

Senior career*
Years	Team	Apps	(Gls)
1989–1990	Wrexham		
1991	Northwich Victoria		
1991–1992	Hyde United	22	(11)
1992–1995	Connah's Quay Nomads		
1995–1997	Barry Town United		
1997–1998	Swansea City	39	(5)
1999	Connah's Quay Nomads		
1999–2000	Hellenic		
2001–2002	Rhyl		
- * Club domestic league appearances and goals as of 22:07, 25 February 2018 (UTC)

David O'Gorman (born 20 June 1972) is an English former footballer, who played as a winger. He made appearances in the English football league for Welsh club Swansea City.

== Career ==
O'Gorman's first club was Wrexham, where he spent 17 months at as a professional after rising through the youth team before moving to Northwich Victoria.

He would then move between various clubs in the English and Welsh leagues, winning the League of Wales with Barry Town United in the 1996–97 season before being signed by Football League Third Division club Swansea City, for who he made 39 league appearances.

In his later career, he would have a spell at South African club Hellenic before returning to the U.K. to end his career at Rhyl.

== Honours ==
Barry Town United

- League Of Wales: 1996–97
