= Dănuț Moisescu =

Romanian footballer

Personal information
- Date of birth: 22 March 1972 (age 54)
- Place of birth: Constanța, Romania
- Position: Midfielder

Senior career*
| Years | Team | Apps | (Gls) |
| 1989–1992 | Farul Constanța | 55 | (6) |
| 1992–1993 | Universitatea Craiova | 25 | (2) |
| 1993–1994 | Hapoel Tel Aviv | 11 | (0) |
| 1994 | Hapoel Be'er Sheva | | |
| 1995 | Dinamo București | 17 | (1) |
| 1995 | Farul Constanța | 2 | (0) |
| 1995–1997 | National București | 61 | (2) |
| 1997 | Altay | 2 | (0) |
| 1998–1999 | National București | 26 | (1) |
| Total | | 199 | (15) |

International career
| 1993 | Romania | 4 | (0) |
- * Club domestic league appearances and goals

Dănuț Moisescu (born 22 March 1972) is a Romanian former professional footballer who played as a midfielder.

== International career ==
Moisescu played four friendly games for Romania, making his debut under coach Cornel Dinu who sent him on the field in order to replace Gheorghe Mihali in the 48th minute of a 3–0 loss against Ecuador.

== Honours ==
Universitatea Craiova

- Cupa României: 1992–93
