= Alexis Alexandrou =

Cypriot footballer (born 1973)

Personal information
- Full name: Alexandros Alexandrou
- Date of birth: 12 July 1973 (age 53)
- Position: Forward

Senior career*
Years	Team	Apps	(Gls)
1995–1998	APOEL FC		
1999–2002	Ethnikos Achna FC		

International career
1996–1997	Cyprus	3	(0)
- * Club domestic league appearances and goals

Alexis Alexandrou (born 12 July 1973) is a retired Cypriot football striker.
