= Erwin Dampfhofer =

Austrian footballer

Personal information
- Date of birth: 30 August 1966 (age 60)
- Place of birth: Graz, Austria
- Height: 1.85 m (6 ft 1 in)
- Position: Forward

Senior career*
Years	Team	Apps	(Gls)
–1990	LUV Graz		
1990–1997	Grazer AK	13	(1)
1995–1996	→ SV Ried (loan)	36	(8)
1997	Wiener Sport-Club	10	(6)
1997–2001	DSV Leoben	86	(11)
- * Club domestic league appearances and goals

Erwin Dampfhofer (born 30 August 1966) is a former Austrian footballer who played as a forward.
