= Didier Lang =

French footballer (born 1970)

Personal information
- Full name: Didier Lang
- Date of birth: 15 December 1970 (age 55)
- Place of birth: Metz
- Position: Defender

Senior career*
Years	Team	Apps	(Gls)
1989–1997	FC Metz		
1997–1998	Sporting CP		
1998–1999	FC Sochaux-Montbéliard		
1999–2000	Troyes AC		
2000–2001	FC Metz		
2001–2002	Le Mans UC 72		
2002–2003	Le Mans II		
2003–2005	CSO Amnéville		
- * Club domestic league appearances and goals

Didier Lang (born 15 December 1970) is a retired French football defender.
