= Zoran Cilinšek =

Serbian footballer

Personal information
- Full name: Zoran Cilinšek
- Date of birth: 20 March 1976 (age 50)
- Place of birth: Bečej, SFR Yugoslavia
- Height: 1.79 m (5 ft 10 1/2 in)
- Position: Midfielder

Senior career*
Years	Team	Apps	(Gls)
1994–1996	Bečej	41	(4)
1995–1999	Vojvodina	78	(10)
1999–2000	Charleroi	20	(1)
2000–2001	→ Vojvodina (loan)	18	(1)
2001–2002	→ Olimpija Ljubljana (loan)	0	(0)
2002–2003	ČSK Čelarevo	26	(2)
2003–2004	Budućnost Banatski Dvor	14	(0)
2004–2005	Kabel		
2006	Qarabağ	7	(0)
2006	Sloven Ruma		
2007	Slavija Sarajevo	13	(1)
2007–2008	Sloven Ruma	7	(0)
2008	→ Radnički Irig (loan)		
2008–2009	Cement Beočin		
- * Club domestic league appearances and goals

Zoran Cilinšek (Serbian Cyrillic: Зоран Цилиншек; born 20 March 1976) is a Serbian retired footballer.

== External sources ==
- Profile at Srbijafudbal
- Profile and stats until 2003 at Dekisa.Tripod
