= Herbert Wieger =

Austrian footballer

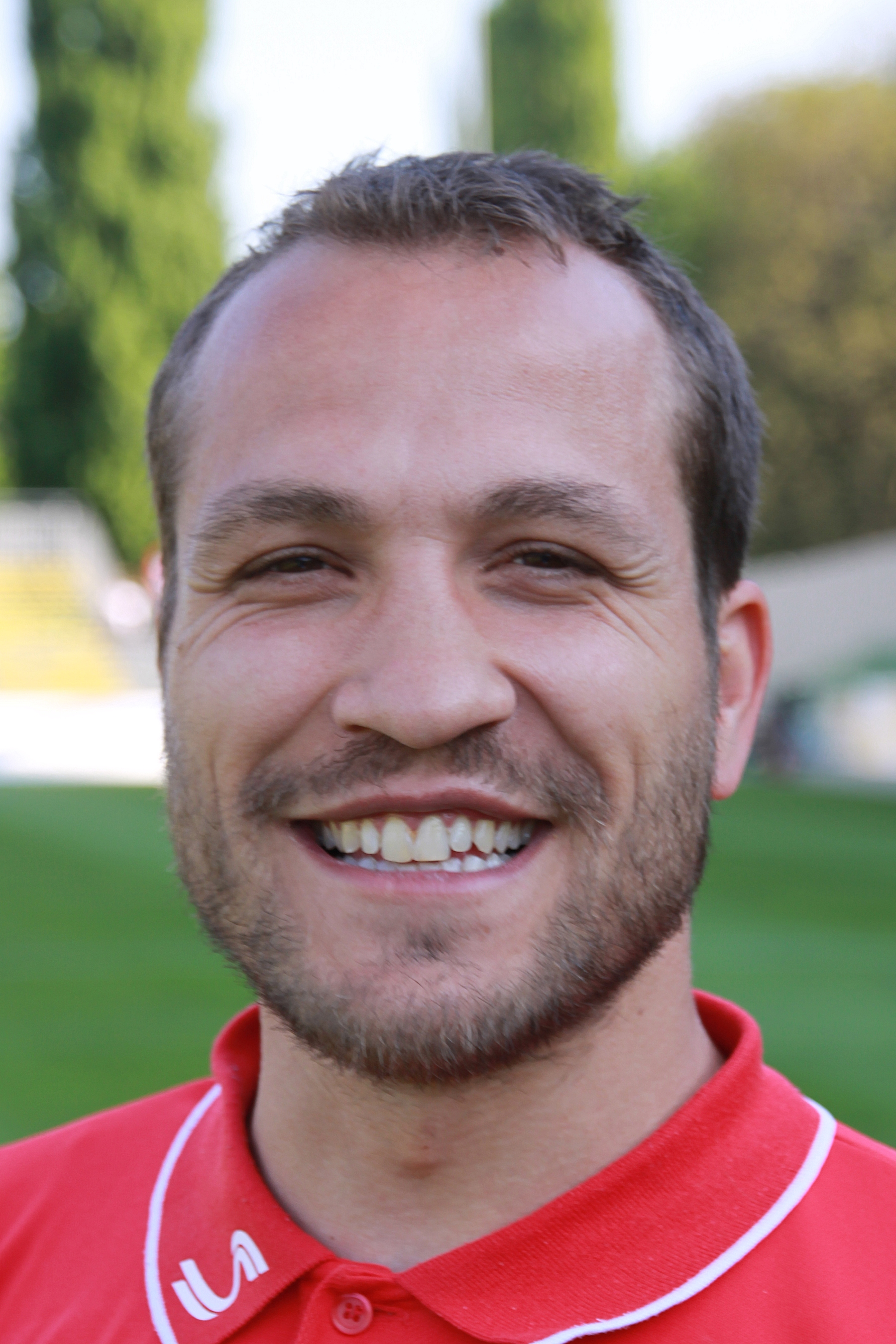

Personal information
- Full name: Herbert Wieger
- Date of birth: 7 February 1972 (age 54)
- Place of birth: Linz, Austria
- Height: 1.71 m (5 ft 7 1/2 in)
- Position: Striker

Senior career*
| Years | Team | Apps | (Gls) |
| 1990–1991 | Vorwarts Steyr | 8 | (0) |
| 1991–1994 | First Vienna | | |
| 1994–1999 | Grazer AK | 126 | (25) |
| 1999 | FC Kärnten | 0 | (0) |
| 1999–2000 | Admira Wacker Modling | 29 | (12) |
| 2000–2001 | Grazer AK | 9 | (0) |
| 2001–2002 | → Admira Wacker Modling (loan) | 16 | (1) |
| 2002–2011 | Kapfenberger SV | 189 | (41) |
| Total | | 377 | (79) |
- * Club domestic league appearances and goals

Herbert Wieger (born 7 February 1972) is an Austrian former professional association football player. He played as a striker.
