= Konstantin Ivanov (footballer, born 1964) =

Russian footballer

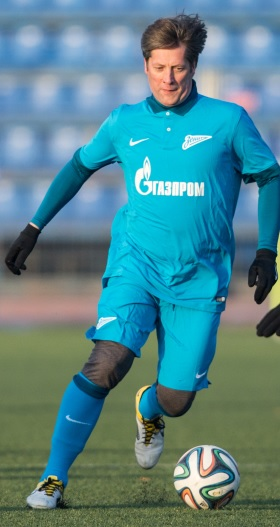
- Ivanov playing for FC Zenit veterans in 2014

Personal information
- Full name: Konstantin Aleksandrovich Ivanov
- Date of birth: 10 May 1964 (age 62)
- Place of birth: Vysokoklyuchevoy, Russian SFSR
- Height: 1.78 m (5 ft 10 in)
- Position: Midfielder

Senior career*
Years	Team	Apps	(Gls)
1984–1989	FC Zenit Leningrad	52	(1)
1985	→ SK Tallinna Sport	20	(2)
1991	FC Kirovets Saint Petersburg	14	(0)
1992–1993	FC Lokomotiv Saint Petersburg	34	(0)
1993	FC Zenit Saint Petersburg	4	(0)
1994–1995	FC Saturn-1991 Saint Petersburg	21	(1)
1996	Skonto FC	6	(0)
1997–1999	FC Dynamo Saint Petersburg	53	(0)
1999–2000	FC Kristall Smolensk	18	(3)
2000	FC Dynamo-Stroyimpuls Saint Petersburg (amateur)		
2001	FC Dynamo Saint Petersburg	7	(0)
- * Club domestic league appearances and goals

Konstantin Aleksandrovich Ivanov (Russian: Константин Александрович Иванов; born 10 May 1964) is a former Russian football midfielder.

== Club career ==
He played in 6 Soviet Top League seasons for FC Zenit Leningrad, but did not make any appearances for the main squad in 1984 when they won the league.
