= Dariusz Romuzga =

Polish footballer

Personal information
- Date of birth: 20 April 1971 (age 55)
- Place of birth: Kraków, Poland
- Height: 1.80 m (5 ft 11 in)
- Position: Midfielder

Senior career*
Years	Team	Apps	(Gls)
1988–1998	Hutnik Kraków		
1999–2006	Wisła Płock		
2007–2009	Kmita Zabierzów	66	(1)
- * Club domestic league appearances and goals

Dariusz Romuzga (born 20 April 1971) is a Polish former professional footballer who played as a midfielder.

From 1990 to 2006, he made 314 Ekstraklasa appearances, scoring 21 goals, for Hutnik Kraków and Wisła Płock. After retirement, he worked as an assistant coach at Sandecja Nowy Sącz and Puszcza Niepołomice.

== Honours ==
Wisła Płock

- Polish Cup: 2005–06
- Polish Super Cup: 2006
