= Rega Trzebiatów =

Polish football club

- Full name: Trzebiatowski Klub Sportowy; Rega Trzebiatów
- Founded: 1947; 78 years ago
- Ground: OSiR Stadium
- Capacity: 800
- Chairman: Piotr Dąbrowski
- Manager: Maciej Kiszkiel
- League: Regional league West Pomerania I
- 2023–24: Regional league West Pomerania I, 3rd of 16
Home colours	Away colours

TKS Rega Trzebiatów is a Polish football club based in Trzebiatów. As of the 2024–25 season, they compete in the West Pomerania I group of the regional league, the sixth level of Polish league system.

== History ==
The club's origins begin in 1947 as MLKS Rega Trzebiatów, however the club languished in the lower leagues throughout most of its history. In 2002, it was re-founded as a result of the merger of Rega Trzebiatów and Merida 1879, the latter of which got its name from the local army division. In the 2006–07 season, they played in the third division, its highest division to date. In 2008, the club was reformed under its historic pre-merger name Rega Trzebiatów. In the winter of the 2010–11 season, many key first team players left the team, its reserve team Rega Trzebiatów II was liquidated, and its players moved into the first squad to fill the void. After this, the club suffered multiple relegations until the 2014–15 season, when they won promotion back to the fifth tiet following a 7–1 win over derby rivals Sparta Gryfice.

== League history ==
Season	League	Position	Points	Goals	Comments
2002/03	IV liga (West Pomeranian group)	11	47	62-57	
2003/04	IV liga (West Pomeranian group)	11	50	56-46	
2004/05	IV liga (West Pomeranian group)	7	52	53-50	
2005/06	IV liga (West Pomeranian group)	1	75	97-34	promotion
2006/07	III liga (group 2)	9	42	34-35	
2007/08	III liga (group 2)	14	27	26-46	relegation
2008/09	III liga (Pomeranian-West Pomeranian group)	6	51	46-39	
2009/10	III liga (Pomeranian-West Pomeranian group)	2	58	50-27	
2010/11	III liga (Pomeranian-West Pomeranian group)	15	20	28-62	relegation
2011/12	IV liga (West Pomeranian group)	16	8	19-111	relegation
2012/13	Liga okręgowa	16	6	19-97	relegation
2013/14	Klasa A (northern Szczecin group)	7	44	47-48	
2014/15	Klasa A (northern Szczecin group)	1	72	96-31	promotion
2015/16	Liga okręgowa	5	55	61-44	
2016/17	Liga okręgowa	2	69	78-37	promotion
2017/18	IV liga, West Pomeranian group	6	52	74-68	
2018/19	IV liga West Pomeranian group	6	59	68-42	
2019/20	IV liga West Pomeranian group	11	26	27-30	
2020/21	IV liga West Pomeranian group	15	53	68-81	relegation
2021/22	Liga okręgowa, West Pomeranian Group I	2	74	92-33	lost promotion play-offs
2022/23	Liga okręgowa, West Pomeranian Group I	3	69	109-39	
2023/24	Liga okręgowa, West Pomeranian Group I	3	74	100-32	
