= Hutnik Kraków =

Polish football club

- Full name: Klub Sportowy Hutnik Kraków
- Nickname: Gumiory
- Founded: 21 March 1950; 76 years ago 2010; 16 years ago (re-founded)
- Ground: Suche Stawy Stadium
- Capacity: 6,500
- Chairman: Artur Trębacz
- Manager: Krzysztof Świątek
- League: II liga
- 2025–26: II liga, 11th of 18
- Website: https://hutnikkrakow.com
| Home colours | Away colours | Third colours |

Hutnik Kraków (Polish pronunciation: [ˈxutɲik ˈkrakuf]) is a Polish football club based in Nowa Huta, Kraków, currently competing in the II liga, the third tier of Polish football.

== History ==
The club was founded in 1950. Hutnik have played seven seasons in the Polish top-flight. The team's greatest success is a third place in the 1995–96 season, as a result of which they qualified for the UEFA Cup. In that tournament, Hutnik eliminated Khazri Buzovna from Azerbaijan (9–0 and 2–2), Czech side Sigma Olomouc (0–1 and 3–1), but were themselves eliminated by Monaco (0–1 and 1–3).

The team was dissolved due to its debts and refounded by its fans as Hutnik Nowa Huta in 2010. They were admitted to Polish fifth division.

The England national team trained at Hutnik's grounds for the Euro 2012 tournament.

Among most famous players who began their careers at Hutnik youth academy are Marcin Wasilewski, Zbigniew Płaszewski, Jan Karaś, Kazimierz Putek, Marek Koźmiński, Dariusz Romuzga, Łukasz Sosin and Michał Pazdan.

== Naming history ==
- 1952–56: Stal Nowa Huta
- 1956–84: Hutnik Nowa Huta
- 1984–2010: Hutnik Kraków
- 2010–17: Hutnik Nowa Huta Polish pronunciation: [ˈxutɲik ˈnɔva ˈxuta]
- 2017–current: Hutnik Kraków

== Honours ==
- Ekstraklasa
  - Third place: 1995–96
- Polish Cup
  - Semi-final: 1989–90
- Polish U-19 championship
  - Champions: 1985, 1993, 1994
  - Third place: 1972, 1988
- Polish U-17 championship
  - Champions: 1997

== Fans ==
Traditionally, Hutnik is considered the third largest team in Kraków, behind fierce city rivals Cracovia and Wisła. The majority of their fanbase is from the district of Nowa Huta and club has 3 fan-clubs: Igołomia&Pobiednik, Szczyrzyc, Górale (which compromises of fans from Zakopane and Nowy Targ).

In recent years the team has spent much of its time in the lower divisions unlike their neighbouring rivals, and the city derbies have usually been played against the reserve teams. As a result, they have developed rivalries with other teams such as Unia Tarnów, and Resovia Rzeszów, as well as KSZO Ostrowiec Świętokrzyski and Stal Stalowa Wola with whom they contest the Steelworks derbies.

The fans have friendly relations with fans of 1.FC Magdeburg, which started after one of the Magdeburg fans logged onto a Hutnik fan forum. They also have good relations with fans of Stomil Olsztyn and Wisła Płock. There are also some friendly contacts with fans of Dynamo Kyiv.

== European record ==
| Season | Competition | Round | Club | Home | Away | Aggregate |
|---|---|---|---|---|---|---|
| 1996–97 | UEFA Cup | Q1 | (Azerbaijan) Khazri Buzovna | 9–0 | 2–2 | 11–2 |
| 1996–97 | UEFA Cup | Q2 | (Czech Republic) Sigma Olomouc | 3–1 | 0–1 | 3–2 |
| 1996–97 | UEFA Cup | R1 | (France) AS Monaco | 0–1 | 1–3 | 1–4 |

== Players ==
=== Current squad ===
As of 15 September 2026

Note: Flags indicate national team as defined under FIFA eligibility rules; some limited exceptions apply. Players may hold more than one non-FIFA nationality.

| No. | Pos. | Nation | Player |
|---|---|---|---|
| 1 | GK | POL | Mateusz Mędrala |
| 5 | DF | POL | Dawid Burka (captain) |
| 8 | MF | UKR | Nikita Kholodov |
| 9 | MF | POL | Kacper Rzepka |
| 10 | FW | POL | Mateusz Sowiński |
| 11 | MF | POL | Oskar Kordykiewicz |
| 12 | GK | POL | Damian Hoyo-Kowalski |
| 13 | DF | POL | Maksymilian Gandziarowski |
| 14 | DF | POL | Krystian Bracik |
| 16 | MF | POL | Szymon Bil |
| 17 | FW | POL | Bartosz Florek |
| 18 | DF | POL | Maksymilian Soja |
| 19 | MF | POL | Oskar Zawada (on loan from Podbeskidzie Bielsko-Biała) |
| 20 | MF | POL | Przemysław Sajdak (on loan from Puszcza Niepołomice) |
| 22 | FW | UKR | Yaroslav Dudchenko |

| No. | Pos. | Nation | Player |
|---|---|---|---|
| 23 | MF | POL | Krystian Lelek |
| 24 | DF | POL | Dawid Ściuk |
| 25 | DF | NGA | Valentine Nweke (on loan from Górnik Zabrze) |
| 26 | MF | POL | Filip Laskowski |
| 27 | MF | POL | Marcin Budziński |
| 31 | GK | POL | Oliwier Klarman |
| 33 | GK | POL | Wiktor Nowak |
| 37 | MF | UKR | Artem Motrych |
| 47 | MF | POL | Igor Gałek |
| 55 | MF | UKR | Nazar Ponomarenko |
| 80 | MF | POL | Mikołaj Zięba |
| 98 | MF | POL | Dawid Pietruszka (on loan from Raków Częstochowa II) |
| 99 | GK | POL | Franciszek Olszewski |
| — | DF | POL | Miłosz Adamczyk |

=== Out on loan ===
Note: Flags indicate national team as defined under FIFA eligibility rules; some limited exceptions apply. Players may hold more than one non-FIFA nationality.

| No. | Pos. | Nation | Player |
|---|---|---|---|
| 20 | MF | POL | Ksawery Halo (at Naprzód Jędrzejów until 30 June 2027) |
| 21 | MF | POL | Karol Szablowski (at Wieczysta Kraków II until 30 June 2027) |

| No. | Pos. | Nation | Player |
|---|---|---|---|
| — | MF | POL | Anthony Ikwuka (at Wieczysta Kraków II until 30 June 2027) |
| — | FW | POL | Damian Śliwa (at Wisłoka Dębica until 30 June 2027) |

=== Notable players ===
Had international caps for their respective countries at any time.

- Krzysztof Bukalski
- Wilde-Donald Guerrier
- Tomasz Hajto
- Marek Koźmiński
- Patrik Mišák
- Zakari Lambo
- Michał Pazdan
- Igors Tarasovs
- Mirosław Waligóra
- Marcin Wasilewski
- Kazimierz Węgrzyn
- Moussa Yahaya
