= 2024–25 Bruk-Bet Termalica Nieciecza season =

Bruk-Bet Termalica Nieciecza
2024–25 season
- Manager: Marcin Brosz
- Stadium: Nieciecza Stadium
- I liga: 1st
- Polish Cup: Pre-season
- Biggest win: Chrobry Głogów 0–4 Termalica Nieciecza
Home colours	Away colours

The 2024–25 season is the 103rd season in the history of Bruk-Bet Termalica Nieciecza, and the club's third consecutive season in I liga. In addition to the domestic league, the team is scheduled to participate in the Polish Cup.

== Transfers ==
=== Out ===
Pos.	Player	Transferred to	Fee	Date	Source
FW	(Poland) Jakub Branecki	(Poland) Chojniczanka Chojnice	Loan	16 July 2024	

== Friendlies ==
=== Friendlies ===
26 June 2024 Friendly	Termalica Nieciecza (Poland)	0–3	(Czech Republic) MFK Karviná	Wodzisław Śląski
11:00			Memić 36'; Kačor 53'; Ojora 62'	Stadium: Gosław Sports Center

2 July 2024 Friendly	Opava (Czech Republic)	1–1	(Poland) Termalica Nieciecza	Kravaře, Czech Republic
17:00				Stadium: stadion MFK Kravaře

12 July 2024 Friendly	Termalica Nieciecza (Poland)	1–1	(Poland) Puszcza Niepołomice	Nieciecza
11:00	Trubeha 53'		Stępień 5'	Stadium: Nieciecza Stadium

13 July 2024 Friendly	Termalica Nieciecza (Poland)	2–0	(Poland) Stal Stalowa Wola	Nieciecza
11:00	Karasek 10'; Wacławek 45'			Stadium: boczne boisko Bruk-Betu Termaliki

6 September 2024 Friendly	Termalica Nieciecza (Poland)	1–2	(Poland) Korona Kielce	Nieciecza
12:30		Report		Stadium: Stadion Sportowy Bruk-Bet Termalica

15 November 2024 Friendly	Motor Lublin (Poland)	1–0	(Poland) Termalica Nieciecza	Wola Chorzelowska
13:00		Report		Stadium: Boisko KS Kolorado Wola Chorzelowska

15 January 2025 Friendly	Termalica Nieciecza (Poland)	1–2	(South Korea) Gangwon	Side
14:00		Report		Stadium: Arslan Zeki Demirci Sports Complex

24 January 2025 Friendly	Termalica Nieciecza (Poland)	2–1	(Hungary) Kecskemét	Side
14:00		Report		Stadium: Sueno Beach Hotel

25 January 2025 Friendly	Termalica Nieciecza (Poland)	2–0	(Serbia) Voždovac	Kumköy
14:00		Report		Stadium: TSS Football Center

27 January 2025 Friendly	Termalica Nieciecza (Poland)	1–1	(Bulgaria) Botev Plovdiv	Kumköy
11:00		Report		Stadium: TSS Football Center

30 January 2025 Friendly	Termalica Nieciecza (Poland)	3–5	(Montenegro) Budućnost	Kumköy
12:30		Report		Stadium: TSS Football Center

31 January 2025 Friendly	Termalica Nieciecza (Poland)	2–1	(Ukraine) Karpaty Lviv	Lara
11:00		Report		Stadium: Titanic Hotel Spor Kompleks Field 2

7 February 2025 Friendly	Termalica Nieciecza (Poland)	–	(Poland) Polonia Bytom
13:00 CET

14 February 2025 Friendly	Termalica Nieciecza (Poland)	–	(Poland) Sandecja Nowy Sącz

== Competitions ==
=== Overall record ===
Competition	First match	Last match	Starting round	Record							
Competition	First match	Last match	Starting round	Pld	W	D	L	GF	GA	GD	Win %
I liga	20 July 2024	25–26 May 2025	Matchday 1	4	4	0	0	12	1	+11	100.00
Polish Cup				0	0	0	0	0	0	+0	—
Total				4	4	0	0	12	1	+11	100.00

Last updated: 11 August 2024
Source: Soccerway

=== I liga ===
==== League table ====
Pos	Team	Pld	W	D	L	GF	GA	GD	Pts	Promotion or Relegation
1	Arka Gdynia (C, P)	34	21	9	4	63	24	+39	72	Promotion to Ekstraklasa
2	Bruk-Bet Termalica Nieciecza (P)	34	21	8	5	70	39	+31	71	Promotion to Ekstraklasa
3	Wisła Płock (O, P)	34	18	10	6	58	38	+20	64	Qualification for the promotion play-offs
4	Wisła Kraków	34	18	8	8	63	32	+31	62	Qualification for the promotion play-offs
5	Miedź Legnica	34	16	8	10	56	45	+11	56 (Note: Ranked based on goal difference: Miedź Legnica +11, Polonia Warsaw +9.)	Qualification for the promotion play-offs

Source: 1liga.org, 90minut.pl
Rules for classification: 1) Points; 2) Head-to-head points; 3) Head-to-head goal difference; 4) Goal difference; 6) Goals scored; 7) Number of wins; 8) Number of away wins.
(Note: Head-to-head record is used only after all the matches between the teams in question have been played)
(C) Champions; (O) Play-off winner; (P) Promoted
Notes:

Semi-finals; 29 May 2025
3	Wisła Płock	2
6	Polonia Warsaw	1
4	Wisła Kraków	0
5	Miedź Legnica	1

Final; 1 June 2025
3	Wisła Płock	2
5	Miedź Legnica	0

==== Results summary ====
Overall								Home						Away					
Pld	W	D	L	GF	GA	GD	Pts	W	D	L	GF	GA	GD	W	D	L	GF	GA	GD
19	14	3	2	42	15	+27	45	6	3	1	23	11	+12	8	0	1	19	4	+15

Last updated: 7 December 2024.
Source: soccerway

==== Results by round ====
Round	1	2	3	4	5	6	7	8	9	10	11	12	13	14	15	16	17	18	19	20	21
Ground	H	A	H	A	H	H	A	H	A	H	A	H	A	H	A	H	A	A	H	A	H
Result	W	W	W	W	D	W	W	W	W	D	W	L	L	W	W	D	W	W	W		
Position	1	1	1	1	1	1	1	1	1	1	1	1	1	1	1	1	1	1	1		

Updated to match(es) played on 7 December 2024. Source:
A = Away; H = Home; W = Win; D = Draw; L = Loss

==== Matches ====
The match schedule was released on 12 June 2024.

21 July 2024 1	Termalica Nieciecza	3–0	Warta Poznań	Nieciecza
14:30	Trubeha 54', 66'; Putivtsev 90+1'		Wojcinowicz (yellow card) 77' (yellow-red card) 81'	Stadium: Stadion Sportowy Bruk-Bet Termalica; Referee: Albert Różycki

27 July 2024 2	Chrobry Głogów	0–4	Termalica Nieciecza	Głogów
14:30			Jakubik 55', 79'; Karasek 72' (pen.); Ambrosiewicz 90+2'	Stadium: Głogów Municipal Stadium; Referee: Łukasz Szczech

4 August 2024 3	Termalica Nieciecza	3–0	Odra Opole	Nieciecza
17:00	Putivtsev 21'; Karasek 62'; Ciesla 81'			Stadium: Stadion Sportowy Bruk-Bet Termalica; Referee: Tomasz Kwiatkowski

11 August 2024 4	Pogoń Siedlce	1–2	Termalica Nieciecza	Siedlce
12:00	Demianiuk 45'		Trubeha 28'; Ambrosiewicz 45+3'	Stadium: Stadion ROSRRiT w Siedlcach; Referee: Grzegorz Kawałko

18 August 2024 5	Termalica Nieciecza	1–1	Ruch Chorzów	Nieciecza
14:30 CET	Faßbender 14'; Daniel Cieśla (yellow card) 63'; Ambrosiewicz (yellow card) 69'; Kasperkiewicz (red card) 78'; Putivtsev (yellow card) 90+3'	Report	Lukić (yellow card) 24'; Szczepan (yellow card) 49' (goal) 64'; Szwoch (yellow card) 90+5'	Stadium: Stadion Sportowy Bruk-Bet Termalica; Referee: (Poland) Marcin Szczerbowicz

21 August 2024 6	Termalica Nieciecza	4–2	Wisła Płock	Nieciecza
18:00 CET	Faßbender (yellow card) 23'; Kacper Karasek 55' 88' 90+1'; Andrzej Trubeha 76' (pen.); Zapolnik (yellow card) 82'	Report	Niepsuj (yellow card) 30' (yellow-red card) 58'; Jime 37'; Kun 71'; Przemysław Misiak (yellow card) 90+3'	Stadium: Stadion Sportowy Bruk-Bet Termalica; Attendance: 1,763; Referee: (Poland) Daniel Stefański

24 August 2024 7	Tychy	0–2	Termalica Nieciecza	Tychy
19:30 CET	Jakub Budnicki (yellow card) 8'; Sanyang (yellow card) 89' (red card) 90+3'	Report	Damian Hilbrycht 39'; Faßbender 84'; Wolski (yellow card) 89'	Stadium: Tychy Municipal Stadium; Attendance: 2,750; Referee: (Poland) Tomasz Kwiatkowski

1 September 2024 8	Termalica Nieciecza	3–0	Stal Stalowa Wola	Nieciecza
12:00 CET	Spendlhofer (yellow card) 7'; Zapolnik 24'; Kasperkiewicz 57'; Nowakowski 82'	Report	Łukasz Furtak (yellow card) 66' (yellow-red card) 79'; Ruszel (yellow card) 70'; Wojtkowski (yellow card) 75'	Stadium: Stadion Sportowy Bruk-Bet Termalica; Attendance: 2,852; Referee: (Poland) Łukasz Kuźma

14 September 2024 9	Stal Rzeszów	1–2	Termalica Nieciecza	Rzeszów
19:30 CET	Szymon Kądziołka (yellow card) 18'; Šimčák (yellow card) 25'; Tomasz Bała 82'; Kacper Plichta (yellow card) 85'; Artur Gaża (yellow card) 90+6'	Report	Kasperkiewicz (yellow card) 18'; Zapolnik 31'; Faßbender 38'; Nowakowski (yellow card) 90+5'; Chovan (yellow card) 90+6'	Stadium: Stal Rzeszów Municipal Stadium; Referee: (Poland) Łukasz Szczech

21 September 2024 10	Termalica Nieciecza	2–2	ŁKS Łódź	Nieciecza
17:30 CET	Wiech 4' (o.g.); Strzałek 16'; Damian Hilbrycht (yellow card) 57'; Kasperkiewicz (yellow card) 78'; Andrzej Trubeha (yellow card) 90'	Report	Piotr Głowacki (yellow card) 7'; Mokrzycki (yellow card) 33' (goal) 76'; Antoni Młynarczyk 38'; Kupczak (yellow card) 73'; Alastuey (yellow card) 85'; Pirulo (yellow card) 89'	Stadium: Stadion Sportowy Bruk-Bet Termalica; Attendance: 2,495; Referee: (Poland) Sebastian Jarzębak

29 September 2024 11	Polonia Warsaw	0–1	Termalica Nieciecza	Warsaw
14:30 CET	Bartłomiej Poczobut (yellow card) 49'; Olszewski (yellow card) 64'; Hoxhallari (yellow card) 85'; Przemysław Szur (yellow card) 90+3'	Report	Ambrosiewicz 66'; Gabriel Isik (yellow card) 70'; Zaviyskyi (yellow card) 80'	Stadium: General Kazimierz Sosnkowski Municipal Stadium; Referee: (Poland) Damian Sylwestrzak

6 October 2024 12	Termalica Nieciecza	1–2	Znicz Pruszków	Nieciecza
19:00 CET	Faßbender 19'; Andrzej Trubeha (yellow card) 85'	Report	Sokół 25' (yellow card) 72'; Daniel Stanclik 44'	Stadium: Stadion Sportowy Bruk-Bet Termalica; Referee: (Poland) Tomasz Wajda

18 October 2024 13	Wisła Kraków	2–0	Termalica Nieciecza	Kraków
20:30 CET	Zwoliński 78' 90+4'; Łasicki (yellow card) 90+6'	Report	Putivtsev (yellow card) 63'	Stadium: Henryk Reyman Municipal Stadium; Attendance: 22,130; Referee: (Poland) Karol Arys

26 October 2024 14	Termalica Nieciecza	2–1	Arka Gdynia	Nieciecza
19:30 CET	Spendlhofer 7'; Ambrosiewicz (yellow card) 14'; Kacper Karasek 82'	Report	Oliveira (yellow card) 14'; Marcjanik 57'	Stadium: Stadion Sportowy Bruk-Bet Termalica; Attendance: 2,184; Referee: (Poland) Paweł Malec

2 November 2024 15	Górnik Łęczna	0–2	Termalica Nieciecza	Łęczna
17:00 CET	David Ogaga (yellow card) 68'	Report	Wolski (yellow card) 44'; Wróbel 47'; Ambrosiewicz (yellow card) 72'; Gabriel Isik 79'; Spendlhofer (yellow card) 90'	Stadium: Łęczna Stadium; Referee: (Poland) Mateusz Piszczelok

9 November 2024 16	Termalica Nieciecza	1–1	Miedź Legnica	Nieciecza
19:30 CET	Gabriel Isik (yellow card) 45'; Zaviyskyi (yellow card) 61'; Putivtsev 90+5'	Report	Gabriel Isik 54' (o.g.); Michał Kostka (yellow card) 55' (yellow-red card) 64'	Stadium: Stadion Sportowy Bruk-Bet Termalica; Attendance: 2,221; Referee: (Poland) Łukasz Szczech

22 November 2024 17	Kotwica Kołobrzeg	0–5	Termalica Nieciecza	Kołobrzeg
18:00 CET	Leon Ziętek (yellow card) 35'; Segbé Azankpo (yellow card) 40'; Zvonimir Petrović (yellow card) 45'	Report	Wolski (yellow card) 23'; Zapolnik 24'; Kacper Karasek 36' (pen.) 52' 55' 57'; Putivtsev (yellow card) 41'	Stadium: Stadion Miejski; Referee: (Poland) Piotr Idzik

1 December 2024 18	Warta Poznań	0–1	Termalica Nieciecza	Grodzisk Wielkopolski
14:30 CET		Report	Zapolnik 50'	Stadium: Dyskobolia Grodzisk Wielkopolski Stadium; Referee: (Poland) Sebastian Jarzębak

7 December 2024 19	Termalica Nieciecza	3–2	Chrobry Głogów	Nieciecza
17:30 CET	Zapolnik 1' 49'; Zaviyskyi (yellow card) 50'; Strzałek 63'	Report	Lebedyński 6' 17'; Szymon Lewkot (yellow card) 21' (yellow-red card) 59'; Mateusz Lewandowski (yellow card) 90+5'	Stadium: Stadion Sportowy Bruk-Bet Termalica; Attendance: 2,138; Referee: (Poland) Paweł Pskit

14 February 2025 20	Odra Opole	–	Termalica Nieciecza	Opole
18:00 CET				Stadium: Odra Stadium

=== Polish Cup ===
24 September 2024 First Round	Termalica Nieciecza	1–2	GKS Katowice	Nieciecza
19:30 CET	Kasperkiewicz (red card) 13'; Kacper Karasek 45'; Spendlhofer (yellow card) 73'	Report	Bartosz Jaroszek 19'; Borja Galán (yellow card) 31'; Marzec (yellow card) 50'; Jakub Antczak 66'	Stadium: Stadion Sportowy Bruk-Bet Termalica; Attendance: 2,348; Referee: (Poland) Piotr Urban
