= 2018–19 I liga =

I liga
- Season: 2018–19
- Dates: 20 July 2018 – 19 May 2019
- Champions: Raków Częstochowa
- Promoted: Raków Częstochowa; ŁKS Łódź
- Relegated: Bytovia Bytów; GKS Katowice; Garbarnia Kraków
- Matches: 306
- Goals: 765 (2.5 per match)
- Top goalscorer: Valērijs Šabala (12 goals)
- Biggest home win: Tychy 5–0 Garbarnia (22 August 2018); Stal 6–1 Garbarnia (10 November 2018); Tychy 5–0 Wigry (28 April 2019); Jastrzębie 5–0 Sandecja (18 May 2019)
- Biggest away win: Wigry 0–5 Podbeskidzie (30 September 2018)
- Highest scoring: Stal 5–4 Termalica (11 May 2019)
- Longest winning run: 9 matches Raków
- Longest unbeaten run: 23 matches Raków
- Longest winless run: 21 matches Bytovia
- Longest losing run: 6 matches Chrobry
- Highest attendance: 6,099; Tychy 4–0 Katowice (24 November 2018)
- Lowest attendance: 99 (Note: Due to the renovation of the Dębińska Road Stadium match played at the Dyskobolia Stadium in Grodzisk Wielkopolski.); Warta 2–2 Bytovia (5 September 2018)
- Total attendance: 578,278
- Average attendance: 1,890 ▼17.0%

The 2018–19 I liga (currently named Fortuna I liga due to sponsorship reasons) was the 11th season of the Polish I liga under its current title, and the 71st season of the second highest division in the Polish football league system since its establishment in 1949. The league was operated by the PZPN. The league was contested by 18 teams. The season was played in a round-robin tournament. The season started on 20 July 2018 and will conclude on 19 May 2019.

== Changes from last season ==
The following teams have changed division since the 2017–18 season.

=== To I liga ===
Relegated from Ekstraklasa

- Bruk-Bet Termalica Nieciecza
- Sandecja Nowy Sącz

Promoted from II liga

- GKS Jastrzębie
- ŁKS Łódź
- Warta Poznań
- Garbarnia Kraków

=== From I liga ===
Promoted to Ekstraklasa

- Miedź Legnica
- Zagłębie Sosnowiec

Relegated to II liga

- Pogoń Siedlce
- Górnik Łęczna
- Olimpia Grudziądz
- Ruch Chorzów

== Team overview ==
Location of teams and stadiums in 2018–19 I liga.

=== Stadiums and locations ===
Team	Location	Stadium	Capacity
Bruk-Bet Termalica Nieciecza	Nieciecza	Stadion Bruk-Bet	4,653
Bytovia Bytów	Bytów	Stadion MOSiR	1,500
Chojniczanka Chojnice	Chojnice	Stadion Miejski Chojniczanka 1930	3,000
Chrobry Głogów	Głogów	Stadion GOS	2,817
Garbarnia Kraków	Kraków	Stadion im. Henryka Reymana	33,326^{1}
GKS Jastrzębie	Jastrzębie-Zdrój	Stadion Miejski	6,800
GKS Katowice	Katowice	Stadion GKS Katowice	6,710
GKS Tychy	Tychy	Stadion Tychy	15,300
ŁKS Łódź	Łódź	Stadion ŁKS	5,700
Odra Opole	Opole	Stadion Odry	4,250
Podbeskidzie Bielsko-Biała	Bielsko-Biała	Stadion BBOSiR	15,316
Puszcza Niepołomice	Niepołomice	Stadion Puszczy	1,000
Raków Częstochowa	Częstochowa	Miejski Stadion Piłkarski Raków	8,000
Sandecja Nowy Sącz	Nowy Sącz	Stadion im. Ojca Władysława Augustynka	2,850
Stal Mielec	Mielec	Stadion MOSiR	6,800
Stomil Olsztyn	Olsztyn	Stadion OSiR	3,500
Warta Poznań	Poznań	Stadion przy Drodze Dębińskiej	4,694
Wigry Suwałki	Suwałki	Stadion OSiR	3,060

1. Garbarnia Kraków played their home games in Stadion im. Henryka Reymana until their home ground (Stadion Garbarni) fulfills license requirements.

== League table ==
Pos	Team	Pld	W	D	L	GF	GA	GD	Pts	Promotion or Relegation
1	Raków Częstochowa (C, P)	34	20	10	4	54	22	+32	70	Promotion to Ekstraklasa
2	ŁKS Łódź (P)	34	20	9	5	58	23	+35	69	Promotion to Ekstraklasa
3	Stal Mielec	34	18	10	6	59	28	+31	64	
4	Sandecja Nowy Sącz	34	14	13	7	35	29	+6	55	
5	GKS Jastrzębie	34	12	12	10	43	38	+5	48 (Note: Head-to-head record: GKS Jastrzębie 2–1 Podbeskidzie, Podbeskidzie 2–2 GKS Jastrzębie.)	
6	Podbeskidzie Bielsko-Biała	34	13	9	12	52	46	+6	48	
7	GKS Tychy	34	12	11	11	48	41	+7	47	
8	Bruk-Bet Termalica Nieciecza	34	12	10	12	45	46	−1	46	
9	Puszcza Niepołomice	34	12	8	14	37	45	−8	44	
10	Chojniczanka Chojnice	34	10	12	12	49	49	0	42	
11	Stomil Olsztyn (Note: Stomil Olsztyn were deducted 3 points for financial arrears.)	34	11	10	13	38	43	−5	40 (Note: Head-to-head record: Stomil 2–1 Odra, Odra 2–2 Stomil.)	
12	Odra Opole	34	10	10	14	47	58	−11	40	
13	Warta Poznań	34	10	9	15	31	43	−12	39 (Note: Head-to-head record: Warta 2–1 Chrobry, Chrobry 1–1 Warta.)	
14	Chrobry Głogów	34	10	9	15	29	39	−10	39	
15	Wigry Suwałki	34	9	10	15	40	56	−16	37 (Note: Head-to-head record: Wigry - 7 points, Bytovia - 5 points, GKS Katowice - 4 points.)	
16	Bytovia Bytów (R)	34	7	16	11	45	50	−5	37	Relegation to 2019–20 II liga
17	GKS Katowice (R)	34	9	10	15	34	45	−11	37	Relegation to 2019–20 II liga
18	Garbarnia Kraków (R)	34	5	6	23	21	64	−43	21	Relegation to 2019–20 II liga

Source: 1 liga, 90minut
Rules for classification: 1. points won; 2. points in head-to-head matches; 3. goal difference in hth matches; 4. goals scored in hth matches; 5. away goals in hth matches (only if two teams are tied); 6. total goal difference; 7. total goals scored; 8. fairplay ranking.
(C) Champions; (P) Promoted; (R) Relegated

== Positions by round ==
Team / Round	1	2	3	4	5	6	7	8	9	10	11	12	13	14	15	16	17	18	19	20	21	22	23	24	25	26	27	28	29	30	31	32	33	34
Raków	1	2	9	1	1	1	1	1	1	1	1	1	1	1	1	1	1	1	1	1	1	1	1	1	1	1	1	1	1	1	1	1	1	1
ŁKS	6	10	8	4	5	11	8	12	12	7	5	5	3	6	3	2	2	2	2	3	4	3	2	2	2	2	2	2	2	2	2	2	2	2
Stal	2	9	12	8	12	5	6	11	11	13	13	13	12	12	11	10	6	4	4	4	3	2	4	3	3	3	3	4	3	3	3	3	3	3
Sandecja	8	17	15	11	11	6	2	2	3	3	3	2	2	2	2	3	3	3	3	2	2	4	3	4	4	4	4	3	4	4	4	4	4	4
GKS Jastrzębie	12	17	17	17	18	16	11	7	6	9	7	10	6	7	5	5	8	5	6	8	7	5	5	8	6	8	7	6	6	5	5	5	7	5
Podbeskidzie	6	7	13	15	6	4	4	10	10	11	12	11	10	11	10	7	5	7	8	6	5	6	6	5	5	5	5	5	5	6	6	6	5	6
GKS Tychy	12	13	15	10	14	7	10	6	7	8	11	12	13	13	14	14	15	12	10	11	12	11	10	10	11	9	10	10	10	9	7	7	6	7
Bruk-Bet Termalica	12	5	7	14	17	17	17	17	18	18	18	14	15	15	15	15	14	13	13	12	9	9	9	9	10	11	8	7	7	8	9	8	8	8
Puszcza	18	6	3	6	9	14	12	8	8	12	9	7	8	8	4	4	4	6	7	5	6	8	8	6	9	6	6	9	9	7	8	9	9	9
Chojniczanka	9	11	4	7	8	3	7	5	5	4	4	4	5	4	9	11	7	9	5	7	8	7	7	7	7	7	9	8	8	10	11	12	13	10
Stomil	10	16	10	13	2	13	14	14	15	16	14	15	17	17	18	16	16	16	14	16	16	16	16	15	15	13	14	14	16	16	15	14	10	11
Odra	3	1	2	5	10	12	13	9	9	6	8	6	9	9	6	6	10	10	11	10	11	12	11	11	8	10	11	11	11	11	12	11	12	12
Warta	10	12	11	3	3	9	16	16	14	15	15	16	14	14	13	12	12	14	15	14	13	14	13	14	14	14	12	12	13	13	10	10	11	13
Chrobry	15	14	14	9	13	15	9	13	13	10	10	8	4	3	7	9	11	11	12	13	14	15	14	12	12	12	13	13	12	12	13	13	14	14
Wigry	3	3	5	12	15	8	5	4	4	5	6	9	11	10	12	13	13	15	16	15	15	13	15	16	16	16	17	15	14	15	17	17	16	15
Bytovia	3	4	1	2	7	2	3	3	2	2	2	3	7	5	8	8	9	8	9	9	10	10	12	13	13	15	15	17	17	17	16	16	17	16
GKS Katowice	15	8	6	16	4	9	15	15	16	17	17	17	16	16	17	18	17	17	17	17	17	17	17	17	17	17	16	16	15	14	14	15	15	17
Garbarnia	17	15	18	18	16	18	18	18	17	14	16	18	18	18	16	17	18	18	18	18	18	18	18	18	18	18	18	18	18	18	18	18	18	18

== Results ==
Home \ Away	BBT	BYT	CCH	GŁO	GAR	JAS	KAT	TYC	ŁKS	ODR	POD	PNI	RAK	SNS	STA	STO	WAR	WIG
Bruk-Bet Termalica Nieciecza	—	1–2	2–1	1–2	1–0	0–0	1–1	3–1	1–1	3–0	1–0	2–2	0–1	1–1	1–2	1–1	1–0	1–0
Bytovia Bytów	2–2	—	2–1	1–1	1–1	1–2	2–2	4–1	0–2	1–1	1–1	0–0	2–2	1–1	1–2	0–0	0–0	1–1
Chojniczanka Chojnice	1–1	1–1	—	1–2	5–1	1–1	2–1	4–1	1–2	4–1	2–2	1–1	2–1	3–3	2–2	2–1	0–2	3–1
Chrobry Głogów	0–1	0–0	2–0	—	3–0	1–0	2–0	0–1	0–1	1–2	1–1	2–3	0–1	0–0	0–0	2–0	1–1	0–2
Garbarnia Kraków	1–3	0–3	1–2	0–1	—	0–1	0–2	1–3	3–2	0–0	0–2	0–1	1–1	0–1	0–2	0–2	2–1	0–0
GKS Jastrzębie	4–2	4–0	0–0	0–0	1–2	—	1–2	1–1	0–2	3–1	2–1	0–2	1–5	5–0	1–0	2–1	0–0	1–2
GKS Katowice	1–2	1–2	2–2	2–2	1–2	0–1	—	1–1	1–1	2–2	0–1	1–1	0–3	0–0	0–2	1–1	0–2	2–0
GKS Tychy	2–1	1–0	0–1	1–1	5–0	2–1	4–0	—	0–2	4–2	2–2	3–0	0–0	0–1	1–1	0–3	1–0	5–0
ŁKS Łódź	1–1	2–3	2–0	2–0	3–0	2–0	0–1	0–0	—	5–1	3–0	0–1	2–0	2–0	0–2	1–0	3–0	2–1
Odra Opole	4–1	2–1	3–0	3–0	3–0	1–2	0–4	2–1	3–3	—	0–1	1–1	0–2	1–0	1–1	2–2	2–1	2–2
Podbeskidzie Bielsko-Biała	1–2	3–1	2–1	3–0	0–0	2–2	0–2	2–0	0–3	3–1	—	3–1	0–0	1–1	0–2	1–3	4–1	3–3
Puszcza Niepołomice	1–0	1–3	0–2	3–0	3–2	2–0	1–2	1–0	0–2	0–0	3–2	—	1–3	1–0	1–0	1–2	0–1	1–1
Raków Częstochowa	1–0	2–1	1–0	1–0	1–0	2–2	2–0	0–0	1–1	1–0	2–0	3–0	—	2–0	1–1	2–0	3–0	1–2
Sandecja Nowy Sącz	0–0	1–1	2–0	1–0	0–1	1–1	1–0	1–3	0–0	2–0	2–0	2–1	2–2	—	2–0	1–0	2–1	2–0
Stal Mielec	5–4	2–1	4–2	5–1	6–1	0–0	2–0	1–1	0–1	1–1	0–1	1–0	3–1	0–0	—	4–0	2–0	0–0
Stomil Olsztyn	3–0	3–2	0–0	0–2	1–0	1–1	0–1	2–0	2–2	2–1	0–2	2–2	1–1	0–0	2–5	—	0–1	2–1
Warta Poznań	1–2	2–2	1–1	2–1	1–1	0–0	0–1	1–1	0–2	2–1	4–3	2–0	0–2	1–3	1–0	0–1	—	1–0
Wigry Suwałki	3–2	4–2	1–1	0–1	2–1	1–3	2–0	2–2	1–1	2–3	0–5	2–1	0–3	1–2	0–1	2–0	1–1	—

Source: 1 liga
Legend: Blue = home team win; Yellow = draw; Red = away team win.
For upcoming matches, an "a" indicates there is an article about the rivalry between the two participants.

== Results by round ==
Team ╲ Round	1	2	3	4	5	6	7	8	9	10	11	12	13	14	15	16	17	18	19	20	21	22	23	24	25	26	27	28	29	30	31	32	33	34
Bruk-Bet Termalica	L	W	D	L	D	L	L	L	L	W	L	W	D	W	D	L	W	D	D	W	W	D	W	L	D	D	W	W	D	L	L	W	L	W
Bytovia	W	D	W	L	W	D	W	D	W	D	D	L	L	D	D	D	D	D	L	D	L	D	D	L	L	L	D	L	D	L	W	L	D	W
Chojniczanka	D	D	W	D	D	W	L	W	W	L	W	D	D	D	L	L	W	L	L	W	D	W	L	L	D	D	D	W	L	L	L	D	L	W
Chrobry	L	D	D	W	L	D	W	L	W	L	W	W	W	D	L	D	L	L	L	L	L	L	W	W	L	L	D	L	W	W	L	D	D	D
Garbarnia	L	D	L	D	W	L	L	L	D	W	L	L	L	L	W	L	L	L	W	D	L	L	L	W	D	L	W	L	D	L	L	L	L	L
GKS Jastrzębie	L	D	L	D	W	D	W	W	L	W	D	D	W	L	W	D	D	W	L	L	D	W	L	L	D	D	W	W	D	W	D	L	L	W
GKS Katowice	L	W	D	L	W	L	L	L	L	D	D	L	W	L	L	L	D	W	L	D	D	L	L	W	W	D	D	W	D	D	W	L	W	L
GKS Tychy	L	D	D	W	L	W	D	W	L	D	D	L	L	D	D	D	L	W	W	W	L	L	W	D	D	W	L	L	W	W	W	W	D	L
ŁKS	W	L	D	W	L	L	W	L	W	W	D	D	W	W	D	W	W	W	D	D	D	W	W	W	W	W	L	W	W	D	W	W	W	D
Odra	W	W	D	L	L	L	D	W	W	D	W	W	D	D	W	L	L	L	L	L	W	W	L	D	L	W	L	D	D	D	L	W	L	D
Podbeskidzie	W	L	L	D	W	W	D	L	D	L	D	W	D	W	L	W	W	L	W	L	W	L	L	W	L	W	W	L	D	L	D	D	W	D
Puszcza	L	W	W	L	D	L	D	W	L	W	D	W	D	D	W	D	W	L	W	L	L	L	D	D	W	L	W	L	L	W	L	L	L	W
Raków	W	D	L	W	W	W	W	W	D	D	W	W	D	D	D	W	W	W	W	W	W	W	W	W	D	W	L	W	D	W	L	D	D	L
Sandecja	D	L	D	W	D	W	W	W	W	D	D	D	W	W	L	L	D	W	W	W	D	D	D	L	W	D	D	W	L	L	W	W	D	L
Stal	W	L	L	W	L	W	D	L	D	D	D	D	D	D	W	W	W	W	W	W	W	W	L	D	W	D	W	L	W	D	W	W	W	W
Stomil	D	W	L	W	L	L	L	L	L	W	L	L	L	D	D	W	L	W	W	L	D	W	D	W	D	D	D	D	L	D	W	W	W	L
Warta	D	W	W	L	L	L	D	L	D	L	D	W	D	W	L	W	L	L	L	L	W	D	W	L	D	L	W	L	D	W	W	D	L	L
Wigry	W	D	D	L	L	W	W	W	D	D	D	L	L	D	L	D	L	L	L	W	L	W	L	L	D	L	L	W	D	D	L	L	W	W

W = Win; D = Draw; L = Loss

== Top goalscorers ==
Rank	Player	Club	Goals
1	(Latvia) Valērijs Šabala	Podbeskidzie Bielsko-Biała	12
2	(Poland) Grzegorz Lech	Stomil Olsztyn	11
3	(Poland) Adrian Błąd	GKS Katowice	10
3	(Poland) Łukasz Grzeszczyk	GKS Tychy	10
3	(Poland) Rafał Kujawa	ŁKS Łódź	10
3	(Poland) Bartosz Nowak	Stal Mielec	10
7	(Poland) Kamil Adamek	GKS Jastrzębie	9
7	(Poland) Krzysztof Danielewicz	Chojniczanka Chojnice	9
7	(Latvia) Vladislavs Gutkovskis	Bruk-Bet Termalica Nieciecza	9
7	(Spain) Dani Ramírez	ŁKS Łódź	9
7	(Poland) Szymon Skrzypczak	Odra Opole	9
7	(Poland) Jakub Wróbel	Garbarnia Kraków (5); GKS Jastrzębie (4)	9

== Attendances ==
Pos	Team	Total	High	Low	Average	Change
1	ŁKS Łódź	77,481	5,271	3,614	4,558	n/a^{2}
2	GKS Tychy	70,322	6,099	2,794	4,137	n/a
3	Stal Mielec	53,756	4,815	2,285	3,162	n/a
4	Raków Częstochowa	48,452	4,011	1,921	2,850	n/a
5	Podbeskidzie Bielsko-Biała	36,981	3,790	1,282	2,175	n/a
6	GKS Katowice	36,830	4,000	1,050	2,166	n/a
7	GKS Jastrzębie	34,933	3,644	1,465	2,055	n/a^{2}
8	Stomil Olsztyn	33,927	2,573	1,005	1,996	n/a
9	Sandecja Nowy Sącz	32,618	2,994	557	1,919	+13.0%^{1}
10	Odra Opole	26,279	2,595	561	1,546	n/a
11	Bruk-Bet Termalica Nieciecza	24,419	2,168	1,084	1,436	−48.3%^{1}
12	Chojniczanka Chojnice	23,915	2,168	453	1,407	n/a
13	Wigry Suwałki	19,172	1,884	775	1,128	n/a
14	Warta Poznań (Note: Due to the renovation of the Dębińska Road Stadium match played at the Dyskobolia Stadium in Grodzisk Wielkopolski.)	13,342	1,484	99	791	n/a^{2}
15	Puszcza Niepołomice	13,170	1,550	522	775	n/a
16	Chrobry Głogów	12,303	1,496	283	724	n/a
17	Bytovia Bytów	11,244	982	360	661	n/a
18	Garbarnia Kraków	9,034	1,586	200	531	n/a^{2}
	League total	578,278	6,099	99	1,890	−17.0%

Source: 90minut (in Polish)
Notes:
1. Team played last season in Ekstraklasa.
2. Team played last season in II liga.

== Awards ==
=== Team of the season ===
Pos.	Player	Club	Ref.
GK	(Poland) Michał Kołba	ŁKS Łódź	
DF	(Poland) Dawid Gojny	GKS Jastrzębie	
DF	(Czech Republic) Tomáš Petrášek	Raków Częstochowa	
DF	(Poland) Kamil Szymura	GKS Jastrzębie	
DF	(Poland) Jan Grzesik	ŁKS Łódź	
MF	(Poland) Patryk Bryła	ŁKS Łódź	
MF	(Poland) Marcin Listkowski	Raków Częstochowa	
MF	(Poland) Grzegorz Lech	Stomil Olsztyn	
MF	(Spain) Dani Ramírez	ŁKS Łódź	
FW	(Poland) Kamil Adamek	GKS Jastrzębie	
FW	(Poland) Rafał Kujawa	ŁKS Łódź	

== See also ==
- 2018–19 Ekstraklasa
- 2018–19 Polish Cup
