= Thiago Dombroski =

Brazilian footballer

Personal information
- Full name: Thiago Dombroski Moreira
- Date of birth: 20 June 2002 (age 24)
- Place of birth: Curitiba, Brazil
- Height: 1.91 m (6 ft 3 in)
- Position: Centre-back

Team information
- Current team: Bruk-Bet Termalica
- Number: 55

Youth career
- 2015–2022: Coritiba
- 2021: → São Paulo (loan)

Senior career*
Years	Team	Apps	(Gls)
2022–2025	Coritiba	7	(0)
2022	→ Portuguesa Santista (loan)	11	(1)
2023	→ Azuriz (loan)	8	(0)
2024–2025	→ Portimonense (loan)	0	(0)
2025–	Bruk-Bet Termalica	1	(0)
2026	→ Paraná (loan)	13	(3)
- * Club domestic league appearances and goals as of 15:34, 20 July 2026 (UTC)

Thiago Dombroski Moreira (born 20 June 2002), also known as Thiagão, is a Brazilian professional footballer who plays as a centre-back for I liga club Bruk-Bet Termalica Nieciecza.

== Club career ==
Born in Curitiba, Paraná, Dombroski joined Coritiba's youth setup in 2015, aged 12. On 1 May 2021, he was loaned to São Paulo until January 2023, with a buyout clause, and was assigned to the under-20 team.

Dombroski left São Paulo in December 2021, but was loaned to Portuguesa Santista on 30 January 2022. He made his senior debut with the side during the year's Campeonato Paulista Série A2 before returning to Coxa in March 2022.

On 11 January 2023, after finishing his formation, Dombroski joined Azuriz on loan for the 2023 Campeonato Paranaense. He returned to Coritiba at the end of the tournament, and made his first team – and Série A – debut on 11 May 2023, starting in a 1–1 home draw against Vasco da Gama.

On 26 January 2024, Coritiba sent Dombroski on loan to Primeira Liga club Portimonense until the end of the 2024–25 season, with an option-to-buy, but failed to make an appearance for the side.

On 29 January 2025, he signed with Polish second division club Bruk-Bet Termalica Nieciecza on a two-and-a-half-year deal. Exactly one year later, he was loaned back to Brazil, joining Paraná until the end of the season.

== Personal life ==
Dombroski is of Polish descent through his grandfather. In June 2024, his citizenship was confirmed and he received a Polish passport.

== Career statistics ==
As of match played 20 October 2025

Appearances and goals by club, season and competition
Club	Season	League			State league		National cup		Continental		Other		Total	
Club	Season	Division	Apps	Goals	Apps	Goals	Apps	Goals	Apps	Goals	Apps	Goals	Apps	Goals
Portuguesa Santista	2022	Paulista A2	—		11	1	—		—		—		11	1
Azuriz	2023	Paranaense	—		8	0	—		—		—		8	0
Coritiba	2023	Série A	7	0	—		—		—		—		7	0
Portimonense (loan)	2023–24	Primeira Liga	0	0	—		—		—		—		0	0
Portimonense (loan)	2024–25	Primeira Liga	0	0	—		0	0	—		—		0	0
Portimonense (loan)	Total		0	0	0	0	0	0	0	0	0	0	0	0
Bruk-Bet Termalica	2024–25	I liga	0	0	—		—		—		—		0	0
Bruk-Bet Termalica	2025–26	Ekstraklasa	1	0	—		0	0	—		—		1	0
Bruk-Bet Termalica	Total		1	0	—		0	0	—		—		1	0
Career total			8	0	19	1	0	0	0	0	0	0	27	1
