= Patryk Bryła =

Polish footballer

Personal information
- Date of birth: 4 March 1990 (age 36)
- Place of birth: Kraków, Poland
- Height: 1.78 m (5 ft 10 in)
- Position: Winger

Team information
- Current team: Glinik Gorlice
- Number: 69

Youth career
- Krakus Nowa Huta

Senior career*
Years	Team	Apps	(Gls)
2008–2009	Zagłębie Lubin II	21	(2)
2009–2011	Zagłębie Lubin (ME)	47	(14)
2011	Zagłębie Lubin	2	(0)
2011–2013	KS Polkowice	54	(5)
2014–2015	Okocimski Brzesko	37	(3)
2016–2020	ŁKS Łódź	96	(20)
2020	Bruk-Bet Termalica	0	(0)
2020–2021	Chrobry Głogów	24	(1)
2021–2023	Zagłębie Sosnowiec	53	(2)
2023–2025	Sandecja Nowy Sącz	37	(2)
2025–	Glinik Gorlice	0	(0)
- * Club domestic league appearances and goals as of 15:07, 8 June 2025 (UTC)

Patryk Bryła (born 4 March 1990) is a Polish professional footballer who plays as a winger for IV liga Lesser Poland club Glinik Gorlice.

== Career ==
In August 2011, Bryławas loaned to KS Polkowice on a one-year deal.

On 29 July 2020, Bryła joined Chrobry Głogów on a one-year contract.

== Honours ==
Sandecja Nowy Sącz

- III liga, group IV: 2024–25
- Polish Cup (Nowy Sącz regionals): 2024–25

Individual

- I liga Team of the Season: 2018–19
