= Jakub Nowakowski =

Jakub Nowakowski can refer to:

- Jakub Tomasz Nowakowski, Polish zoologist, army major and conspiracy activist during World War II.
- Jakub Nowakowski (footballer), Polish association football player.
