= Waldemar Piątek =

Polish footballer

Personal information
- Date of birth: 2 November 1979 (age 46)
- Place of birth: Dębica, Poland
- Height: 1.84 m (6 ft 0 in)
- Position: Goalkeeper

Team information
- Current team: Bruk-Bet Termalica (goalkeeping coach)

Senior career*
Years	Team	Apps	(Gls)
1996–2001	Wisłoka Dębica		
2001–2003	KSZO Ostrowiec Świętokrzyski	42	(0)
2003–2006	Lech Poznań	48	(0)

Managerial career
- 2008: Sandecja Nowy Sącz (goalkeeping coach)
- 2008: Wisłoka Dębica (goalkeeping coach)
- 2009: Rafineria/Czarni Jasło (goalkeeping coach)
- 2009–2010: Kolejarz Stróże (goalkeeping coach)
- 2010–2013: Poland U16–U17 (goalkeeping coach)
- 2011: Wisła Płock (goalkeeping coach)
- 2011: Olimpia Elbląg (assistant & goalkeeping coach)
- 2011–2013: Kolejarz Stróże (goalkeeping coach)
- 2013–2015: Poland U15–U17 (goalkeeping coach)
- 2013–2015: Stal Rzeszów (goalkeeping coach)
- 2014: Poland U11 (goalkeeping coach)
- 2014–2015: Poland U12–U13 (goalkeeping coach)
- 2015: Siarka Tarnobrzeg (goalkeeping coach)
- 2016–2017: Wisłoka Dębica
- 2016–2017: Poland U15 (goalkeeping coach)
- 2017–: Bruk-Bet Termalica (goalkeeping coach)
- 2019–2020: Bruk-Bet Termalica (caretaker)
- 2021–2022: Bruk-Bet Termalica (caretaker)
- * Club domestic league appearances and goals

Waldemar Piątek (born 2 November 1979) is a Polish former professional footballer who played as a goalkeeper.

== Club career ==
He started his career in Wisłoka Dębica where he played until the spring season of 2001. Then, he moved to KSZO Ostrowiec Świętokrzyski, and in the spring of 2003 he was bought by Lech Poznań. In the 2003–04 season, while representing Lech, he won the Polish Cup and Polish Super Cup.

Piątek was highly regarded as a goalkeeper, before having his career cut short after being diagnosed with hepatitis C in mid-2005.

== International career ==
In July 2004 Piątek was called up to the Poland national football team for a friendly game in Chicago against the United States. However, he spent the entirety of the 1–1 draw on the bench.

== Coaching career ==
Piątek moved into coaching in 2008, when he took on the role of Sandecja Nowy Sącz's goalkeeping coach. On two occasions, in 2019 and 2021, he was appointed caretaker manager of Bruk-Bet Termalica Nieciecza, following the dismissals of Piotr Mandrysz and Mariusz Lewandowski.

== Honours ==
Lech Poznań

- Polish Cup: 2003–04
- Polish Super Cup: 2004
