= Rafał Kujawa =

Polish footballer

Personal information
- Full name: Rafał Kujawa
- Date of birth: 11 July 1988 (age 38)
- Place of birth: Łódź, Poland
- Height: 1.85 m (6 ft 1 in)
- Position: Forward

Youth career
- 2006–2007: ŁKS Łódź

Senior career*
Years	Team	Apps	(Gls)
2007–2012	ŁKS Łódź	97	(19)
2012–2013	GKS Katowice	13	(0)
2013	Pelikan Łowicz	16	(6)
2013–2014	Bruk-Bet Termalica	26	(7)
2014–2015	GKS Katowice	20	(2)
2015–2017	Stomil Olsztyn	55	(18)
2017–2020	ŁKS Łódź	50	(16)
2020–2021	Polonia Warsaw	26	(3)
2021–2022	GKS Bełchatów	2	(0)
2022–2023	GKS Wikielec	45	(12)
2023	Łysica Bodzentyn	16	(6)
Total		366	(89)

International career
2008–2009	Poland U21	3	(0)
- * Club domestic league appearances and goals

Rafał Kujawa (born 11 July 1988) is a Polish former professional footballer who played as a forward. He began his youth career at ŁKS Łódź, where he later made his professional debut during the 2007–08 season.

== Club career ==
Kujawa made his Ekstraklasa debut for ŁKS Łódź in November 2007.

== International career ==
He was a part of the Poland national under-21 football team.

== Honours ==
ŁKS Łódź

- I liga: 2010–11

GKS Wikielec

- IV liga Warmia-Masuria: 2022–23
- Polish Cup (Warmia-Masuria regionals): 2021–22

Individual

- I liga Team of the Season: 2018–19
- I liga Goal of the Season: 2018–19
