= Arkadiusz Kasperkiewicz =

Polish footballer

Personal information
- Date of birth: 29 September 1994 (age 32)
- Place of birth: Łódź, Poland
- Height: 1.87 m (6 ft 2 in)
- Position: Centre-back

Team information
- Current team: Podbeskidzie
- Number: 3

Youth career
- –2009: Start Łódź
- 2009–2013: MSP Szamotuły

Senior career*
Years	Team	Apps	(Gls)
2013–2014	Widzew Łódź II	25	(1)
2014–2015	Widzew Łódź	14	(0)
2015–2017	Olimpia Grudziądz	28	(0)
2017–2018	Górnik Łęczna	27	(1)
2019–2020	Raków Częstochowa	36	(2)
2020–2022	Arka Gdynia	45	(0)
2022–2023	Stal Mielec	40	(2)
2023–2026	Bruk-Bet Termalica	75	(5)
2026–	Podbeskidzie	0	(0)
- * Club domestic league appearances and goals as of 21:38, 25 May 2026 (UTC)

Arkadiusz Kasperkiewicz (born 29 September 1994) is a Polish professional footballer who plays as a centre-back for I liga club Podbeskidzie Bielsko-Biała.

== Club career ==
On 4 August 2020, Kasperkiewicz joined Arka Gdynia.

== Honours ==
Raków Częstochowa

- I liga: 2018–19
