= Mirosław Kalita =

Polish football manager (born 1970)

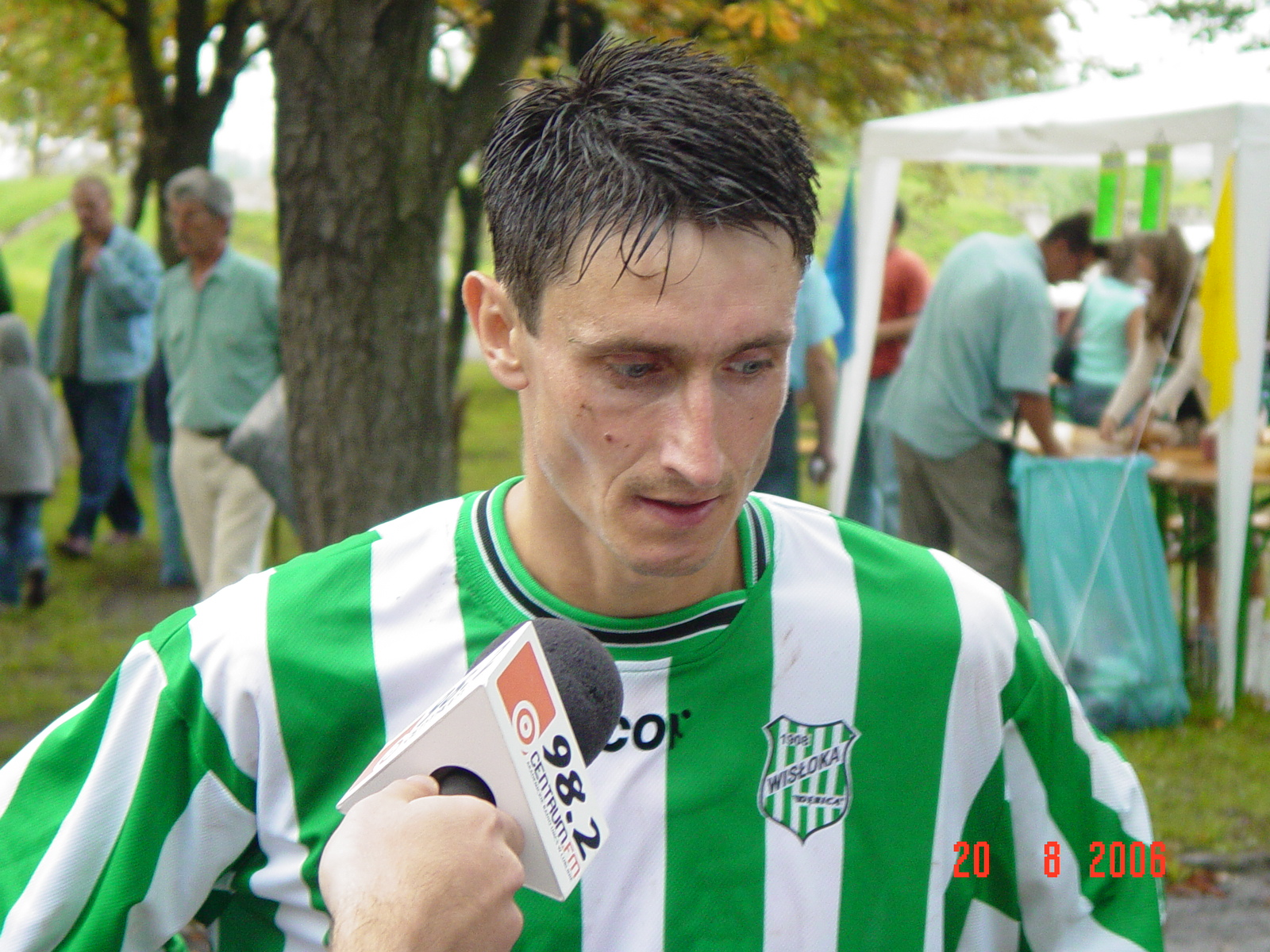
- Kalita with Wisłoka Dębica

Personal information
- Full name: Mirosław Kalita
- Date of birth: 18 July 1970 (age 56)
- Place of birth: Dębica, Poland
- Height: 1.79 m (5 ft 10 in)
- Position: Midfielder

Team information
- Current team: LKS Nagoszyn; Igloopol Dębica (assistant); Poland U17 (assistant)

Senior career*
Years	Team	Apps	(Gls)
1990–1996	Wisłoka Dębica	85	(15)
1996–1999	Amica Wronki	73	(3)
1999–2000	Śląsk Wrocław	39	(9)
2000–2002	RKS Radomsko	61	(13)
2002	KSZO Ostrowiec Świętokrzyski	6	(0)
2003	Resovia		
2004–2009	Wisłoka Dębica		
2009	Pogoń Leżajsk		
2010–2014	LKS Nagoszyn		
2014–2017	Watra Białka Tatrzańska		
2018–2019	Watra Białka Tatrzańska	4	(0)
2019	Polonia Rzeszów	0	(0)
2019	Watra Białka Tatrzańska	0	(0)
2020–	LKS Nagoszyn	52	(21)

Managerial career
- 2004–2009: Wisłoka Dębica (player-manager)
- 2009–2011: Partyzant Targowiska
- 2011–2013: Stal Stalowa Wola
- 2013–2014: Wisłoka Dębica
- 2014–2017: Watra Białka Tatrzańska (player-manager)
- 2017–2022: Poland U21 (assistant)
- 2022: Poland (assistant)
- 2023: Cracovia II
- 2023: Watra Białka Tatrzańska
- 2023–2024: Poland U16 (assistant)
- 2024–: Igloopol Dębica (assistant)
- 2024–: Poland U17 (assistant)
- * Club domestic league appearances and goals as of 18 July 2024

Mirosław Kalita (born 18 July 1970) is a Polish professional football manager who serves as the assistant coach of Igloopol Dębica and Poland U17. He is also a player who plays as a midfielder on amateur level for LKS Nagorzyn.

== Honours ==
Amica Wronki

- Polish Cup: 1997–98, 1998–99
