= Morgan Faßbender =

German footballer

Personal information
- Date of birth: 18 October 1998 (age 28)
- Place of birth: Stuttgart, Germany
- Height: 1.88 m (6 ft 2 in)
- Position: Midfielder

Team information
- Current team: Korona Kielce
- Number: 22

Youth career
- VfB Stuttgart
- SSV Ulm
- –2016: SGV Freiberg
- 2016–2017: Stuttgarter Kickers

Senior career*
Years	Team	Apps	(Gls)
2018	SGV Freiberg	8	(0)
2018–2019	FV Illertissen	3	(0)
2019–2020	Göppinger SV	29	(4)
2020–2021	Chemie Leipzig	12	(4)
2021–2023	SV Meppen	63	(7)
2023–2026	Bruk-Bet Termalica	84	(12)
2026–	Korona Kielce	5	(3)
- * Club domestic league appearances and goals as of 10:24, 30 August 2026 (UTC)

Morgan Faßbender (born 18 October 1998) is a German professional footballer who plays as a midfielder for Ekstraklasa club Korona Kielce.

== Career ==
=== Early career ===
Born in Stuttgart, Faßbender played youth football for VfB Stuttgart, SSV Ulm 1846, SGV Freiberg and Stuttgarter Kickers. He started his senior career at SGV Freiberg, where he made eight appearances in the second half of the 2017–18 season. He left the club at the end of the season. He joined FV Illertissen in the Regionalliga Bayern in September 2018, where he made three appearances before joining Göppinger SV in early 2019. He scored twice in 14 appearances across the remainder of the 2018–19 season whilst he scored two goals in 15 matches during the 2019–20 season.

=== Chemie Leipzig ===
In July 2020, he signed for Chemie Leipzig on a one-year contract with the option of an additional year. He scored four goals in 12 appearances during the 2020–21 season. At the end of the season, Faßbender was offered a new contract by the club but initially rejected it to search for new club. He subsequently asked to remain at the club but was released as the club had recruited new players in his position.

=== SV Meppen ===
He signed a two-year contract with 3. Liga side SV Meppen on 17 June 2021. He made his debut for the club in a 3–1 defeat to Hallescher FC on 24 July 2021.

=== Bruk-Bet Termalica ===
On 26 June 2023, Faßbender moved abroad for the first time in his career to join Polish second division club Bruk-Bet Termalica Nieciecza.

=== Korona Kielce ===
On 23 July 2026, Faßbender joined Polish Ekstraklasa club Korona Kielce on a deal until 2028, with an option for a further year.

== Career statistics ==
As of match played 3 May 2026

Appearances and goals by club, season and competition
Club	Season	League			National cup (Note: Includes DFB-Pokal, Polish Cup)		Other		Total	
Club	Season	Division	Apps	Goals	Apps	Goals	Apps	Goals	Apps	Goals
SGV Freiberg	2017–18	Oberliga Baden-Württemberg	8	0	—		0	0	8	0
FV Illertissen	2018–19	Regionalliga Bayern	3	0	—		0	0	3	0
Göppinger SV	2018–19	Oberliga Baden-Württemberg	14	2	—		0	0	14	2
Göppinger SV	2019–20	Oberliga Baden-Württemberg	15	2	—		0	0	15	2
Göppinger SV	Total		29	4	0	0	0	0	29	4
Chemie Leipzig	2020–21	Regionalliga Nordost	12	4	—		0	0	12	4
SV Meppen	2021–22	3. Liga	35	5	1	0	0	0	36	5
SV Meppen	2022–23	3. Liga	28	2	0	0	0	0	28	2
SV Meppen	Total		63	7	1	0	0	0	64	7
Bruk-Bet Termalica	2023–24	I liga	24	3	1	0	—		25	3
Bruk-Bet Termalica	2024–25	I liga	31	6	1	0	—		32	6
Bruk-Bet Termalica	2025–26	Ekstraklasa	29	3	1	0	—		30	3
Bruk-Bet Termalica	Total		84	12	3	0	0	0	87	12
Korona Kielce	2026–27	Ekstraklasa	0	0	0	0	—		0	0
Career total			199	27	4	0	0	0	203	27
