= Wisłoka Dębica =

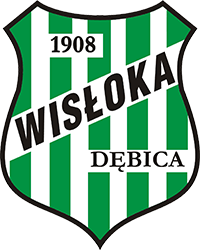
- Full name: Klub Sportowy Wisłoka Dębica
- Nicknames: Biało-Zieloni (The White and Greens); Biancoverde
- Founded: 1908; 118 years ago
- Ground: Wisłoka Stadium
- Capacity: 760
- Chairman: Jakub Kolbusz
- Manager: Michał Bogacz
- League: III liga, group IV
- 2025–26: III liga, group IV, 11th of 18
- Website: www.wislokadebica.pl
Home colours	Away colours

Wisłoka Dębica (Polish pronunciation: [viˈswɔka dɛmˈbitsa]) is one of the oldest existing sports clubs in Poland, founded in 1908 by a group of Dębica's high school students. The name comes from the River Wisłoka, which flows by the town of Dębica (south-east Poland, 110 kilometers east of Kraków). The most famous athletes, representing the club, are Greco-Roman wrestlers. They won numerous medals, including Olympic, World and European Championships. Names like twins Kazimierz Lipień and Józef Lipień, Ryszard Świerad, Jan Michalik or Roman Wrocławski (who later emigrated to the US, and was the coach of Rulon Gardner) are well known by all fans of wrestling. The club is also renowned for soccer players such as Leszek Pisz, Mirosław Kalita and Waldemar Piątek, who started their careers there, boxers (such as vice-champion of Europe, Roman Gotfryd), and bicycle racers.

Their football team competes in the fourth group of the III liga, the fourth tier of Polish football league system.

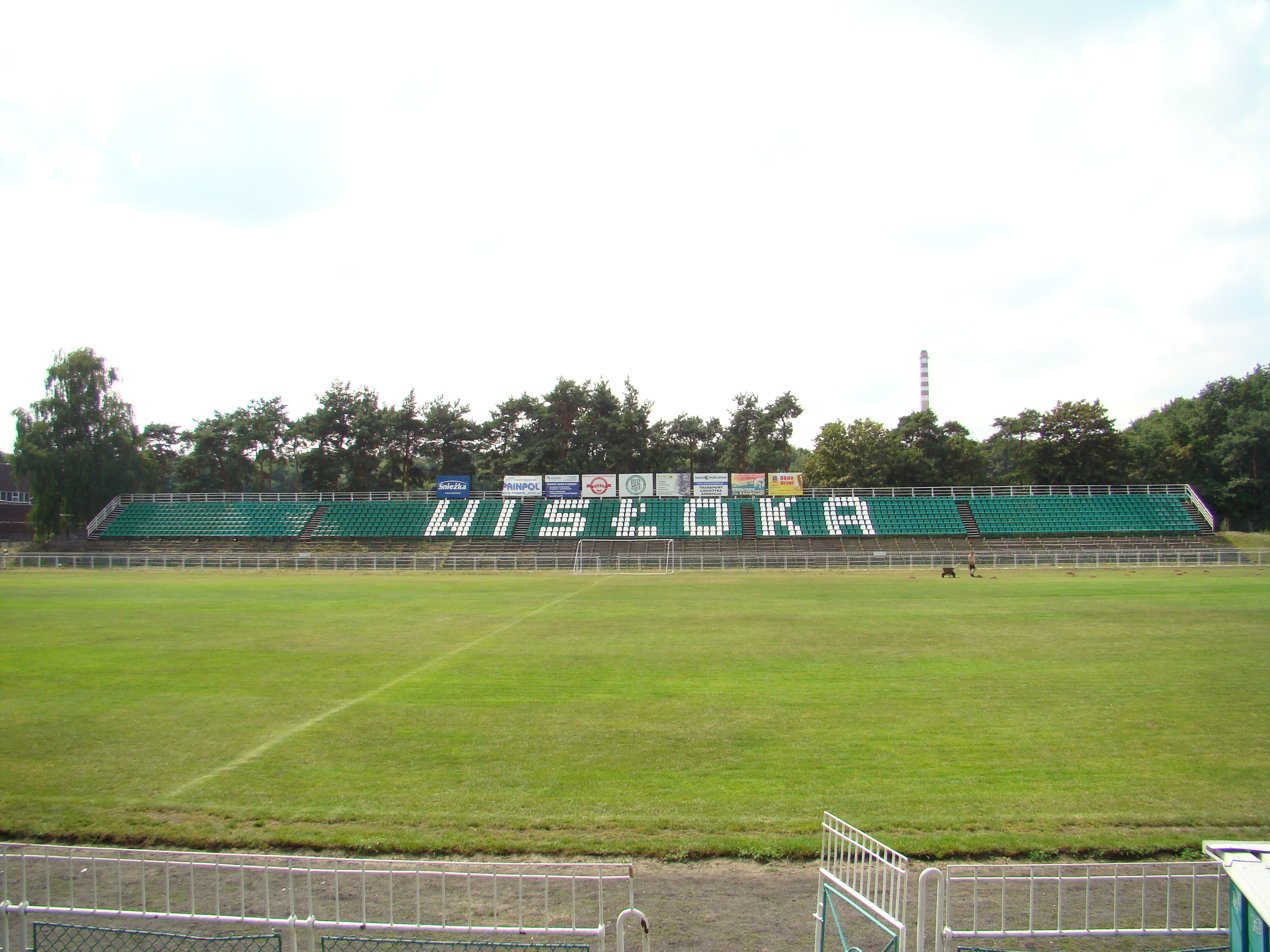
Wisloka's stadium, located at Parkowa Street 1 in Debica

First departments, opened in 1908/09, were bicycle-racing, track and field, and well as skating. Association football, the most popular of all sports in Poland, followed some time later – around 1909 (though there is no credible source to confirm this date). The best decade for the club were the 1970s, when its departments were separately sponsored by Dębica's main factories, and its athletes won medals during various national and international competitions. White-green athletes marked their presence on several sports arenas. However, since the 1990s, following a general slump in Polish sports, Wisłoka also has had many financial problems. There are few sponsors, and most of them are local businesses, whose financial means are limited. Therefore, most sports departments have been closed, except for football, wrestling and women volleyball.

== Supporters ==
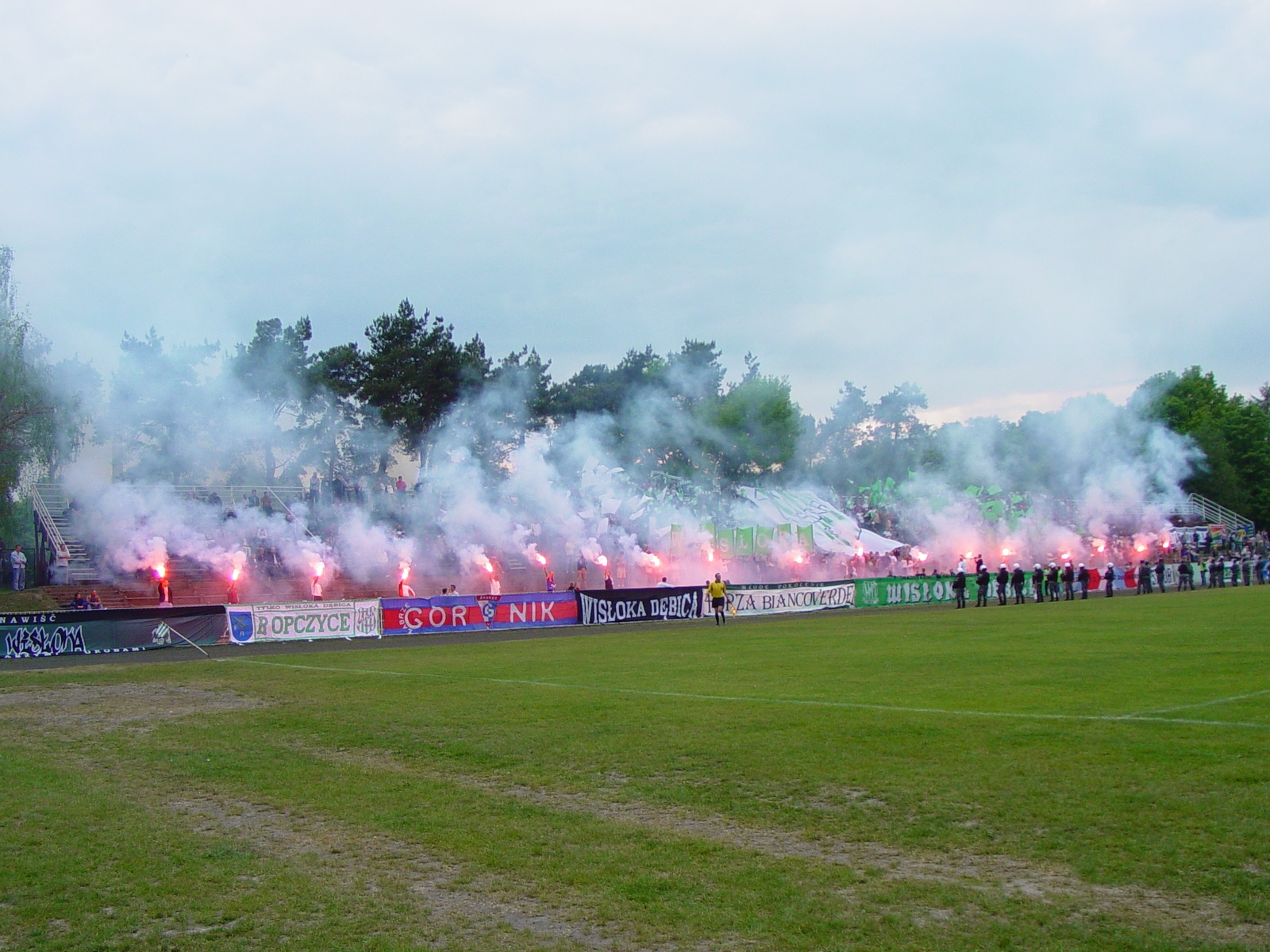
Wisloka's supporters during the local derby game vs. Igloopol Debica

Wisłoka is famous for its fans. Even in times when the club is struggling, the supporters of the club attend various games to show their support to the team and believe that the club will be not struggling soon. The fans' support still maintains a big following to this day – it is actually the supporters who put the seats in the stadium’s stands. In the mid-2000s, the fans created their own association, called Nasz KS, which financially supports the club. A very large factor of the success was the player Edward Kaczor.

Supporters of Wisłoka are allied with fans of two other clubs – Górnik Zabrze (since September 1988) and Siarka Tarnobrzeg (since November 2007). Their biggest rivals are local neighbours Igloopol Dębica with whom they contest the Dębica Derby.

== History ==
=== First years ===
During the first decades of Wisłoka's existence, its football players did not manage to achieve anything worth mentioning. In the 1920s and 1930s the team would play games against sides from Tarnów, Mielec, Rzeszów or Jasło. In the early 1930s, one of the best teams in Poland – Cracovia, came to Dębica for a friendly game. Players from Kraków did not treat this match seriously, as Wisłoka managed to tie against the famous rival. However, first 50 years of club's existence can be summarized as not very impressive. The most successful were late 1920s, when Wisłoka played in the regional B-Class of Tarnów, which is the equivalent of today's third division.

First successes in soccer came in the late 50s. Firstly, in 1957, now non-existent team Stal Dębica was promoted to the third division for one year. Four years later, Stal merged with Wisłoka, and in June 1963 the much stronger team emerged, that won games in Rzeszów's regional league, advancing six points before Czuwaj Przemysl. Then, in the play-offs for the national third division, Wisłoka came out as the third team and did not manage to earn promotion. Dębica's opponents included Victoria Jaworzno, Star Starachowice, Orzeł Rapid (which later became GKS Katowice) and Górnik Sosnowiec. In the mid-60s, favorite player of Wisłoka's supporters was the top-scorer Jerzy Maślanka. Even though he studied in Rzeszów, he always had enough time to come to Dębica and put on the white-green jersey. In 1966, Wisłoka's officials brought in a veteran midfielder Ludwik Poświat, who, as a 17-year-old, talented teenager, had won the Championships of Poland (in 1948, with Cracovia). He finished his career in 1972 and remained in Dębica, becoming a trainer of youth teams. Poświat died in 1976.

In the 1966–67 season, the team was expected to advance to the third tier. Wisłoka managed to do so, but not without problems. After fall season, Wisłoka was second, behind the reserve team of Stal Rzeszów. In the spring of 1967, they kept a streak of 12 consecutive games without a loss and won promotion.

=== Promotions to the second tier ===
Five years later, in the early summer of 1972, another promotion took place – this time to the II liga. Wisłoka finished first, five points ahead of CKS Czeladź. Wisłoka, sponsored by DZOS Stomil (today – Tire Company Dębica) spent seven years in the second division. They placed for most time in the mid-part of the table, only once – in 1975 – finishing on 5th position. In the 1978–79 season, in the first round Wisłoka was placed in the eighth position. Spring round, however, was a catastrophe. Dębica's favourites lost many games and as a result Wisłoka was relegated back to the III liga.

=== Relegation and lean years ===
After relegation, Wisłoka wanted to return to the second level as fast as possible. In the 1979–80 season, it was missed narrowly – they finished second, just after Stal Rzeszów. The 1980s were not as good as the 1970s. The team played at the third tier, group 8th (south-east Poland), for most time placing in the upper half of the table. Unfortunately, Wisłoka was not able to fight for promotion at the time. Apart from main team, there was also a reserve team, two junior and several youth teams. They played in regional games, also in a Ludwik Poświat U-19 Junior Tournament, which was organized every summer since 1979.

1987 proved to be disappointing, as Wisłoka was relegated to the fourth tier. This was a shock for both fans and officials. Some changes took place, after which the White and Greens returned to the third tier in June 1988, finishing before both BKS Bochnia and Okocimski Brzesko. In the 1988–89 season, the Polish Football Association rearranged the competition; instead of eight groups of the third division, four groups were created. Competition for Wisłoka became tougher, but they were able to keep themselves in safe spots.

=== Another promotion ===
In the 1990–91 season, Wisłoka again, after several years, won promotion to the II liga, group south, finishing ahead of Sandecja Nowy Sącz and Cracovia. The team, led by coach Jan Kasowicz during the whole season, proved its quality, winning 14 games, drawing 7, and losing only 3 (goals 40–13). In the second division Wisłoka was for the most time placing in the middle positions of the table. The highest location of seventh was achieved in the 1993–94 season. In June 1995 however, the team was relegated back to the regional level. In 1995-96 Wisłoka was second, just behind Wawel Kraków, in 1996–97, Dębica's favourites were second again, finishing after Czuwaj Przemyśl.

=== Four years in the fourth division and promotion in 2006 ===
In June 2001, Wisłoka was relegated even lower – to the fourth Podkarpacie division. In the 2004–05 season, Wisłoka was second, just behind Stal Sanok. At the end of the following 2005–06 campaign, the White and Greens finished on the first position in the league, three points ahead of Izolator Boguchwała, and won promotion to the third Division. In the 2006–07 season, Wisłoka played in the fourth group of the third tier and came off in the middle of the 16-team table. Next season was similar, after all games, Wisłoka was placed in the mid-table.

=== Polish Cup ===
Wisłoka, a team which has never managed to qualify to the first division, is an example of a club whose biggest successes are associated with the Polish Cup. Of many Wisłoka's games in the Cup of Poland throughout the years, two matches need mentioning. First is an edition in the soccer season 1988–1989. Second is Wisłoka's biggest-ever success so far – reaching as far as quarter-finals of the competition, which took place in the season 1992–93.

==== 1988–89 season ====
Wisłoka was at that time playing in the 3rd Regional Division, group 8th (south-east Poland). The team finished the season on the 8th position, just before the reserve team of Igloopol Dębica. On 24 July 1989, in the first round of the Cup of Poland, Wisłoka beat Glinik Gorlice 3–0. On 3 August 1989 Wisłoka defeated Radomiak Radom 2–0, and on 17 August 1989, Wisłoka beat Resovia Rzeszów 5–2. Finally, on 31 August 1989 Wisłoka Dębica tied 0–0, with Górnik Zabrze losing 4–5 on penalty shootout. Undoubtedly, this game was the biggest sports event in the history of the town. The stands were full – around 10,000 fans showed up (which made for around one-fourth of the town's population). As minutes passed by, more and more people started to chant songs and clap their hands. During final minutes of the game, the whole crowd was actively supporting Wisłoka.

==== 1992–93 season ====
In that season, Wisłoka played in the Eastern group of the second division, placing on the 12th position. On 12 August 1992, Wisłoka won an away game against Sandecja Nowy Sącz 4–2. On 26 August 1992, Wisłoka won another away game, achieving a 3–0 victory over Stal Mielec II. On 20 October 1992, Wisłoka beat Hutnik Kraków 2–1 at home. On 10 November 1992, Wisłoka headed to the town of Police, where they beat Chemik Police 3–2. Finally, in the quarterfinals of the Polish Cup, played on 10 and 23 March 1993, Wisłoka lost twice to Ruch Chorzów II; 0–1 at home, and 0–2 away. Officially, it was the reserve team that represented Ruch in this Cup campaign, but first team players were allowed to take part, and so they did. Ruch was represented by players such as Radosław Gilewicz, Waldemar Fornalik, Mariusz Śrutwa, Dariusz Gęsior, Jacek Bednarz, Piotr Mósor, among others. Nevertheless, the quarterfinals against Ruch were the biggest success in the history of Wisłoka's football team.

== Honours ==
- I liga
  - Fifth place: 1973–74
  - Participation: 1972 to 1979, 1991 to 1995
- Polish Cup
  - Quarter-finals: 1992–93

== Notable players ==
Most famous players who were taught soccer in Wisłoka are:

- Leszek Pisz – played for Legia Warsaw, winning the Polish Cup four times, two league titles and two Polish Super Cups, qualified to the quarter-finals of the UEFA Champions League (1994–95), and the semi-finals of European Cup of Winners' Cup (1990–91). Pisz was a key player and captain of Legia, he also played a few games for the Poland national team,
- Waldemar Piątek – played for Lech Poznań, he retired early due to health concerns. Piątek won the Polish Cup and Super Cup. In July 2004, Piatek was called up to the Poland national football team for a 1–1 Chicago draw against the United States, but spent the whole game on the bench.

== Other sports ==
Wisłoka's athletes excelled not only in soccer. In fact, the club's biggest successes are associated with a completely different sport – wrestling, Greco-Roman style. The wrestlers have won numerous medals, in all kinds of competitions. This is a short list of their main achievements:

=== Wrestling, Greco-Roman style ===
- Olympic Games:
  - Gold medalist – Kazimierz Lipień – Montreal 1976,
  - Silver medalist – Józef Lipień – Moscow 1980,
  - Bronze medalists – Kazimierz Lipień – Munich 1972 and Andrzej Skrzydlewski – Montreal 1976.
- World champions (gold medals only):
  - Józef Lipień – Teheran 1973,
  - Kazimierz Lipień – Teheran 1973,
  - Kazimierz Lipień – Katowice 1974,
  - Ryszard Świerad – Gothenburg 1981,
  - Roman Wrocławski – Katowice 1982
- European champions (gold medals only):
  - Jan Michalik – Katowice 1972,
  - Jan Michalik – Helsinki 1973,
  - Kazimierz Lipień – Ludwigsdorf 1975,
  - Kazimierz Lipień – Leningrad 1976,
  - Kazimierz Lipień – Oslo 1978,
  - Ryszard Świerad – Goeteborg 1981

=== Boxing ===
- European Championships
  - Silver medalist – Roman Gotfryd – Halle 1977,
  - Bronze medalist – Roman Gotfryd – Belgrade 1978.

=== Cycling ===
- Individual Championships of Poland:
  - Gold medalist – Andrzej Barszcz – Nysa 1991,
  - Bronze medalist – Stanislaw Czaja – Radom 1977.

=== Karate ===
- Championships of Poland:
  - Bronze medalist – Piotr Szczerba – Szczecin 1988,
  - Bronze medalist – Piotr Szczerba – Prudnik 1990,
  - Bronze medalist – Janusz Szeliga – Prudnik 1990,
  - Bronze medalist – Piotr Szczerba – Dębica 1991.
  - Bronze medalist – Tomasz Żelazny – Belchatow 1991.
