= Maciej Wolski =

Polish footballer

Personal information
- Date of birth: 29 March 1997 (age 29)
- Place of birth: Nowe Miasto Lubawskie, Poland
- Height: 1.76 m (5 ft 9 in)
- Positions: Right-back; right midfielder

Team information
- Current team: Polonia Bytom
- Number: 6

Youth career
- Drwęca NML
- 2008–2012: Jeziorak Iława
- 2012–2013: Stomil Olsztyn
- 2013–2014: Lechia Gdańsk

Senior career*
Years	Team	Apps	(Gls)
2014–2016	Lechia Gdańsk II	36	(2)
2016	→ Olimpia Grudziądz (loan)	3	(0)
2016–2018	Olimpia Grudziądz	15	(0)
2017	→ Drwęca NML (loan)	16	(1)
2018–2022	ŁKS Łódź	128	(8)
2022–2023	Stal Mielec	25	(0)
2023–2026	Bruk-Bet Termalica	76	(2)
2026–	Polonia Bytom	0	(0)
- * Club domestic league appearances and goals as of 21:39, 25 May 2026 (UTC)

Maciej Wolski (born 29 March 1997) is a Polish professional footballer for plays as either a right-back or a right midfielder for I liga club Polonia Bytom.

== Honours ==
Drwęca NML

- III liga, group I: 2016–17
