= Grzegorz Lech =

Polish footballer

Personal information
- Date of birth: 10 January 1983 (age 43)
- Place of birth: Kętrzyn, Poland
- Height: 1.80 m (5 ft 11 in)
- Position: Midfielder

Youth career
- Granica Kętrzyn
- 2000: Stomil Olsztyn

Senior career*
Years	Team	Apps	(Gls)
2001–2002	Stomil Olsztyn	9	(1)
2003–2004	Warmia i Mazury Olsztyn		
2004–2009	Stomil Olsztyn	55	(11)
2009	Dolcan Ząbki	19	(4)
2010–2014	Korona Kielce	53	(2)
2013–2014	→ Stomil Olsztyn (loan)	48	(11)
2014–2015	Arka Gdynia	20	(1)
2015–2020	Stomil Olsztyn	150	(34)

Managerial career
- 2024: Stomil Olsztyn
- 2024: Polonia Warsaw (caretaker)
- * Club domestic league appearances and goals

Grzegorz Lech (born 10 January 1983) is a Polish professional football manager and former player who played as a midfielder. He was most recently the assistant manager of Polonia Warsaw.

He retired in September 2020 and was named Stomil Olsztyn's chairman shortly after. He held his position until the end of the 2020–21 season.

== Honours ==
Individual

- I liga Team of the Season: 2018–19

== Managerial statistics ==
As of match played 23 August 2024

Managerial record by team and tenure
Team	From	To	Record							
Team	From	To	G	W	D	L	GF	GA	GD	Win %
Stomil Olsztyn	14 March 2024	11 June 2024	11	2	4	5	9	11	−2	18.18
Polonia Warsaw (caretaker)	13 August 2024	25 August 2024	3	1	0	2	2	2	+0	33.33
Total			14	3	4	7	11	13	−2	21.43
