= Maciej Ambrosiewicz =

Polish footballer

Personal information
- Full name: Maciej Ambrosiewicz
- Date of birth: 24 May 1998 (age 28)
- Place of birth: Gdynia, Poland
- Height: 1.84 m (6 ft 1/2 in)
- Position: Midfielder

Team information
- Current team: Arka Gdynia
- Number: 28

Youth career
- –2014: Arka Gdynia
- 2014–2016: MFK Karviná

Senior career*
Years	Team	Apps	(Gls)
2016–2019	Górnik Zabrze	69	(1)
2017–2019	Górnik Zabrze II	13	(3)
2019–2020	Wisła Płock	24	(0)
2021–2022	Zagłębie Sosnowiec	36	(3)
2022–2026	Bruk-Bet Termalica	137	(13)
2026–	Arka Gdynia	0	(0)

International career
2017–2019	Poland U20	4	(0)
2018–2019	Poland U21	6	(0)
- * Club domestic league appearances and goals as of 21:33, 25 May 2026 (UTC)

Maciej Ambrosiewicz (born 24 May 1998) is a Polish professional footballer who plays as a midfielder for I liga club Arka Gdynia.

== Club career ==
Ambrosiewicz started his professional career with Górnik Zabrze.

On 21 August 2019, Ambrosiewicz joined Ekstraklasa club Wisła Płock on a two-year deal.
