= Artem Putivtsev =

Ukrainian footballer

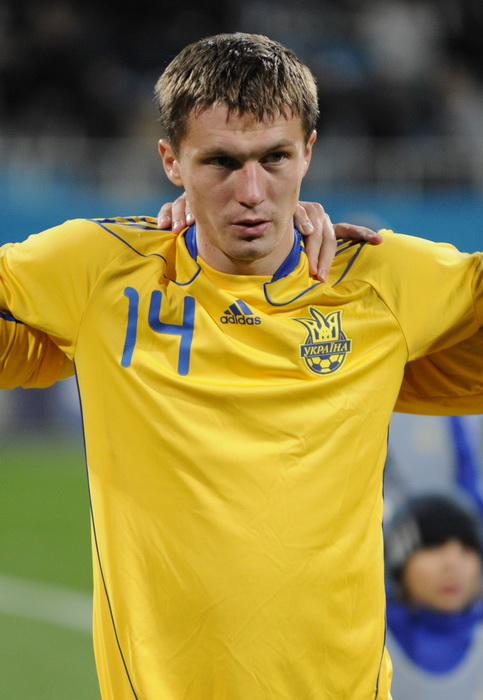
- Putivtsev with Ukraine U21 in 2010

Personal information
- Full name: Artem Oleksandrovych Putivtsev
- Date of birth: 29 August 1988 (age 38)
- Place of birth: Kharkiv, Ukrainian SSR
- Height: 1.89 m (6 ft 2 1/2 in)
- Position: Centre-back

Team information
- Current team: Bruk-Bet Termalica Nieciecza
- Number: 77

Youth career
- 2003–2005: UFK Kharkiv

Senior career*
Years	Team	Apps	(Gls)
2006–2011	Metalist Kharkiv	6	(0)
2007	→ Hazovyk-KhGV Kharkiv (loan)	16	(2)
2008	→ Zirka Kirovohrad (loan)	17	(2)
2010–2011	→ Illichivets Mariupol (loan)	24	(2)
2011–2014	Illichivets Mariupol	63	(0)
2014–2015	Metalurh Donetsk	17	(0)
2015–2016	Metalist Kharkiv	14	(1)
2016–	Bruk-Bet Termalica	272	(18)

International career
2010–2011	Ukraine U21	6	(1)
2016	Ukraine	1	(0)
- * Club domestic league appearances and goals as of 00:14, 26 May 2026 (UTC)

Artem Putivtsev (Ukrainian: Артем Олександрович Путівцев; born 29 August 1988) is a Ukrainian professional footballer who plays as a centre-back for I liga club Bruk-Bet Termalica Nieciecza.

== Club career ==
Myron Markevych promoted Putivtsev to the senior team of Metalist Kharkiv for the 2009–10 season.

== International career ==
Putivtsev was called up by Ukraine U21 and played for the team at 2011 UEFA European Under-21 Championship.

== Personal life ==
On 15 October 2021, after staying in the country for over five years, Putivtsev obtained Polish citizenship.

== Career statistics ==
=== International ===
Appearances and goals by national team and year
National team	Year	Apps	Goals
Ukraine
Ukraine	2016	1	0
Total		1	0
