= Jakub Nowakowski (footballer) =

Polish footballer (born 2001)

Personal information
- Date of birth: 11 October 2001 (age 25)
- Place of birth: Radom, Poland
- Height: 1.76 m (5 ft 9 in)
- Position: Midfielder

Team information
- Current team: ŁKS Łomża

Youth career
- 2011–2017: Radomiak Radom

Senior career*
Years	Team	Apps	(Gls)
2017–2023	Radomiak Radom	22	(0)
2020	→ Bytovia Bytów (loan)	16	(0)
2023–2025	Bruk-Bet Termalica	31	(3)
2025–2026	Znicz Pruszków	7	(0)
2026–	ŁKS Łomża	0	(0)
- * Club domestic league appearances and goals as of 16:18, 26 May 2026 (UTC)

Jakub Nowakowski (born 11 October 2001) is a Polish professional footballer who plays as a midfielder for III liga club ŁKS Łomża.

He is best known for the time at his hometown club Radomiak, where he came through the youth academy.

== Early life ==
Nowakowski began with early accomplishments in running before transitioning fully into football, and was raised in a family with a strong interest in football.

Nowakowski's first competitive success came in running rather than football. As a young student, he was part of a school relay team that achieved third place in a national race. Each member ran 1 km, and Nowakowski typically ran the third leg. His team consistently placed highly in regional competitions, and this early achievement earned him his first medal, marking the start of his involvement in organised sports.

== Club career ==
=== Beginnings at Radomiak ===
Nowakowski was introduced to football by his family. His uncle had played for Radomiak Radom at the third-league level, and his grandfather, a football enthusiast, encouraged Nowakowski's involvement in the sport. He began training around age five or six, initially practicing with an older age group before moving to his own age group under coach Maciej Lesisz. Although he enjoyed playing as a goalkeeper in informal settings, his coaches guided him toward other positions. He transitioned from forward to midfield, where he eventually settled.

Over the years, he collected 14 trophies, primarily Best Player awards, with one for top scorer, demonstrating his inclination for playmaking rather than scoring.

==== Loan to Bytovia Bytów ====
In February 2022, Nowakowski joined Bytovia Bytów on loan, marking his first experience outside of Radomiak. Bytovia offered him the opportunity to live independently and initially; he lived in shared housing with other teammates, later moving into his own apartment.

==== Brief stint with GKS Bełchatów ====
Following his time with Bytovia, Nowakowski's former coach Kamil Socha invited him to train with GKS Bełchatów, where he joined pre-season training and participated in friendly matches. However, the club encountered financial issues shortly before the season began and due to these issues, GKS Bełchatów was unable to proceed with the transfer, withdrawing from the league. This development allowed Nowakowski to return to Radomiak, while other players sought new teams, often in lower leagues.

==== First team breakthrough ====
Nowakowski made his debut for Radomiak's first team in the Polish Cup against Elana Toruń on 25 September 2019.

On 29 April 2022, Nowakowski made his Ekstraklasa debut in an away match against Górnik Zabrze. Coach Mariusz Lewandowski informed him the day before the game that he would be starting. As he continued to gain playing time in the league, he became a regular player in the top-tier.

=== Bruk-Bet Termalica ===
At the end of 2023, Nowakowski was set to leave Radom, and close to joining GKS Tychy, however on 28 June 2023 he moved to another second-tier club Bruk-Bet Termalica Nieciecza.

He left Bruk-Bet Termalica upon the expiration of his contract on 30 June 2025.

=== Znicz Pruszków ===
On 7 July 2025, Nowakowski joined I liga club Znicz Pruszków on a season-long contract.

=== ŁKS Łomża ===
On 5 November 2026, Nowakowski signed with III liga side ŁKS Łomża.

== Personal life ==
Throughout his career, Nowakowski has maintained a strong connection to Radomiak, a team he supported from an early age. As a child, he often attended games with friends, drawn to the energy of the fans and atmosphere in the stands.

One of his favorite players growing up was Nigerian forward Samuelson Odunka, known for his dribbling skills. Nowakowski admired the technical skill and control of the likes of Ronaldinho and Lionel Messi, players who influenced him.
