= Piotr Mandrysz =

Polish footballer (born 1962)

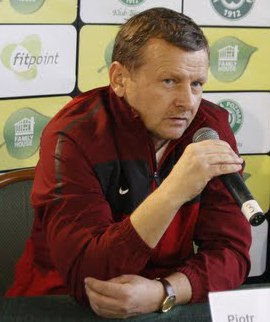
- Mandrysz in 2012

Personal information
- Date of birth: 21 September 1962 (age 64)
- Place of birth: Rybnik, Poland
- Height: 1.72 m (5 ft 8 in)
- Position: Defender

Senior career*
Years	Team	Apps	(Gls)
1982–1990	ROW 1964 Rybnik		
1986	→ GKS Jastrzębie (loan)		
1990–1992	Zagłębie Sosnowiec	37	(3)
1992	Naprzód Rydułtowy		
1992–1994	Pogoń Szczecin	65	(14)
1994–1995	St. Pölten		
1995–1996	Raków Częstochowa	14	(5)
1996–1999	Pogoń Szczecin		
1999–2000	Śląsk Wrocław		
2000–2002	RKS Radomsko		

Managerial career
- 2000–2002: RKS Radomsko (player-manager)
- 2002–2003: Ruch Chorzów
- 2003–2004: Arka Gdynia
- 2005–2006: Odra Wodzisław II
- 2006–2007: Beskid Skoczów
- 2007–2008: Piast Gliwice
- 2008–2010: Pogoń Szczecin
- 2011–2013: GKS Tychy
- 2014–2016: Bruk-Bet Termalica Nieciecza
- 2016: Zagłębie Sosnowiec
- 2017–2018: GKS Katowice
- 2019: Bruk-Bet Termalica Nieciecza
- 2020: Sandecja Nowy Sącz
- 2024–2026: ROW 1964 Rybnik
- * Club domestic league appearances and goals

Piotr Mandrysz (born 21 September 1962) is a Polish professional football manager and former player who played as a defender. He was most recently in charge of ROW 1964 Rybnik.

== Honours ==
Beskid Skoczów

- Polish Cup (Skoczów regionals): 2006–07

ROW Rybnik

- Polish Cup (Rybnik regionals): 2024–25
