= Nieciecza =

- Village
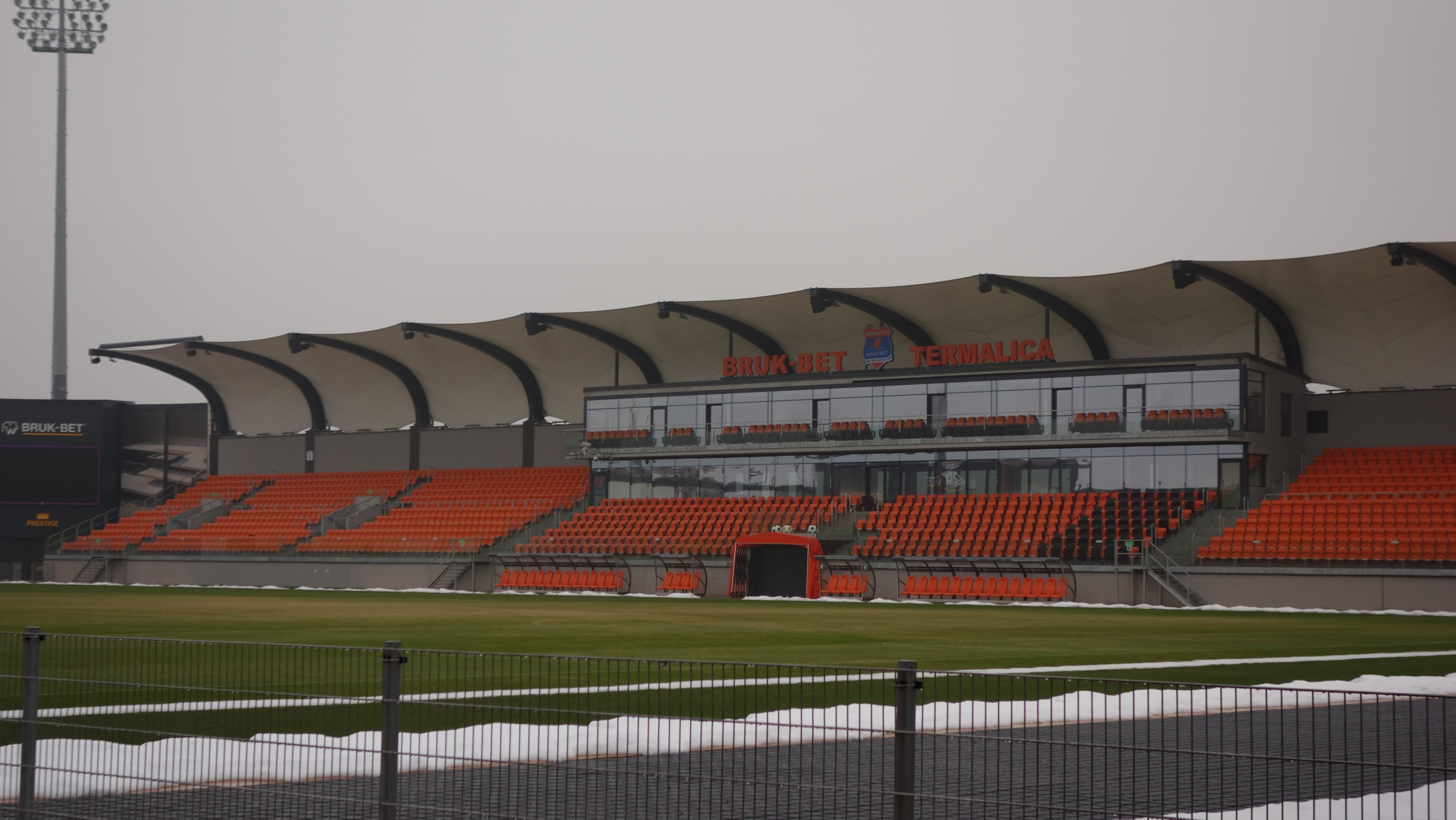
- Stadion Sportowy Bruk-Bet Termalica

- Location within Poland
- Coordinates: 50°9′N 20°51′E
- Country: Poland
- Voivodeship: Lesser Poland
- County: Tarnów
- Gmina: Żabno
- Population: 750
- Time zone: UTC+1 (CET)
  - Summer (DST): UTC+2 (CEST)
- Vehicle registration: KTA
- Website: NIECIECZA.PL

Nieciecza [ɲɛˈt͡ɕɛt͡ʂa] is a village in the administrative district of Gmina Żabno, within Tarnów County, Lesser Poland Voivodeship, in southern Poland.

== Geography ==
It is situated on the right bank of the Dunajec River, a tributary of the Vistula.

== History ==
According to medieval Polish chronicler Jan Długosz, in the 15th century, the village was owned by castellan Jan Rabsztyński of Topór coat of arms. In the late 19th century, the village had a population of 541. A volunteer fire department was established in 1903. In 1915, a theater and choir ensemble was founded in Nieciecza. It participated in patriotic, anniversary, church, and occasional events in various places in the region, and in choir competitions. The local football club, now known as Bruk-Bet Termalica Nieciecza, was founded in 1922.

During the German invasion of Poland, which started World War II, 13 Polish soldiers of the 12th Infantry Regiment were killed in a battle fought in Nieciecza on 8 September 1939. There is a monument dedicated to the Polish defenders in the village. During the German occupation, the occupiers used the local football pitch as a military training ground. In 1945, the occupation ended and the village was restored to Poland.

== Sports ==
The village is the home of Bruk-Bet Termalica Nieciecza, a professional football club founded in 1922. In May 2015, after securing the second place in the I liga, the club reached the Ekstraklasa for the first time in its history. With Nieciecza's population of 750, it is the club from the smallest village in history to qualify for a top-level football league in Europe and the only club from a village to qualify for the Polish top football league.

== Religion ==
There is a Catholic parish church of Our Lady Queen of Poland in Nieciecza.
