= Jakub Wróbel =

Polish footballer (born 1993)

Personal information
- Date of birth: 30 July 1993 (age 33)
- Place of birth: Dąbrowa Tarnowska, Poland
- Height: 1.78 m (5 ft 10 in)
- Position: Forward

Team information
- Current team: Bruk-Bet Termalica
- Number: 12

Youth career
- –2010: Unia Tarnów

Senior career*
Years	Team	Apps	(Gls)
2010–2012	MLKS Żabno		
2012–2013	Unia Tarnów	31	(11)
2013–2018	Bruk-Bet Termalica	14	(0)
2013–2014	→ Siarka Tarnobrzeg (loan)	27	(7)
2015–2016	→ Siarka Tarnobrzeg (loan)	13	(1)
2018	Radomiak Radom	13	(2)
2018–2019	Garbarnia Kraków	14	(5)
2019–2020	GKS Jastrzębie	30	(12)
2020	ŁKS Łódź	14	(0)
2020–2021	Stal Mielec	8	(0)
2021	→ Resovia (loan)	16	(3)
2021–2022	Resovia	29	(1)
2022–2024	Sandecja Nowy Sącz	47	(8)
2024–	Bruk-Bet Termalica	30	(2)
2024–	Bruk-Bet Termalica II	34	(45)
- * Club domestic league appearances and goals as of 12:37, 28 June 2026 (UTC)

Jakub Wróbel (born 30 July 1993) is a Polish professional footballer who plays as a forward for I liga club Bruk-Bet Termalica Nieciecza.

== Club career ==
On 24 August 2020, he joined Stal Mielec.

== Honours ==
Unia Tarnów

- III liga Lesser Poland-Świętokrzyskie: 2011–12

Bruk-Bet Termalica II

- Polish Cup (Żabno regionals): 2024–25, 2025–26
