= Stadion Sportowy Bruk-Bet Termalica =

Football stadium in Nieciecza, Poland

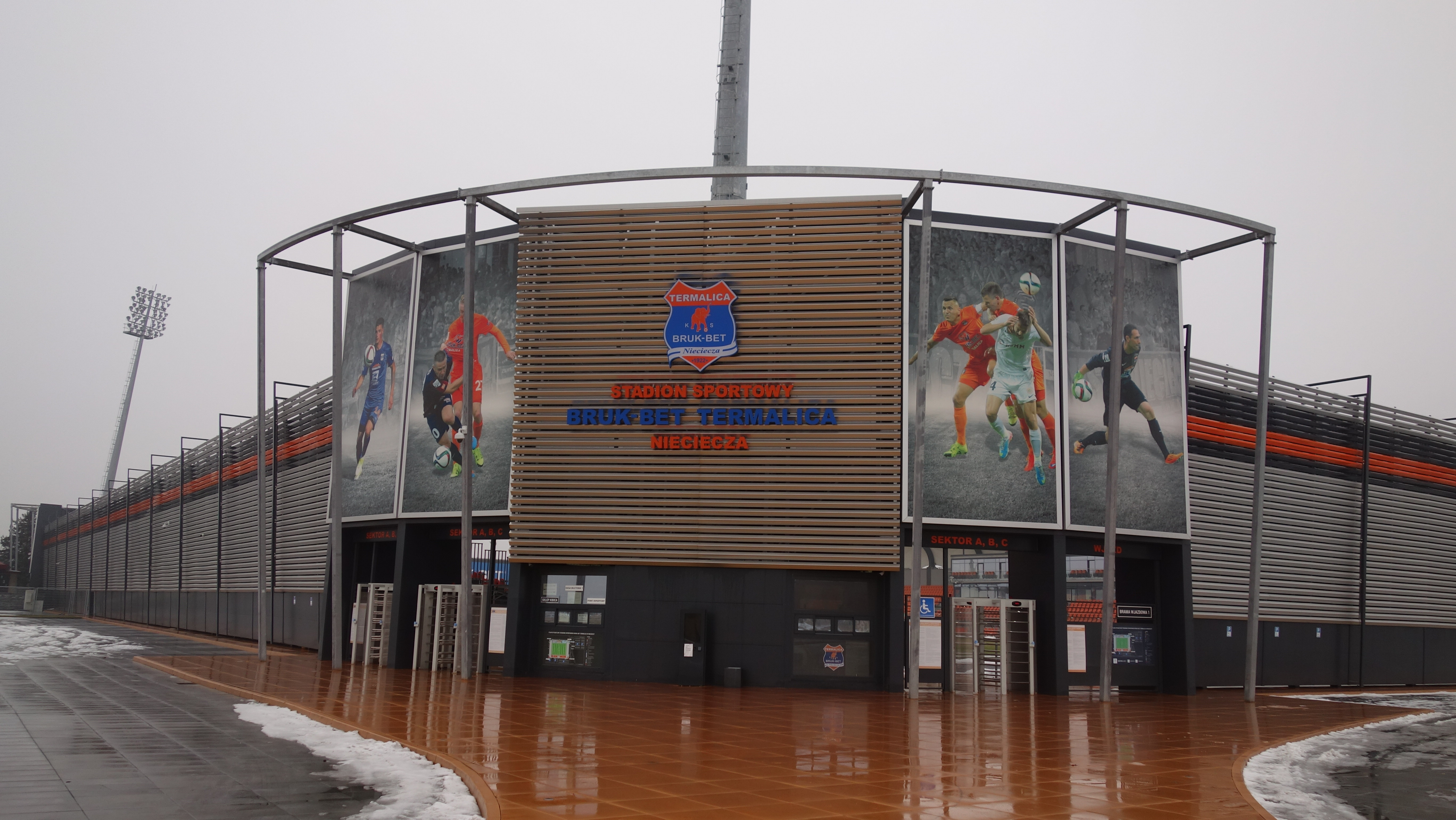
- Interactive map of Stadion Sportowy Bruk-Bet Termalica
- Full name: Stadion Sportowy Bruk-Bet Termalica
- Location: Nieciecza, Poland
- Coordinates: 50°9′30.1″N 20°50′56.97″E
- Owner: Bruk-Bet Termalica Nieciecza
- Capacity: 2,262 (2007); 4,666 (2015); 4,595 (2016); 4,653 (2021)
- Surface: Natural
- Scoreboard: LED
- Field size: 105 m x 68 m

Construction
- Built: 2007
- Opened: 26 August 2007
- Renovated: 2015

Tenants
- Bruk-Bet Termalica Nieciecza; Sandecja Nowy Sącz (2017–2018)

Website
- http://www.termalica.brukbet.com/nowa/stadion

The Bruk-Bet Termalica Sports Stadium (Polish: Stadion Sportowy Bruk-Bet Termalica) is a football stadium in Nieciecza, Poland. It serves as the home ground of Bruk-Bet Termalica Nieciecza. The stadium was built in 2007. In accordance with Ekstraklasa regulations, the club expanded the stadium to accommodate at least 4,666 spectators. The first match at the renovated stadium took place during the 16th round of 2015–16 Ekstraklasa season, against Piast Gliwice.

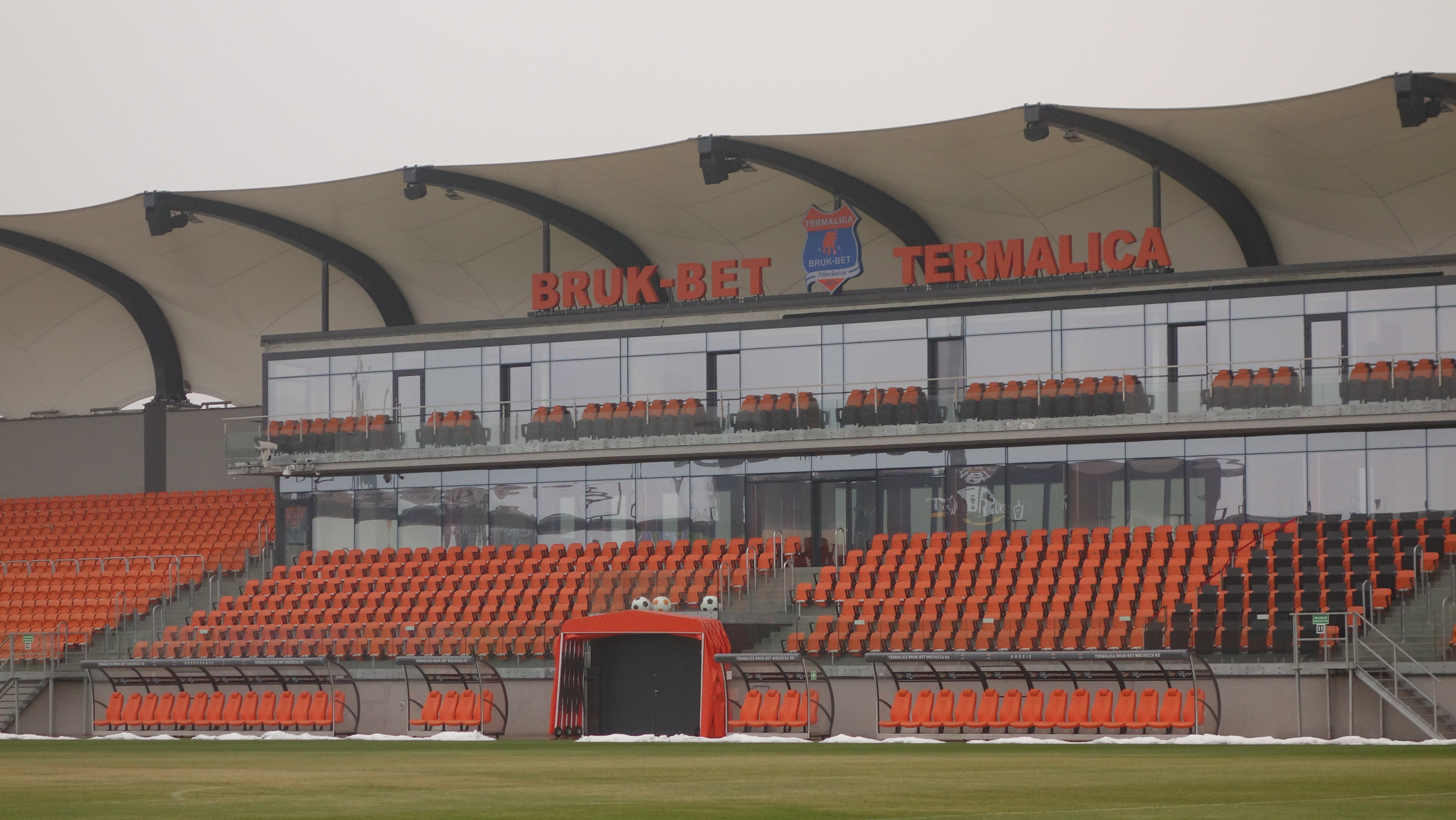
Stadion Sportowy Bruk-Bet Termalica

== See also ==
- List of football stadiums in Poland
