= Bruk-Bet Termalica Nieciecza =

Association football club in Poland

Coordinates: 50.15°N 20.85°E

- Full name: Bruk-Bet Termalica Nieciecza Klub Sportowy Spółka Akcyjna
- Nicknames: Słoniki (The Elephants); Szaleni wieśniacy (Crazy villagers)
- Founded: 1922; 104 years ago
- Ground: Stadion Sportowy Bruk-Bet Termalica
- Capacity: 4,595
- Chairman: Danuta Witkowska
- Manager: Marcin Brosz
- League: I liga
- 2025–26: Ekstraklasa, 18th of 18 (relegated)
- Website: www.termalica.brukbet.com
Home colours	Away colours	Third colours

Bruk-Bet Termalica Nieciecza Klub Sportowy Spółka Akcyjna, commonly referred to as Bruk-Bet Termalica Nieciecza (Polish pronunciation: [ˈbruɡbɛt tɛrmaˈlika ɲɛˈt͡ɕɛt͡ʂa]), is a Polish professional football club based in Nieciecza. The team competes in the I liga, the second tier of the Polish football league system, following their 2025–26 Ekstraklasa relegation.

== History ==
The team was established in 1922. The club was founded after World War II and took over the previously existing team. The team's official colours are orange and blue. In May 2015, after securing the second place in the I liga, the club reached the Ekstraklasa for the first time in its history.

With Nieciecza's population at 750, it holds the record for the smallest town or village in the history of Polish football that has had its representative in the highest division of Polish football.

In 2021, they had finished as the I liga runners-up and won the promotion to the Ekstraklasa, for the second time in their history.

== Club names ==
- From 1946 – LZS Nieciecza
- From 2004 – LKS Nieciecza
- From the spring round of the 2004–05 season – LKS Bruk-Bet Nieciecza
- From the 2009–10 season – Bruk-Bet Nieciecza
- From 17 June 2010 – Termalica Bruk-Bet Nieciecza KS
- From the 2016–17 season – Bruk-Bet Termalica Nieciecza KS

== Honours ==
- I liga
  - Runners-up: 2014–15, 2020–21, 2024–25
- II liga
  - Champions: 2009–10
- III liga, group G
  - Runners-up: 2008–09
- IV liga Lesser Poland
  - Third place: 2007–08
- V liga Nowy Sącz-Tarnów
  - Champions: 2006–07
- Klasa A Tarnów III
  - Champions: 2003–04

== Players ==
=== Current squad ===
As of 15 September 2026

Note: Flags indicate national team as defined under FIFA eligibility rules; some limited exceptions apply. Players may hold more than one non-FIFA nationality.

No.	Pos.	Nation	Player
1	GK	SVK	Adrián Chovan
4	DF	POL	Albert Zarówny
5	DF	ARG	Lucas Masoero
8	MF	POL	Rafał Kurzawa
9	FW	ESP	Jesús Jiménez
10	MF	POL	Miłosz Drąg
11	FW	POL	Oliwier Sławiński
12	FW	POL	Jakub Wróbel
13	MF	POL	Krzysztof Kubica
15	MF	POL	Sebastian Dąbrowski
16	DF	POL	Miłosz Kozik
17	FW	POL	Dominik Biniek
19	FW	CRO	Ivan Durdov
20	DF	POL	Maciej Jaroszewski
21	MF	POL	Damian Hilbrycht

No.	Pos.	Nation	Player
23	MF	ESP	Sergio Guerrero
25	FW	POL	Kamil Zapolnik (captain)
26	MF	POL	Wojciech Jakubik
27	DF	ROU	Radu Boboc
29	DF	POL	Kacper Surowiec
44	DF	POL	Michał Synoś (on loan from Górnik Zabrze)
50	DF	UKR	Yevgen Opanasenko
55	DF	BRA	Thiago Dombroski
66	MF	POL	Patryk Olejnik
76	GK	POL	Eric Topór
77	DF	UKR	Artem Putivtsev
88	GK	POL	Mikołaj Molga
—	MF	POL	Karol Drelicharz
—	MF	POL	Paweł Surowiec
—	DF	POL	Antoni Wrona

=== Out on loan ===
Note: Flags indicate national team as defined under FIFA eligibility rules; some limited exceptions apply. Players may hold more than one non-FIFA nationality.

No.	Pos.	Nation	Player
24	GK	POL	Maciej Janicki (at AKS 1947 Busko Zdrój until 30 June 2027)
—	MF	POL	Jakub Różycki (at AKS 1947 Busko Zdrój until 30 June 2027)

=== Notable players ===
Had international caps for their respective countries. Players marked in bold have had caps while playing for Bruk-Bet Termalica.

Poland

- (Poland) Rafał Kurzawa (2025–)
- (Poland) Szymon Pawłowski (2017–18)
- (Poland) Dawid Plizga (2015–16)
- (Poland) Michał Skóraś (2018–19)

Belarus

- (Belarus) **Pavel Pavlyuchenko** (2022–23)

Bosnia and Herzegovina

- (Bosnia and Herzegovina) Vlastimir Jovanović (2016–2025)

Czech Republic

- (Czech Republic) Mario Lička (2015)
- (Czech Republic) Tomáš Poznar (2022–23)

Finland

- (Finland) Joona Toivio (2018)
- (Finland) Jasse Tuominen (2024)

Hungary

- (Hungary) Roland Varga (2022)

Iceland

- (Iceland) Árni Vilhjálmsson (2018–19)

Latvia

- (Latvia) **Vladislavs Gutkovskis** (2016–20)
- (Latvia) Vitālijs Maksimenko (2017–18)

Lebanon

- (Lebanon) Feiz Shamsin (2020)

Romania

- (Romania) Gabriel Iancu (2017–18)

Slovakia

- (Slovakia) Ľuboš Hajdúch (2011)
- (Slovakia) Ján Mucha (2017–18)

Slovenia

- (Slovenia) Rajko Rep (2022–24)

Ukraine

- (Ukraine) **Artem Putivtsev** (2016–)

== Managerial history ==
Caretaker managers listed in italics.

- (Poland) Marcin Jałocha (1 July 2006 – 20 September 2010)
- (Poland) Mirosław Hajdo (20 September 2010 – 7 May 2011)
- (Poland) Piotr Wrześniak (8 May 2011 – 14 June 2011)
- (Slovakia) Dušan Radolský (14 June 2011 – 28 May 2012)
- (Poland) Kazimierz Moskal (14 June 2012 – 12 June 2013)
- (Slovakia) Dušan Radolský (25 June 2013 – 20 October 2013)
- (Poland) Mirosław Jabłoński (23 October 2013 – 12 November 2013)
- (Poland) Krzysztof Lipecki (12 November 2013 – 6 January 2014)
- (Poland) Piotr Mandrysz (6 January 2014 – 30 June 2016)
- (Poland) Czesław Michniewicz (1 July 2016 – 22 March 2017)
- (Poland) Marcin Węglewski (27 March 2017 – 30 June 2017)
- (Poland) Mariusz Rumak (1 July 2017 – 19 September 2017)
- (Poland) Maciej Bartoszek (20 September 2017 – 20 February 2018)
- (Poland) Jacek Zieliński (20 February 2018 – 17 September 2018)
- (Poland) Marcin Kaczmarek (17 September 2018 – 30 June 2019)
- (Poland) Piotr Mandrysz (1 July 2019 – 13 November 2019)
- (Poland) Waldemar Piątek (13 November 2019 – 8 January 2020)
- (Poland) Mariusz Lewandowski (8 January 2020 – 13 December 2021)
- (Poland) Waldemar Piątek (13 December 2021 – 6 January 2022)
- (Poland) Michał Probierz (6 January 2022 – 8 January 2022)
- (Czech Republic) Radoslav Látal (10 January 2022 – 30 June 2023)
- (Poland) Mariusz Lewandowski (1 July 2023 – 11 March 2024)
- (Poland) Jakub Drwal (15 March 2024 – 19 March 2024)
- (Poland) Marcin Brosz (19 March 2024 – present)

== League results ==
Season	League	Position	Points	Goals	Notes
1998–99	Klasa A (group: Tarnów III)	7	24	25–29	
1999–2000	Klasa A (group: Tarnów III)	5	40	36–32	
2000–01	Klasa A (group: Tarnów III)	3	50	62–34	
2001–02	Klasa A (group: Żabno)	3	51	52–29	
2002–03	Klasa A (group: Tarnów III)	2	58	82–30	
2003–04	Klasa A (group: Tarnów III)	1	73	101–21	promotion
2004–05	Regional league (group: Tarnów)	2	73	74–20	
2005–06	Regional league (group: Tarnów)	2	80	118–17	
2006–07	V liga (group: Nowy Sącz-Tarnów)	1	78	79–14	promotion
2007–08	IV liga (group: małopolska)	3	73	69–30	
2008–09	III liga (group: małopolsko-świętokrzyska)	2	64	57–20	promotion
2009–10	II liga (East)	1	72	56–21	promotion
2010–11	I liga	14	37	40–53	
2011–12	I liga	5	56	42–26	
2012–13	I liga	3	64	54–28	
2013–14	I liga	5	53	42–33	
2014–15	I liga	2	69	56–23	promotion
2015–16	Ekstraklasa	13	26	39–50	
2016–17	Ekstraklasa	8	25	35–55	
2017–18	Ekstraklasa	15	36	39–66	relegation
2018–19	I liga	8	46	45–46	
2019–20	I liga	6	50	47–34	
2020–21	I liga	2	65	56–28	promotion
2021–22	Ekstraklasa	16	32	36–56	relegation
2022–23	I liga	3	61	55–37	
2023–24	I liga	14	41	56–52	
2024–25	I liga	2	71	70–39	promotion
2025–26	Ekstraklasa	18	34	43–65	relegation

Legend
Color indication
I league tier
II league tier
III league tier
IV league tier
V league tier
VI league tier
