= Wie is de Mol? (Dutch TV series) season 5 =

Dutch reality television season

Wie is de Mol?
- Season 5
- Presented by: Angela Groothuizen
- No. of days: 16
- No. of contestants: 10
- Winner: Marc-Marie Huijbregts
- Runner-up: Lottie Hellingman
- Location: Australia; Bali, Indonesia
- The Mole: Yvon Jaspers
- No. of episodes: 10

Release
- Original network: AVROTROS
- Original release: January 14 – March 16, 2005

Season chronology
- ← Previous; Season 4: Canada Next → Season 6: Argentina

The fifth season of the Dutch TV series Wie is de Mol? ("Who is the Mole?") aired in the winter of 2005. After the series took a year off the air, Angela Groothuizen returned to host her final season. The season took place in Australia, returning to the first country the series visited, and the island of Bali in Indonesia. The season premiered on January 14, 2005. The Reunion aired on March 18, 2005 where Marc-Marie Huijbregts was declared the winner of the season, earning a grand total of €23,000.-. Huijbregts, alongside his runner-up Lottie Hellingman, had successfully unmasked Yvon Jaspers as the Mole of 2005.

== Format ==
Followed the same format as its Belgian predecessor, this was the first season which had ten Dutch celebrities travel to Australia and Bali, Indonesia to complete Assignments to earn money for the group pot. However, one of the ten is the titular Mole (de Mol), the one designated to sabotage the assignments and cause the group to earn the least amount of money for the winner's pot as possible. Every few days, players would take a 20-question multiple choice test about the identity of the Mole. Once the test is complete, the candidates await their results in an Execution ceremony. The candidate with the worst score is executed from the game, while in the event of the tie the candidate who completed their test the slowest is executed. The season plays out until there are three remaining candidates, where they must complete a final test (consisting of 40 questions). The candidate with the highest score, or had completed their test the fastest in a tie, is declared the winner and receives the group's pot.

Two twists were implemented throughout the season, where at every Execution Ceremony, Angela would reveal the percent of questions that candidates got correct about the Mole. After from the second test onwards, if the candidates had a smaller percentage of correct answers than the previous test, two candidates would be executed from the game instead of one. The Double Execution would only happen once throughout the season, if the candidates had failed to keep their percent up.

Secondly, Candidates were approached over the phone via a messager [sic?] from the Mole throughout the season. At every opportunity, if the Candidates accepted the Mole's offer to sabotage assignments, they would automatically earn 5 correct answers on their next test, regardless of how they performed in the tests.

== Candidates ==
Name	Occupation	Day Exited	Result
Yvon Jaspers	Television Presenter, Actress.	16	The Mole
Marc-Marie Huijbregts	Cabaret Actor	16	Winner
Lottie Hellingman	Actress, Singer	16	Runner-Up
Isabelle Brinkman	Television Presenter	15	3rd place
Sander de Heer	Radio DJ Presenter	12	4th place
Gijs Staverman	Radio DJ Presenter	10	5th place
Jim de Groot	Actor, Musician	10	5th place
Victoria Koblenko	Actress	8	7th place
Yvonne van den Hurk	Actress	6	8th place
Roeland Fernhout	Actor	5	Withdrew
the result in grey indicates the Mole

== Candidates Progress ==
The order in which the candidates learned their results are indicated in the table below.

Summary of candidates progress in each episode
Candidate	1 (Note: Instead of executing one of the candidates, after showing everyone's green screen, a Percentage popped up instead of Yvon's results. Angela then explained that the Percentage represented how many questions the entire group got correct about the Mole in their tests. Over the rest of the season, if the group's percentage dropped below their previous test's score, two candidates would be executed instead of one.)	2	3 (Note: Roeland had been sick throughout the game, and after a consultation with a doctor, it was advised that he withdraw and return home to recover.)	4	5	6 (Note: As the group earned a lower percentage of correct answers than the previous test, two candidates were executed after this test. Gijs and Jim were executed together.)	7	8	Finale
Marc-Marie	Non; Execution	3rd	Execution; Cancelled		6th	3rd	2nd		Winner
Yvon	Non; Execution		Execution; Cancelled	3rd	3rd			exempt	The Mole
Lottie	Non; Execution	2nd	Execution; Cancelled		exempt	1st	1st		Runner-Up
Isabelle	Non; Execution		Execution; Cancelled	2nd	2nd	4th		Executed	
Sander	Non; Execution	1st	Execution; Cancelled		4th	5th	Executed		
Gijs	Non; Execution	Executed (Note: In Episode 3, the Candidates successfully guessed that Gijs was behind the Mystery Box, as a result they earned money for the pot and Gijs re-entered the game.)	Execution; Cancelled	4th	5th	Executed 6th			
Jim	Non; Execution		Execution; Cancelled	1st	1st	Executed 2nd			
Victoria	Non; Execution		Execution; Cancelled	5th (Note: Due to an assignment, Victoria's test would be deducted of one answer in this episode.)	Executed				
Yvonne	Non; Execution		Execution; Cancelled	Executed					
Roeland	Non; Execution		Withdrew						
Percentage	34%	39%		39%	40%	38%	50% (Note: Out of curiosity, Angela revealed the group's percentage for the test despite the twist finishing at the previous Execution. The final 5 candidates scored 50% on this test.)		

The candidate is the winner of Wie is de Mol 2005.
The candidate was unmasked as The Mole 2005.
The candidate was the losing finalist of Wie is de Mol 2005.
The candidate saw a Green Screen to proceeded to the next Episode.
The candidate won an Exemption to automatically proceed to the next Episode.
The candidate successfully assisted the Mole during an assignment in this episode for automatic correct answers for the test, and saw a Green Screen to proceed to the next Episode.
The candidate did not see a Green Screen before the Executed player saw their Red Screen. Thus they proceeded to the next Episode.
The candidate was executed from the game and sent home.
The candidate was withdrawn from the game for medical reasons, and returned home.

== Episodes ==
For more information, see: List of seasons of "Wie is de Mol?"

Episode	Air Date	Amount in Pot (Note: Pot earnings: indicates an increase indicates no change indicates a decrease)	Location	Days	Eliminated	References
1	January 14, 2005	€0 → €1,000	Lisse, Netherlands → Kangaroo Island, Australia	1	—N/a (Note: No one was eliminated, due to the introduction of the season's first twist.)	
2	January 21, 2005	€1,000 → €11,750	Kangaroo Island, Australia	2—3	Gijs (Note: In Episode 3, the candidates unknowingly had an opportunity to bring Gijs back into the game, and they succeeded.)	
3	January 28, 2005	€11,750 → €18,250	Kangaroo Island, Australia → Adelaide, Australia	4—5	Roeland (Note: Roeland was advised to withdraw from the game due to medical reasons, cancelling this episode's Execution.)	
4	February 4, 2005	€18,250 → €13,750	Adelaide, Australia	6	Yvonne	
5	February 11, 2005	€13,750 → €16,250	Adelaide, Australia	7—8	Victoria	
6	February 18, 2005	€16,250 → €17,000	Adelaide, Australia → Darwin, Australia	9—10	Jim (Note: The candidates failed the season's Percentage twist, and as a repercussion, two candidates were executed from the game.)	
6	February 18, 2005	€16,250 → €17,000	Adelaide, Australia → Darwin, Australia	9—10	Gijs	
7	February 25, 2005	€17,000 → €15,000	Darwin, Australia → Kuta, Bali, Indonesia → Ubud, Bali, Indonesia	10—12	Sander	
8	March 4, 2005	€15,000 → €19,000	Ubud, Bali, Indonesia → Jimbaran, Bali, Indonesia	13—15	Isabelle	
9	March 11, 2005	€19,000 → €23,000	Jimbaran, Bali, Indonesia → Kuta, Bali, Indonesia	15—16	—N/a (Note: No one got eliminated because the remaining contestants were the finalists of the season.)	
10	March 18, 2005	€23,000	Lisse, Netherlands	Losing Finalist	Lottie	
10	March 18, 2005	€23,000	Lisse, Netherlands	Winner	Marc-Marie	
10	March 18, 2005	€23,000	Lisse, Netherlands	The Mole	Yvon	

== Reception ==
=== Viewing Figures ===
For more information, see: List of seasons of "Wie is de Mol?"

Viewing Figures
#	Air Date	Time Slot	Viewers
1	January 14, 2005	Friday; 20.30 CET	1,289,000
2	January 21, 2005	Friday; 20.30 CET	1,333,000
3	January 28, 2005	Friday; 20.30 CET	1,370,000
4	February 4, 2005	Friday; 20.30 CET	1,308,000
5	February 11, 2005	Friday; 20.30 CET	1,439,000
6	February 18, 2005	Friday; 20.30 CET	1,548,000
7	February 25, 2005	Friday; 20.30 CET	1,409,000
8	March 4, 2005	Friday; 20.30 CET	1,573,000
9	March 11, 2005	Friday; 20.30 CET	1,745,000
10	March 18, 2005	Friday; 20.30 CET	1,485,000

These Viewer ratings included Delayed Viewing.
