= Wie is de Mol? (Dutch TV series) =

Dutch reality television show

- Genre: Reality competition
- Based on: De Mol by: Michiel Devlieger; Bart de Pauw; Tom Lenaerts; Michel Vanhove
- Directed by: Kristof de Wit; Rick McCullough
- Presented by: Rik van de Westelaken; Hila Noorzai; Art Rooijakkers; Pieter Jan Hagens; Karel van de Graaf; Angela Groothuizen; Sipke Jan Bousema
- Opening theme: "Oratio" by Ugo Farrell
- Country of origin: Netherlands
- Original language: Dutch
- No. of seasons: 26 (regular)

Production
- Production locations: List: Australia; Scotland; Portugal; Canada; Indonesia (Bali); Argentina; Thailand; Mexico; Northern Ireland & Jordan; Japan; El Salvador & Nicaragua; Iceland & Spain (Andalusia); South Africa; Hong Kong & Philippines; Sri Lanka; Dominican Republic; United States (Oregon); Georgia, Armenia, Azerbaijan, Kazakhstan, Russia & Ukraine; Colombia; China (Henan); Italy (Tuscany); Czech Republic; Albania; Oman; Cambodia; Tanzania; Croatia
- Editors: Nic Vegter; Rick Sørensen; René van Berge Henegouwen; Ricardo Maat
- Running time: 50-75 minutes
- Production companies: IDTV; AVROTROS (2015−present); AVRO (1999−2014)

Original release
- Network: NPO 1 (AVROTROS, 2015−present); NPO 1 (AVRO, 1999−2003, 2007−2014); NPO 2 (AVRO, 2005−2006); NPO Start (AVROTROS, streaming editions, 2024−present)
- Release: November 19, 1999 – present

Related
- De Mol; MolTalk; Mollenstreken

Wie is de Mol? (English: Who is the Mole?) is a Dutch adventure reality competition show. It is based on the Belgian show De Mol, the original version of the format created in 1998 by Woestijnvis and broadcast on VRT. It is one of the most popular television shows in the Netherlands.

== Format ==
Wie is de Mol? is a reality television competition involving a group of candidates. These candidates travel to a foreign country where they have to complete assignments to earn money to fill the prize pot. However, one of the participants is selected as the Mole. The Mole's goal is to secretly sabotage the assignments and keep the total amount of money in the pot as low as possible. The other candidates do not know who the Mole is, and attempt to figure out the Mole's identity throughout the season.

At the end of every episode the candidates take a multiple choice test about the Mole's identity. The test contains 20 questions (40 questions in the final test) about the Mole's activities since the previous test and personal questions about the Mole (for example, "On which team was the mole during the castle-assignment" or "Has the mole been baptized?").

Throughout a season, multiple advantages can be earned:

- A joker corrects an incorrect answered question on the test.
- A green exemption makes a contestant unable to be eliminated.
- A black exemption makes all other played advantages undone.

In most cases, a contestant can choose whether or not and when to play their earned advantage(s).

The person with the fewest correct answers is then eliminated from the show. In most series this process continues until only two contestants and the Mole remain. The winner is the person with the most correct answers in the final test and they get all of the money earned for the prize pot throughout the season.

It often occurs that an unexpected assignment is presented after all contestant filled out a test, which can result in no one being eliminated in that episode, regardless of the results.

== Hosts ==
Color key:

Host
Guest appearance
Participant

Host	S1	S2	S3	S4	S5	S6	S7	S8	S9	S10	S11	S12	S13	S14	S15	S16	S17	S18	S19	S20	JB1 (Note: A special 20th anniversary season of Wie is de Mol?)	S21	S22	S23	S24	STR1 (Note: A special streaming season in celebration of 25 years of Wie is de Mol? with its first all civilian cast since season 4.)	S25	JB2 (Note: A special 25th anniversary season of Wie is de Mol?)	S26	STR2 (Note: A second streaming season commissioned after the success of the first streaming season.)
Angela Groothuizen																														
Karel van de Graaf																														
Pieter Jan Hagens																														
Art Rooijakkers																														
Rik van de Westelaken																														
Hila Noorzai																														

== Seasons ==
=== Regular seasons ===
The first four seasons of Wie is de Mol? had non-celebrities as participants. After a one-year hiatus in 2004, all participants in the following seasons were Dutch celebrities.

The 7th season in 2007 was the first season to have four finalists, with two runner-ups. This also occurred in the 20th season.

The 12th season was the first to have an all-female finale. This also occurred in the 21st season. An all-male finale has not occurred so far.

The 18th season in 2018 was the first to be located in six countries: Armenia, Azerbaijan, Kazakhstan, Russia, Ukraine (episode 1) and Georgia (episode 1–10).

Broadcasting of the 26th season was delayed to make room on NPO 1 for broadcasting the 2026 Winter Olympics.

Season	Start date	Finale (reunion)	Host	The Mole	Winner	Runner-up(s)	Amount won	International destination	Other contestants
1	19 November 1999	21 January 2000	Angela Groothuizen	Deborah	Petra	Robin	ƒ82,500 (Note: Guilder, the national Dutch currency at the time)	Australia	List: Wilmie; Arnoud; Foke; Warner; John; Willy; Sandy
2	5 January 2001	2 March 2001	Angela Groothuizen	Nico	Sigrid	Yvonne	ƒ70,000	Scotland	List: Doortje; Dan; Cor; Nafize; Björn; Ward; Gerda
3	8 February 2002	19 April 2002	Angela Groothuizen	George	John	Jantien	€42,300.-	Portugal	List: Ellen; Harry; Prince; Karen; Kerstin; Dick; Paméla; Erik
4	15 March 2003	24 May 2003	Angela Groothuizen	Elise	Ron	Chandrika	€35,550.-	Canada	List: René; Ferdi; Patricia; Astrid Elburg; Aafke; Julien; Louis
5	14 January 2005	18 March 2005	Angela Groothuizen	Yvon Jaspers	Marc-Marie Huijbregts	Lottie Hellingman	€23,000.-	Australia; Indonesia (Bali)	List: Isabelle Brinkman; Sander de Heer; Gijs Staverman; Jim de Groot; Victoria Koblenko; Yvonne van den Hurk; Roeland Fernhout
6	10 March 2006	12 May 2006	Karel van de Graaf	Milouska Meulens	Frédérique Huydts (Note: Frédérique Huydts died on 3 April 2006, during the period that season 6 was broadcast on television. As requested by her, the airing of the season continued. The €24,475.- that she won was donated to WWF and Foundation KiKa.)	Roderick Veelo	€24,475.-	Argentina	List: Peggy Vrijens; Toine van Peperstraten; Richard Groenendijk; Liz Snoijink; Mary-Lou van Stenis; Chris Tates; Geert Hoes
7	4 January 2007	15 March 2007	Karel van de Graaf	Inge Ipenburg	Paul Rabbering	Renate Verbaan; Eva van der Gucht	€17,300.-	Thailand	List: Nadja Hüpscher; Dick Jol; Alex Klaasen; Menno Bentveld; Liesbeth Kamerling; Sander Lantinga
8	3 January 2008	6 March 2008	Pieter Jan Hagens	Dennis Weening	Edo Brunner	Regina Romeijn	€20,375.-	Mexico	List: Patrick Martens; Dunya Khayame; Joris Linssen; Coen Swijnenberg; Georgina Verbaan; Annette van Trigt; Nicolette Kluijver
9	8 January 2009	12 March 2009	Pieter Jan Hagens	Jon van Eerd	Vivienne van den Assem	Anniek Pheifer	€22,650.-	Northern Ireland; Jordan	List: Dennis Storm; Rick Engelkes; Sebastiaan Labrie; Froukje Jansen; Paula Udondek; Hans Schiffers; Vera Mann
10	7 January 2010	25 March 2010	Pieter Jan Hagens	Kim Pieters	Frits Sissing	Sanne Vogel	€21,950.-	Japan	List: Erik van der Hoff; Arjen Lubach; Hind Laroussi; Barbara Barend; Manuel Venderbos; Tim Akkerman; Loretta Schrijver
11	6 January 2011	17 March 2011	Pieter Jan Hagens	Patrick Stoof	Art Rooijakkers (Note: After unmasking the Mole in season 11 and winning the season, Art went on to present Wie is de Mol? from seasons 12 to 18.)	Soundos el Ahmadi	€19,540.-	El Salvador; Nicaragua	List: Karin de Groot; Anna Drijver; Pepijn Gunneweg; Jan Kooijman; Miryanna van Reeden; Horace Cohen; Hanna Bervoets
12	5 January 2012	8 March 2012	Art Rooijakkers	Anne-Marie Jung	Hadewych Minis	Liesbeth Staats	€12,601.-	Iceland; Spain (Andalusia)	List: Tim Kamps; William Spaaij; Frits Huffnagel; Marit van Bohemen; Maarten van der Weijden; Dio Braaf; Marion Pauw
13	3 January 2013	7 March 2013	Art Rooijakkers	Kees Tol	Paulien Cornelisse	Carolien Borgers	€17,120.-	South Africa	List: Zarayda Groenhart; Daniël Boissevain; Tania Kross; Tim Haars; Janine Abbring; Joep van Deudekom; Ewout Genemans
14	2 January 2014	20 March 2014	Art Rooijakkers	Susan Visser	Sofie van den Enk	Freek Bartels	€16,700.-	Hong Kong; Philippines	List: Tygo Gernandt; Jan-Willem Roodbeen; Aaf Brandt Corstius; Jennifer Hoffman; Daphne Bunskoek; Owen Schumacher; Maurice Lede
15	1 January 2015	5 March 2015	Art Rooijakkers	Margriet van der Linden	Rik van de Westelaken (Note: After unmasking the Mole in season 15 and winning the season, Rik went on to present Wie is de Mol? from season 19 onwards.)	Marlijn Weerdenburg	€10,500.-	Sri Lanka	List: Chris Zegers; Martine Sandifort; Carolina Dijkhuizen; Viktor Brand; Ajouad El Miloudi; Evelien Bosch; Pieter Derks
16	2 January 2016	5 March 2016	Art Rooijakkers	Klaas van Kruistum	Tim Hofman	Annemieke Schollaardt	€13,020.-	Dominican Republic	List: Taeke Taekema; Rop Verheijen; Cécile Narinx; Marjolein Keuning; Ellie Lust; Remy van Kesteren; Airen Mylene
17	7 January 2017	11 March 2017	Art Rooijakkers	Thomas Cammaert	Sanne Wallis De Vries	Jochem van Gelder	€24,320.-	United States (Oregon)	List: Diederik Jekel; Imanuelle Grives; Jeroen Kijk in de Vegte; Sigrid ten Napel; Roos Schlikker; Yvonne Coldeweijer; Vincent Vianen
18	6 January 2018	10 March 2018	Art Rooijakkers	Jan Versteegh	Ruben Hein	Olcay Gulsen	€17,750.-	Georgia (Note: Candidates began the first episode in five duos, spread across the capitals of Armenia, Azerbaijan, Kazakhstan, Russia and Ukraine. The first assignment involved finding plane tickets to Georgia, where the remainder of the season took place.)	List: Simone Weimans; Stine Jensen; Loes Haverkort; Emilio Guzman; Bella Hay; Jean-Marc van Tol; Ron Boszhard
19	5 January 2019	9 March 2019	Rik van de Westelaken	Merel Westrik	Sarah Chronis	Niels Littooij	€10,150.-	Colombia	List: Sinan Can; Rick Paul van Mulligen; Jamie Trenité; Robèrt van Beckhoven; Evelien de Bruijn; Nikkie de Jager; Evi Hanssen
20	11 January 2020	14 March 2020	Rik van de Westelaken	Rob Dekay	Buddy Vedder	Miljuschka Witzenhausen; Nathan Rutjes	€13,400.-	China (Henan)	List: Leonie ter Braak; Claes Iversen; Johan Goossens; Jaike Belfor; Tina de Bruin; Anita Witzier
21	2 January 2021	6 March 2021	Rik van de Westelaken	Renée Fokker	Rocky Hehakaija	Charlotte Nijs	€9,675.-	Czech Republic	List: Splinter Chabot; Marije Knevel; Joshua Nolet; Lakshmi Swami Persaud; Florentijn Hofman; Erik de Zwart; Remco Veldhuis
22	1 January 2022	5 March 2022	Rik van de Westelaken	Everon Jackson Hooi	Fresia Cousiño Arias	Kim-Lian van der Meij	€8,065.-	Albania	List: Thomas van Luyn; Laetitia Gerards; Sahil Amar Aïssa; Hila Noorzai; Arno Kantelberg; Welmoed Sijtsma; Glen Faria; Suzanne Klemann
23	7 January 2023	11 March 2023	Rik van de Westelaken	Jurre Geluk	Daniël Verlaan	Ranomi Kromowidjojo	€11,650.-	South Africa (Western Cape)	List: Soy Kroon; Anke de Jong; Nabil Aoulad Ayad; Annick Boer; Sander de Kramer; Froukje de Both; Sarah Janneh
24	6 January 2024	9 March 2024	Rik van de Westelaken	Anna Gimbrère	Fons Hendriks	Rosario Mussendijk	€8,585.-	Mexico	List: Kees van der Spek; Rian Gerritsen; Babs Schutte; Tooske Ragas; Jeroen Spitzenberger; Justin Mooijer; Jip van den Toorn
25	4 January 2025	8 March 2025	Rik van de Westelaken	Stijn de Vries	Roos Moggré	Maaike Martens	€8,055.-	Cambodia	List: Sophie Frankenmolen; Nora Akachar; Sam Hagens; Bridget Maasland; Ray Klaassens; Gabriël Martina; Teun Luijkx
26	28 February 2026	2 May 2026	Rik van de Westelaken	Daan Boom	Bram Krikke	Quinty Misiedjan	€13,280.-	Tanzania	List: Matteo van der Grijn; Milan van Dongen; Eveline Stallaart; Nienke van Dijk; Delilah Warcup-van Eyck; Nasrdin Dchar; Geraldine Kemper
27	TBA		Rik van de Westelaken	TBA					

=== Anniversary seasons ===
At the reunion of the 20th season (on 14 March 2020), a 20th anniversary season was announced to air in September 2020. The season featured 10 previous contestants. Former Moles Milouska Muelens, Inge Ipenburg, Dennis Weening, Jon van Eerd, Kim Pieters, Patrick Stoof, Kees Tol, Klaas van Kruistum, Thomas Cammaert and Merel Westrik made guest appearances.

In February 2025, a 25th anniversary season was announced to air in November 2025. The season featured 5 previous contestants and 5 previous Moles. Former winners Marc-Marie Huijbregts, Paul Rabbering, Edo Brunner, Hadwych Minis, Sofie van den Enk, Tim Hofman, Sanne Wallis de Vries, Sarah Chronis, Rocky Hehakaija, former contestant Ellie Lust and former hosts Pieter Jan Hagens and Art Rooijakkers made guest appearances.

Season	Start date	Finale (reunion)	Host	The Mole	Winner	Runner-up	Amount won	International destination	Other contestants
JB1	5 September 2020	24 October 2020	Rik van de Westelaken	Jeroen Kijk in de Vegte (contestant in season 17)	Nikkie de Jager (contestant in season 19)	Tygo Gernandt (contestant in season 14)	€12,580.-	Italy (Tuscany)	List: Peggy Vrijens (contestant in season 6); Ron Boszhard (contestant in season 18); Patrick Martens (contestant in season 8); Ellie Lust (contestant in season 16); Horace Cohen (contestant in season 11); Nadja Hüpscher (contestant in season 7); Tina de Bruin (contestant in season 20)
JB2	1 November 2025	20 December 2025	Rik van de Westelaken	Nathan Rutjes (runner-up in season 20)	Merel Westrik (Mole of season 19)	Loes Haverkort (contestant in season 18)	€5,340.-	Portugal	List: Kim Pieters (Mole of season 10); Anne-Marie Jung (Mole of season 12); Jurre Geluk (Mole of season 23); Sahil Amar Aïssa (contestant in season 22); Dennis Weening (Mole of season 8); Richard Groenendijk (contestant in season 6); Imanuelle Grives (contestant in season 17)

=== NPO Start editions ===
On 14 May 2024, a special season was announced to air exclusively on NPO Start and NLZIET in June 2024. This was the first season to feature non-celebrity candidates since 2003. It is hosted by Hila Noorzai, who was a contestant in season 22 in 2022.

On 14 October 2024, a second streaming season was announced to air in 2026. Noorzai returned as host.

Season	Start date	Finale (reunion)	Host	The Mole	Winner	Runner-up	Amount won	International destination
STR1	28 June 2024	19 July 2024	Hila Noorzai	Nyree	Emma	Jelmer	€10,535.-	Oman
STR2	9 October 2026	TBA	Hila Noorzai	TBA				Croatia

=== Junior editions ===
Season	Airdate	Host	The Mole	Winner	Runner-up	Prize money	Destination
1	17 May 2008	Sipke Jan Bousema	Amin	Naomi	Lara	6970 Two and a half cent coin (€79)	Zwolle
2	9 March 2014	Art Rooijakkers	Jenny	Davey	Roeland	€1,020	Maastricht; Zeeland

== Ratings ==
Season	Timeslot	Premiere		Finale (Reunion)		Average ratings
Season	Timeslot	Date	Ratings	Date	Ratings	Average ratings
1	Friday, 20:30	19 November 1999	807,000	21 January 2000	915,000	793,000
2	Friday, 20:30	5 January 2001	1,070,000	2 March 2001	960,000	1,006,000
3	Friday, 21:35	8 February 2002	928,000	19 April 2002	1,005,000	909,000
4	Saturday, 21:00	15 March 2003	1,115,000	24 May 2003	626,000	785,000
5	Friday, 20:30	14 January 2005	1,289,000	18 March 2005	1,485,000	1,450,000
6	Friday, 20:30	10 March 2006	1,168,000	12 May 2006	1,147,000	1,106,000
7	Thursday, 20:30 (Note: Except for episode 5 of season 15, due to an incident at Media Park Hilversum. The episode aired the following Friday at 20:30)	4 January 2007	1,358,000	15 March 2007	1,270,000	1,188,000
8	Thursday, 20:30	3 January 2008	1,922,000	6 March 2008	1,563,000	1,513,000
9	Thursday, 20:30	8 January 2009	1,597,000	12 March 2009	1,409,000	1,460,000
10	Thursday, 20:30	7 January 2010	2,040,000	25 March 2010	1,558,000	1,673,000
11	Thursday, 20:30	6 January 2011	2,146,000	17 March 2011	2,031,000	1,922,000
12	Thursday, 20:30	5 January 2012	2,136,000	8 March 2012	2,105,000	1,899,000
13	Thursday, 20:30	3 January 2013	2,070,000	7 March 2013	2,579,000	2,132,000
14	Thursday, 20:30	2 January 2014	2,455,000	20 March 2014	3,148,000	2,464,000
15	Thursday, 20:30	1 January 2015	2,486,000	5 March 2015	3,359,000	2,403,700
16	Saturday, 20:30	2 January 2016	2,163,000	5 March 2016	2,982,000	2,114,900
17	Saturday, 20:30	7 January 2017	2,882,000	11 March 2017	2,999,000	2,536,000
18	Saturday, 20:30	6 January 2018	2,669,000	10 March 2018	3,227,000	2,582,300
19	Saturday, 20:30	5 January 2019	2,986,000	9 March 2019	3,500,000	2,869,400
20	Saturday, 20:30	11 January 2020	3,002,000	14 March 2020	3,894,000	2,591,300
JB1	Saturday, 20:30	5 September 2020	2,665,000	24 October 2020	3,567,000	2,741,750
21	Saturday, 20:30	2 January 2021	3,117,000	6 March 2021	3,348,000	3,180,700
22	Saturday, 20:30	1 January 2022	3,120,000	5 March 2022	3,242,000	2,894,000
23	Saturday, 20:30	7 January 2023	2,634,000	11 March 2023	3,081,000	2,451,400
24	Saturday, 20:30	6 January 2024	3,717,000	9 March 2024	3,074,000	
25	Saturday, 20:30	4 January 2025	3,476,000	8 March 2025	2,827,000	

== Live reunion ==
Ever since 2015, the reunion (the final episode, where the Mole and their sabotaging activity is revealed) is broadcast live, with an audience. Over the years, multiple locations have hosted the live reunion.

- 2015−2020 and 2024: VondelCS (located in Vondelpark) in Amsterdam
  - The 2020 reunion was still broadcast live but was held without an audience due to the COVID-19 pandemic.
- The 20th anniversary season reunion (later in 2020) was held in the Vondel Church (located in Vondelpark) in Amsterdam. Due to the COVID-19 pandemic, it was not broadcast live and it was held without an audience.
- 2021: Gashouder building of Westergasfabriek in Amsterdam. This reunion was broadcast live but held with an online audience.
- 2022: Rode Hoed in Amsterdam. This was the first reunion to feature a live audience since the COVID-19 pandemic.
- 2023: Soestdijk Palace in Baarn.
- The reunion of the NPO Start edition in 2024 was not broadcast live. It was held at an undisclosed location, without an audience.
- 2025−2026: De Hallen Studios in Amsterdam. Only AVROTROS members were able to attend.
