= Wie is de Mol? (Dutch TV series) season 24 =

Dutch reality television season

Wie is de Mol?
- Season 24
- Presented by: Rik van de Westelaken
- No. of contestants: 10
- Winner: Fons Hendriks
- Runner-up: Rosario Mussendijk
- Location: Mexico
- The Mole: Anna Gimbrère
- No. of episodes: 10

Release
- Original network: AVROTROS (NPO 1)
- Original release: January 6 – March 9, 2024

Season chronology
- ← Previous; Season 23: South Africa Next → Season 25: Cambodia

The twenty-fourth season of the Dutch TV series Wie is de Mol? ("Who is the Mole?") began on 6 January 2024. This was the seventh season with Rik van de Westelaken as host. The season was filmed in Mexico. The 8th season was also filmed in Mexico, making the 2024 season the third time the show revisits a country. (Note: The candidates visited Australia during the 1999 and 2005 seasons, and South Africa during the 2013 and 2023 seasons.)

== Format ==
The season followed the same format as its Belgian predecessor. In total, ten candidates were gathered to complete assignments to earn money for the group pot. However, one of the ten is the titular Mole (de Mol), the one designated to sabotage the assignments and cause the group to earn the least amount of money for the winner's pot as possible. Every few days, players would take a 20-question multiple choice test about the identity of the Mole. Once the test is complete, the candidates await their results in an Execution ceremony. The candidate with the worst score is "executed" (eliminated) from the game, while in the event of a tie the candidate who completed their test the slowest is executed. The season plays out until there are three remaining candidates, where they must complete a final test (consisting of 40 questions). The candidate with the highest score, or who had completed their test the fastest in a tie, is declared the winner and receives the money in the group's pot.

== Candidates ==
The ten candidates were announced on 21 November 2023.

Name	Occupation	Day Exited	Result
Anna Gimbrère	Science Journalist	18	The Mole
Fons Hendriks	Presenter	18	Winner
Rosario Mussendijk	Musician	18	2nd Place
Kees van der Spek	Crime Journalist	18	3rd Place
Rian Gerritsen	Actress	16	4th Place
Babs Schutte	Musician	14	5th Place (Note: Babs was originally executed from the game in 9th place, but won her way back into the game on day 8.)
Tooske Ragas	Actress and Presenter	12	6th Place
Jeroen Spitzenberger	Actor	10	7th Place
Justin Mooijer	Drag Queen	6	8th Place
Jip van den Toorn	Cartoonist	5	9th Place

Notes

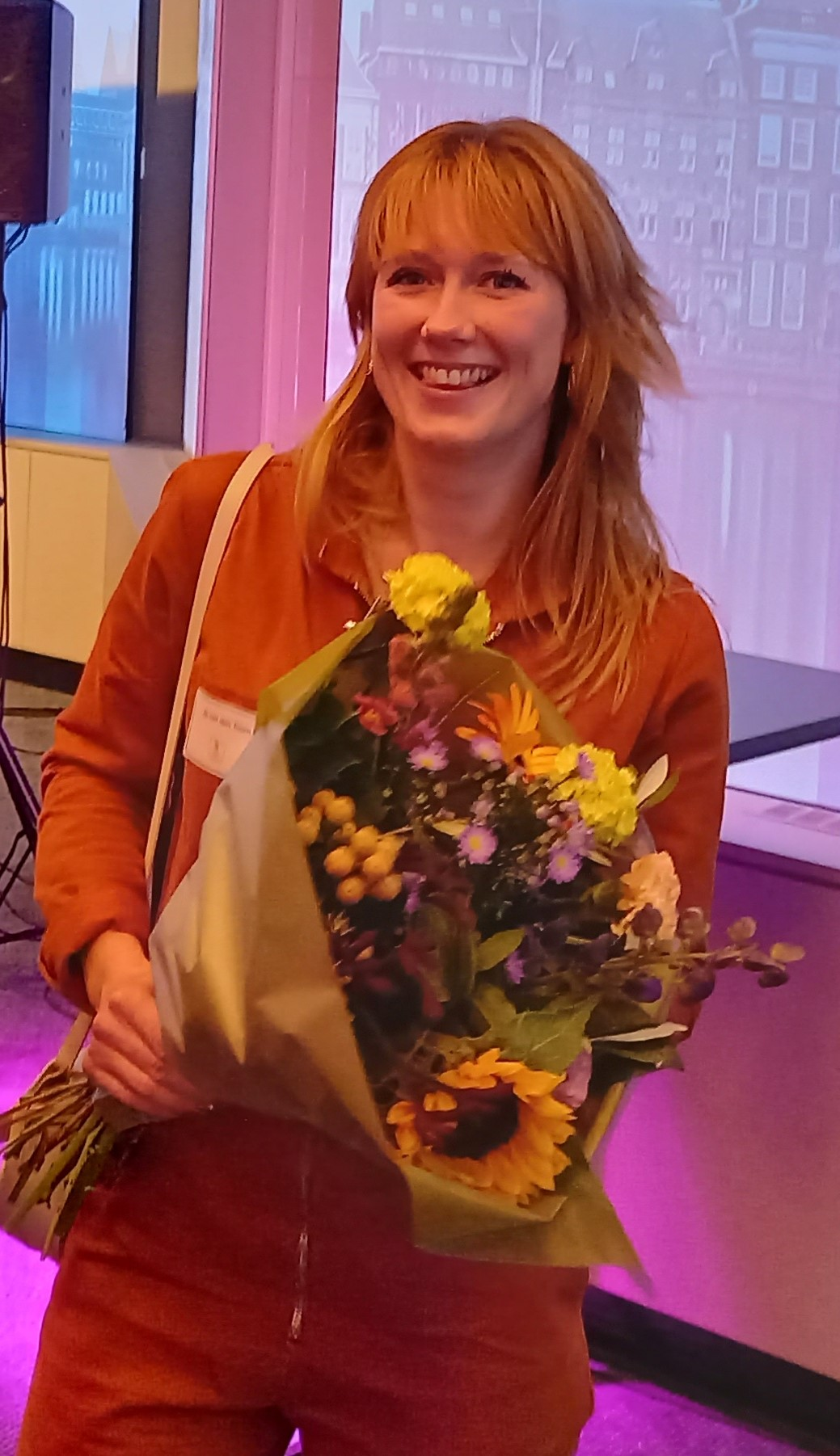
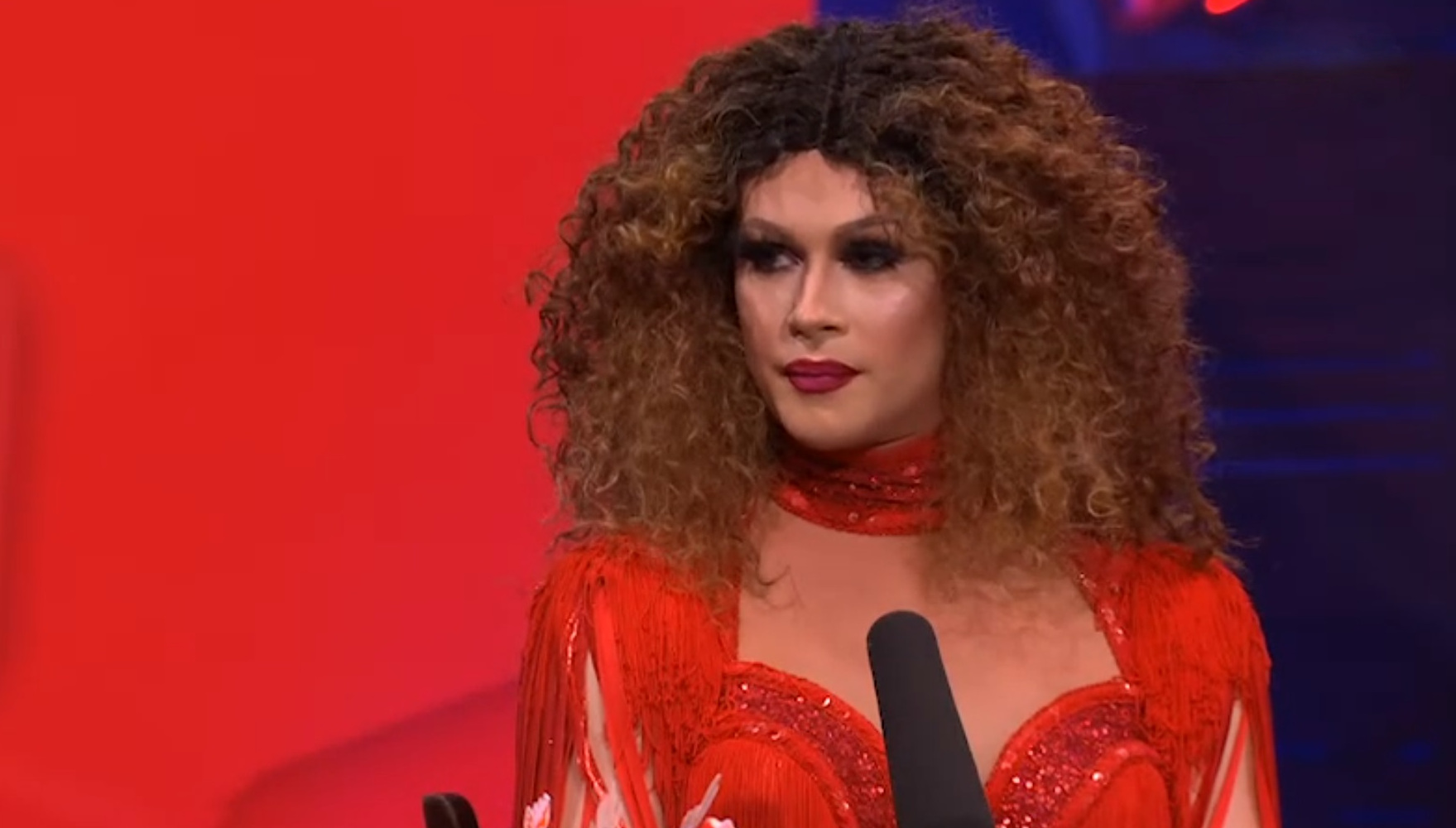
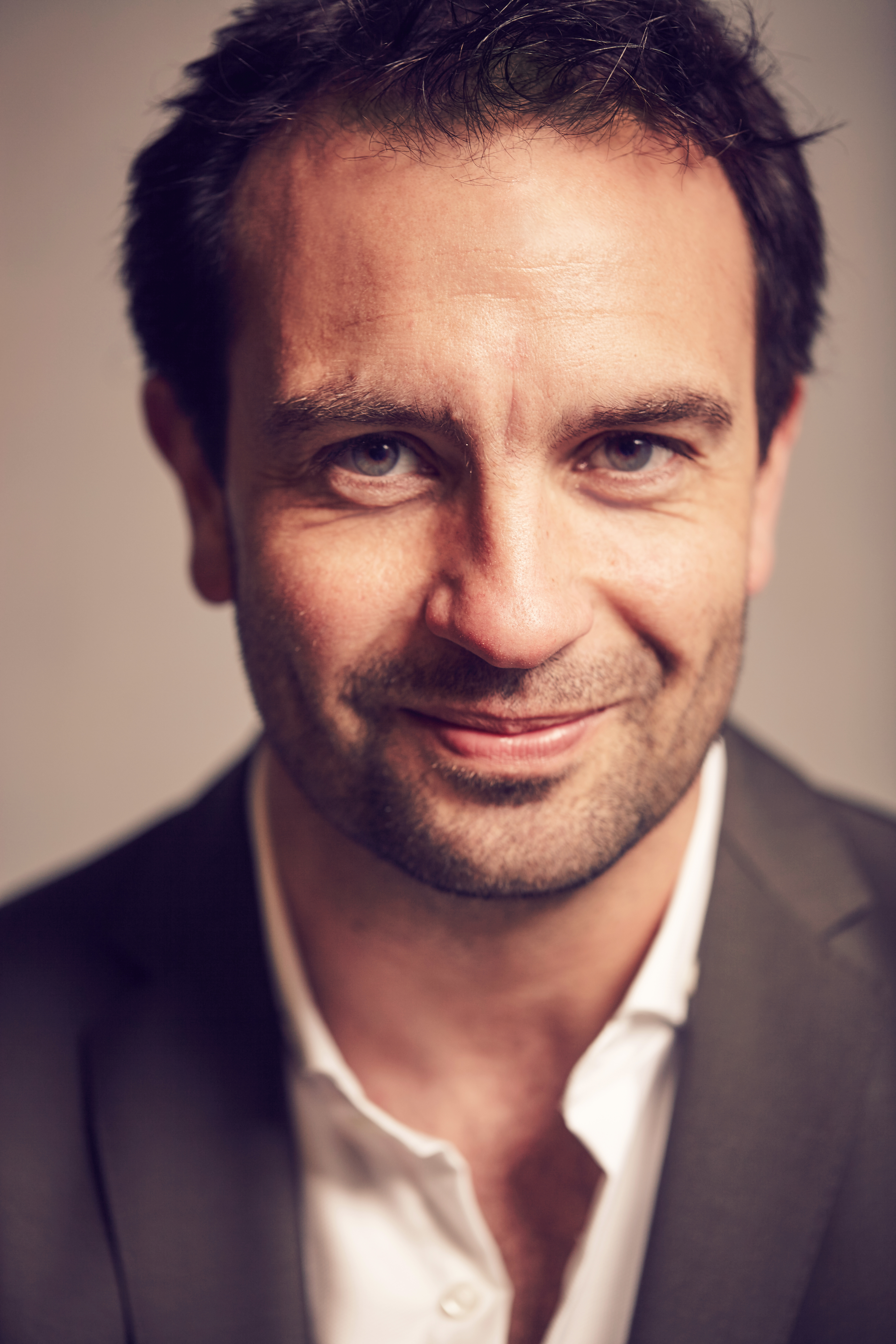
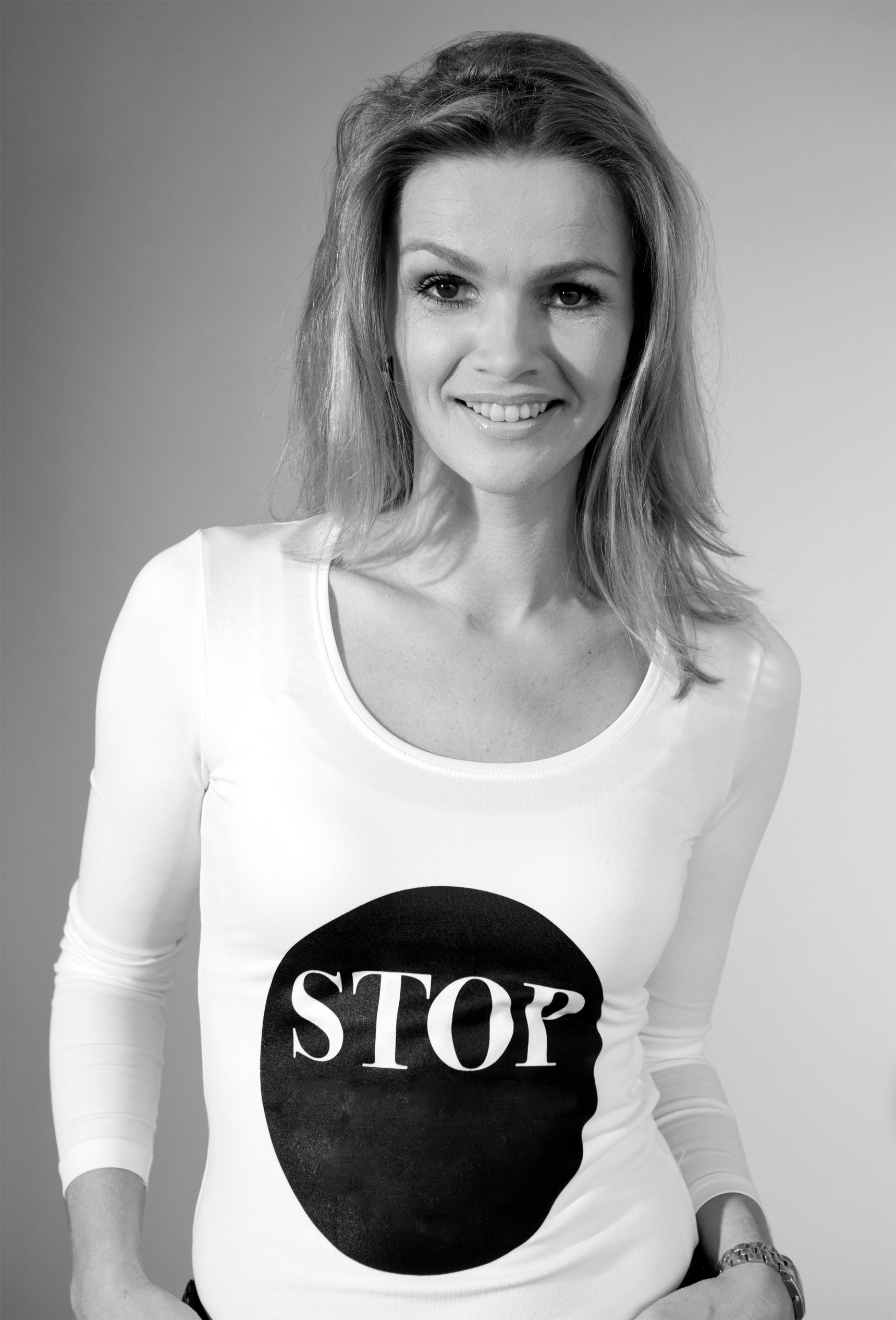
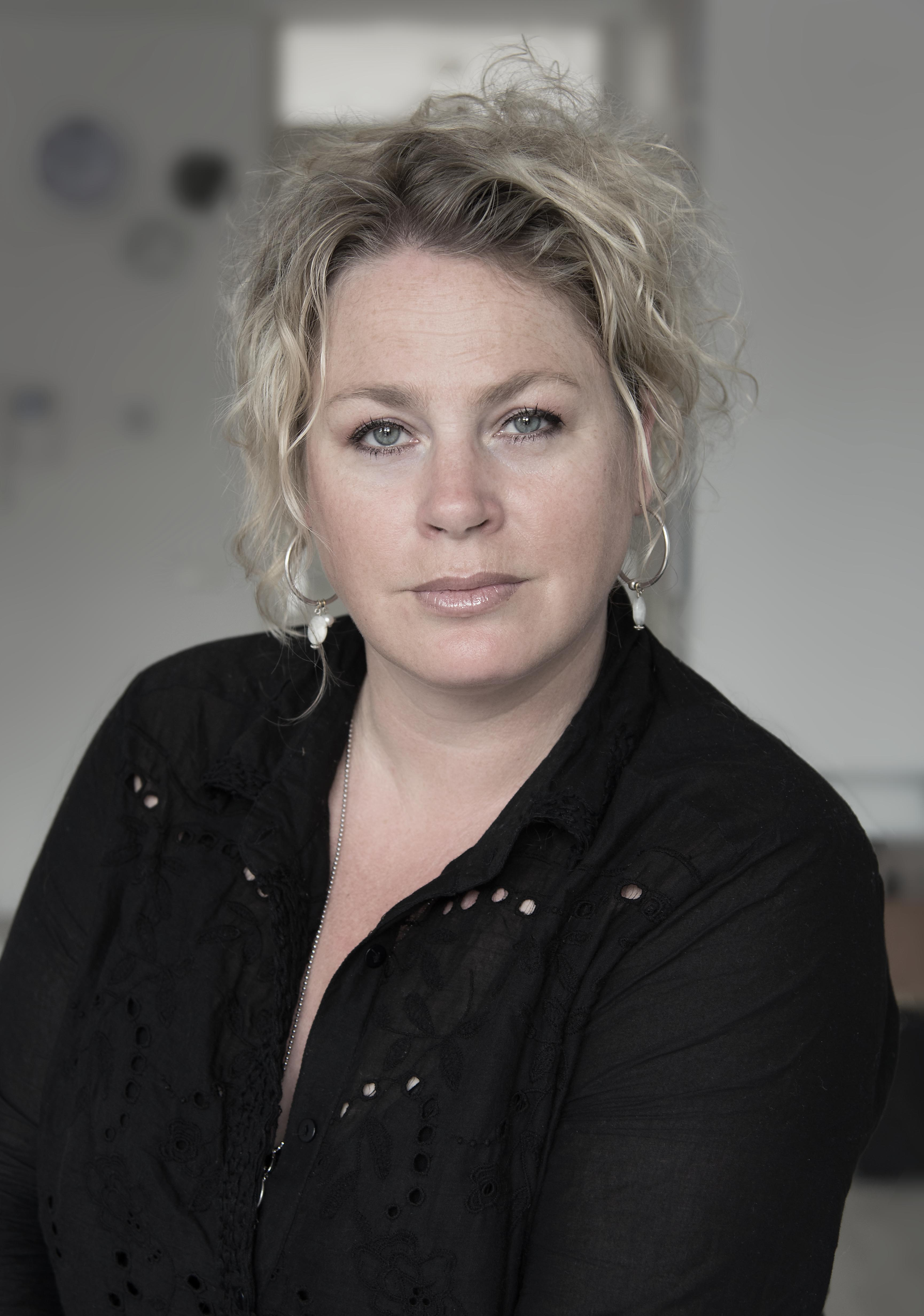
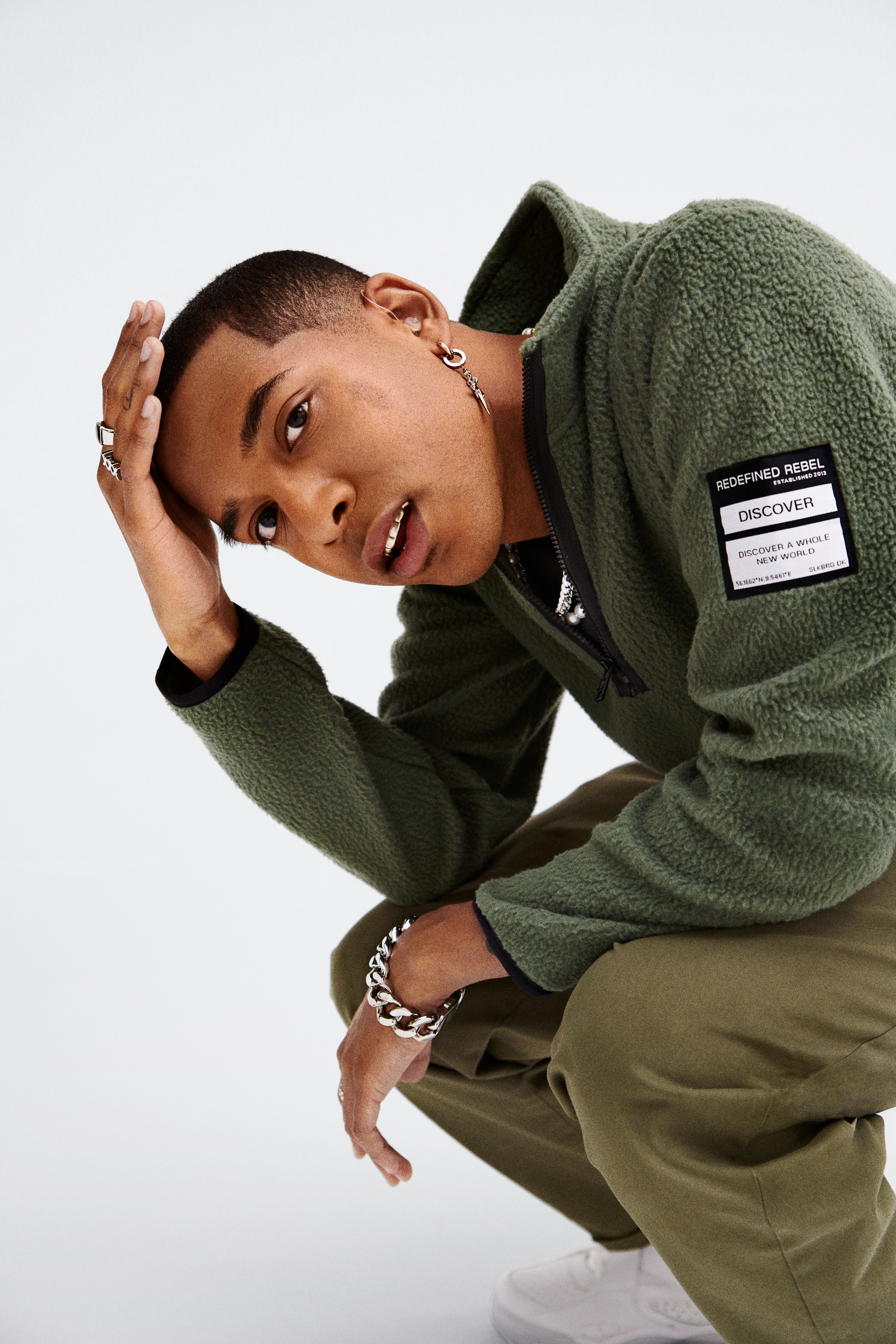
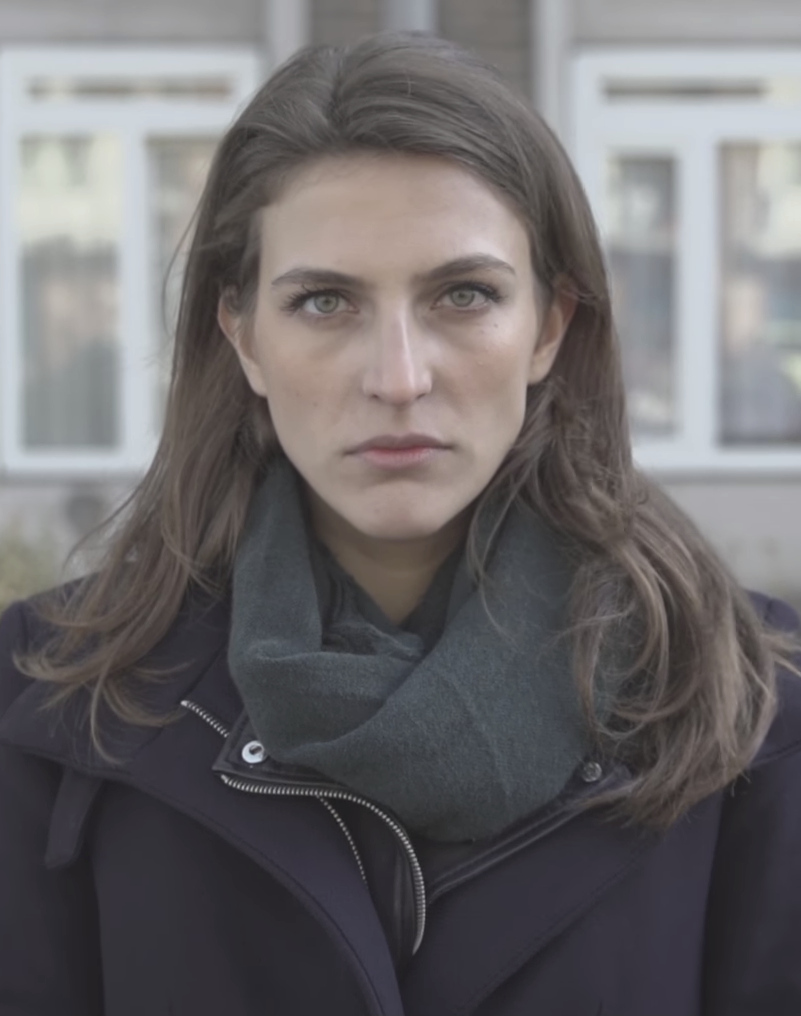
From left to right: Jip van den Toorn, Justin Mooijer, Jeroen Spitzenberger, Tooske Ragas, Rian Gerritsen, Rosario Mussendijk and Anna Gimbrère

== Candidate progress ==
The order in which the candidates learned their results are indicated in the table below.

Summary of candidates progress in each episode
Candidate	1	2	3	5	6	7	8	9 (Note: The final four candidates took the final test in episode 9. Kees scored the lowest and was eliminated before the finale.)	Finale
Fons				(1)	3rd	3rd (1)			Winner
Anna		2nd		3rd		1st		2nd	The Mole
Rosario		3rd		2nd (1)		4th	(1)	1st	Runner-Up
Kees	3rd			(1)	1st	exempt		Executed	
Rian	4th				2nd	2nd	Executed		
Babs	Executed			1st		Executed			
Tooske		1st		(3)	Executed (1)				
Jeroen		4th		Executed					
Justin	1st		Executed						
Jip	2nd	Executed							

Key
The candidate saw a Green Screen and proceeded to the next episode.
The candidate did not see a Green Screen before the Executed player saw their Red Screen. Thus they proceeded to the next episode.
The candidate received an Exemption to automatically proceed to the next episode.
The candidate was executed from the game and sent home.

For candidates who used Jokers on a quiz, the amount are presented in parentheses.

== Episodes ==
For more information, see: List of seasons of "Wie is de Mol?" (in Dutch)

Episode	Air Date	Title	Amount in Pot (Note: Pot earnings: indicates an increase indicates no change indicates a decrease)	Location	Days	Eliminated
1	6 January 2024	'Een Handje Helpen' (A Helping Hand)	€0 → €6,500	Mexico City, Mexico	1–3	Babs
2	13 January 2024	'Afgelopen?' (Over/Finished?)	€6,500 → €7,500 (Note: Candidates earned €7,750 for the pot during the first two episodes' assignments. However, a pot count at the end of episode 2 found that €250 was missing, therefore reducing the pot to €7,500 at the time. Following treasurer Justin's elimination at the end of episode 3, he revealed that he hid the missing money in his belongings and returned it to the pot.)	Mexico City, Mexico & Mineral del Chico, Hidalgo	3–5	Jip
3	20 January 2024	'Vragenvuur' (Burning Questions)	€7,500 → €8,825	Mexico City, Mexico	5–6	Justin
4	27 January 2024	'Revanche' (Rematch)	€8,825 → €9,025	Mexico City, Mexico, Celestún & Mérida, Yucatán	7–8	—N/a
5	3 February 2024	'Terugkeer' (Return)	€9,025 → €4,025	Mérida & Yaxcabá, Yucatán	8–10	Jeroen
6	10 February 2024	'Afvragen' (Questioning)	€4,025 → €7,525	Mérida & Ticul, Yucatán	10–12	Tooske
7	17 February 2024	'Vooruitblik' (Outlook)	€7,525 → €5,505	Mérida & Cuzamá, Yucatán	12–14	Babs
8	24 February 2024	'Zinvol' (Meaningful)	€5,505 → €7,585	Bacalar, Yucatán	14–16	Rian
9	2 March 2024	'Ontcijferen'	€7,585 → €8,585	Bacalar, Yucatán	16–18	Kees
10	9 March 2024	'De Ontknoping'	€8,585	Amsterdam, Netherlands	Runner-up	Rosario
10	9 March 2024	'De Ontknoping'	€8,585	Amsterdam, Netherlands	Winner	Fons
10	9 March 2024	'De Ontknoping'	€8,585	Amsterdam, Netherlands	The Mole	Anna

== Season summary ==
=== Episode 1 - Een Handje Helpen ===
Episode 1 - Een Handje Helpen
Original airdates: 6 January 2024 Location: Mexico City, Mexico
Assignment	Money earned	Possible earnings
Día Del Top(it)o	—N/a	—N/a
Speeddate	€6,000.-	€10,000.- (Note: During the "Día Del Top(it)o" assignment, up to ten exemptions could be claimed, although only six were. As each exemption removed in the subsequent "Speeddate" assignment would add €1,000 to the pot, a maximum of €10,000 could have been earned for this assignment, although this was listed on-screen as €6,000.)
Afschilderen	€500.-	€2,500.-
Current Pot	€6,500.-	€12,500.-
Execution
Babs	1st player executed	

Día Del Top(it)o - (Day of the Mole)

Each candidate individually enters a fortune teller tent in the middle of a "Dia Del Topo" (Day of the Mole) party and chooses between ten face-down cards presented by a fortune teller. They are instructed to search the party for a partygoer wearing a necklace matching the symbol on the card and ask them for a topito within 10 minutes to earn an Exemption. Afterwards, each candidate who successfully obtained a topito selects between three face-down cards to determine which of the first three episodes they receive that Exemption for.

After each candidate's search, regardless of whether or not they found the topito, the fortune teller reveals to them that the Mole was also at the party searching for the same partygoer in an attempt to steal the topito. In addition, the Mole (in costume) also shook hands with each candidate when they first arrived at the party.

Babs, Kees, and Rian earned an Exemption for Episode 1, Jeroen and Rosario earned an Exemption for Episode 2, and Tooske earned an Exemption for Episode 3.

Speeddate - (Speed Date)

Each candidate meets with host Rik van de Westelaken at Chapultepec Castle, who reveals to them that six candidates received an Exemption in the previous assignment and that they would all go on speed dates to try and find out who has them. In an assignment where candidates meet each other for the first time, each candidate undergoes a one-on-one conversation with every other candidate to discuss who may have received the Exemptions. Afterwards, each candidate privately votes for one candidate they believe earned an Exemption at the previous assignment. If any candidate with an Exemption receives a vote, the group earns €1,000 for the pot and that Exemption is surrendered.

Babs, Jeroen, Kees, Rian, Rosario and Tooske all received at least one vote meaning their Exemptions were revoked and €6,000 was earned for the pot.

Afschilderen - (Depicting)

Candidates divide themselves into three groups: five candidates with a "sharp eye for detail", three candidates who can unlock chests and two candidates with a "good appreciation for artwork".

The five candidates with a sharp eye for detail are taken to the Frida Kahlo park to replicate five self-portraits made by Frida Kahlo within 30 minutes. While painting, the candidates lie on a bed behind a contraption which requires them to lift up a screen to view their assigned portrait, but leave the screen down while painting. Meanwhile, the three candidates tasked with unlocking chests attempt to unlock as many of 25 paintings in chests as possible in 30 minutes: five self-portraits being recreated by the candidates at the park, and twenty modified versions of these paintings. To do so, they find numbers in a painting and use them to unlock the corresponding colored lock to release each painting. Unbeknownst to them, the painting with the combinations only appear when the candidates at the park lift up their screens and comes out of view each time the screens are lowered.

The final two candidates are then presented with all the unlocked paintings, and the five replicas painted by the candidates at the park. If any of the 25 paintings are still locked, they can pay €100 per painting to unlock them as well. Afterwards, one of these candidates must describe the five replica paintings the other must search among the unlocked (and bought if they chose to) portraits for the five matching ones. For each replica correctly matched with its original portrait, €500 is added to the pot.

=== Episode 2 - Afgelopen? ===
Episode 2 - Afgelopen?
Original airdates: 13 January 2024 Location: Mexico City, Mexico & Mineral del Chico, Hidalgo
Assignment	Money earned	Possible earnings
Molympische Spelen	€0.-	€1,968.-
Uitzitten	€1,250.-	€4,000.-
Pot Count (Note: The group earned €7,750 during the first two episodes. However, when treasurer Justin counted the money in the pot at the end episode 2, €250 was missing, therefore reducing the pot to €7,500 at the time. Following Justin's execution at the end of episode 3, he revealed that he hid the money in his possession and returned it to the pot before selecting the next treasurer.)	-€250.-	—N/a
Current Pot	€7,500.-	€18,468.-
Execution
Jip	2nd player executed	

Molympische Spelen - (Molympic Games)

The group select six candidates to run the track of the Estadio Olímpico Universitario for the assignment, while the three remaining candidates begin in the stands. Five of the six runners complete a relay race, running 100 metres each, to transfer envelopes containing instructions to a sixth runner at the end of the who announces the instructions via microphone to the three candidates in the stands to follow.

Every two envelopes delivered form a full set of instructions detailing which seats of the stands to place green panels on. The three candidates follow these directions announced to them and place the panels on the required seats to form a secret number, which is how much money earn with that set of directions. After forming an amount, the group can light the stadium's Olympic flame to claim the money (thereby ending the assignment), or try to form the next amount from subsequent sets of envelopes which form increasingly higher values, with the final set forming €1,968. However, pursuing these come at the risk of losing time as there is a 45-minute time limit.

Uitzitten - (Sit Out)

The group must select five "Daredevils" for the assignment, with the remaining four candidates competing in an undisclosed portion for the assignment.

The five daredevils are taken to Mineral del Chico to complete a two-hour mountaineering course while listening to podcasts. Each candidate must select one of five colored helmets to wear; four of the helmets play one podcast about varying aspects of Mexico on repeat while the fifth white helmet plays all four podcasts. At the end of the course, the four candidates not wearing the white helmet must answer four trivia questions about their podcast, with each correct answer earning €250 for the pot. If they are unsure about the answer to a question, they can leave it for the fifth candidate wearing the white helmet to answer instead. However, if this candidate answers incorrectly, €250 is instead deducted from the pot.

Meanwhile, the remaining four candidates are taken to a recreational rooftop terrace. Upon arrival, they are invited to "take a seat" by host Rik van de Westelaken before being left alone for two hours. Unbeknownst to them, these are secretly also the instructions for their part of the assignment. Each time the candidates at the terrace stand up, the podcasts of the five daredevils are interrupted with music, making it harder for them to memorize the information.

=== Episode 3 - Vragenvuur ===
Episode 3 - Vragenvuur
Original airdates: 20 January 2024 Location: Mexico City, Mexico
Assignment	Money earned	Possible earnings
De Violen Stemmen	€400.-	€2,000.-
Stad En Land Aflopen	€600.-	€2,000.-
Er Mee Worstelen	€75.-	€2,025.-
Episode 3 execution	€250.-	—N/a
Current Pot	€8,825.-	€24,493.-
Execution
Justin	3rd player executed	

De Violen Stemmen - (The Violins' Voices)

During dinner, the group is given the chance to earn money by listening to up to ten songs played by a mariachi band and answering two trivia questions about each song. To listen to a song, the group must pay €200 from the pot, although they earn €400 for the pot if they answer both questions for the song correctly. The group can end the assignment at any time without necessarily paying to listen to every song.

Stad En Land Aflopen - (City and Country Descent)

Starting in pairs, each pair begins at different points around Zona Rosa equipped with a map and walkie talkies to communicate with other candidates. The group work together to navigate Zona Rosa and find eight intersections marked on the map.

Each intersection is assigned to two candidates which must be determined by solving two clues at the location. For each intersection, €150 is added to the pot if both candidates are there at the same time. Once two candidates meet at their designated intersection, they then open an envelope to find a list of two cities and must determine which one is further from Amsterdam.

The group can also earn a bonus €800 by using the cities they answered at each intersection to solve a doorloper puzzle, a puzzle similar to a crossword but in a grid, located at a nearby bar. For each row of the puzzle are the names of two cities as clues. While not explicitly stated, the group must figure out these are actually the names of the connecting streets for each intersection, and fill in that row with the city that they determined to be further from Amsterdam at that intersection. There is a 45-minute time limit for the assignment.

Er Mee Worstelen - (Struggling With It)

The group selects four candidates to attend a lucha libre event at the Arena Coliseo. During the event, each candidate individually takes selfies of themselves and the 27 wrestlers on the stage. However, each selfie can only contain one wrestler, and incorrectly taken selfies are not accepted.

Meanwhile, two other candidates begin outside the Arena Coliseo and attempt to determine the name and appearance of each wrestler performing at the event, usually by asking passersby for the information or finding relevant memorabilia. They must then draw each of the wrestlers at the event, and include the name of the wrestler, based on the information they find out.

The selfies and drawings are forwarded to the final two candidates in a hotel room. For each drawing, they must match four selfies of that same wrestler from the event. For each drawing of a correctly-named wrestler matched with the four correctly-taken selfies from the event, €75 is added to the pot.

=== Episode 4 - Revanche ===
Episode 4 - Revanche
Original airdates: 27 January 2024 Location: Mexico City, Mexico, Celestún & Mérida, Yucatán
Assignment	Money earned	Possible earnings
Kijken, Kijken, Wel Kopen	€700.-	€3,000.-
Hoog Spel Spelen	—N/a	—N/a
Op Het Spel Zetten	−€500.-	€3,500.-
Current Pot	€9,025.-	€30,993.-
Jokers
Fons, Kees, Rosario & Tooske	Kijken, Kijken, Wel Kopen	

Kijken, Kijken, Wel Kopen - (Watch, Watch, Buy)

The group divide themselves into three candidates with a "hole in the hand" and four candidates who "prefer to keep their money close".

Before the assignment, host Rik van de Westelaken bought ten items from a market worth €250 in total. The three candidates with a "hole in the hand" are taken to the market and have 45 minutes to buy up to ten items that are more expensive than Rik's, and pair them with an item bought by Rik. They are initially given €100 to spend, however this budget can be increased by the other four candidates during their part of the assignment. After their part of the assignment, the four remaining candidates attempt to guess which item in each pair was bought by their fellow candidates (the one they believe to be more expensive), with each correct guess earning money for the pot.

Meanwhile, the four candidates who "prefer to keep their money close" ride bicycles down the Paseo de la Reforma and attempt to increase the shopping budget for the candidates at the market along the way. To do so, they must find locals along the road wearing a Mole shirt, call the phone number on the shirt and follow the call instructions to add the designated amount of money to the budget. However, the longer they call for, the less money each item they later guess correctly is worth, and there is a maximum of 30 minutes call time in total. Unbeknownst to candidates at first, they can also follow a different set of instructions on the call (usually to hold for a certain time or answer a question) to earn Jokers or Exemptions for themselves instead. Candidates cannot have the phone on speaker mode, meaning the candidate holding the phone is responsible for following the instructions of the call to earn the money, Jokers or Exemptions.

In a twist unknown to the remaining candidates, the three eliminated candidates (Babs, Jip and Justin) are given an assignment which allows one of them to later return to the game if successful. After each of their executions, the eliminated contestants were given a topito. They must work together to search the market for four books with a Mayan symbols on them which hold keys inside, use the keys to unlock a chest and place their topito pieces in the chest to form a topo without being seen by the other candidates at the market. If they are successful, one eliminated candidate later returns to the game. Otherwise, all three of them remain eliminated.

€700 was earned from the pot. The eliminated contestants successfully formed the topo without being detected, therefore guaranteeing that one of them later return to the game. Additionally, Kees, Rosario and Tooske earned one Joker, and Fons earned two.

Hoog Spel Spelen - (Play High Game)

As they were successful in the "Kijken, Kijken, Wel Kopen" assignment, one of the three eliminated candidates will return to the game. Babs, Jip and Justin compete to stack twelve multisided blocks to form a tower as fast as possible. The faster they finish, the greater chance they have of returning to the game.

The eliminated candidates are then locked in boxes latched with different locks. After the "Op Het Spel Zetten" assignment, one candidate still in the game (unaware of the twist at the time) is given the chance to select one of ten keys and use them to unlock one of the boxes containing an eliminated candidate. Six keys unlock the box of the eliminated candidate who stacked their tower first, three of the keys unlock the box of the second eliminated candidate to finish while one key unlocks the box of the third eliminated candidate. The candidate who has their box opened returns to the game.

Revealed at the start of the next episode, Babs' box was the one opened, allowing her to return to the game.

Op Het Spel Zetten - (To Put at Stake)

Candidates divide themselves into two boats, which form their groups for the assignment, for a boat ride. Each group attempts to solve several puzzles to earn money for the pot during the ride. Each puzzle is worth different amounts of money based on its difficulty. If a group starts a puzzle and leaves it incomplete or solve it incorrectly, a certain amount of money is deducted from the pot instead.

=== Episode 5 - Terugkeer ===
Episode 5 - Terugkeer?
Original airdates: 3 February 2024 Location: Mérida & Yaxcabá, Yucatán
Assignment	Money earned	Possible earnings
Op Elkaar Rekenen	€0.-	€2,008.-
Het Gebaande Pad?	-€1,750.-	€38,640.-
Afwegen	-€3,250.-	€2,000.-
Current Pot	€4,025.-	€73,641.-
Jokers
Tooske	Afwegen	
Execution
Jeroen	4th player executed	

Op Elkaar Rekenen - (Counting on Each Other)

The group divide themselves into four pairs and are tasked with figuring out the undisclosed amount of money the assignment is worth (€2,008) to add that amount to the pot if they are correct.

The group select one pair to be given a clue —the numbers 17, 19, 21 and 38— before being taken to a park with dozens of colored flags. There, they must count the number of flags for each color. Meanwhile, each of the remaining three pairs ride a horse-drawn carriage to the same park. Along the way they must look for various colored signs and note the money amount written on the back of each sign.

Once all three pairs reach the park and meet with the pair counting flags, the group is given five minutes to communicate information from their parts of the assignment and determine the amount the assignment is worth. To correctly determine the unknown amount, the candidates must figure out that the numbers in the clue correspond to the counts of the yellow, blue, orange and green flags at the park before adding the money amounts on the back of those corresponding signs to get the answer of €2,008.

No money was earned for the pot.

Het Gebaande Pad? - (The Beaten Path?)

The group is taken to a plaza with several Mole-shaped piñatas and telephones, where they are informed that they have 45 minutes to find the location where €38,640 is hidden (a villa in Mérida) to add it to the pot.

Throughout the assignment, the telephones ring and the candidate assigned to the call is given a clue about a piñata to break. They must search among the piñata for one with the answer on it (figuring out that the blank in the answer must be filled in with "Mol") and break it to obtain part of a map inside. However, €250 is deducted from the pot for each incorrect piñata broken. Once all the map pieces are combined, a route to the location of the money forms and two candidates can enter a car to direct the driver to that location.

Unbeknownst to candidates until afterwards, the Mole uses a telephone to talk with Dennis Weening (the Mole of season 8) during the assignment and instructs him to shred the €38,640 in the room (the money he kept out of the pot through his sabotage in season 8).

Afwegen - (Weigh)

Each candidate individually meets with Rik at the Yaxuná archeological site where they are informed that they will later walk down a path containing nine envelopes and select one of them. Some of these envelopes currently contain money, with up to €2,000 to be earned overall.

However, candidates are also given the chance to try and claim up to three jokers or a topito for themselves instead. If three candidates find a topito, they can combine them to form a topo which gives all of them an Exemption. If candidates choose to risk the chance of winning a Joker or topo, an envelope on the path is replaced with an envelope containing their desired prize. However, other envelopes along the path are also replaced with envelopes that deduct money from the pot depending on the prize they choose (one per Joker and four for the topo). After choosing what prize they want to try and earn, if any, candidates walk down the now-modified path and select one of the nine envelopes to claim its contents.

€3,250 was deducted from the pot. Tooske also earned three Jokers.

=== Episode 6 - Afvragen ===
Episode 6 - Afvragen
Original airdates: 10 February 2024 Location: Mérida & Ticul, Yucatán
Assignment	Money earned	Possible earnings
Niets Is Iets	€1,500.-	€2,500.-
Bij Elkaar Passen	€2,000.-	€3,000.-
Current Pot	€7,525.-	€79,141.-
Execution
Tooske	5th player executed	

Niets Is Iets - (Nothing is Something)

The group must search the Hacienda Xocnaceh for stone blocks with Mayan numerals on them and stack them on four tables so that the negative number written on each table becomes zero once the numbers on the stones are added on it. After forming each stack, they must also add a stone with the number zero on top to complete it, and the stack cannot be modified afterwards. Around the ground is also an instruction board on how to read the numerals which can be communicated via walkie-talkies. €100 is added to the pot for one correctly-stacked tower within the 25-minute time-limit; €500 for two correct towers; €1,500 for three correct towers and €2,500 if all four towers are correct.

Bij Elkaar Passen - (Matching)

The group attend a dance class to learn a traditional Yucatán dance.

Later that night, candidates (still in their dance costume) are taken to a party and are spread out around the dance floor where a group of dancers are performing Mexican dances. During each Yucatán dance, host Rik van de Westelaken informs a candidate of two characteristics regarding a dancer's costume; this candidate must then tell these characteristics to the next candidate, with this process continuing until all candidates are informed. Afterwards, two candidates are randomly chosen and have 30 seconds to ask dancers whose costumes do not match the given characteristics to leave the dance floor. This process continues until only five dancers remain on the dance floor. For each remaining dancer correctly matching all the characteristics given by Rik, €500 is added to the pot. Afterwards, the group is given the chance to win a bonus €500 if they are able to determine which candidates in the group match all the characteristics given throughout the assignment.

Analogue Test

Candidates walk down a path to the laptop where they take the test on. The 20 quiz questions of the test are placed on signs along the path. Once they reach the laptop, they can start the test, although the laptop only displays the multiple-choice options for each question and not the questions themselves.

=== Episode 7 - Vooruitblik ===
Episode 7 - Vooruitblik
Original airdates: 17 February 2024 Location: Mérida & Cuzamá, Yucatán
Assignment	Money earned	Possible earnings
Genoten	€800.-	€2,000.-
Overbrengen	€180.-	€1,500.-
Uitkomst Bieden	-€3,000.-	€3,000.-
Current Pot	€5,505.-	€85,641.-
Exemption
Kees	Uitkomst Bieden	
Execution
Babs	6th player executed	

Genoten - (Enjoyed)

The group have 20 minutes to complete five music-related challenges around the Yucatán School of Arts. For each challenge completed, the group receive part of the sheet music for the Wie is de Mol? theme song ("Oratio" by Ugo Farrell) which they must give to a conductor so he can conduct an orchestra to play the music. Each sheet given to the conductor earns €400 for the pot, and each candidate can only participate in a maximum of two challenges.

Overbrengen - (Convey)

Around the village of Cuzamá are 30 locals waiting to be picked up and taken to a restaurant for lunch. The group must select two candidates to prepare the restaurant for the lunch. The other four candidates must drive tuk tuks around Cuzamá, find the locals waiting to be picked up along the roads and drive as many of them to the restaurant as possible within 30 minutes. Candidates are also advised to learn as much information as they can about the locals as they can, and that they would later be tested on this knowledge.

After lunch, it is revealed that the group must arrange the locals in alphabetical order by first name. For all locals in a correct position before an error is made, their ages are added together and the total is doubled to determine the amount of money added to the pot.

The group arranged four locals in the correct order before an error was made, and their combined ages summed to 88. This was doubled to add €176 to the pot which host Rik van de Westelaken then rounded to €180.

Uitkomst Bieden - (To Offer a Solution)

Each candidate privately meets with host Rik van de Westelaken at the Hacienda Yaxcopoil and are presented with a dilemma. They can choose to read ten questions on the final quiz of the season, at the cost of €500 from the pot, or leave the questions unread. If no candidates read the questions, €3,000 is added to the pot. The dilemma also states that integrity would "be rewarded".

Afterwards, each candidate who did read the questions individually meets Rik again where they can bid, with money from the pot, to name a candidate they believe did read the questions. If the candidate who bids the most money correctly names a candidate who read the questions, they win an exemption and the money they bid is removed from the pot.

Fons and Rosrio decided to read the questions, which deducted €1,000 from the pot. Afterwards, Kees had the highest bid of €2,000 and correctly guessed that Fons read the questions, earning himself an exemption and resulting in €2,000 being removed from the pot. Overall €3,000 was removed from the pot.

=== Episode 8 - Zinvol ===
Episode 8 - Zinvol
Original airdates: 24 February 2024 Location: Bacalar, Yucatán
Assignment	Money earned	Possible earnings
Overtuigend?	€2,000.-	€5,000.-
Goed Op Dreef?	€80.-	€1,650.-
Current Pot	€7,585.-	€92,291.-
Jokers
Rosario	Overtuigend?	
Execution
Rian	7th player executed	

Overtuigend? - (Convincing?)

Each candidate privately ranks their fellow candidates from who they believe to be most to least trustworthy. Afterwards, the candidate ranked as the most trustworthy overall, Rosario, is taken to the finish line of the assignment. The remaining four candidates are assigned time-limits for the assignment based on how trustworthy they were ranked, with the candidate ranked least trustworthy given the least time. These four candidates then participate in a laser game around the Hotel Bacalaria for the chance to earn money for the pot or earn Jokers for themselves.

Around the hotel are four challenges worth €500, €1,000, €1,500 and €2,000; each challenge requires one candidate to stack a one-level house of cards to collect the money, however, they can stack two or three levels instead to collect one or two Jokers respectively. Each candidate can only complete one challenge and must bring the contents from the challenge to the finish line before their individual time-limit expires. Around the hotel are also security guards who attempt to shoot laser beams at candidates. Each time a candidate is hit, their individual time-limit is reduced by two minutes.

After proceeding to the finish line with either the money or Joker(s), each candidate meets Rosario there. Rosario can decide whether to let each of the other four candidates cross the finish line, adding the money to the pot if they collected money but giving them the Joker(s) if they chose it, or to shoot them with a laser gun to obtain any Joker(s) they collected for himself with any money collected lost as a consequence.

Rosario decided to allow Rian to cross the finish line, adding €2,000 to the pot. He decided to shoot the other three candidates and collected one Joker, from Fons, as a result.

Goed Op Dreef? - (Well On Your Way?)

Four candidates are divided into two boats and attempt to collect words from the bottom of the Mariscal Lagoon with a wire and magnet. They must bring the words to a fifth candidate (the candidate ranked least trustworthy in the previous assignment) who arranges the words to form sentences, each with a maximum of 11 words. There are 55 words around the lagoon, however candidates do not need to collect them all, and are penalized €100 for any collected words left unused. For each grammatically correct sentence formed within 45 minutes, each word in that sentence adds €30 to the pot.

=== Episode 9 - Ontcijferen ===
Episode 9 - Ontcijferen
Original airdates: 2 March 2024 Location: Bacalar, Yucatán
Assignment	Money earned	Possible earnings
Op Je Tellen Passen	€1,000.-	€4,000.-
Per Slot Van Rekening	€0.-	€3,870.-
Final Pot	€8,585.-	€100,161.-
Execution
Kees	8th player executed	

Op Je Tellen Passen - (Taking Care of You)

Each candidate must select a locked bag worth varying amounts of money before the group undergo a zipline course through the Tirolesas Kan Kin Bacalar. At the end of three ziplines are labelled anatomy diagrams of Aluxes which candidates must memorize. At each of these three points, one candidate attempts to solve a math puzzle in a faster time than the Mole ,who attempted the puzzle beforehand. This candidate can continue along the course if they are successful, but must stay behind if they fail. At the end of the course, each remaining candidate is asked a trivia question about the Alux diagrams and can unlock the money in their bag if they answer correctly.

Per Slot Van Rekening - (After All)

Four platforms with 20 keys each are spread around the Pirates Channel. Two candidates must dive underwater to listen to names played on the music boxes and tell these names to the remaining two candidates who remove keys labelled with these names from the platforms until four keys remain. Candidates then board a boat and travel to the Castillo de San Felipe where they find four locked chests, one of which contain €1,935. They can try their four keys (one of which unlocks the money if they removed all the required keys before) to unlock the money, or only try one key which doubles the money if correct. There is a 45-minute time limit for the assignment.

No money was earned for the pot, leaving the final pot at €8,585.

Final quiz

Before the final quiz, the four remaining candidates meet with the fortune teller from the "Día Del Top(it)o" assignment in the first episode. They are quickly shown several images of people in makeup and costume from the party of the first assignment. Among these photos was a photo of the Mole who shook hands with candidates when they first arrived. Candidates then take the final quiz where the lowest scoring candidate is eliminated while the remaining three progress to the finale.

=== Episode 10 - De Ontknoping (Finale) ===
Episode 10 - De Ontknoping
Original airdates: 9 March 2024
Location: Amsterdam, Netherlands
Runner-up
Rosario Mussendijk
Winner
Fons Hendriks
The Mole
Anna Gimbrère

The live finale was held at the Vondelpark in Amsterdam, Netherlands. Anna was revealed as the Mole, Rosario finished as the runner-up and Fons was declared the winner of the season.

== Mole activity ==
The following Mole activity were revealed in the finale or on the show's website:

Día Del Top(it)o: Anna was at the party in costume where she shook hands with each candidate as they arrived. Anna also stole the topito of three other candidates by finding it faster than them.

Speeddate: Even though taking the Exemptions out of the game added money to the pot, Anna suggested that each candidate votes for the candidate they first had a conversation with to guarantee the Exemptions were taken out to gain trust.

Afschilderen: Anna was in the group that unlocked the paintings. As the Mole, she knew which paintings were the correct ones that the five candidates were replicating and did not unlock them. She also pretended to hear the codes incorrectly to waste time.

Molympische Spelen: The green panels in stands began already placed on the seats. During her turn as the candidate with the microphone announcing instructions, Anna did not inform the three candidates in the stand to remove them first which made the assignment more difficult. Later, she also announced the directions rapidly and all at once which made them difficult to comprehend.

Uitzitten: Anna was in the group which completed the mountaineering course while listening to podcasts. As the Mole, Anna knew of all the upcoming questions and frequently asked other candidates about information she knew would not be relevant to distract them. She also later answered all her questions incorrectly.

Stad En Land Aflopen: Anna stole the clues from some intersections to make it more difficult to identify which two candidates had to meet there.

Er Mee Worstelen: Anna and Jeroen were the pair tasked with identifying and drawing the 27 wrestlers of the lucha libre event that night. Anna frequently drew wrestlers she knew were not at the event.

Op Het Spel Zetten: Anna did not solve any of the puzzles.

Het Gebaande Pad?: During the assignment, Anna received a phone call from Dennis Weening (the Mole of season 8) and told him the key villa was hidden under the doormat. This gave Dennis entry to the villa where he shredded the money. Anna also broke four incorrect piñatas which deducted €1,000 from the pot.

Niets Is Iets: Anna hid some of the required blocks behind trees during the assignment.

Bij Elkaar Passen: Anna knew of all the characteristics Rik would tell the candidates. After being told of one of the characteristics, Anna told the next candidate different characteristics. She also did not correct one of the characteristics incorrectly told to her.

Overbrengen: Each local who had to be picked up wore a symbol around their neck so they could be identified. Anna was one of the four candidates tasked with picking up these locals and driving them to the restaurant. After finding several locals, Anna asked for their symbols and discarded them so the local would not be picked up by other candidates, and tried to collect as few locals as possible. Additionally, as one of the few remaining candidates who spoke some Spanish, Anna asked one of the locals named Charlie to introduce himself as "Carlos" to other candidates, leading to him being placed in the incorrect alphabetical position.

Uitkomst Bieden: Anna did not read the ten questions of the final quiz in the dilemma as she already knew the answers as the Mole.

Overtuigend?: Anna knew that Rosario did not trust her and would likely shoot her. She took the money to the finish line to appear trustworthy, where she was ultimately shot.

Goed Op Dreef?: Anna collected words that would be difficult to use in a sentence as any collected words left unused would deduct money from the pot. She also threw away several words throughout the assignment.

Op Je Tellen Passen: As the Mole, Anna completed the puzzles beforehand and knew of their difficulty. Anna believed Kees would struggle with the puzzle and encouraged him to be one of the three candidates to have to solve a puzzle to progress along the course.

Per Slot Van Rekening: Throughout the assignment, Anna frequently dropped keys into the water, including the correct key which would have unlocked the money (tagged with "Santa Anna").

== Hidden clues ==
The following hidden clues were revealed in the finale and on the show's website.

Día Del Top(it)o: The party that candidates attended was for the "Día Del Topo" (Day of the Mole). This episode aired on January 6, which is also Anna's birthday, and there were birthday balloons at the party as a further clue. Later, all the cards that candidates could choose from the fortune teller depicted hands with white nails; Anna frequently wore white nail polish throughout the season. Additionally, episode 1 was titled "Een Handje Helpen" (A Helping Hand), which was also a reference to the fact that Anna (in costume) also shook hands with candidates as they arrived at the party.

Afschilderen: The number combinations on the painting added up to 13,943, which was the exact number of days Anna had been alive on the day of the finale where she revealed herself as the Mole - March 9, 2024.

Bij Elkaar Passen and Analogue Test: After the "Bij Elkaar Passen" assignment, host Rik van de Westelaken told the contestants that the next test would be "partly analogue." This was a reference to the Analogue Test, where questions were placed on signs along a path instead of on the computer. Phonetically, "Analogue" could be split into "Anna" (the name of the Mole) and loog (lied).

Genoten: One of the music challenges required candidates to place musical notes on a music staff to complete the song "Brother John". The flat symbol ♭ (derived from Italian be molle) was already placed on the A position of the staff when it should be on the B for the actual song. This was a hint to "De Mol on the A" (The Mole on the A), a reference to Anna's name.

== Reception ==
=== Viewing figures ===
Viewing Figures
#	Title	Air Date	Time Slot	Average	Total
1	Een Handje Helpen	January 6, 2024	Saturday 20.30 CET	3,717,000	4,361,000
2	Afgelopen?	January 13, 2024	Saturday 20.30 CET	3,570,000	4,087,000
3	Vragenvuur	January 20, 2024	Saturday 20.30 CET	3,479,000	3,957,000
4	Revanche	January 27, 2024	Saturday 20.30 CET	3,172,000	3,625,000
5	Terugkeer	February 3, 2024	Saturday 20.30 CET	3,101,000	3,655,000
6	Afvragen	February 10, 2024	Saturday 20.30 CET	3,196,000	3,644,000
7	Vooruitblik	February 17, 2024	Saturday 20.30 CET	3,049,000	3,584,000
8	Zinvol	February 24, 2024	Saturday 20.30 CET	3,150,000	3,633,000
9	Ontcijferen	March 2, 2024	Saturday 20.30 CET	2,983,000	3,442,000
10	De Ontknoping	March 9, 2024	Saturday 20.30 CET	3,074,000	3,783,000
