= Merel Westrik =

Dutch news presenter and television host

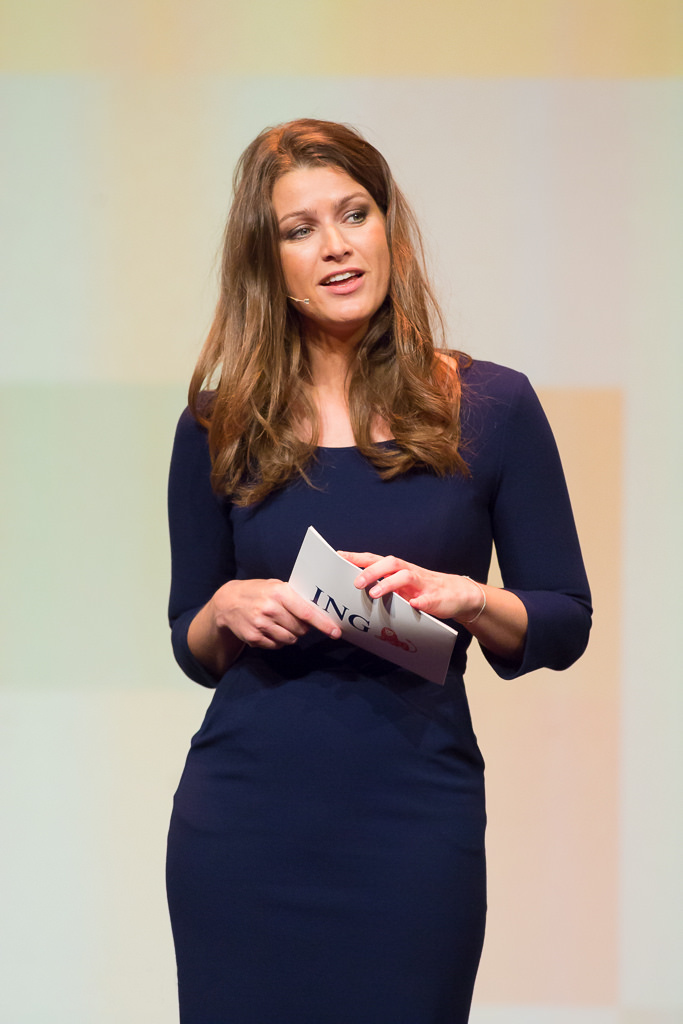
- Westrik in 2014
- Born: 1 November 1979 (age 46); Wormer, Netherlands
- Occupations: News presenter, host

Merel Westrik (born 1 November 1979 in Wormer, Netherlands) is a Dutch news presenter and television host. She is known for the Dutch reality television series Wie is de Mol?, and became the new presenter of the fictional news television series Het Sinterklaasjournaal, replacing her predecessor, Dieuwertje Blok.

Westrik and urban ecologist Martin Melchers created multiple nature documentary films about wildlife in the city of Amsterdam, Netherlands: Haring in 't IJ (2009), Amsterdam Wildlife (2015) and Amsterdam Wildlife by Night (2026).

== Career ==
=== Television ===
Westrik presented the news for AT5, a local television station of Amsterdam. She worked for AT5 from 2001 to 2011. Westrik presented the shows Vandaag de Dag and Half 8 Live! for broadcasting association WNL.

In 2013, she was a contestant in four episodes of the quiz show De slimste mens. She was also a contestant in 2025. In April 2014, she became a presenter of RTL Nieuws.

In 2019, Westrik participated in the reality television show Wie is de Mol? playing the role of the mole. She was correctly identified by actress Sarah Chronis who won the prize money of €10,150. In February 2019, Westrik participated in the game show Weet Ik Veel and she won that episode of the show. In the summer of 2019, she was also a co-presenter during one week of the talk show Zomer met Art alongside Art Rooijakkers as main presenter.

Westrik worked for RTL until 2019 and she then switched to Net5 (Talpa TV). In 2019 and 2020, Westrik presented the talk show Ladies Night. Westrik and Rik van de Westelaken competed as duo in a 2020 episode of the quiz show Deze quiz is voor jou. In the same year, she appeared in an episode of Wie is de Mol? Renaissance, a season to celebrate the 20th anniversary season of the show Wie is de Mol?.

In 2021, Westrik appeared in an episode of Verborgen verleden in which she explores her family history. She presented the 2022 television show Grenzeloos Verliefd: baby in het buitenland in which she visits pregnant Dutch women who live abroad. It was the last television show which she presented for Net5 (Talpa). From May 2024 to March 2026, she presented the news during the morning radio show De Coen & Sander Show hosted by Coen Swijnenberg and Sander Lantinga. Westrik was a contestant in the 2025 anniversary season of the television show Wie is de Mol?. She won this season of the show by correctly identifying Nathan Rutjes as the mole. In 2026, she was a guest in an episode of the television show Dit was het nieuws.

The show Het Sinterklaasjournaal won the Machiavelliprijs 2025 for its contributions to public communication and its role in building connection in Dutch society. Westrik and Jeroen Kramer received the award at the award ceremony in April 2026. As of June 2026, she is scheduled to present the fifth season of the painting talent television show Project Rembrandt. The previous seasons of the show were presented by Annechien Steenhuizen but she is unable to present the show for personal reasons. As of September 2026, Westrik and Leo Blokhuis are scheduled to present the music quiz show De Grote Top 2000 Quiz.

=== Film ===
Westrik and urban ecologist Martin Melchers created the nature documentary film Haring in 't IJ which premiered in 2009. They also created the documentary Amsterdam Wildlife which was shown in the Eye Filmmuseum. The documentary premiered in December 2015 and won the Kristallen Film award in April 2017 after reaching more than 10,000 visitors. In 2026, they created the documentary Amsterdam Wildlife by Night which is also shown in the Eye Filmmuseum.

=== Other ===
In September 2026, Westrik became head of the jury of the Woutertje Pieterse Prijs, an annual Dutch literary award for the best children's book of the preceding year. She succeeded Rik van de Westelaken in this role.

== Personal life ==
Westrik is in a relationship with journalist Pepijn Crone and they have a daughter together. Their daughter was born in 2021.

Her sister Kirsten Westrik presented the television show 112 Vandaag for multiple years.

== Selected filmography ==
=== As presenter ===
- RTL Nieuws (2014 – 2019)
- Vandaag de Dag
- Half 8 Live!
- Ladies Night (2019, 2020)
- Grenzeloos Verliefd: baby in het buitenland (2022)
- Het Sinterklaasjournaal (2024 – present)
- De Grote Top 2000 Quiz (2026, upcoming)
- Project Rembrandt (2027, upcoming)

=== As contestant ===
- De slimste mens (2013, 2025)
- Weet Ik Veel (2019)
- Wie is de Mol? (2019)
- Deze quiz is voor jou (2020)
- Waku Waku (2025)
- Wie is de Mol? (2025, anniversary season)

=== As herself ===
- Verborgen verleden (2021)
- Dit was het nieuws (2026)
- Boerderij van Dorst (upcoming)
