= Roos Moggré =

Dutch news presenter

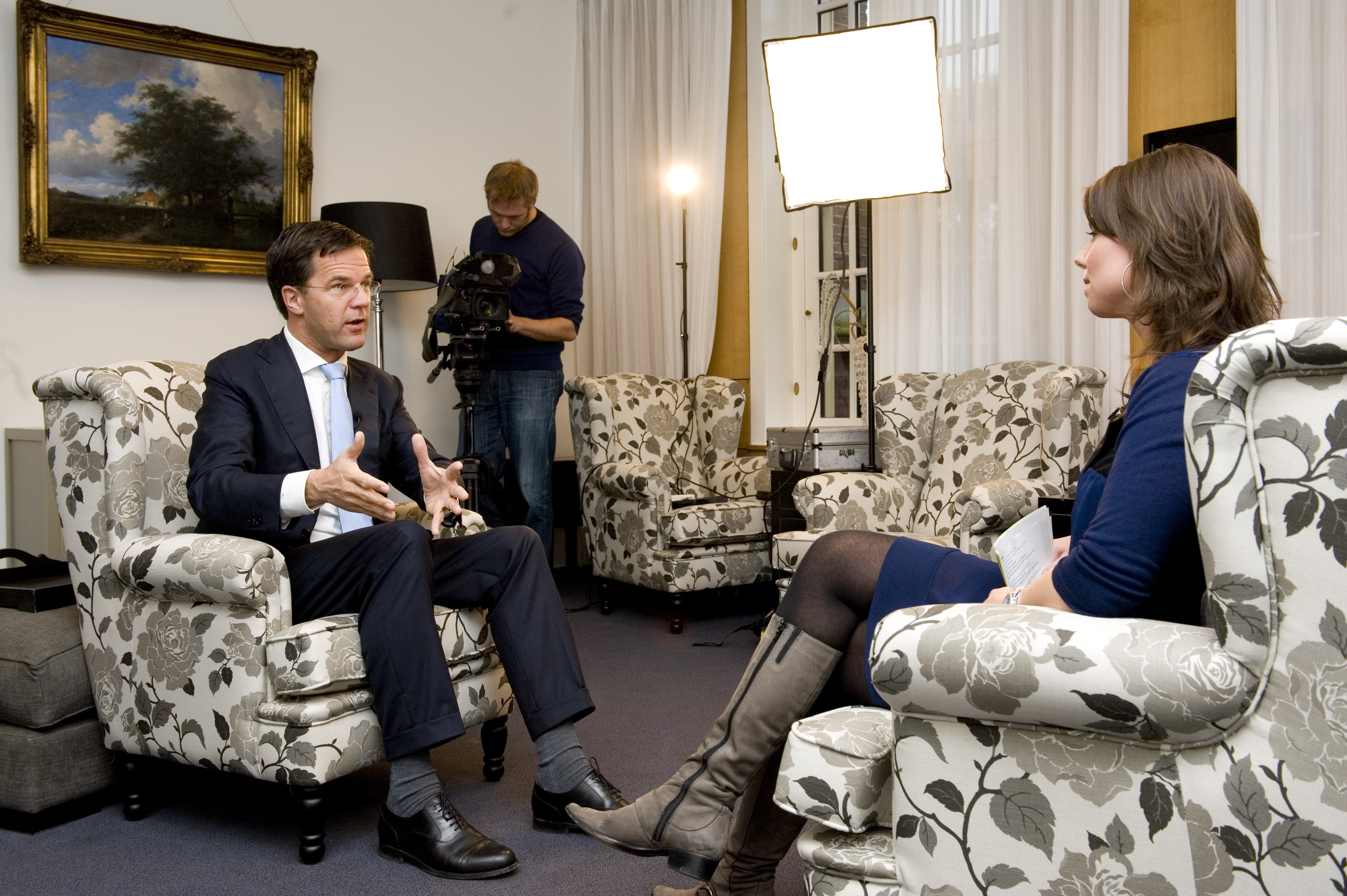
- Moggré (right) interviewing Mark Rutte in 2010
- Born: Rozemarijn Moggré; 6 July 1981 (age 45); Strijen, Netherlands
- Education: Utrecht University
- Spouse: Donatello Piras (2018–)
- Presenting career
- Show: EenVandaag
- Stations: NPO 1; NPO Radio 1
- Network: AVROTROS
- Previous shows: NOS Jeugdjournaal; NOS Journaal; Goedemorgen Nederland

Rozemarijn "Roos" Moggré (born 6 July 1981) is a Dutch presenter, news anchor and journalist.

== Career ==
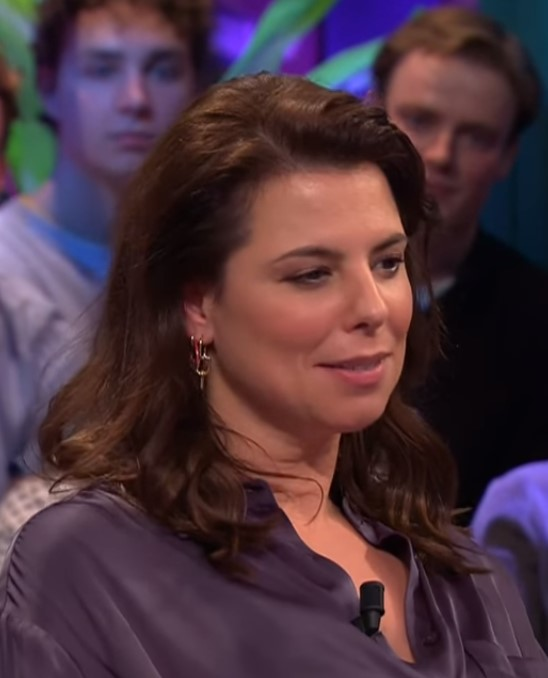
Moggré (2022)

Moggré began her career as presenter at the regional television channel RTV Utrecht. In January 2008, she started working for the Dutch news broadcaster Nederlandse Omroep Stichting (NOS), where she was one of the presenters of the children's news programme NOS Jeugdjournaal. She later also presented the morning and afternoon broadcasts of the news programme NOS Journaal.

In September 2014, she switched to the broadcasting organization WNL, where she presented the programme Goedemorgen Nederland ("Good Morning Netherlands"). In 2018, she replaced Jojanneke van den Berge – who was on maternity leave – as presenter of the AVROTROS programme EenVandaag. She is now one of the permanent presenters of the programme, both on radio and on television.

On 24 February 2020, it was announced that she, together with Andrew Makkinga, would host the press conferences of the Eurovision Song Contest 2020, to be held in Rotterdam, Netherlands. However, this edition of the contest was later cancelled due to the COVID-19 pandemic.

She won the 25th season of the television show Wie is de Mol?.

== Personal life ==
Moggré studied journalism at the University of Applied Sciences Utrecht, as well as international relations at Utrecht University. She completed part of her studies in the United States. Moggré married Donatello Piras in 2018, together they have a daughter and a son.
