= Wie is de Mol? (Dutch TV series) season 25 =

Dutch reality television season

Wie is de Mol?
- Season 25
- Presented by: Rik van de Westelaken
- No. of contestants: 10
- Winner: Roos Moggré
- Runner-up: Maaike Martens
- Location: Cambodia
- The Mole: Stijn de Vries
- No. of episodes: 10

Release
- Original network: AVROTROS (NPO 1)
- Original release: 4 January – 8 March 2025

Season chronology
- ← Previous; Season 24: Mexico Next → 25th Anniversary season

The twenty-fifth season of the Dutch TV series Wie is de Mol? ("Who is the Mole?") premiered on AVROTROS on 4 January 2025. The season, hosted by Rik van de Westelaken, was filmed in Cambodia and featured ten candidates.

One week prior to the premiere, a special episode called Kick-off Wie Is de Mol? aired on AVROTROS, which featured the ten candidates recapping their preparation for Cambodia and previewing the forthcoming episodes of the season.

== Candidates ==
The ten candidates were announced by AVROTROS on 14 November 2024.

Candidate	Occupation	Day Exited	Result
Stijn de Vries	Photographer and documentary maker	18	The Mole
Roos Moggré	Journalist and presenter	18	Winner
Maaike Martens	Actress	18	2nd place
Sophie Frankenmolen	TV producer and journalist	16	3rd place
Nora Akachar	Actress and presenter	14	4th place
Sam Hagens	Political reporter	12	5th place
Bridget Maasland	TV presenter	10	6th place
Ray Klaassens	Former commando	8	7th place
Gabriël Martina	Wildlife content creator	6	8th place
Teun Luijkx	Actor	4	9th place

== Candidate progress ==
Candidate	Episode								
Candidate	1 (Note: In episode 1, there was no Execution as no Mole had yet been selected, and therefore the results of the quiz were disregarded.)	2	3	4	5	6	7	8	Finale
Roos		1st (1)			2nd	5th	1st		Winner
Stijn		2nd (1)	(1)	3rd		2nd	3rd	exempt	The Mole
Maaike		6th			1st (1)	4th		(2)	Runner-Up
Sophie		4th		2nd (1)		1st	2nd	Executed	
Nora			2nd		3rd	3rd	Executed		
Sam		3rd	(1)	1st		Executed			
Bridget		5th	(1)		Executed				
Ray			1st	Executed					
Gabriël			Executed						
Teun		Executed							

Key
The candidate won the season.
The candidate was revealed as the Mole.
The candidate finished as the runner-up.
The candidate saw a Green Screen, in the order stated, and proceeded to the next episode.
The candidate did not see a Green Screen before the Executed player saw their Red Screen. Thus they proceeded to the next episode.
The candidate received an Exemption to automatically proceed to the next episode.
The candidate was Executed from the game.

For candidates who used Jokers to correct an incorrect answer on a quiz, the amount are presented in parentheses.

== Episodes ==
Episode	Air Date	Title	Amount in Pot (Note: Pot earnings: indicates an increase indicates no change indicates a decrease)	Location	Days	Eliminated
1	4 January 2025	'Een Rein Geweten'	€0 → €900	Phnom Penh	1–2	—N/a
2	11 January 2025	'Het Juiste Motief'	€900 → €2,600	Phnom Penh	3–4	Teun
3	18 January 2025	'De Juiste Manier van Zien'	€2,600 → €4,125	Phnom Penh & Siem Reap	5–6	Gabriël
4	25 January 2025	'De Juiste Manier van Praten'	€4,125 → €5,205	Kampong Khleang & Siem Reap	7–8	Ray
5	1 February 2025	'De Juiste Concentratie'	€5,205 → €6,255	Angkor & Siem Reap	9–10	Bridget
6	8 February 2025	'De Juiste Inspanning'	€6,255 → €8,455	Angkor & Siem Reap	11–12	Sam
7	15 February 2025	'De Juiste Oplettendheid'	€8,455 → €3,755	Kampot & Siem Reap	13–14	Nora
8	22 February 2025	'De Juiste Manier van Doen'	€3,755 → €5,255	Kampot	15–16	Sophie
9	1 March 2025	'De Juiste Manier van Leven'	€5,255 → €8,055	Kampot & Phnom Penh	17–18	—N/a
10	8 March 2025	'De Finale'	€8,055	Amsterdam, Netherlands	Runner-up	Maaike
10	8 March 2025	'De Finale'	€8,055	Amsterdam, Netherlands	Winner	Roos
10	8 March 2025	'De Finale'	€8,055	Amsterdam, Netherlands	The Mole	Stijn

== Season summary ==
=== Episode 1 ===
Episode 1 - Een Rein Geweten
Original airdates: 4 January 2025 Location: Phnom Penh
Assignment	Money earned	Possible earnings
Karakteristiek	—N/a	—N/a
Feestje voor de Mol	€900	€3,000
Current Pot	€900	€3,000
Execution
—N/a	Quiz results disregarded	

Karakteristiek

The group attend a Buddhist blessing ceremony where each candidate is given a letter which states that host Rik van de Westelaken will later inform them of whether or not they "have the chance" to earn a Joker.

Rik then whispers to each candidate whether or not they have the chance to win a Joker. The group then have 15 minutes to select five candidates they believe were told that they had the chance to earn a Joker. For each correct candidate selected, they would lose their chance at a Joker. However, it is announced that €1,000 would be lost from the pot for each incorrect candidate nominated.

The group selected Bridget, Nora, Ray, Sam and Teun. It was then revealed that all ten candidates were told that they had the chance to earn a Joker, and as a result, no money was deducted from the pot.

Afterwards, candidates individually enter a temple where they must distribute 12 character attributes to the candidate they believe they best match with. Upon exiting the temple, candidates take a surprise Execution quiz containing only one question: "Who is the Mole?". At the Execution ceremony, it is revealed that no Mole had yet been selected as part of a twist, and therefore no one was eliminated. Additionally, the group had now chosen the Mole themselves based on certain events leading up to this point. The newly-selected Mole is informed of their new role later in the evening.

Feestje voor de Mol

The group split themselves into five pairs, with each pair driven by tuk tuk to two locations around Phnom Penh to gather items for a party such as musicians, cake and balloons. At each location, pairs must complete a challenge in order to receive an item for the party, then bring it undamaged to a boat along the Mekong River. For each item properly delivered to the boat within 45 minutes, €300 is added to the pot.

=== Episode 2 ===
Episode 2 - Het Juiste Motief
Original airdates: 11 January 2025 Location: Phnom Penh
Assignment	Money earned	Possible earnings
Lichaamstaal	€1,100	€2,000
De Zilveren Greep	−€150	€3,000
Kluizenaar	€750	€1,250
Current Pot	€2,600	€9,250
Jokers
Roos, Stijn & Sam (Note: Sam gained physical possession of a Joker in the "Kluizenaar" assignment, however it was labelled as Maaike's and therefore could only be used by her. Sam later gave Maaike this Joker in episode 5.)	Kluizenaar	
Execution
Teun	1st player executed	

Lichaamstaal

Candidates divide themselves into three groups, with each group driven to two locations around Phnom Penh. At each location, the groups select one of three words and capture a panorama of themselves spelling out the chosen word with their bodies. Longer words are worth more money, with the longest word (six letters) at each location worth €250. Once the panorama is taken, the groups send it to a chat for other groups to guess the word. For each correctly guessed word, its monetary value is added to the pot. Additionally, the group can collectively earn a bonus €500 if all ten candidates arrive at the Royal Palace and pose for a panorama, taken by Rik, spelling out "Phnom Penh". There is a 45-minute time-limit for the assignment.

De Zilveren Greep

Eight candidates have 45 minutes to complete a "heist" to "steal" one item each from the Central Market, without being caught by guards to add money to the pot. Candidates are directed via by walkie-talkie by the remaining two candidates who coordinate the heist and are equipped with a map of the market and the values of different items to steal.

The eight candidates attempt to steal an item which does not contain the Mole's fingerprints, and only three candidates can be in the market at once. To determine the correct items, two candidates must simultaneously press buttons at separate locations to activate a blacklight. The blacklight reveals items which contain the Mole's fingerprints. After stealing an item, candidates must take it out the market before the next candidate can enter. Candidates are eliminated from the challenge if they are caught by a guard.

For each item stolen which does not contain the Mole's fingerprint, its value is added to the pot. However, if the item contains the Mole's fingerprint, its value is deducted from the pot instead.

Kluizenaar

The four candidates who were caught by a guard in the previous assignment (Roos, Sam, Stijn and Sophie) spend the night in a vault. The following morning, they are given 45 minutes to solve a series of clues around a restaurant to figure out the combinations to unlock five boxes. Each box contains €250 and a Joker with the name of a candidate who was not nominated to lose their Joker in the "Karakteristiek" assignment of episode 1 (Gabriël, Maaike, Roos, Sophie and Stijn). Each Joker can only be used by the candidate named on it.

For each box unlocked within 45 minutes, €250 is added to the pot and the Joker is given to the candidate listed on it, if they are participating in the assignment. If a Joker belonging to one of the six non-participating candidates is opened, the first candidate there to grab that Joker gets to keep it potentially for leverage in the game, but cannot use it for any quiz themself.

€750 was added to the pot. Roos' and Stijn's Jokers were found, allowing the candidates to claim them. Maaike's Joker was also found, however, as she was not present, it was claimed by Sam who was the first candidate to grab it.

=== Episode 3 ===
Episode 3 - De Juiste Manier van Zien
Original airdates: 18 January 2025 Location: Phnom Penh and Siem Reap
Assignment	Money earned	Possible earnings
Levenslied	€1,025	€5,400
Wie van de Drie?	€0	€1,500
Strikvraag	€500	€1,200
Current Pot	€4,125	€17,350
Jokers
Stijn	Wie van de drie?	
Sam	Strikvraag	
Execution
Gabriël	2nd player executed	

Levenslied

Each candidate is given two secret words. They must select two songs related to these words to sing, so the rest of the group can guess the words. For each correctly guessed word, up to €300 is added to the pot, based on the percentage of how in tune the candidate sang. Candidates cannot perform dance moves or gestures which give clues about the word.

€1,024 was earned for the pot which Rik rounded to €1,025.

Wie van de Drie?

After checking into a new hotel in Siem Reap, the three candidates who select the keycards for certain rooms are secretly escorted to another destination to spend the night instead: a hostel, a luxury hotel, or the defunct Siem Reap International Airport.

The following morning, these three candidates attempt to convince the rest of the group that they were the one who spent the night at Siem Reap International Airport. The rest of the group is given two rounds of questioning, with each person allowed one minute per round to ask questions, before voting on who they believe is lying or telling the truth.

If the rest of the group select the contestant who spent the night at the airport, €1,500 is added to the pot. However, if they are incorrect, the candidate they believed was telling the truth receives two Jokers. Additionally, at the airport is also a tablet with videos of each candidate's reaction when they were told if they were selected as the Mole. If a candidate manages to "smuggle" the tablet during episode 7, where the group return to the airport for an assignment, they may watch these videos.

Ray, Stijn and Sophie were the candidates who spent the night at different locations. The group voted for Stijn as the candidate telling the truth, when it was actually Ray. As a result, no money earned and Stijn received two Jokers.

Strikvraag

All candidates complete the Execution quiz simultaneously. However, upon reaching question 16, the details of the assignment are revealed, and all remaining questions are about the Mole's actions in this assignment. Candidates can search the nearby Wat Bo temple for envelopes containing money for the pot. If a candidate finds €250 individually, they can use it to buy a Joker instead. Also, each candidate can ring a gong to earn €50 each for the pot.

Sam spent €250 to buy a Joker. Notwithstanding his purchase, €500 was earned for the pot overall. The Execution ceremony commenced afterwards.

=== Episode 4 ===
Episode 4 - De Juiste Manier van Praten
Original airdates: 25 January 2025 Location: Kampong Khleang & Siem Reap
Assignment	Money earned	Possible earnings
Tunnelvisie	€250	€3,750
Ijsvrij	€330	Unknown (Note: The possible earnings for the "Ijsvrij" assignment was not shown on screen and is therefore unknown. As a result, this value is not included in the calculations of the season's possible total earnings.)
Versierpoging	€500	€1,000
Current Pot	€5,205	€22,100
Jokers
Sophie	Ijsvrij	
Execution
Ray	3rd player executed	

Tunnelvisie

The group nominate three candidates to later undergo a lie detector test, and two interviewers to ask the questions.

The remaining three candidates each enter a "haunted house" individually. Around the house are five buttons that light up for one minute at different times, and candidates attempt to press as many lit buttons as possible. For each lit button pressed, €250 and one question for the interviewers administering the lie detector test is earned. However, these candidates must move quietly as they are shot at with a laser gun by blindfolded "snipers" each time they make sound, and lose €500 each time they are hit. Afterwards, the interviewers use the earned questions to interrogate the three candidates undergoing the lie detector test.

Ijsvrij

Candidates divide themselves into two groups, each with one captain, who are separated from their groups for the assignment.

Each group must make shaved ice desserts and hand them out to local children. Each dessert handed out earns money for the pot depending on how many colored syrpus it contains. A dessert with one color earns €5 for the pot; two colors earns €10; three colors earns €25; four colors earn €50; five colors earn €100. Each group has one colored syrup to begin with, but their captain can earn them more syrups during their part of the assignment.

Meanwhile, the captains (Sam and Sophie) compete against each other in a game of Snakes and ladders. Each time they land on certain squares, they are asked a trivia question, and their group receives an additional colored syrup if they answer correctly. Additionally, only the money earned by the group of the winning captain is added to the pot, and that captain also receives a Joker if their group made more money than the other group during the assignment. While not explicitly announced, the time that the Snakes and ladders game takes was also the time-limit for the assignment.

Sophie defeated Sam in the Snakes and ladders game, meaning the €330 her group earned was added to the pot. As this total was also higher than the money earned by Sam's group, Sophie also received a Joker.

Versierpoging

Candidates enter a house two at a time to take the Execution quiz. Their time begins once they enter, however they must obtain the laptops to take the quiz on.

To do so, each pair must add four items (a cake, candles, a party hat and a gift) to an incomplete standstill birthday party scene. If they are successful within three minutes, €250 is added to the pot and the partygoers present them with the laptops so they can commence the quiz immediately, potentially improving their overall time. Pairs who fail to complete the task in time earn no money and only receive the laptops at the end of the three minutes.

=== Episode 5 ===
Episode 5 - De Juiste Concentratie
Original airdates: 1 February 2025 Location: Angkor & Siem Reap
Assignment	Money earned	Possible earnings
Onhandige Gebaren	€750	€4,000
Dat Snijdt Geen Hout	€300	€2,500
Current Pot	€6,255	€28,600
Execution
Bridget	4th player executed	

Onhandige Gebaren

Candidates board one of seven scooters to be driven to their location for the assignment. Unbeknownst to candidates, the scooter they choose also determine their groups.

The four candidates who select a motorcycle containing a notebook are taken to four temples around Angkor. At each temple, they have the option to be shown one, two, or three Apsara dance moves which they must note down. They then face a challenge at the temple to earn money for the pot. The challenge's difficulty and reward depend on the number of moves they choose to see: one move is the easiest and earns €100; two moves earn €250; three moves is the most difficult and earns €500.

Meanwhile, the remaining three candidates attend a lesson to learn 15 Apsara dance moves, some of which they must later perform at a theater. The number of moves they must perform is equal to the number of moves the four candidates chose to study at the temples. If they perform all the moves to the satisfaction of a judge, €2,000 is added to the pot. If any moves are incorrect, the four non-performing candidates have the chance to salvage €500 by identifying which moves were incorrectly performed.

Dat Snijdt Geen Hout

After a tutorial, each candidate must carve a Buddha head out of wood within two hours, which are later scored by an expert. If the average score among the group is 7.5 or higher out of 10, €1,500 is added to the pot.

While awaiting the scores together, each candidate wears headphones. Rik then virtually briefs the Mole about the next part of the assignment, which all candidates can hear through their headphones, although the part of the briefing containing the correct answers cuts out for everyone except the Mole. Afterward, the group receives envelopes with their scores. The candidate with the highest score has €700 in their envelope, while the second-highest scorer has €300. The group must nominate two candidates to open their envelopes to learn their score, and any revealed money is added to the pot.

=== Episode 6 ===
Episode 6 - De Juiste Inspanning
Original airdates: 8 February 2025 Location: Angkor & Siem Reap
Assignment	Money earned	Possible earnings
Gesnapt	€2,000	€2,000
Wat Niet Weet - Wat Niet Deert	€200	€1,300
Current Pot	€8,455	€31,900
Execution
Sam	5th player executed	

Gesnapt

The group are informed that they were secretly photographed by one of eight photographers while at a café. If the group determine the correct photographer by the end of 45 minutes, €2,000 is earned for the pot.

To do so, candidates divide themselves into three pairs. Each pair receive selfies of tourists around Angkor Wat and attempt to locate them to collect clues about the photographer's attire. The clues are written in Khmer, which pairs can translate by asking the general public.

Wat Niet Weet - Wat Niet Deert

The group is split into three pairs. One member is assigned to provide answers to trivia about past Wie is de Mol? seasons, while their partner is taken to the "Mole-centre."

If a candidate assigned to respond does not know the answer to a question, they can secretly press a button to request the answer from their teammate via earpiece. If the teammate at the Mole-centre also doesn't know, they can consult a group of fans (Molloten) for the answer before passing it on. For each question pairs correctly answer without the help of fans, €100 is added to the pot. After each answer, the other two answering contestants guess whether the respondent requested for help. A correct guess earns their team a point. The pair with the fewest points is eliminated after the first round. In the second round, the pair with the most points wins a mystery prize.

€200 was earned for the pot. Roos and Sam won the mystery prize, which was revealed to be information about the tablet for the upcoming "Emotionele Bagage" assignment in the next episode.

=== Episode 7 ===
Episode 7 - De Juiste Oplettendheid
Original airdates: 15 February 2025 Location: Kampot & Siem Reap
Assignment	Money earned	Possible earnings
Emotionele Bagage	€300	€2,250
Trust Nobody	−€5,000	—N/a
Current Pot	€3,755	€34,150
Exemption
Stijn	Trust Nobody (for episode 8)	
Execution
Nora	6th player executed	

Emotionele Bagage

To begin, the group complete a "laser game" at a facility of the defunct Siem Reap International Airport and attempt to collect ten items without being shot by patrolling guards. The group have ten lives, but lose one life each time a candidate is shot, and only two candidates can enter the facility at once. Candidates can also shoot guards to deactivate them for 10 seconds.

After collecting all the items or losing all ten lives, the group proceed to the airport's baggage carousel where the items they retrieved, along with other luggage items, are located. Around the baggage carousel are 15 mannequins holding "passports" which play audio clues about which luggage items belong to them. They must then find the items on the carousel and assign them to the correct mannequin based on these clues. Each mannequin with the correct luggage adds €150 to the pot. To end the assignment, the group must find their own suitcase on the baggage carousel and exit the airport with them. There is a 60 minute time-limit for the assignment overall.

Additionally, a candidate aware of the secret part of the assignment can a find a tablet containing videos of each candidates reaction after being told if they were selected as the Mole in a certain suitcase. If this candidate manages to sneak the tablet into their own suitcase and exit the airport with it, they can later watch these videos.

Trust Nobody

Candidates privately bid for a "Final Exemption" – an Exemption for the next episode which guarantees them a place in the finale, provided they survive this episode's elimination. After the bidding, it is announced that the Exemption would not necessarily be won by the candidate with the highest bid.

To determine who receives the Exemption, candidates stand in a circle blindfolded. One candidate at a time is selected to place the Exemption in front of another candidate. After everyone removes their blindfolds, the candidate with the Exemption tries to guess who placed it there. A correct guess eliminates that person from the assignment, while an incorrect guess results in their own elimination.

Once three candidates are eliminated, they select one of the two candidates still in contention to look inside two boxes, one of which contains the Exemption. That candidate then assigns a box to themselves and the other box to their opponent. Their opponent may then decide whether to keep or swap the boxes before they are opened. The candidate who opens the box with the Exemption wins it and the money they bid earlier is deducted from the pot.

Stijn won the Exemption, and therefore the €5,000 he bid was deducted from the pot.

=== Episode 8 ===
Episode 8 - De Juiste Manier van Doen
Original airdates: 22 February 2025 Location: Kampot
Assignment	Money earned	Possible earnings
Bekokstoven	€0	€2,000
I See You...	€1,500	€3,000
Zout in de Wonden Strooien	€0	€5,000
Current Pot	€5,255	€44,150
Jokers
Maaike	Zout in de Wonden Strooien	
Execution
Sophie	7th player executed	

Bekokstoven

The group compete against a "kitchen princess" to cook the better fish amok, judged by three chefs. If one chef prefers the group's dish over the kitchen princess', €1,000 is added to the pot. If two or more chefs prefer the group's dish, €2,000 is added to the pot.

One candidate watches a chef prepare fish amok and they must communicate the instructions by phone to two other candidates in a kitchen so they can prepare the dish. Meanwhile, the fourth candidate attempts to complete several challenges to impose disadvantages on the kitchen princess, such as requiring her to temporarily be blindfolded.

I See You...

Candidates check into a hotel to spend the night. There, they are informed that their rooms, which cost KHR 200,000 each, have not yet been paid for.

In several rooms around the dimly-lit hotel are safes containing Cambodian riel notes which candidates try to unlock and collect the money to pay for their rooms. Candidates can determine the room and combination of safes by listening to clues from "ghosts" around the hotel. During the mission, candidates also attempt to avoid being seen by "chambermaids". Each time a candidate is seen by a chambermaid, the price of their individual room increases by KHR 40,000. By midnight, €750 is added to the pot for each room able to be paid for with the collected riel.

Zout in de Wonden Strooien

Candidates attempt to harvest as much salt as possible from a salt field within 45 minutes (up to 500 kilograms) to earn up to €5,000 for the pot. After collecting 125 kilograms of salt, a cage opens and one candidate may approach the cage and either take the money inside for the pot or open a mystery envelope. Inside each mystery envelope is a note stating that the last candidate to open a mystery envelope receives two Jokers. After making a decision, that candidate can no longer help harvest salt.

No money was earned for the pot. Maaike was the last candidate to open a mystery envelope and received two Jokers.

=== Episode 9 ===
Episode 9 - De Juiste Manier van Leven
Original airdates: 1 March 2025 Location: Kampot & Phnom Penh
Assignment	Money earned	Possible earnings
Kampootjes van de Vloer	€1,300	€2,750
Keuzestress	€1,500	€2,100
Final Pot	€8,055	€49,000

Kampootjes van de Vloer

The group have 30 minutes to buy 11 listed souvenir items from a market without touching the ground. Each souvenir bought adds €250 to the pot, however, €50 is removed each time a candidate or souvenir touches the ground.

Keuzestress

Each candidate has 30 minutes to individually collect paper boats from the water using a bamboo fishing pole. Each paper boat contains one third of a circle of a certain color. Once a candidate collects three thirds of the same color to form a circle, €300 is added to the pot.

After forming each circle, candidates can also select a video of an eliminated contestant's decisions in the "Karakteristiek" assignment of episode 1, and their pre-season interview, to later watch. The decisions in these events were used to determine the Mole. Each eliminated contestant's video can only be claimed by one candidate.

€1,500 was earned for the pot, bringing the final pot to €8,055.

=== Episode 10 (Finale) ===
Episode 10 - De Finale
Original airdates: 8 March 2025
Location: Amsterdam, Netherlands
Runner-up
Maaike
Winner
Roos
The Mole
Stijn

The live finale was held at De Hallen in Amsterdam, Netherlands.

Stijn was revealed as the Mole, Maaike finished as the runner-up and Roos was declared the winner of the season.

== Mole selection ==
In a series first, the candidates (unknowingly) determined the Mole themselves based on the outcomes of their pre-season interviews and the "Karakteristiek" assignment of episode 1. The method in which the Mole was chosen was revealed in the finale.

During their application/pre-season interviews, all ten contestants indicated they wanted to be selected as the Mole. During these interviews, the candidates had to select three characteristics they believe a perfect Mole should have. The three most selected traits were creative, ruthless and social.

In the "Karakteristiek" assignment of episode 1, contestants had to distribute 12 characteristics to the candidate they believe they best match with. The contestants that received creative, ruthless or social the most times were Maaike and Stijn. Afterwards, contestants took a surprise Execution quiz containing only one question: "Who is the Mole?". Stijn was not selected in the quiz while Maaike was selected twice. As a result, Stijn had been chosen as the Mole.

== Mole activity ==
As the Mole, Stijn was briefed about the assignments by production. The following acts of sabotage or Mole activity were revealed.

Episode 1

- In the "Feestje voor de Mol" assignment, one of Sam and Stijn's challenges was to play a game of beer pong to obtain beer for the party. Stijn purposefully threw the balls inaccurately to ensure the challenge was not completed in time.

Episode 2

- Before the "De Zilveren Greep" assignment, Stijn put his fingerprints on various items, using blacklight paint, which candidates had to later avoid picking up. During the assignment, Stijn suggested for Bridget to take the dragon, which he knew contained his fingerprints. Additionally, Stijn did not press a button to activate the blacklight when requested to, leading to Roos not being able to identify an item to take and subsequently getting caught by a guard. Stijn later was also caught by a guard.
- In the "Kluizenaar" assignment, Roos' and Stijn's boxes were the first to be opened, earning them a Joker and €250 for the pot each. At this point, Roos suggested to Stijn to not help open more boxes so other candidates would not receive a Joker, which Stijn agreed to. The two of them also hindered the progress of solving the clues by hiding items and misleading the others.

Episode 3

- Before the "Levenslied" assignment, Stijn noticed he had residual blacklight paint on his hands from the previous episode. As the karaoke bar where the assignment took place contained various blacklights, Stijn thoroughly washed his fingers before the assignment to avoid the black paint being noticed.
- For the "Wie van de Drie?" assignment, Stijn selected a keycard which required him to sleep at a hostel and later lie that he slept at Siem Reap International Airport to try and win two Jokers. Stijn spent his entire evening preparing his responses and researching information about the airport.

Episode 4

- Before the "Tunnelvisie" assignment, Stijn practised giving his response to potential questions to try and have the lie detector not detect his lies. For the assignment however, he was selected as one of the candidates to enter the "haunted" house. There, he wore pants with chains which made noise when he moved, and allowed himself to get shot three times.

Episode 5

- In the "Onhandige Gebaren" assignment, Stijn encouraged his group to undergo the more difficult challenges, which would later make the assignment harder. One of his group's challenges was to hold a one-legged yoga pose for three minutes. Stijn fell off balance immediately but no one noticed as he was standing at the back, and Sophie took the blame for the challenge's failure after she later lost balance. Another one of his group's challenges was to recreate a photograph of Angelina Jolie at Ta Phrom temple during the film Lara Croft: Tomb Raider. Despite being a photographer, Stijn captured the photo which contained two critical errors and was therefore unsuccessful. Later, after Bridget and Maaike performed two incorrect Apsara dance moves, Stijn mislead his group from identifying the misperformed moves, meaning no money was salvaged.
- In the "Dat Snijdt Geen Hout" assignment, Stijn carved his Buddha head in an abrupt and reckless manner, diminishing its quality and therefore lowering his (and by extension the group average) score. Stijn was then briefed that Maaike and Roos had the two highest scores. After the group nominated Sophie as one of the two top-scoring candidates, a vote was held to nominate the second candidate. After the majority already voted Maaike, Stijn voted for Roos (who had the highest score and most money) to seem trustworthy.

Episode 6

- After the "Wat Niet Weet - Wat Niet Deert" assignment, Stijn discretely placed the envelope with information about the next assignment next to Roos and Sam while they were getting massaged.

Episode 7

- In the "Emotionele Bagage" assignment, Stijn removed the audio chips from several passports so they would no longer play clues once opened.
- In the "Trust Nobody" assignment, Stijn was told of everyone's bids. Each round, Stijn could secretly choose which candidate was selected to place the Exemption in front of another candidate. He targeted candidates with lower bids (Maaike and Nora) to try and eliminate them, therefore ensuring a higher amount of money would be removed from the pot from higher bids.

Episode 8

- In the "I See You..." assignment, Stijn knew the combinations of each safe beforehand. After collecting some of the money from safes so other candidates could not later retrieve it, Stijn disposed of the money by various means including tearing it up and flushing it down the toilet.

== Hidden clues ==
The following clues were revealed on the show's website.

Recurring clues

- The titles of the first eight episodes refer to the Noble Eightfold Path of Buddhism. The path leads to enlightenment, the highest state of holiness. Stijn's name is derived from the name Augustijn (Augustine), which means sanctified, exalted or venerable.
- Stijn's occupation is a photographer which was referenced in some assignments in the season. In episode 5, one of the challenges in the "Onhandige Gebaren" assignment was to recreate a photograph of Angelina Jolie during the film Lara Croft: Tomb Raider. In episode 6, the "Gesnapt" assignment required the group to figure out which photographer took a picture of them.

Episode 2

- For the Mole briefing, Rik is shown talking to the Mole at room 928 of the hotel. Adding these digits together gives the number 19; the 19th letter of the alphabet is S, a reference to Stijn's name.
- In the "Kluizenaar" assignment, the restaurant had four paintings of candidates labelled with the years 1984, 1987, 1991 and 1998. These numbers gave a clue to the Mole.
  - 1991: The digits in the year add up to 20. The 20th question in the Execution quiz asks "Who is the Mole?"
  - 1987: The digits in the year add up to 25. This is the 25th season of Wie is de Mol?.
  - 1984: The numbers 19 and 84 add up to 103. When rotated upside down and with the 3 further rotated sideways, the result resembles the word "Mol."
  - 1998: 1998 is Stijn's birth year, and only his painting matches the labeled year.

Episode 3

- In the "Levenslied" assignment, Stijn selected an envelope with the word bedrieger (cheater). He chose to sing the song "Little Lies" to communicate the word. Additionally, while Stijn performed the song in a humorous manner, Rik holds the opened envelope with the show's logo containing "De Mol" over his face, seemingly to hide his laughter.

Episode 4

- Stijn's last name is de Vries which translates to "the freeze," and two of the episode's assignments were related to frozen things. In the "Ijsvrij" assignment, candidates had to make shaved ice desserts. In the "Versierpoging" assignment, the party scene was "frozen in time" until candidates completed it or three minutes had elapsed.

Episode 5

- During the "Onhandige Gebaren" assignment, Stijn was talking about his Mole tactics to the camera while being driven to a temple (not shown during the episode), within earshot of his driver. Later, the scooter drivers were shown having a conversation and Stijn's driver mentions that he heard the Mole was doing well.

Episode 7

- One of the items retrieved in the "Emotionele Bagage" assignment was a suitcase belonging to "L. Somsi". The letters can be rearranged to spell "Mol is S.", a reference to Stijn's name.

== Reception ==
=== Viewing figures ===
Viewing Figures
#	Title	Air Date	Time Slot	Average	Total	Weekly rank
1	Een Rein Geweten	January 4, 2025	Saturday 20.30 CET	3,476,000	4,095,000	1
2	Het Juiste Motief	January 11, 2025	Saturday 20.30 CET	3,164,000	3,725,000	1
3	De Juiste Manier van Zien	January 18, 2025	Saturday 20.30 CET	3,068,000	3,446,000	1
4	De Juiste Manier van Praten	January 25, 2025	Saturday 20.30 CET	3,177,000	3,448,000	1
5	De Juiste Concentratie	February 1, 2025	Saturday 20.30 CET	3,075,000	3,486,000	1
6	De Juiste Inspanning	February 8, 2025	Saturday 20.30 CET	3,090,000	3,560,000	1
7	De Juiste Oplettendheid	February 15, 2025	Saturday 20.30 CET	3,008,000	3,462,000	1
8	De Juiste Manier van Doen	February 22, 2025	Saturday 20.30 CET	2,933,000	3,309,000	1
9	De Juiste Manier van Leven	March 1, 2025	Saturday 20.30 CET	2,929,000	3,407,000	1
10	De Finale	March 8, 2025	Saturday 20.30 CET	2,087,000	3,454,000	1
