= Rik van de Westelaken =

Dutch television presenter (born 1971)

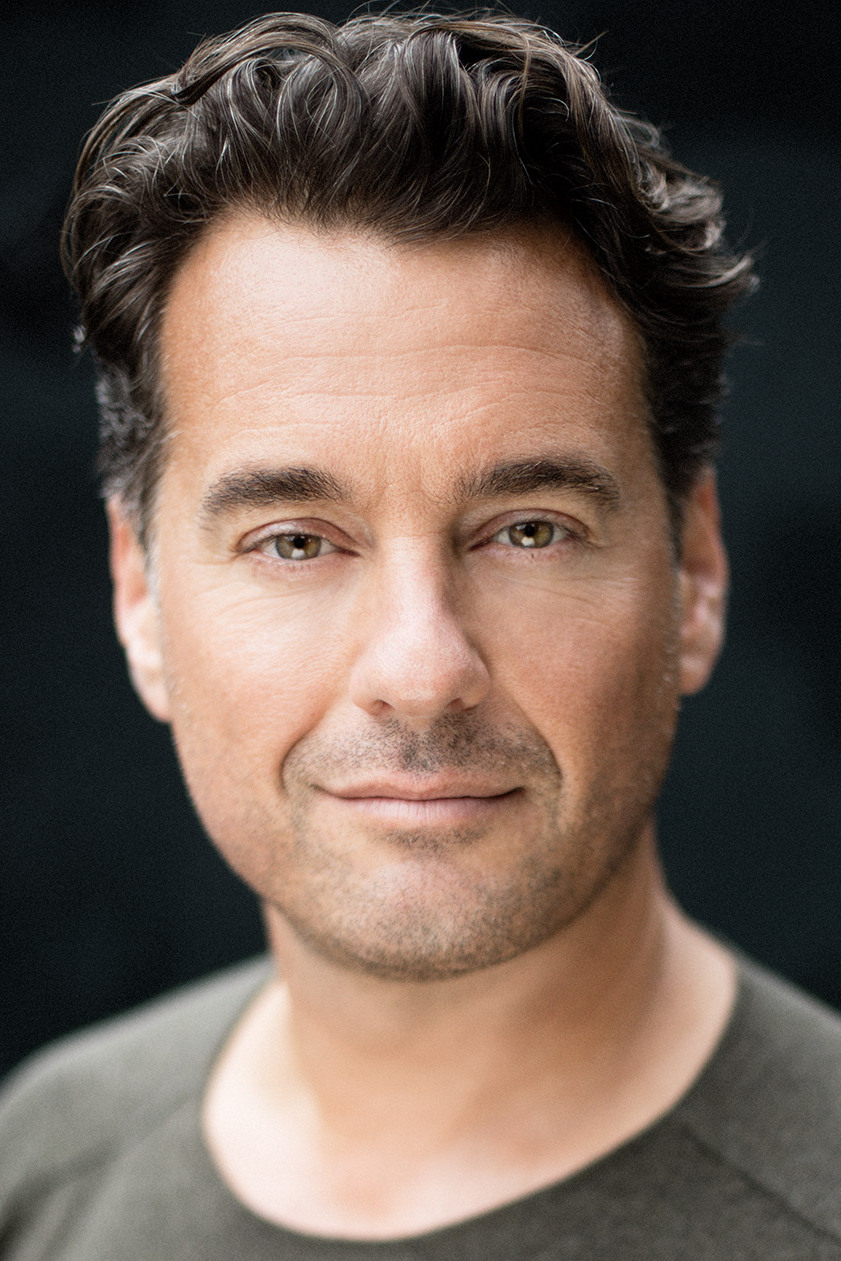
- Born: 22 April 1971 (age 55); Vlaardingen, Netherlands
- Occupation: Television presenter
- Known for: NOS Journaal; EenVandaag; Wie is de Mol?

Rik van de Westelaken (born 22 April 1971) is a Dutch television presenter. He is known for presenting television programs which include the NOS Journaal, EenVandaag, Peking Express and Wie is de Mol?. Other programs include the travel show Rik over de grens and the quiz show 5 Golden Rings.

== Career ==
In 1995 he started his career in journalism at AT5, the TV-station of Amsterdam. Between 1999–2016 he was one of the presenters of the NOS Journaal. He switched from NOS to work for the channel Net5 in 2016. He presented the first season of the quiz show 5 Golden Rings in 2017. In the same year, Van de Westelaken and Sean Dhondt presented a season of the show Peking Express in which contestants traveled from Ha Long Bay, Vietnam to Angkor Wat, Cambodia.

He appeared as news presenter in the 2008 film Summer Heat and as himself in the films Spion van Oranje (2009), Zomer zonder mama (2019), Alles op tafel (2021), Captain Nova (2021), De Grote Kerstfilm (2023) and the VPRO-tv series Techbitch (2025).

As of 2018, he presents the current affairs television programme EenVandaag.

In 2019, he succeeded Art Rooijakkers as presenter of the popular television show Wie is de Mol?. Van de Westelaken participated as contestant in the show in 2015 and he ended up winning the show. A year later, he presented Moltalk, the aftershow of Wie is de Mol?, together with Vivienne van den Assem. In 2020, he presented both the 20th season of Wie is de Mol? and a special anniversary season called Wie is de Mol? Renaissance which celebrates the 20th anniversary of the show. In the same year, Van de Westelaken and Merel Westrik competed as duo in a 2020 episode of the quiz show Deze quiz is voor jou.

In 2021, he presented the 21st season of the show, which is his fourth season as host. He also presented the 22nd season, 23rd season and 24th season of the show. In 2025, he presented the 25th season and he also presented an anniversary season of the show.

For AvroTros he also presented several editions of the Canal Parade in Amsterdam (2018-2022), the Award show Televizierring (2018 - 2022) and De Voorbeschouwing (2020 - 2024).

Van de Westelaken has been a member of various literary prize panels: de Gouden Strop (2012), head of the jury for the Woutertje Pieterse Prijs (2024, 2025 and 2026), an annual award for children's literature. He has also been the head of the jury for het Boekenweekgeschenk 2025. Since 2012, he has also narrated dozens of audiobooks. In 2022, he was rewarded the Storytel Award for best narrator. In 2025, he was part of the Dutch voice-cast for Zootopia.

== Selected filmography ==
=== As presenter ===
- 5 Golden Rings (2017)
- Peking Express (2017)
- Rik over de grens (2017)
- Wie is de Mol? (2019 – present)

=== As contestant ===
- Wie is de Mol? (2015)
- Deze quiz is voor jou (2020)
