= Marc-Marie Huijbregts =

Dutch comedian, actor and television presenter

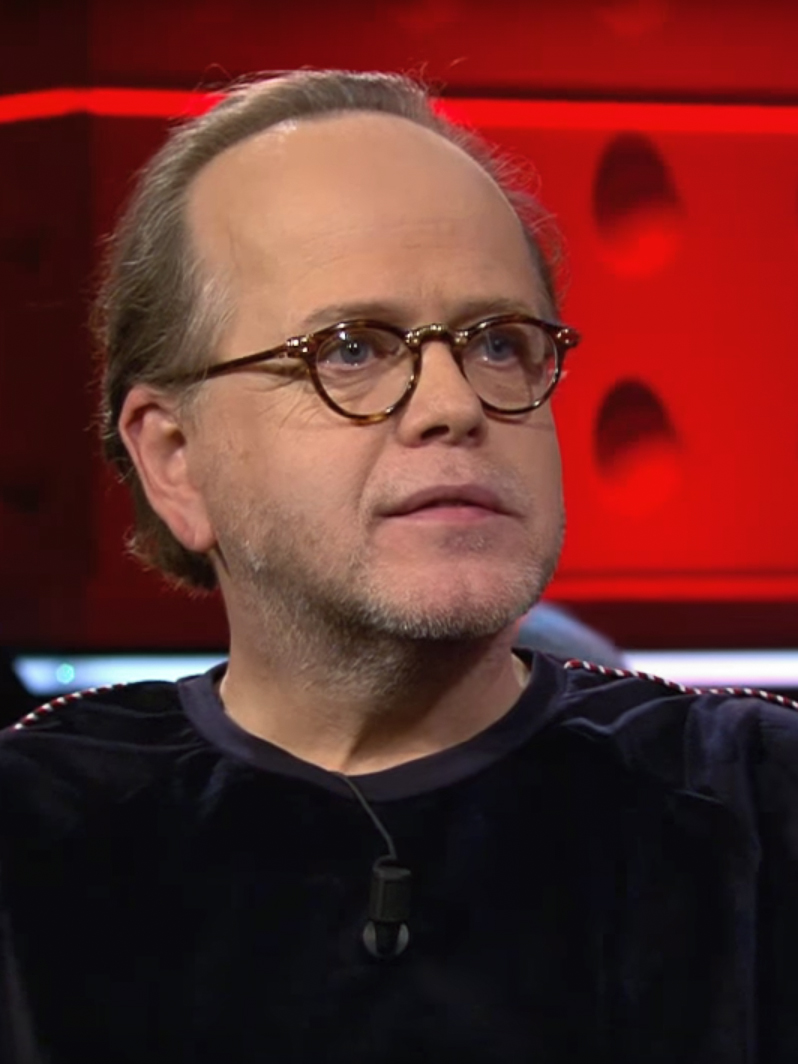
- Marc-Marie Huijbregts (2017)
- Born: 21 December 1964 (age 61); Tilburg, Netherlands
- Known for: De Wereld Draait Door; De Slimste Mens ter Wereld; 't Schaep met de 5 pooten

Marc-Marie Huijbregts (born 21 December 1964) is a Dutch comedian, actor and television presenter. He is known for his cabaret shows and as co-host of the television show De Wereld Draait Door. He is also known as jury member in the Flemish quiz show De Slimste Mens ter Wereld.

== Career ==
Huijbregts appeared in various roles in the television series In de Vlaamsche pot (1990), We zijn weer thuis (1991 – 1994), Baantjer (1997) and Goede tijden, slechte tijden (1997). In 2000, he appeared as team captain in the satirical television show Dit was het nieuws.

Huijbregts won the 2005 edition of the popular television show Wie is de Mol? by correctly identifying Yvon Jaspers as the mole. From 2003 till 2010, he played the role of Sorrypiet in Het Sinterklaasjournaal.

In 2006 and 2007, he played the role of Lukas Blijdtschap in the remake of 't Schaep met de 5 pooten. He reprised this role in the sequels 't Vrije Schaep (2009), 't Spaanse Schaep (2010 and 2011), 't Schaep in Mokum (2013) and 't Schaep Ahoy (2015). In 2007, he appeared in the film Love is All. The film became one of the most visited Dutch films of all time; the film received the Golden Film, Platinum Film and Diamond Film awards for box office success.

In 2010 and 2011, he was one of the judges in season three of the singing competition series Popstars. In 2010, he also presented De Zaterdagavondshow met Marc-Marie & Beau ('The Saturday Night Show with Marc-Marie & Beau') with Beau van Erven Dorens which wasn't very successful and only four episodes were broadcast. In 2017, he played the character Jaap Mengelmoes in the Flemish television series Samson en Gert. In 2018, he held the oudejaarsconference of that year titled Onderweg Naar Morgen.

In 2021, he appeared in the television series The Masked Singer. Since 2022, he appears as judge in the television series Holland's Got Talent. He appeared in an episode of the 2025 anniversary season of the television show Wie is de Mol?.

== Filmography ==
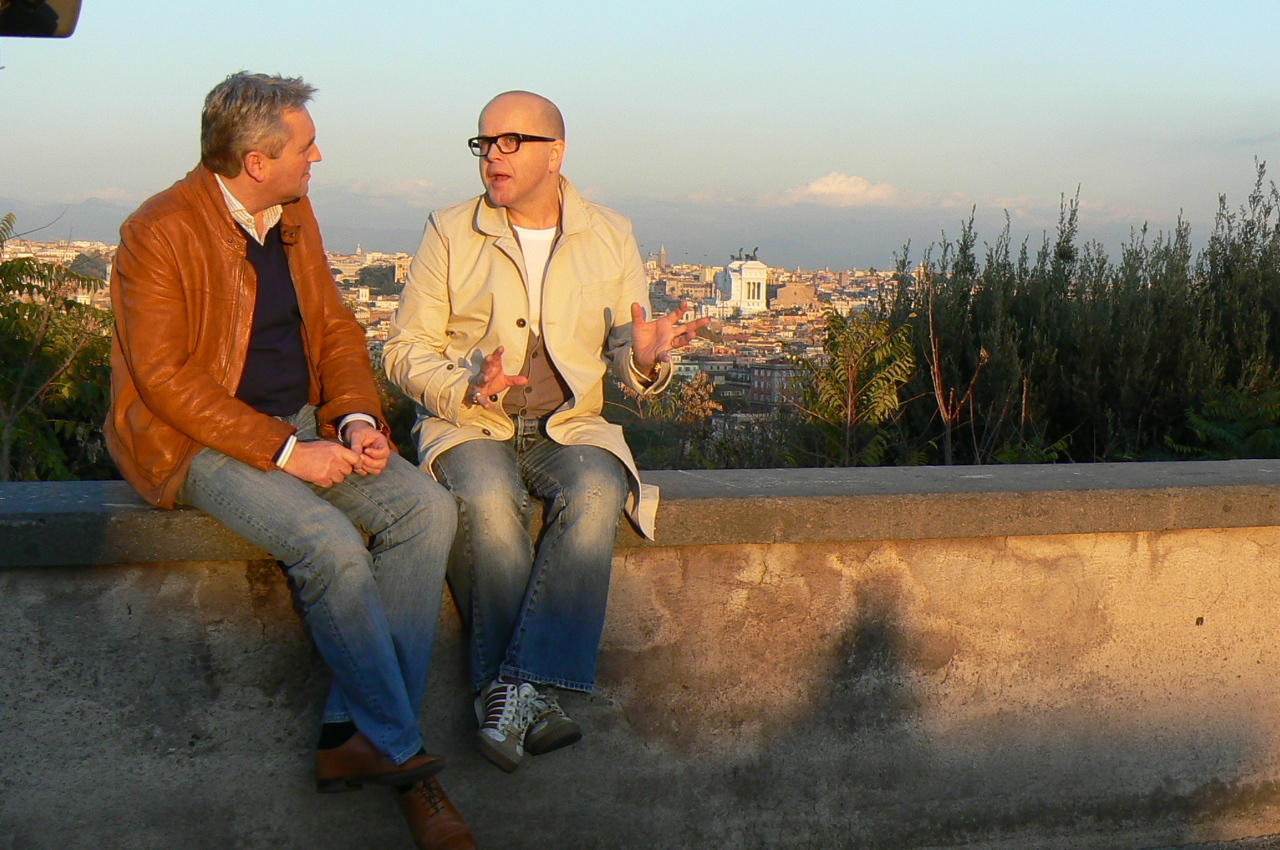
Wilfred Kemp and Marc-Marie Huijbregts in Rome (2010).

=== As actor ===
- In de Vlaamsche pot (1990)
- We zijn weer thuis (1991 – 1994)
- Baantjer (1997)
- Goede tijden, slechte tijden (1997)
- Het Sinterklaasjournaal (2003 – 2010)
- 't Schaep met de 5 pooten (2006, 2007)
- Love is All (2007)
- 't Vrije Schaep (2009)
- 't Spaanse Schaep (2010 and 2011)
- 't Schaep in Mokum (2013)
- Welkom bij de Romeinen (2014)
- 't Schaep Ahoy (2015)
- Kasper en de Kerstengelen (2015)
- Samson en Gert (2017)

=== As voice actor ===
- Princess Sissi (1997)
- Tow Truck Pluck (2004)

=== As presenter ===
- De Zaterdagavondshow met Marc-Marie & Beau (2010)

=== As judge ===
- Holland's Got Talent (2022 – present)

=== As contestant ===
- De Verraders (2026, Flemish version, Belgian television)
