= Yvon Jaspers =

Dutch television presenter

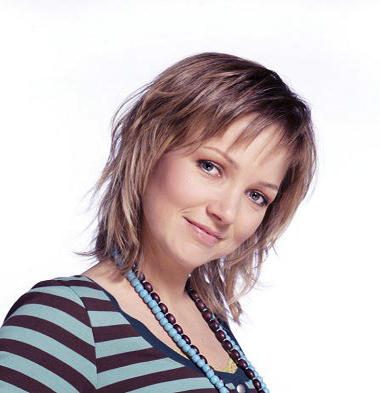
- Jaspers in 2007
- Born: 20 March 1973 (age 53); Boxtel, Netherlands
- Occupation: Television presenter
- Known for: Boer zoekt Vrouw

Yvon Jaspers (Dutch pronunciation: [iˌvɔˈɲɑspərs]; born 20 March 1973) is a Dutch television presenter and actress. She is known as presenter of Boer zoekt Vrouw, the Dutch version of Farmer Wants a Wife, and as presenter of Het Klokhuis.

== Career ==
As actress, Jaspers is known for her role as Robin Theysse in the television series Rozengeur & Wodka Lime. She also played the role of the mother of Knofje in the children's television series Knofje. Jaspers was also one of the presenters of the children's television show ZigZag. In 2012, she published the children's book Ties en Trijntje with illustrations by Philip Hopman.

Jaspers and Johan Terryn presented the popular science television show Groot Licht. The show won multiple awards, including in 2000 the Prix Jeunesse for non-fiction television for children between ages six and eleven. She was the mole in the 2005 edition of the television show Wie is de Mol?. Marc-Marie Huijbregts won that edition of the show by correctly identifying her as the mole.

Jaspers presented the television show Wonderen bestaan about people who have experienced a miracle. Since 2018, she presents the show Onze boerderij about farming. She also presented Onze boerderij in Europa in which she traveled to farms in Europe with farming couples from the show Boer zoekt Vrouw. She created a documentary about Parkinson's disease after her brother was diagnosed with the disease. The documentary De boer, de broer, de zus en de ziekte aired in 2026.

Jaspers was a contestant in the 2023 season of the show Het Jachtseizoen. She stayed in a monastery for three days for a 2026 episode of the show Kloostergasten.

== Personal life ==
In 2024, Jaspers was decorated Knight in the Order of Orange-Nassau. She is an ambassador for the Ronald McDonald Kinderfonds.
