= Airen Mylene =

Dutch television presenter

- Born: 22 August 1985 (age 40); Utrecht, Netherlands
- Occupation: Dutch Television Presenter at SBS6
- Years active: 2011 - Present

Airen Mylene Tjon-A-Tsien (born Utrecht, 22 August 1985) is a Dutch presenter of Suriname descent.

Between July and December 2020, Mylene was the temporary news presenter at the Radio 538 Coen en Sander Show. She replaced news presenter Jo van Egmond during her vacation and maternity leave.

Mylene and Jan Versteegh presented the shows Alle Remmen Los! and Red Bull Stalen Ros in 2025. The show Alle Remmen Los! was filmed at Speedway Emmen in Emmen, Netherlands and contestants compete against each other by driving backwards or by driving with a caravan. In Red Bull Stalen Ros the contestants need to complete a course over water with a decorated bicycle (similar to the television show Te land, ter zee en in de lucht).

== Television ==
Presenteerwerk
Year	Programm	Channel	Note
2011	ScienceFlash	NTR	
2011–2012	The Voice of Holland	YouTube	V-Reporter
2013-heden	Shownieuws	SBS6	
2014–2015	Surprise Surprise	SBS6	Together with Do and Henny Huisman
2015-heden	De 25	SBS6	
2015	Het Beste Idee van Nederland	SBS6	Together with Jochem van Gelder
2016–2017	vtwonen verbouwen of verhuizen	NET 5	
2016	Top 500 van het foute uur	NET 5	1 show programm
2016	SBS6 Sterren Surprise	SBS6	1 show programm
2017	Hart in Aktie	SBS 6	2 seasons
2017	Huizenjacht	SBS 6	
2018–2019	Beestengeluk	SBS6	Together with Piet Hellemans
2018	Vt Wonen Zelf aan de Slag	SBS6	
2018–2020	Lachen om Homevideo's	SBS6	
2018	House Rules NL	NET 5	
2019	Hotel Rules	NET 5	
2019-heden	Hart van Nederland	SBS6	
