= Jeroen Kijk in de Vegte =

Dutch presenter and voice actor

- Born: 14 June 1974 (age 52); Emmeloord, Netherlands
- Occupations: Television presenter; Radio DJ; Voice actor

Jeroen Kijk in de Vegte (born 14 June 1974) is a Dutch television presenter, radio DJ and voice actor. He was one of the sidekicks in the radio show ruuddewild.nl presented by Ruud de Wild. He is the voice over in the shows RTL Boulevard and B&B Vol Liefde. He was also the voice over for Eigen Huis & Tuin.

== Career ==
He was the voice over for Eigen Huis & Tuin from 1996 to 2020. In 2003, he presented the television show Veronica Vibes which was not very successful. He presented Het Beste Idee van Nederland in 2004, a television show in which contestants present their inventions to a jury. He won the first season of the quiz show De slimste mens in 2006.

In 2017, he participated in the 17th season of the popular television show Wie is de Mol?. In 2020, he appeared in a special anniversary edition of the show, called Wie is de Mol? Renaissance, which featured only contestants of previous seasons. He was the titular Mol of that season.

Since July 2018, he is the co-host of the morning show Jan-Willem Start Op! on national public broadcaster NPO Radio 2 and since August 2008 he is the main voice-over for RTL Boulevard, a daily entertainment news show, on RTL 4. Kijk in de Vegte is also the voice over for the shows B&B Vol Liefde and Winter Vol Liefde.

In 2021, Jan-Willem Roodbeen and Kijk in de Vegte won the Gouden RadioRing 2020 for their morning radio show Jan-Willem Start Op!. In 2022, he was a contestant in an episode of the quiz show The Connection presented by Matthijs van Nieuwkerk. He appeared in the quiz alongside two other moles of Wie is de Mol?: Anne-Marie Jung and Jan Versteegh. Since 2022, Kijk in de Vegte and Jan-Willem Roodbeen present De Nationale Popquiz, a quiz show with questions about music.

He played the role of Melchior in the 2023 film De Grote Kerstfilm: Het Verhaal van Driekoningen. It was his acting debut.

Kijk in de Vegte won the Voice Over Award in 2025. He is the first recipient of this award.

In 2026, he was a guest in an episode of the television show Dit was het nieuws. Since May 2026, Kijk in de Vegte and Jan-Willem Roodbeen present the television show Jan-Willem Ruimt Op!. Kijk in de Vegte and Henry Schut were the commentators for the Netherlands for the Eurovision Song Contest 2026 held in Vienna, Austria.

== Personal life ==
On 6 May 2002, he witnessed the assassination of Pim Fortuyn in Hilversum, North Holland which took place in a car park outside the radio studio where Fortuyn had just given an interview to Kijk in de Vegte and his colleague Ruud de Wild.

== Awards ==
- Voice Over Award (2025)

== Selected filmography ==
=== As presenter ===
- 2003: Veronica Vibes
- 2004: Het Beste Idee van Nederland
- 2022 – present: De Nationale Popquiz
- 2026 – present: Jan-Willem Ruimt Op!

=== As voice over ===
- Eigen Huis & Tuin
- RTL Boulevard
- B & B Vol Liefde

=== As actor ===
- 2023: De Grote Kerstfilm: Het Verhaal van Driekoningen

=== As contestant ===
- 2006: De slimste mens
- 2017: Wie is de Mol?
- 2020: Wie is de Mol? Renaissance (anniversary season)
- 2022: The Connection

=== As himself ===
- 2026: Dit was het nieuws
