= Tom Blom =

Dutch television and radio presenter

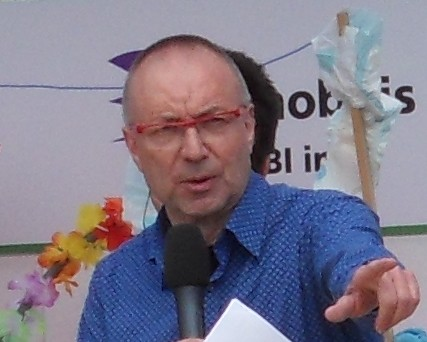
- Blom in April 2011
- Born: 25 September 1946; The Hague, Netherlands
- Died: 3 July 2017 (aged 70) 's-Hertogenbosch, Netherlands
- Occupations: Announcer and presenter
- Years active: 1975-2017
- Known for: Ter land, ter zee en in de lucht Langs de Lijn

Tom Blom (25 September 1946 – 3 July 2017) was a Dutch television and radio presenter.

== Career ==
In 1975, Blom made his television debut as an announcer at The Johnny Kraaijkamp Show. Later, he was a presenter of the record program De Eerste de Beste (together with Walter Tiemessen). From 1983, Blom was a commentator and co-presenter at Te land, ter zee en in de lucht, together with Tom Mulder and Jack van Gelder.

In 1989, he halted these activities after switching to Joop van den Ende's television channel TV10, which eventually ceased to exist due to poor ratings. In 2000, Blom returned as a commentator at Te land, ter zee en in de lucht until the show's ultimate cancellation in 2011.

Blom died on 3 July 2017 at the age of 70.
