= Verlinden =

Verlinden is a surname. Notable people with the surname include:

- Annelies Verlinden (born 1978), Belgian politician
- Dany Verlinden (born 1963), Belgian footballer
- Filip Verlinden (born 1982), Belgian kickboxer
- Joeri Verlinden (born 1988), Dutch swimmer
- Julia Verlinden (born 1979), German politician
- Rob Verlinden (born 1950), Dutch gardener and television presenter
- Sam Verlinden (born 1997), New Zealand singer
- Thibaud Verlinden (born 1999), Belgian footballer

== See also ==
- 20798 Verlinden, main-belt asteroid
