= Cammaert =

Cammaert is a surname. Notable people with the surname include:

- Patrick Cammaert (born 1950), Dutch general
- Thomas Cammaert (born 1984), actor and singer
