= Wie is de Mol? (Dutch TV series) season 17 =

Dutch reality television season

Wie is de Mol?
- Season 17
- Presented by: Art Rooijakkers
- No. of days: 17
- No. of contestants: 10
- Winner: Sanne Wallis de Vries
- Runner-up: Jochem van Gelder
- Location: Oregon, United States
- The Mole: Thomas Cammaert
- No. of episodes: 10

Release
- Original network: AVROTROS
- Original release: January 7 – March 11, 2017

Season chronology
- ← Previous; Season 16: Dominican Republic Next → Season 18: Georgia

The 17th season of the Dutch TV series Wie is de Mol? ("Who is the Mole?") aired in the winter of 2017. Art Rooijakkers returned to host the season. The season took place in the state of Oregon in the United States. The season premiered on January 7, 2017. The Live Finale aired on March 11, 2017 where Sanne Wallis de Vries was declared the winner of the season, earning a grand total of €24,320.-. Wallis de Vries had successfully unmasked Thomas Cammaert as the Mole of 2017, outwitting her runner-up Jochem van Gelder.

== Format ==
Followed the same format as its Belgian predecessor, this season had ten Dutch celebrities travel to Oregon, United States to complete assignments to earn money for the group pot. However, one of the ten is the titular Mole (de Mol), the one designated to sabotage the assignments and cause the group to earn the least amount of money for the winner's pot as possible. Every few days, players would take a 20-question multiple choice test about the identity of the Mole. Once the test is complete, the candidates await their results in an execution ceremony. The candidate with the worst score is executed from the game, while in the event of the tie the candidate who completed their test most slowly is executed. The season plays out until there are three remaining candidates, where they must complete a final test (consisting of 40 questions). The candidate with the highest score, or had completed their test the fastest in a tie, is declared the winner and receives the group's pot.

== Candidates ==
Name	Occupation	Day Exited	Result
Thomas Cammaert	Actor	17	The Mole
Sanne Wallis de Vries	Cabaret Artist, Presenter	17	Winner
Jochem van Gelder	Presenter	17	Runner-Up
Diederik Jekel	Science Journalist	15	3rd place
Imanuelle Grives	Actress	13	4th place
Jeroen Kijk in de Vegte	Radio DJ Presenter	10	5th place
Sigrid ten Napel	Actress	8	6th place
Roos Schlikker	Columnist	6	7th place
Yvonne Coldeweijer	Vlogger, Presenter	4	8th place
Vincent Vianen	Dancer, Choreographer	2	9th place
the result in grey indicates the Mole

=== Future appearances ===
Jeroen Kijk in de Vegte returned for Wie is de Mol? Renaissance in September, 2020. In the finale, broadcast on October 24, 2020, it was revealed that he was the Mole.

== Candidate progress ==
Candidate	1 (Note: The four candidates who received exemptions during the first assignment were approached by Art individually, while watched without their knowing by the remaining six in a private theater. If all four candidates handed in their exemptions, the entire group receives a group exemption. The remaining six could take one of the four exemptions out of the game as well. Only Vincent handed in his exemption, but the six had decided to take his exemption away from him, thus no group exemption.)	2 (Note: In the event of a tie, the candidate with the lowest score and the largest time to complete their test is executed from the game. This test had a tie.)	3	4	5	6 (Note: During an assignment, Imamuelle won the ability to select two other candidates to skip their results along with her for this execution. She chose Jochem, and Diederik to skip their results, leaving only Sanne, and Thomas to see their screen.)	7	Finale (Note: The candidates wrote the test in Episode 8, but the results were only shown in episode 9.)	
Sanne									Winner
Thomas	exempt								The Mole
Jochem						exempt		exempt	Runner-Up
Diederik		exempt				exempt		Executed	
Imanuelle						exempt	Executed		
Jeroen	exempt				Executed				
Sigrid				Executed					
Roos	exempt		Executed						
Yvonne		Executed							
Vincent	Executed								

The candidate is the winner of Wie is de Mol 2017.
The candidate was unmasked as The Mole 2017.
The candidate was the losing finalist of Wie is de Mol 2017.
The candidate saw a Green Screen to proceeded to the next Episode.
The candidate used an Exemption to automatically proceed to the next Episode.
The candidate used Jokers for this test, and saw a Green Screen to proceed to the next Episode.
The candidate used Jokers for this test, however, they did not see a Green Screen before the Executed player saw their Red Screen. Thus they proceeded to the next Episode.
The candidate did not see a Green Screen before the Executed player saw their Red Screen. Thus they proceeded to the next Episode.
The candidate was executed from the game and sent home.

== Episodes ==
For more information, see: List of seasons of "Wie is de Mol?" (in Dutch)

Episode	Air Date	Title	Amount in Pot (Note: Pot earnings: indicates an increase indicates no change indicates a decrease)	Location	Days	Eliminated
1	January 7, 2017	'... Zo Gedaan'	€0 → €2,500	Portland, Oregon	1–2	Vincent
2	January 14, 2017	'Meegaand'	€2,500 → €4,200	Oregon City, Oregon - Portland, Oregon - Las Vegas, Nevada	3–4	Yvonne
3	January 21, 2017	' Ende Verhaal'	€4,200 → €6,830	Nehalem, Oregon - Manzanita, Oregon - Portland, Oregon	5–6	Roos
4	January 28, 2017	'Meer Dan Normaal'	€6,830 → €1,280	Pendleton, Oregon	7–8	Sigrid
5	February 4, 2017	'Teugels in Handen'	€1,280 → €3,880	Umatilla County, Oregon	8–10	Jeroen
6	February 11, 2017	'Wijzer Worden?'	€3,880 → €6,910	Pendleton, Oregon - Helix, Oregon - Bend, Oregon	11–12	—N/a (Note: Imamuelle won Assignment 14 earning her the ability to select two other candidates to skip their results along with herself for this execution. She chose Jochem, and Diederik to skip their results, leaving only Sanne, and Thomas to see their screen; they were green, meaning no one was executed this episode.)
7	February 18, 2017	'Verblinden'	€6,910 → €10,310	McKenzie Pass, Oregon - Bend, Oregon	13–14	Imanuelle
8	February 25, 2017	'Raam Taal'	€10,310 → €12,010	Painted Hills, Oregon - Redmond, Oregon - Fort Rock, Oregon	15–16	—N/a (Note: The quiz was taken in episode 8, but the results of the execution was withheld until episode 9.)
9	March 5, 2017	'Het Einde in Zicht'	€12,010 → €12,160	Fort Rock, Oregon - Bend, Oregon - Cascade Range, Oregon	17–18	Diederik
Finale	March 12, 2017	Finale	€12,160 → €24,320 (Note: Sanne won the final assignment in episode 9 which would double the pot if she ended up as the winner of the season. She was revealed the winner of the season during the finale thus doubling the pot she would take home from €12,160 to €24,320.)	Amsterdam, the Netherlands	Winner	Sanne
Finale	March 12, 2017	Finale	€12,160 → €24,320	Amsterdam, the Netherlands	The Mole	Thomas
Finale	March 12, 2017	Finale	€12,160 → €24,320	Amsterdam, the Netherlands	Runner-up	Jochem

== Season summary ==
=== Episode 1 – ... Zo Gedaan ===
Episode 1 – ... Zo Gedaan
Original airdates: 7 January 2017 Location: Portland, Oregon
Assignment	Money earned	Possible earnings
Assignment 1	€2,500.-	€2,500.-
Current Pot	€2,500.-	€2,500.-
Exemptions
Jeroen, Roos and Thomas	Assignment 1	
Execution
Vincent	1st player executed	

'Assignment 1'

To begin, candidates must search a forest for one of four envelopes containing a helicopter ticket which would reward four candidates with a helicopter ride to Portland a chance to earn an exemption. The remaining six candidates travel to Portland by road in one of two vans, each of which hold three candidates.

After being dropped off at a helipad, the four candidates who found the helicopter tickets had to use binoculars to search the nearby buildings for banners with a password (“Keep Portland Weird”) and the location that the password would give access to - Hawthorne Bridge. At Hawthrone Bridge, the candidates had to raise the centre section of the bridge to reach a chest containing the four exemptions. They could unlock the chest with a nearby key and win the exemptions. The candidates in the vans were given a map and a list of locations worth varying amounts of money and one with mystery prize – later revealed as the ability to remove one of the four candidate’s exemptions. These locations were: Alder Street, Central Library, Portland Art Museum, Portland Building and the Umbrella Man statue. They had one-hour from their arrival in Portland to find as many envelopes as they could.

€2,500 was earned for the pot.

The following morning, the four candidates who found the helicopter tickets were driven to Bagdad Theatre. They each met with host Art Roojakkers and are presented with the dilemma of trading their exemption for a group exemption which would ensure all ten candidates progress to the second episode. If all four exemptions were handed in, the group exemption to be attained. Unbeknownst to the four candidates, the remaining six candidates viewed this interaction and had the ability to remove one of the four candidate’s exemption regardless of their decision.

=== Episode 2 – Meegaand ===
Episode 2 – Meegaand
Original airdates: 14 January 2017 Location: Oregon City, Oregon - Portland, Oregon - Las Vegas, Nevada (Note: After Assignment 2, Roos was flown from Portland to Las Vegas, Nevada as part of the scenario she had to retell for Assignment 4. No tasks directly worth money or advantages were explicitly held in Las Vegas)
Assignment	Money earned	Possible earnings
Assignment 2	€450.-	€3,500.-
Assignment 3	€1,250.-	unknown (Note: The total earnings for Assignments 3 and 14 were unknown as the values of several aspects of the assignment were not fully revealed. Prior to the final assignment, Art revealed that the total amount of money that the group could have earned throughout the season was €56,850. As the total potential earnings for the remainder of the assignments is €49,700, it can be calculated that the total potential earnings for Assignments 3 and 14 combined is €7,150.)
Assignment 4	€0.-	€1,000.-
Current Pot	€4,200.-	€7,000.-
Exemptions
Diederik	Assignment 4	
Execution
Yvonne	2nd player executed	

'Assignment 2'

Candidates have one hour to complete seven tasks within the Blue Heron Paper Mill. Each assignment is worth varying amounts of money and require two candidates to complete them at once. During the assignment, Diederik, Jeroen and Roos were privately escorted from the group for 24 hours. Unbeknownst to the candidates, they would not return until Assignment 4.

€450 was earned for the pot.

'Assignment 3'

The six candidates not escorted during the previous assignment participate in a Laser game to earn money by taking rides worth varying amounts of money around Oaks Amusement Park. One candidate at a time is given a laser gun and walkie-talkie to communicate with the group. They must reach and ride one of the eight rides before returning to the group without having their vest hit by the amusement park’s snipers to earn money for the pot.

€1,250 was earned for the pot.

'Assignment 4'

The six candidates enter a courtroom to serve as members of a jury. There, they are given the opportunity to listen to the statements of the three escorted candidates of their actions in the last 24 hours. Diederik claimed he was taken to the Crater Lake National Park; Jeroen claimed he performed with a band while dressed as Elvis Presley; Roos claimed she was flown to Las Vegas and visited the Las Vegas Strip. Two of the candidates were telling the truth while one was lying. If the jury voted to prosecute the candidate who lied, they would earn €1,000 for the pot. Otherwise, that candidate would earn an exemption for the next quiz and no money would be earned.

The jury voted Roos as the lying candidate, however the required answer was Diederik. Therefore, no money was earned for the pot.

=== Episode 3 – Ende Verhaal ===
Episode 3 – Ende Verhaal
Original airdates: 21 January 2017 Locations: Nehalem, Oregon - Manzanita, Oregon - Portland, Oregon
Assignment	Money earned	Possible earnings
Assignment 5	€130.-	€3,000.-
Assignment 6	€2,500.-	€4,000.-
Assignment 7	€0.-	€2,000.-
Current Pot	€6,830.-	€16,000.-
Execution
Roos	3rd player executed	

'Assignment 5'

Each candidate is designated a section of the dunes of Nehalem and have 15 minutes to complete a relay race, requiring them to transfer a baton and money from one candidate to the next. To assist, the group is allowed to elect a coach to communicate how much time remains via walkie-talkie. A direct path to the finish line is the fastest route, though this path would only earn €500. The group can earn money by diverting from the main path to collect halves of banknotes worth varying amounts of money. Combining two halves of a note adds that amount of money to the pot, however any half-banknotes remaining after the last candidate finishes deducts that amount from the pot. The money is only counted if the final candidate crosses the finish line within the time-limit.

€130 was earned for the pot.

'Assignment 6'

The group must nominate two candidates who are ‘not night-blind’, who would participate in a later portion of the assignment. The remaining six candidates are taken to a beach and are given five minutes to create a picture of as many candidates as possible using provided rakes or nearby material. They could not use numbers or letters, and their only source of light for the assignment would come from fireworks launched during the assignment. After the five minutes were up, the remaining two candidates were given one minute to identify the candidate each picture represented. Each correct guess would earn €500.

€2,500 was earned for the pot.

'Assignment 7'

Candidates begin spread across four cars throughout Portland, with two candidates in each car. Each car has clues inside and part of a route printed on the outside of the car. Candidates would have to find each other to combine all four parts of the route which would direct them to their destination of Powell’s Books. Once there, they would have to use the clues to find four books containing money inside. Candidates are not allowed to park the car and had to follow all traffic rules; the time-limit for the assignment is one-hour.

No money was earned for the pot.

=== Episode 4 – Meer Dan Normaal ===
Episode 4 – Meer Dan Normaal
Original airdates: 28 January 2017 Location: Pendleton, Oregon
Assignment	Money earned	Possible earnings
Assignment 8	€500.-	€3,500.-
Assignment 9	€750.-	€2,000.-
Assignment 10	€6,800.-	€500.-
Current Pot	€1,280.-	€22,000.-
Jokers
Diederik, Jochem and Sanne	Assignment 10	
Execution
Sigird	4th player executed	

'Assignment 8'

One by one, candidates make it from one side of the Pendleton Round Up stadium to the other, collecting a lasso along the way. Each candidate to complete this earns €250 for the pot and the lasso they collected would be considered out of play for the final round. In the arena is a cowboy or cowgirl attempting to stop them using a lasso. For the final candidate’s attempt, the cowboy or cowgirl first had to collect a lasso left behind by the previous candidates before pursuing the candidate. If the final candidate succeeded, they would double the money earned.

€500 was earned for the pot.

'Assignment 9'

Candidates have 15 minutes to search through dozens of hay bales to find banners worth varying amounts of money inside four of the bales. Any money found is added to the pot.

€750 was earned for the pot.

'Assignment 10'

Each candidate individually meets with Art and is asked how much money they would spend for three Jokers. The treasurer (Jeroen) is told the average of the group’s answers and that candidates would be bidding for Jokers. If they spend below the average of €1,300, they would earn €500 for the pot and no money would be removed. However, if they spent over €1,300, the extra money spent would be deducted from the pot Jeroen could insure the pot by an amount of his choosing by paying a half-price premium. For example, if he believed the group would spend €5300 on the Jokers (€4,000 above the average), he could insure the pot by paying half of the €4,000 so that no further money is lost up to €5,300. Candidates would then bid for one Joker at a time with money from the pot.

€6,800 was removed from the pot.

=== Episode 5 – Teugels in Handen ===
Episode 5 – Teugels in Handen
Original airdates: 4 February 2017 Location: Umatilla County, Oregon
Assignment	Money earned	Possible earnings
Assignment 11	€2,600.-	€14,000.-
Current Pot	€3,880.-	€36,000.-
Jokers
Jochem and Thomas	Assignment 11	
Execution
Jeroen	5th player executed	

'Assignment 11'

Beginning at the Battle Mountain Scenic Corridor, candidates had to travel 16 km along the Oregon Trail in one of three horse-drawn wagons. They would travel as a group and had to arrive at the finish by 1:30pm the following day. There were also tasks they could complete along the way to earn money. At the first task, each candidate is given a shotgun and 20 bullets. They had to fire at targets which would sporadically open and close. Each bullseye they hit would earn €100.

During the overnight camping portion, each candidate was randomly assigned an envelope which gave them instructions to attain Jokers. Four candidates could obtain Jokers by collecting them somewhere along the trail without being seen by anyone. Two other candidates could create Jokers by finding a branding iron within the provided baggage and using it to mark wooden discs.

At the second task, one candidate is shown ten U.S. rodeo posters and must describe them to the other candidates via walkie talkie. The remaining candidates must find the correct posters from a field of 130 posters and collect the envelope on the back. Once all ten envelopes are collected, the puzzle pieces inside form one final poster when solved. They would have to find this poster in the field to earn the €2000 inside of the poster’s envelope. The time-limit for this task is 20 minutes.

€2,600 was earned for the pot.

=== Episode 6 – Wijzer Worden? ===
Episode 6 – Wijzer Worden?
Original airdates: 11 February 2017 Locations: Pendleton, Oregon - Helix, Oregon - Bend, Oregon
Assignment	Money earned	Possible earnings
Assignment 12	€400.-	€700.-
Assignment 13	€2,000.-	€2,000.-
Assignment 14	€630.-	unknown
Current Pot	€6,910.-	€38,700.-
Execution
No one executed

'Assignment 12'

The group must select two candidates with a good memory. They would have to enter the underground tunnels within Pendleon’s red light district and memorise the locations of several notes worth both positive and negative amounts of money. The remaining three candidates would later enter the same tunnels, however the life-size figurines were replaced by real people and their only source of light would be handheld lanterns. The two candidates with a good memory had to direct the remaining candidates via walkie-talkie to location of money where they would find an envelope containing the respective amount. However, they would also have to avoid collecting nearby envelopes worth negative amounts of money which would deduct money from the pot.

€400 was earned for the pot.

'Assignment 13'

Three candidates have 15 minutes to mow a word in a field of grass using tractors. The more letters in the word, the more money the word potentially earns. After the time-limit has elapsed, the remaining two candidates must guess the word from a distance. If the word is correctly guessed, the value the word is added to the pot.

€2,000 was earned for the pot.

'Assignment 14'

Candidates must individually search for eight members of a crowd at Helix Rodeo holding a walkie-talkie. Once a walkie-talkie has been found, they must notify Art on the other end of the walkie-talkie to have their discovery recorded and the associated monetary value added to the pot. Only the values of the first four walkie-talkies found are added to the pot. Additionally, the candidate who earns the most money in the assignment wins a special prize – they would not see their screen at the next execution and could choose two other candidates also not to see their screen.

€630 was earned for the pot. Imanuelle won and did not need to see her screen at the next execution; she would then select an additional two candidates (Diederick and Jochem) to also not see their screen.

=== Episode 7 – Verblinden ===
Episode 7 – Verblinden
Original airdates: 18 February 2017 Locations: Mckenzie Pass, Oregon - Bend, Oregon
Assignment	Money earned	Possible earnings
Assignment 15	€800.-	€2,500.-
Assignment 16	€1,500.-	€1,500.-
Assignment 17	€1,100.-	€2,500.-
Current Pot	€10,310.-	€45,200.-
Execution
Imanuelle	6th player executed	

'Assignment 15'

Candidates begin at five separate locations across the Dee Wright Observatory of the McKenzie Pass. Each station has five questions about the other candidates which must be answered in 15 minutes. Candidates can use two provided walkie-talkies to communicate to other candidates, however one of them only be used to speak while the other can only be used to listen. Unbeknownst to the candidates, each of their walkie-talkies could only be used to speak with or listen to one other candidate instead of the entire group. For each question answered correctly, €100 is added to the pot.

€800 was earned for the pot.

'Assignment 16'

The group must select three candidates to ride in a Ford Mustang while the remaining two would later enter hot-air balloons. The candidates in the Mustang would have to find the two hot-air balloons and combine the two number sequences written on the bottom to form a phone number. They would then call the number to give one candidate in the hot-air balloon the code 3-6-2. Once that candidate opens an envelope using the aforementioned code, they find a second phone number and another code. They must call the second phone number to reach the other candidate in a hot-air balloon and tell them the code to unlock the required location which the candidates in the Mustang would have to travel to, Peter Skene Ogden State Scenic Viewpoint. If the candidates in the Mustang arrived at the location before 8am, the group would earn €1,500.

€1,500 was earned for the pot.

'Assignment 17'

To determine the starting order, candidates had to go horseback riding around a course. The candidate with the fastest time would be first in the starting order for the assignment. After a training session, candidates would have to participate in the sport called cowboy mounted shooting, riding a horse around the same course while shooting at five targets using a pistol. Each candidate has five bullets to earn €100 for each target they hit: if they finish faster than the time they set in the horseback riding portion of the assignment.

€1,100 was earned for the pot.

=== Episode 8 - Raam Taal ===
Episode 8 – Raam Taal
Original airdates: 25 February 2017 Locations: Painted Hills, Oregon - Redmond, Oregon - Fort Rock, Oregon
Assignment	Money earned	Possible earnings
Assignment 18	€0.-	€1,000.-
Assignment 19	€1,700.-	€2,000.-
Assignment 20	N/A	N/A
Current Pot	€12,010.-	€48,200.-
Exemptions
Jochem	Assignment 11	

'Assignment 18'

Candidates begin at different locations along a road of the Painted Hills and are each given a bicycle. On the road are find 26 stands, each holding a letter of the alphabet. They must rearrange the letters in alphabetical order and can only take one letter at a time. If all the letters were in alphabetical order after 30 minutes, €1000 would be earned for the pot.

No money was earned for the pot.

'Assignment 19'

The group is divided into two pairs, each pair is then taken to an antique shop and given a list of proverbs. They had to select ten proverbs from the list and use antiques from the store to recreate the proverb, capturing a photo using a camera. After the allotted 45 minutes are up, pairs are shown the photographs and must guess each other’s proverbs. For each correct guess, €100 is added to the pot.

€1,700 was earned for the pot.

'Assignment 20'

Candidates begin spread out in a field, equidistant from a pole containing an exemption. Each contestant is wearing a colored vest which they must conceal from the other candidates. The candidate who reaches the pole wins the exemption. However, candidates can eliminate each other by telling Art the name of a candidate and the color of their vest via walkie-talkie. The first candidate to reach the exemption, or the last candidate standing, wins the exemption and is guaranteed a spot in the finale.

Jochem won the exemption and was guaranteed a place in the finale. The candidates wrote the test in Episode 8, however the outcome would not be revealed until episode 9.

=== Episode 9 - Het Einde in Zicht ===
Episode 9 – Het Einde in Zicht
Original airdates: 4 March 2017 Locations: Fort Rock, Oregon - Bend, Oregon - Cascade Range, Oregon
Assignment	Money earned	Possible earnings
Assignment 21	€150.-	€1,500.-
Assignment 22	€12,160.- (Note: The winner of Assignment 22 would double the final pot if they were the eventual winner of the season. Sanne won Assignment 22 in episode 9 and was crowned the winner in the following finale episode thus doubling the total pot she would claim. The doubling of the pot is reflected in the assignment's earnings and the value of the final pot.)	€56,850.-
Final Pot	€24,320.-	€113,700.-
Execution
Diederik	7th player executed	

The execution from the episode 8 test occurs at the beginning of the episode.

'Assignment 21'

Candidates are taken to a ghost town dubbed “Moltown” near Fort Rock. They had to determine the names of former residents of the town’s houses, as well as street names, based on a series of biographical recounts and cryptic clues. For each resident or street name they correctly identified, €50 is added to the pot. If they identified all the residents and street names correctly, earn a bonus amount of money which would total €1,500. The time limit for the assignment is 20 minutes.

'Assignment 22'

Candidates compete against each other for a chance to double the pot. Candidates had to find the trees around Shevlin Park with various amounts of money pinned to them. They had to connect a series of trees using rope until the sum from the trees totalled the current group pot (€12,160). Once complete, they must return to their station to solve a tangram puzzle. The first candidate to complete the puzzle wins and doubles the group pot – if they end up as the eventual winner of Wie is de Mol?

=== Episode 10 – Finale ===
Episode 10 - Finale
Original airdates: 11 March 2017
Location: Amsterdam, Netherlands
Winner
Sanne Wallis de Vries
The Mole
Thomas Cammaert
Runner-up
Jochem van Gelder

== Mole Sabotage ==
The following acts of sabotage were revealed at the finale.

Assignment 2: Thomas wasted time by misleading his group while searching for assignments to complete.

Assignment 4: Thomas identified Diederik as the liar and persuaded the group that Roos was the liar, leading to the group incorrectly guessing the lying candidate.

Assignment 5: Thomas kept €500 in his pocket, preventing it from being added to the pot. He also collected half the banknotes when the other half was not in possession, meaning money would be lost.

Assignment 7: As the driver of a car, Thomas drove past yellow lights to lose trailing cars in order to prevent the route from being combined.

Assignment 8: Thomas slowed down while running to the finish line and extended his arm, allowing the cowboy to lasso him and losing the money.

Assignment 9: Thomas continuously put bid for the Jokers to raise the price candidates had to pay from the pot to buy them.

Assignment 14: Thomas found a spectator worth €750, however he elected not to report this to Art meaning the value was not added to the pot.

Assignment 15: Thomas feigned confusion throughout the assignment and did not attempt to fully communicate with other candidates.

Assignment 17: Thomas completed the horseback ride as fast as possible to lower his potential time to shoot during the cowboy mounted shooting session. He also pretended not to hear the other candidates indicating how much time he had remaining, using the provided earplugs as an excuse.

Assignment 21: Thomas switched the positions of several correctly placed signs throughout the assignment.
