= Joyride (2005 film) =

- Directed by: Frank Herrebout
- Written by: Frank Herrebout; Leo van Maaren
- Produced by: Frank Herrebout; Leo van Maaren
- Starring: Peggy Vrijens; Georgina Verbaan; Tygo Gernandt; Dorien Haan; Don Clovis
- Music by: Epica
- Release date: 1 February 2005
- Language: Dutch

Joyride is a 2005 adventure mystery film from the Netherlands which featured the music from symphonic metal band Epica. A Dutch road movie, in the film a group of women going to a fashion show deal with a stranger they encounter in an unusual manner.

== Cast ==
- Peggy Vrijens as Joy
- Georgina Verbaan as Chantal
- Tygo Gernandt as Tim
- Dorien Haan as Roos
- Don Clovis as Forester

== Plot ==
Three girls steal an antique convertible car, a red 1969 Cadillac DeVille, and head up for a model contest in Southern France. On the road, they discover an unconscious young man in the trunk. One of the girls confesses that she is responsible for it and that she plans to get rid of him.

== The Score – An Epic Journey ==
The album The Score – An Epic Journey by Epica is the soundtrack to the film. Most of the songs of the album are instrumental, except for three songs. The three songs that do feature the singing voice of Simone Simons ("Trois Vierges", "Solitary Ground", "Quietus") are different versions of songs from the album Consign to Oblivion, which was released earlier the same year.

=== Track listing ===
No.	Title	Lyrics	Music	Length
1.	"Vengeance Is Mine"		Mark Jansen	1:53
2.	"Unholy Trinity"		Yves Huts	3:09
3.	"The Valley"		Huts	2:09
4.	"Caught in a Web"		Jansen, Coen Janssen, Huts	4:25
5.	"Insomnia"		Jansen	2:07
6.	"Under the Aegis"		Huts, Jansen	2:49
7.	"Trois Vierges" (solo version)	Simone Simons	Jansen, Janssen, S. Simons	4:41
8.	"Mystica"		Huts	2:45
9.	"Valley of Sins"		Jansen	5:39
10.	"Empty Gaze"		Jansen	2:09
11.	"The Alleged Paradigm"		Jansen, Huts	2:23
12.	"Supremacy"		Jansen, Huts	3:19
13.	"Beyond the Depth"		Jansen	1:55
14.	"Epitome"		Huts, Jansen	1:17
15.	"Inevitable Embrace"		Jansen	3:50
16.	"Angel of Death"		Jansen	3:28
17.	"The Ultimate Return"		Jansen	4:46
18.	"Trois Vierges" (reprise)		Jansen, Janssen, S. Simons	2:04
19.	"Solitary Ground" (single version)	S. Simons	Janssen, Jansen, Ad Sluijter, S. Simons	4:05
20.	"Quietus" (score version)	S. Simons	Jansen, Huts, Janssen, Sluijter, S. Simons, Jeroen Simons	3:55
