= Wie is de Mol? Renaissance =

Dutch reality television season

- Presented by: Rik van de Westelaken
- No. of days: 15
- No. of contestants: 10
- Winner: Nikkie de Jager
- Runner-up: Tygo Gernandt
- Location: Tuscany, Italy
- The Mole: Jeroen Kijk in de Vegte
- No. of episodes: 8

Release
- Original network: AVROTROS (NPO 1)
- Original release: 5 September – 24 October 2020

Season chronology
- ← Previous; Season 20: China Next → Season 21: Czechia

Wie is de Mol? Renaissance is a special anniversary season of the Dutch TV series Wie is de Mol? ("Who is the Mole?"). This All Star edition was announced at the end of the Season 20 finale and in celebration of the series reaching its twentieth season. The season took place in the region of Tuscany in Italy. This is the seventh season to have been filmed in Europe, following, Scotland in Season 2, Portugal in Season 3, Northern Ireland in Season 9, Iceland and Spain in Season 12, and Georgia in Season 18, respectively.

Rik van de Westelaken returned to host the season. The season premiered on September 5, 2020 for a shorter 8-episode season. The season Finale aired on 24 October 2020, with Nikkie de Jager fooling fellow finalist Tygo Gernandt and unmasking Jeroen Kijk in de Vegte as the Jubilee Mole of 2020. With the winnings of €12,580.-, de Jager decided to donate it all to KWF Kankerbestrijding (Dutch Cancer Society) in memory of her brother who died in 2018 shortly after she returned from Season 19.

== Format ==
Followed the same format as its Belgian predecessor, ten candidates were gathered to complete Assignments to earn money for the group pot. However, one of the ten is the titular Mole (de Mol), the one designated to sabotage the assignments and cause the group to earn the least amount of money for the winner's pot as possible. Every few days, players would take a 20-question multiple choice test about the identity of the Mole. Once the test is complete, the candidates await their results in an Execution ceremony. The candidate with the worst score is executed from the game, while in the event of the tie the candidate who completed their test the slowest is executed. The season plays out until there are three remaining candidates, where they must complete a final test (consisting of 40 questions). The candidate with the highest score, or who had completed their test the fastest in a tie, is declared the winner and receives the group's pot.

The season took place in Tuscany, Italy. For the first time in Wie is de Mol's history, the ten candidates were returning players, from over the 20 seasons. Nine were given a second chance to successfully find the Mole and win the game, while the tenth became The Mole. The broadcast of the premiere on September 5, 2020 revealed that candidates ranging back from Season 6 in 2006 up until Season 20 in 2020 were brought back to play the game again.

== Candidates ==
Name	Occupation	Original Season	Original placement	Day Exited	Result
Jeroen Kijk in de Vegte	Radio DJ Presenter	17: Oregon, USA	5th place	14	The Mole
Nikkie de Jager	Beauty YouTuber	19: Colombia	8th place	14	Winner
Tygo Gernandt	Actor	14: Hong Kong & Philippines	3rd place	14	Runner Up
Peggy Vrijens	Actress	06: Argentina	3rd place	13	3rd place
Ron Boszhard	Television Presenter	18: Georgia	9th place	12	4th/5th place
Patrick Martens	Actor, Presenter	08: Mexico	3rd place	12	4th/5th place
Ellie Lust	Former Police Spokesperson	16: Dominican Republic	7th place	9	6th place
Horace Cohen	Actor, Comedian	11: El Salvador & Nicaragua	8th place	7	7th place
Nadja Hüpscher	Actress	07: Thailand	4th place	4	8th place
Tina de Bruin	Actress	20: China	8th place	3	9th place
the result in grey indicates the Mole

== Candidates Progress ==
The order in which the candidates learned their results are indicated in the table below.

Summary of candidates progress in each episode
Candidate	1	2 (Note: Ellie and Nadja both used Jokers in this test.) (Note: At the Execution Ceremony, one of the candidates' seats was placed next to Rik. Ellie elected to sit on this seat, where Rik arrived to inform the group that Ellie had earned herself an Exemption because of it.)	3	4 (Note: There was a tie for the lowest score, and Ellie had the slowest time, thus executed from the game.)	6 (Note: There was no Execution at the end of Episode 5, as the candidates were competing in an assignment. Therefore there was a Double Execution in Episode 6. Patrick saw his results first, while Ron was the last to see his screen, having been executed from the game by process of elimination.) (Note: Nikkie and Tygo successfully avoided being found by the group in OnvoorspELBAar and earned exemptions from the Double Execution.)	7	Finale (Note: The Final Test took place in Episode 7, the results were revealed in the Finale.)
Nikkie	2nd	3rd	3rd		exempt	1st	Winner
Jeroen			1st		2nd		The Mole
Tygo		4th	4th		exempt	2nd	Runner-Up
Peggy		1st	2nd		3rd	Executed	
Ron	3rd				Executed (4th)		
Patrick		2nd			Executed (1st)		
Ellie		exempt	5th	Executed			
Horace	1st		Executed				
Nadja		Executed					
Tina	Executed						

The candidate is the winner of Wie is de Mol? Renaissance.
The candidate was unmasked as The Renaissance Mole.
The candidate was the runner-up of Wie is de Mol? Renaissance.
The candidate saw a Green Screen to proceeded to the next Episode.
The candidate used Jokers for this test, and saw a Green Screen to proceed to the next Episode.
The candidate used Jokers for this test, however, they did not see a Green Screen before the Executed player saw their Red Screen. Thus they proceeded to the next Episode.
The candidate did not see a Green Screen before the Executed player saw their Red Screen. Thus they proceeded to the next Episode.
The candidate received an Exemption to automatically proceed to the next Episode.
The candidate was executed from the game and sent home.

== Episodes ==
Episode	Air Date	Title	Amount in Pot (Note: Pot earnings: indicates an increase indicates no change indicates a decrease)	Location	Days	Eliminated	Video
1	September 5, 2020	'Renaissance'	€0 → €750 (Note: Horace earned €250 in Achter je Rug, but chose not to reveal it to the rest of the group. Thus it is not acknowledged in the Pot Total)	Pienza, Siena → Montalcino, Siena	1—3	Tina	
2	September 12, 2020	'Listig' (Cunning)	€750 → €2,610	Pienza, Siena	3—4	Nadja	
3	September 19, 2020	'Besluit' (Decision)	€2,610 → €6,360 (Note: Horace added the €250 he collected in Episode 1 to the pot.) (Note: Jeroen had collected €100 in Sleutel Bos that he chose not add to the pot.)	Pienza, Siena	5—7	Horace	
4	September 26, 2020	'Meesterlijk' (Masterful)	€6,360 → €8,110	Pienza, Siena → Florence, Metropolitan City of Florence	7—9	Ellie	
5	October 3, 2020	'Wegwerken' (Eliminate)	€8,110	Florence, Metropolitan City of Florence → Pisa, Pisa → Elba, Livorno	10—11	N/A (Note: There was no Execution ceremony in this episode. No-one went home.)	
6	October 10, 2020	'Damocles'	€8,110 → €11,510	Florence, Metropolitan City of Florence → Pisa, Pisa → Elba, Livorno	12	Patrick	
6	October 10, 2020	'Damocles'	€8,110 → €11,510	Florence, Metropolitan City of Florence → Pisa, Pisa → Elba, Livorno	12	Ron	
7	October 17, 2020	'Déjà Vu'	€11,510 → €12,580	Elba, Livorno → La Foce, Siena	13—14	Peggy	
8	October 24, 2020	'Finale'	€12,580	Amsterdam, Netherlands	Runner-up	Tygo	
8	October 24, 2020	'Finale'	€12,580	Amsterdam, Netherlands	Winner	Nikkie	
8	October 24, 2020	'Finale'	€12,580	Amsterdam, Netherlands	The Mole	Jeroen	

== Season summary ==
=== Episode 1 - Renaissance ===
Episode 1 - Renaissance
Original airdates: 5 September 2020 Locations: Pienza, Siena → Poppi, Arezzo → Montalcino, Siena
Assignment	Money earned	Possible earnings
Spiegelbeeld	€1,000.-	€2,000.-
Gastenlijst	€250.-	€2,000.-
Achter je Rug	€0.- (Note: Horace earned €250 in this assignment, but chose not to reveal it and add it to the pot. The total amount earned reflects his decision.)	€2,500.-
Current Pot	€750.-	€6,500.-
Jokers
Ron	Achter je Rug	
Execution
Tina	1st player executed	

'Spiegelbeeld' (Reflection) - Max. €2,000.-

Starting outside of Monticchiello, Siena, five candidates drive themselves into the small village to find the remaining candidates. At the start of each route, the drivers could call one of the candidates in the village with information about the assignment. Inside the village hid ten mirrors with quotes linking back to each candidate's letter to the new Mole. The assignment is complete if all ten mirrors are placed in the village square outside the church before 11am (CET). (An hour and 15 minutes time limit.) Once all the mirrors were gathered, each candidate had to stand in front of their corresponding quote to earn another €1,000 for the first group photo of the season.

The group successfully gathered all ten mirrors to add €1,000 for the pot, but Rik informed the group that they had failed the group photo portion of the assignment.

'Gastenlijst' (Guest List) - Max. €2,000.-

After allocating who the group's treasurer would be, they were tasked to pick two candidates who were most wanting to earn money for the pot at dinner in San Quirico d'Orcia. The eight excluded candidates had to fill out a list of common Italian names, and then go out to invite people with these names to dinner. The two money earners had to then bet up to €2,000 on which names the group managed to bring to dinner. Any seats with the correct name and bet would earn money for the pot, but any bets unfulfilled would remove money from the pot. Any people who were found to be lying about their names for the assignment would automatically remove money from the pot.

The group managed to earn €500 for the pot, before it was discovered which guests had lied about their names, causing the group to lose €250 from the pot in total.

'Achter je Rug' (Behind Your Back) - Max. €2,500.-

One by one, the candidates were taken to Poppi Castle for a meeting, with one rule in place, before they meet their guest, that they were not allowed to take anything in the five boxes before them. Awaiting the candidates were five previous Moles imparting them insight on the game and advice from the candidate's past mistakes. Once the former Moles had given their information, the candidates could only take one item from the boxes, but not walk back once they passed a box. Inside the boxes were a green exemption, a joker, two €250 notes, and one box was empty.

Horace had earned €250 in the assignment, but chose not to add it to the pot.

=== Episode 2 - Listig ===
Episode 2 - Listig
Original airdates: 12 September 2020 Locations: Pienza, Siena
Assignment	Money earned	Possible earnings
Steen Rijk	€100.-	€2,222.50
Meeslepend	€260.-	€2,000.-
Vragenvuur	€1,500.-	€1,500.-
Current Pot	€2,610.-	€12,222.50
Jokers
Ellie, Nadja	Steen Rijk	
Horace, Patrick	Meeslepend	
Exemption
Ellie	Execution Exemption (Note: Ellie was granted an Exemption for sitting next to Rik at the Execution ceremony.)	
Execution
Nadja	2nd player executed	

'Steen Rijk' (Stone Rich) - Max. €2,222.50

Divided into two teams, the group are tasked to carry stones and meet each other along a 2 km trail. Along the way, the teams could trade their stones for money. The teams must meet within 45 minutes, and at a meeting point with a multiplier. If they meet anywhere else, or not meet in time, no money is earned for the pot.

The group managed to meet at a meeting point with a Half multiplier that reduced their total to €97,50, which Rik rounded-up to €100 for the group to add to the pot.

'Meeslepend' (Immersive) - Max. €2,000.-

For the season's laser assignment, the group were tasked to navigate through a warehouse course, avoiding booby traps and shooters. Being shot or tripping a booby trap removed a candidate from the assignment. Along the course were money which had to be placed inside a chest, and Jokers for specific candidates. If the candidates manage to get the chest across the finish line, they would earn any money and Jokers left inside the chest.

The group completed the assignment and earned €260 for the pot.

'Vragenvuur' (Questioning) - Max. €1,500.-

The group's treasurer was tasked to pairing up the group for a short contest. Each pair had to come up with questions and answers about a mystery topic in two minutes, with the pair with the most correct answers earning a chance for a Black Exemption. Once the winning pair is known, the treasurer has to decide to either share the Black Exemption with the pair, or elect to put €1,500 into the pot.

Ellie and Jeroen won the contest, but Patrick, as the treasurer, chose to put the €1,500 into the pot instead of introducing the Black Exemption into the game.

=== Episode 3 - Besluit ===
Episode 3 - Besluit
Original airdates: 19 September 2020 Locations: Pienza, Siena → Pitigliano, Grosseto → Radicofani, Siena
Assignment	Money earned	Possible earnings
Sleutel Bos	€1,300.- (Note: Jeroen earned an additional €100 in this assignment, but chose not to reveal it and add it to the pot. The total amount earned reflects his decision.)	€2,000.-
Meer of Min	€1,000.-	€2,000.-
Fortuin?	€1,450.- (Note: Horace added the €250 he earned in Achter Je Rug at the end of this assignment.)	€1,600.-
Current Pot	€6,360.-	€17,822.50
Execution
Horace	3rd player executed	

'Sleutel Bos' (Keychain, or, Key Forest) - Max. €2,000.-

Spread throughout an Olive field, the candidates are chained to trees with four locks, and have 30 minutes to free themselves. Once they are free or can move far enough from their tree, they can pick up money off three tubes near their person. Each tube had money for a specific candidate. If the correct money is with the correct candidate within 30 minutes, it will be added to the pot.

The group successfully added €1,300 to the pot, with Jeroen choosing to not disclose an extra correct €100 in his possession

'Meer of Min' (More or Less) - Max. €2,000.-

Taken to the village of Pitigliano, Grosseto, the group were split into two. The four candidates outside of the village have a clear view of red blinds that represent minus money. While the others are placed inside the village to find and open the blinds. If the candidates manage to open all the red blinds within 30 minutes, they keep the full total of €2,000 given to them at the start of the assignment.

The group managed to open 5 out of the 10 blinds, keeping €1,000 for the pot.

'Fortuin?' (Fortune?) - Max. €1,600.-

Arriving at the Fort in Radicofani, Siena, the group are informed that they can complete four tasks within the fort, earning shields in a time limit of 30 minutes. The more shields they collect, the bigger the chance to the maximum of €1,600 for the pot. After the shields are collected, the candidates may shoot at them with a bow and arrow, a successful hit adds €200 per shield. The assignment begins with the candidates using a battering ram to open up the fort.

The group managed to retrieve and shoot six shields for €1,200 for the pot. Horace also added in his €250 note he collected from Poppi Castle in Episode 1.

=== Episode 4 - Meesterlijk ===
Episode 4 - Meesterlijk
Original airdates: 26 September 2020 Locations: Pienza, Siena → Metropolitan City of Florence
Assignment	Money earned	Possible earnings
Meesterwerken	€1,000.-	€2,000.-
Follow the Money	€0.-	€2,250.-
Groeten uit Florence	€750.-	€1,350.-
Current Pot	€8,110.-	€23,422.50
Execution
Ellie	4th player executed	

'Meesterwerken'(Masterpieces) - Max. €2,000.-

The candidates were escorted from the previous Execution ceremony into three vehicles for the next destination. The two duos were taken to Leonardo Da Vinci and Michelangelo's birthplaces respectively. Awaiting them were two famous replica paintings and empty canvases. The duo must describe their replica to their partners to be able to recreate them. They have three hours to paint.

And the remaining trio were driven to Uffizi in Florence, and instructed to find the four correct originals that the duos replicated. Finding the correct originals gives a code for the two duos to unlock a chest in their location. If the chests are unlocked within an hour, the group earns 1,000 per chest.

The group managed to unlock one chest and add 1,000 to the pot.

Follow the Money - Max. €2,250.-

The candidates arrive at Piazza Della Signoria where they must keep track of a suitcase full of money. Amidst the square, a number of similarly dressed people will start exchanging matching suitcases. After 15 minutes, the candidates must select who has the correct suitcase to earn money for the pot.

The candidates selected the correct suitcase, but to keep the money, they had to identify the three former Moles that were in the Square with them. They were incorrect, thus nothing was added to the pot.

'Groeten uit Florence' (Greetings from Florence) - Max. €1,350.-

On a walk around the city, the candidates are given postcards that they must photograph in the correct perspective for money. The treasurer was assigned to designate the three teams. One photo per sight is allowed, if multiples are submitted, only the first photo is accepted. The group have 45 minutes to complete the assignment.

The results were revealed at the Execution ceremony later, that the group had added €750 to the pot with their photographs.

=== Episode 5 - Wegwerken ===
Episode 5 - Wegwerken
Original airdates: 3 October 2020 Locations: Metropolitan City of Florence → Pisa, Pisa → Piombino, Livorno
Assignment	Money earned	Possible earnings
Stuk voor Stuk	€0.-	€`1,750.-
Route Beschrijving	€0.-	€1,500.-
Current Pot	€8,110.-	€26,672.50
Execution
No player executed

'Stuk voor Stuk' (Piece by Piece) - Max. €1,750.-

Spread throughout the beach are puzzle pieces. 30 minutes time limit. Using their memory of the game so far, the candidates must assemble a puzzle from pieces scattered along the beach. Each piece represented a previous assignment in the season so far. If the group can correctly assemble the puzzle within 30 minutes, they will earn €1,750 for the pot.

The group failed the assignment.

Follow the Money - Max. €1,500.-

Arriving at their hotel, the candidates were instructed to form duos and open one of three envelopes. Each envelope gave a duo a road address, and a different coloured vehicle they must use the next day.

In each car, are directions for a different duo somewhere in the city of Pisa. Over a conference phone call, the candidates must navigate each other to the correction destination within an hour to earn €1,500 for the pot.

Only 1 duo arrived on time, meaning the group failed their assignment. And one duo arrived at a separate destination outside of Pisa that granted them an exemption from the upcoming test.

=== Episode 6 - Damocles ===
Episode 6 - Damocles
Original airdates: 10 October 2020 Locations: Piombino, Livorno → Elba, Livorno
Assignment	Money earned	Possible earnings
OnvoorspELBAar	€3,400.-	€4,500.-
Current Pot	€11,510.-	€31,172.50
Exemptions
Nikkie & Tygo	OnvoorspELBAar	
Execution
Patrick	5th player executed	
Ron	6th player executed	

'OnvoorspELBAar' (Unpredictable) - Max. €4,500.-

At the debriefing of Route Beschrijving, Rik informed the duos in front of him to find the third duo, as they have been granted an exemption from a Double Execution. With their passports, a car, and €500 each, the candidates must find the Exempt duo in 24 hours. If the group successfully finds the Exempt duo, all six candidates will write the test for the Double Execution, nullifying the Exemptions. The assignment saw the group arrive in Piombino and identifying that the island of Elba was their destination.

In five locations upon arrival to Elba, the candidates could find leather sacks of Mole coins, and clues to the location of where the Exempt Duo were locked up that day. The Exempt Duo were locked up in a cell, where the two doors to escape were chained together with 3 chains. If the Exempt Duo could saw through all three chains and escape the fort without being caught, they would be granted their exemptions from the Double Execution.

Despite successfully finding the key to Fort Falcone, where the duo were being kept, and collecting €3,400 for the pot along the way, the group narrowly failed in finding the duo before they could escape their cell.

=== Episode 7 - Déjà Vu ===
Episode 7 - Déjà Vu
Original airdates: 17 October 2020 Locations: Elba, Livorno → La Foce, Siena
Assignment	Money earned	Possible earnings
(Weer) Achter Je Rug	€0.-	€3,000.-
Wegdenken	€320.-	€3,410.-
Mijn Geluid	€750.-	€1,500.-
Final Pot	€12,580.-	€39,082.50
Execution
Peggy	7th player executed	

'(Weer) Achter Je Rug' ((Again) Behind Your Back) - Max. €3,000.-

Dropped off at the Abbey of San Galgano, the candidates are faced with a second coming of Achter Je Rug from Episode 1. In the boxes awaiting the candidates is money for the pot, and information about how the other 3 have been playing the game throughout the season. At the end of the path stood more former Moles to impart wisdom to each of the candidates before they could claim one item inside the Abbey. If a candidate chose an envelope with a Question Mark, they were taken to a room with the Mirrors from the first assignment to study the Mole's handwriting.

All of the candidates chose to see the mirrors from the first assignment, adding nothing to the pot. Shortly after the assignment, the candidates partook in a test and execution before the finale.

'Wegdenken' (Think Away) - Max. €3,410.-

Placed along a road at Tenuta Argentiera, the finalists were given 30 minutes to make words using the barrels along the road. Just like Scrabble, the longer the word, the more money they could earn. If they wanted to use a blank barrel to form a word, that would cost €50 out of the total €3,410 they could earn.

The candidates managed to form _ words, adding €320 to the pot.

'Mijn Geluid' (Mine Sound) - Max. €1,500.-

Riding along the tracks in the San Silverstro mine, the finalists had to interview each other from their respective carts for their final assignment for the season. At the end of the ride, Rik would ask the candidates 2 question each for €250.

The candidates managed to answer 3 questions correctly, adding €750 to the pot.

=== Episode 8 - Finale ===
The finale was held at the Vondelkerk (Vondel Church) in Amsterdam. Due to the COVID-19 pandemic, the finale was not broadcast live and was held without an audience.

Episode 8 - Finale
Original airdates: 24 October 2020
Locations: Amsterdam, Netherlands
Losing Finalist
Tygo Gernardt
Winner
Nikkie de Jager
The Mole
Jeroen Kijk in de Vegte

== Reception ==
=== Viewing Figures ===
For more information, see: List of seasons of "Wie is de Mol?" (in Dutch)

Viewing Figures
#	Title	Air Date	Time Slot	Average	Total (Note: These figures include Delayed viewings for at least 1 consecutive minute.)
1	Renaissance	September 5, 2020	Saturday 20.30 CET	2,665,000	3,508,000
2	Listig (Cunning)	September 12, 2020	Saturday 20.30 CET	2,590,000	3.415.000
3	Besluit (Decision)	September 19, 2020	Saturday 20.30 CET	2.406.000	3,211,000
4	Meesterlijk (Masterful)	September 26, 2020	Saturday 20.30 CET	2,555,000	3,375,000
5	Wegwerken (Eliminate/Roadwork)	October 3, 2020	Saturday 20.30 CET	2,554,000	3,397,000
6	Damocles	October 10, 2020	Saturday 20.30 CET	2,760,000	3,410,000
7	Déjà Vu	October 17, 2020	Saturday 20.30 CET	2,837,000	3,836,000
8	Finale	October 24, 2020	Saturday 20.30 CET		
