= Ron Boszhard =

Dutch television presenter (born 1963)

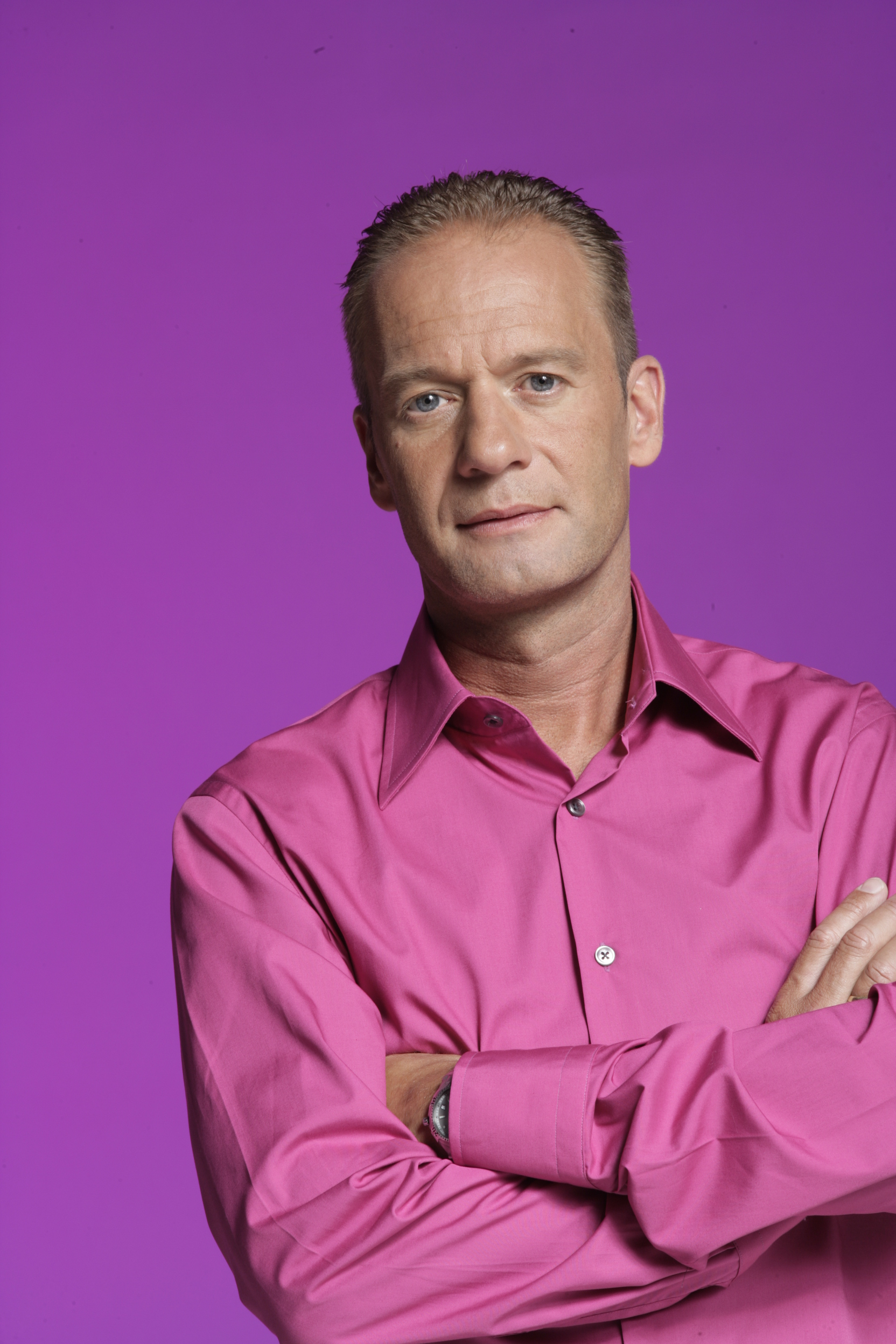
- Born: 12 November 1963 (age 62); Amsterdam, Netherlands
- Occupation: Television presenter
- Relatives: Carlo Boszhard (brother)

Ron Boszhard (born 12 November 1963) is a Dutch television presenter. He is best known for presenting the popular television shows Pluk de Dag, De Leukste Thuis (2000 – 2004) and Te land, ter zee en in de lucht (2007 – 2010).

Boszhard presented the television game show Bommetje! which was later adapted abroad as Cannonball in the United Kingdom and also as Cannonball in Australia. He also presented the second and third season, called Bommetje XL and Bommetje XXL respectively.

== Career ==
In 1996, he made his debut as presenter with the game show Match & Win. Since 2005, he presents the show Zappsport, a sports television show for children. In 2013, he was a contestant in the outdoor competition show Atlas.

Boszhard was one of the Dutch presenters of the television show Spel zonder grenzen (originally called Jeux sans frontières). He also presented the show 1000 seconden in which contestants need to prepare a three course meal in at most 1000 seconds (16 minutes and 40 seconds). He presented the show together with chef Ad Janssen.

In 2018, Boszhard participated in the 18th season of the popular television show Wie is de Mol?. In 2020, he appeared in a special anniversary edition of the show, called Wie is de Mol? Renaissance, which featured only contestants of previous seasons.

In 2019, Boszhard appeared as one of the Twelve Apostles in that year's edition of The Passion, a Dutch Passion Play held every Maundy Thursday since 2011.

Boszhard appeared in the 2023 season of The Masked Singer. Boszhard and Britt Dekker won the Favoriete Zapp duo award at the 2025 Zapp Awards.

== Personal life ==
Carlo Boszhard is his younger brother.

== Selected filmography ==
=== As presenter ===
- Match & Win
- Pluk de Dag
- 2000 – 2004: De Leukste Thuis
- 2005 – present: Zappsport
- 2007 – 2010: Te land, ter zee en in de lucht

=== As contestant ===
- 2013: Atlas
- 2018: Wie is de Mol?
- 2020: Wie is de Mol? Renaissance (anniversary season)
- 2023: The Masked Singer
