= Het Beste Idee van Nederland =

Dutch television show

- Presented by: Jeroen Kijk in de Vegte (2004); Charly Luske (2005); Karlein Nolet (2006); Tooske Ragas (2007–2009); Henkjan Smits (2007–2009); Beau van Erven Dorens (2011); Jochem van Gelder (2014, 2015); Britt Dekker (2014); Airen Mylene (2015)
- Country of origin: Netherlands
- Original language: Dutch

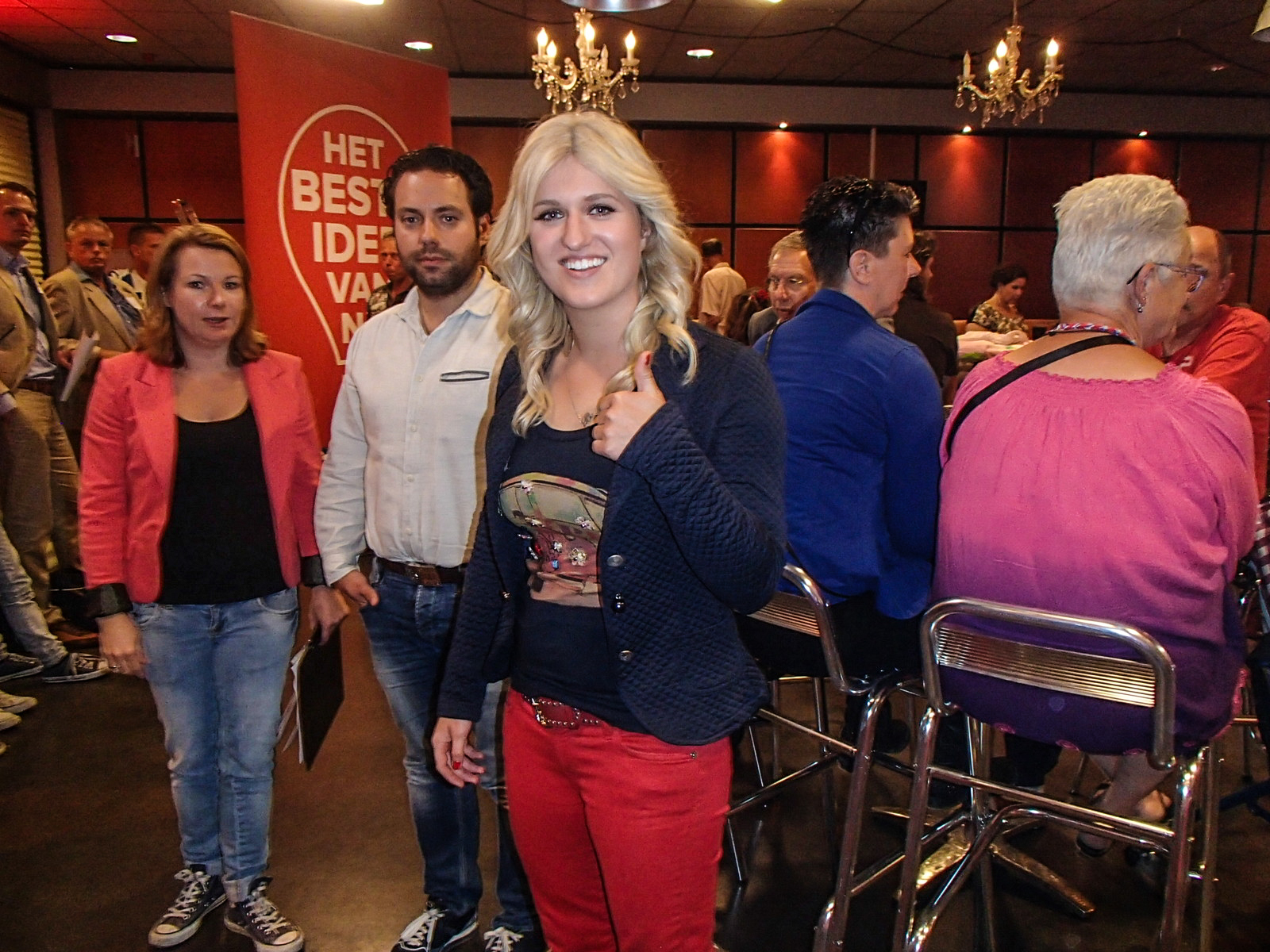
Britt Dekker with a 'Het Beste Idee van NL' poster in the background (2014).

Het Beste Idee van Nederland (Dutch for 'The Best Idea of the Netherlands') is a Dutch television show in which contestants present their inventions to a jury. The winning inventors won a cash prize and their invention was also made available for sale in stores. The show first aired in 2004.

Jeroen Kijk in de Vegte presented the first season of the show in 2004 and Charly Luske presented the second season in 2005. Karlein Nolet presented the third season in 2006. Tooske Ragas and Henkjan Smits also presented the show. Beau van Erven Dorens presented in the show in 2011. In 2014, Jochem van Gelder and Britt Dekker presented the show. Van Gelder also presented in the show in 2015, together with Airen Mylene.

In 2023, Gordon presented the show Wat Een Uitvinding!, a similar show in which inventors also present their ideas to a jury.

== See also ==
- De bedenkers (similar show in Belgium)
