= Nikkie de Jager =

Dutch makeup artist and YouTuber

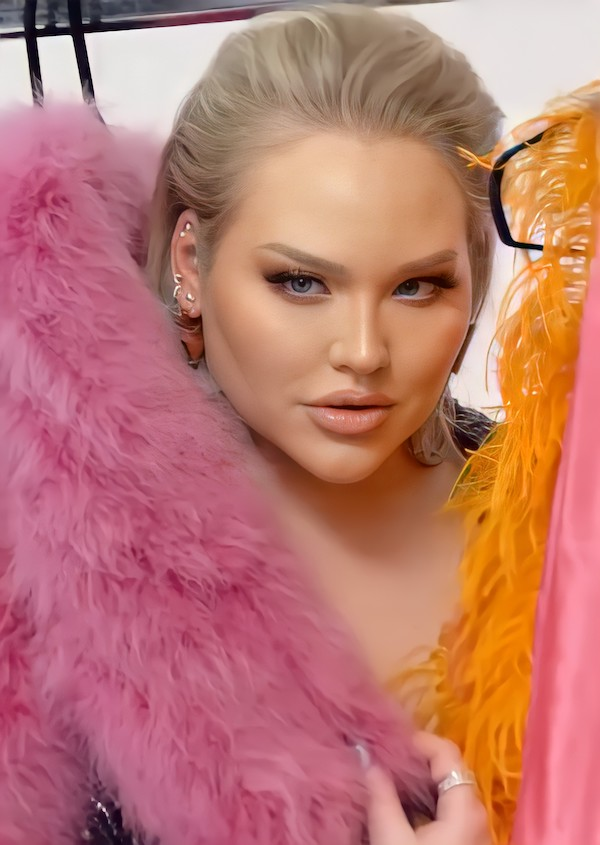
- De Jager in 2020
- Born: 2 March 1994 (age 32); Wageningen, Netherlands
- Other name: NikkieTutorials
- Occupations: Beauty vlogger; makeup artist; model
- Spouse: Dylan Drossaers (m. 2022)

YouTube information
- Channel: NikkieTutorials
- Years active: 2008–present
- Genres: Vlog; makeup; beauty
- Subscribers: 15 million
- Views: 2.41 billion
- Last updated: 29 March 2026
- Website: nikkietutorials.com

Nikkie de Jager-Drossaers (Dutch pronunciation: [ˈnɪki də ˈjaːɣər drɔˈsaːrs]; born 2 March 1994), better known online as NikkieTutorials, is a Dutch make-up artist, model and beauty YouTuber. She gained online popularity in 2015 after her YouTube video "The Power of Makeup" became popular and inspired many other videos of people showing their faces with and without makeup.

== Career ==
De Jager first began uploading videos to YouTube in 2008, at the age of 14, after watching MTV's The Hills while sick and being inspired by Lauren Conrad's makeup. She then began searching YouTube for tutorials to recreate the look and was inspired to begin creating her own. After uploading videos for about two years, she enrolled in makeup coursework at B Academy in Amsterdam. She then signed to Colourfool Agency in 2011, and began working as a professional makeup artist.

In the autumn of 2013, she became the head makeup artist for the RTL 5 show I Can Make You a Supermodel with Paul Fisher. De Jager left Colourfool Agency at the beginning of 2014 to work as a freelance hair and makeup artist.

Forbes magazine named De Jager one of the top ten beauty "influencers" in 2017. In 2017, she also won the award for "YouTube Guru" at the Shorty Awards and the award for "Choice Fashion/Beauty Web Star" at the Teen Choice Awards.

In 2017, De Jager uploaded a video reviewing a foundation produced by a Prague-based cosmetics brand and spoke about the company using her image, specifically a screenshot from her "The Power of Makeup" video, to sell their products on social media without her permission. She expressed disappointment in the company's actions, feeling they had lied to their followers as she was not wearing any of their products in the photo of her they had used to promote their company.

In January 2019, it was announced that De Jager would serve as the Global Beauty Adviser for Marc Jacobs Beauty. The brand stated in a press release that "in this newly created role, Nikkie will be integrated into the brand’s product development process, as well as share her incredible talent and expertise to expand unique content and artistry around the world on both Marc Jacobs Beauty and her own channels."

On 12 June 2020, it was announced that De Jager would become a goodwill ambassador at the United Nations.

On 23 September 2021, De Jager launched her cosmetic brand, Nimya, after having developed it for three years. The brand featured three products upon launch: Moisturizer/Primer Hybrid, Setting Spray, and Cooling Ice Stick and glow Serum, as well as a minifan to go with the products.

=== Collaborations ===
De Jager has collaborated with beauty brands like OFRA Cosmetics and Maybelline. Her line with OFRA Cosmetics in 2017 included liquid lipsticks and a highlighter palette. In December 2019, she collaborated with Lady Gaga, promoting her makeup brand Haus Laboratories.

In August 2020, De Jager launched her own eyeshadow palette in collaboration with the brand Beauty Bay.

== Personal life ==
On 13 January 2020, De Jager uploaded a YouTube video titled "I'm Coming Out", in which she publicly came out as transgender. She stated that she was being blackmailed by someone who threatened to expose this. She began her transition in her teenage years.

De Jager was engaged to Dylan Drossaers in August 2019. The two got married on 6 September 2022.

On 8 August 2020, De Jager and Drossaers were robbed at gunpoint in their house in Uden. The Dutch police reported one other resident suffering superficial injuries. The police launched an investigation shortly after, and later stated that arrests were made during the investigation.

== Television ==
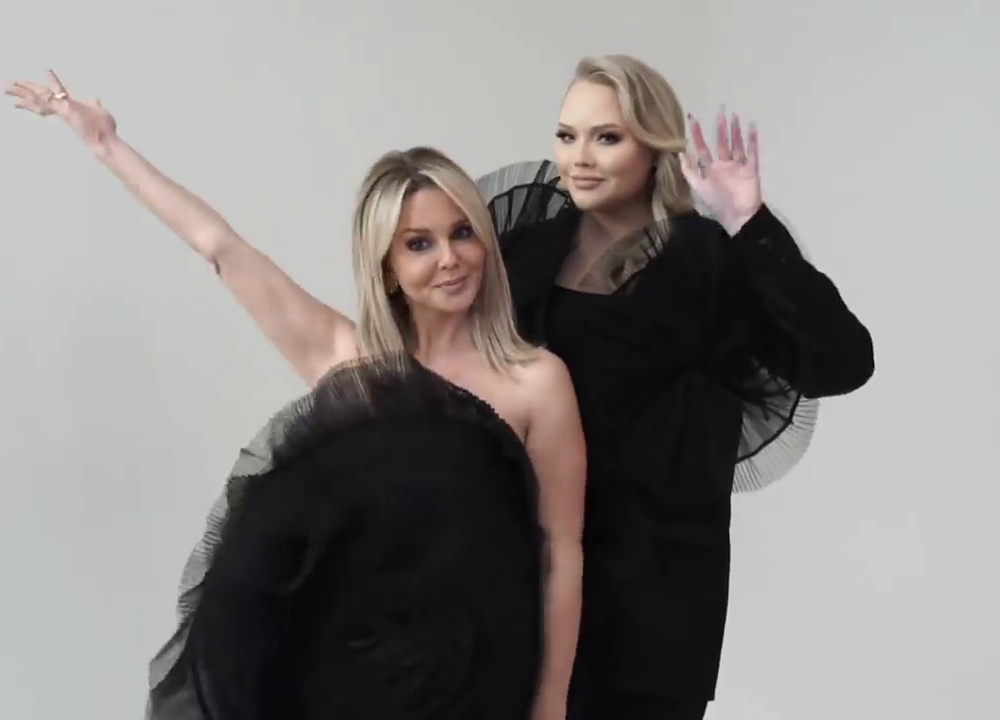
De Jager (right) and Chantal Janzen, two of the four presenters of the Eurovision Song Contest 2021

In September 2017, De Jager was a participant in the Dutch game show The Big Escape. In January 2019, she participated in the nineteenth season of the popular Dutch reality game show Wie is de Mol?. She was eliminated from the competition in the third episode. In 2019, and again in 2024, De Jager also appeared as a guest judge on BBC Three's version of Glow Up. In September 2020, she returned to Wie is de Mol? for a special 20th anniversary season. She went on to become the winner of this season.

After her coming-out video became popular in January 2020, De Jager was a guest on The Ellen DeGeneres Show, where she talked about her experience coming out as transgender. She later spoke out about her experience on the show while being interviewed on De Wereld Draait Door, stating that she was treated differently from other guests, and that the show's host, Ellen DeGeneres, was "cold and distant".

On 10 February 2020, it was announced that De Jager would be the online host of the Eurovision Song Contest 2020, which was planned to be held in Rotterdam. The event was later cancelled due to the COVID-19 pandemic; De Jager subsequently appeared in the replacement show Eurovision: Europe Shine a Light, broadcast on 16 May 2020, where she reported the show's online content live to the public. On 18 September 2020, she was confirmed to return as a co-host of the 2021 contest, having been promoted to regular host from the previous year's role of online host. She was the first transgender person to host the contest.

In September 2020, De Jager was announced as a guest judge on the Drag Race Holland, the Dutch version of RuPaul's Drag Race.

De Jager was intended to be the spokesperson for the Dutch jury in the Eurovision Song Contest 2024. Following the controversial disqualification of the Dutch contestant, Joost Klein, De Jager withdrew from her role, and the Dutch broadcaster AVROTROS opted not to replace her.

| Year | Title | Notes |
|---|---|---|
| 2017 | The Big Escape | 6th Place |
| 2017 | Jachtseizoen | Lost |
| 2019 | Wie is de Mol? | Participant |
| 2019 | Weet Ik Veel | Participant |
| 2019 | Thank You For the Music | Participant |
| 2019 | De TV Kantine | Judge in RuPaul's Drag Race derision |
| 2019 | Glow Up: Britain's Next Make-Up Star | Guest judge |
| 2020 | The Ellen DeGeneres Show | Guest |
| 2020 | Eurovision: Europe Shine a Light | Social media host |
| 2020 | Wie is de Mol? | Participant, winner (20th anniversary season) |
| 2020 | Drag Race Holland | Guest judge, 2 episodes |
| 2021 | Make-Up Cup | Presenter and judge |
| 2021 | Glow Up: The Next Dutch Make Up Star | Presenter and judge |
| 2021 | Eurovision Song Contest 2021 | Presenter together with Chantal Janzen, Edsilia Rombley and Jan Smit |
| 2021–present | Make Up Your Mind | Judge |
| 2023 | Nikkie's Make-Up Mansion | Presenter and judge |
| 2023 | Eurosong 2023 | Judge |
| 2024 | Glow Up: Britain's Next Make-Up Star | Guest judge |

== Awards and nominations ==
| Year | Title | Award | Nominated work | Result | Ref. |
|---|---|---|---|---|---|
| 2017 | 9th Annual Shorty Awards | YouTube Guru | Herself | Won | |
| 2017 | Teen Choice Awards | Choice Web Star: Fashion/Beauty | Herself | Won | |
| 2017 | American Influencer Awards | International Makeup Influencer of the Year | Herself | Won | |
| 2018 | E! People's Choice Awards | The Beauty Influencer of 2018 | Herself | Nominated | |
| 2018 | Teen Choice Awards | Choice Fashion/Beauty Web Star | Herself | Nominated | |
| 2019 | Teen Choice Awards | Choice Fashion/Beauty Web Star | Herself | Nominated | |
| 2019 | E! People's Choice Awards | The Beauty Influencer of 2019 | Herself | Nominated | |
| 2019 | Streamy Awards | Branded Content: Video | NikkieTutorials x Snoop Dogg (by Marc Jacobs Beauty) | Won | |
| 2019 | American Influencer Awards | International Makeup Influencer of the Year | Herself | Won | |
| 2020 | CelebMix Awards | Social Media Star | Herself | Won | |
| 2020 | American Influencer Awards | International Makeup Influencer of the Year | Herself | Won | |
| 2020 | E! People's Choice Awards | The Beauty Influencer of 2020 | Herself | Nominated | |
| 2021 | Nickelodeon Kids' Choice Awards | Favorite Star - Netherlands | Herself | Won | |
