= Thomas Cammaert =

Flemish actor

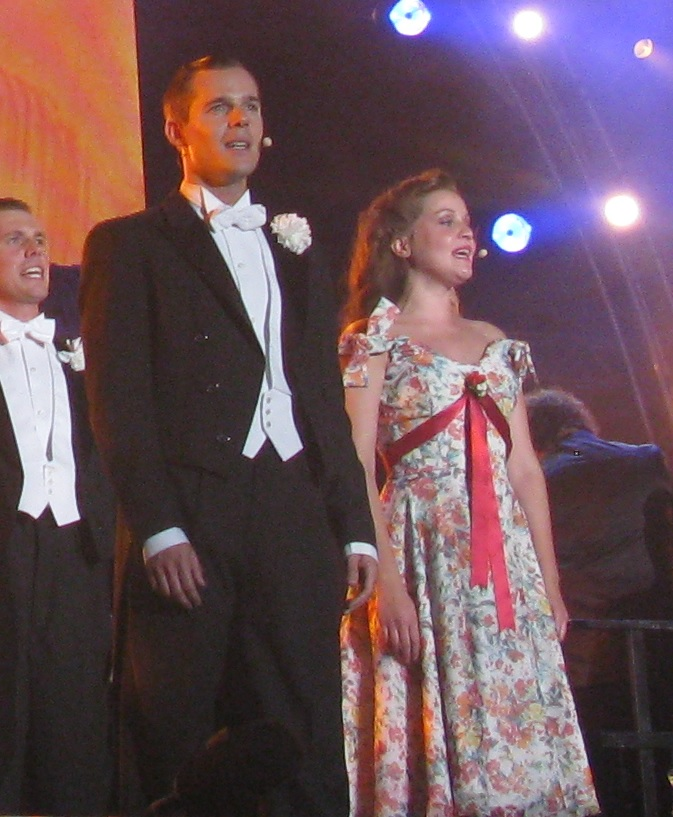
- Cammaert (left) in 2015
- Occupation: Actor

Thomas Cammaert (born 25 April 1984) is an actor and singer.

Cammaert appeared in the 17th season of the television show Wie is de Mol?. He was the Mole of this season of the show. Sanne Wallis de Vries correctly identified Cammaert as the Mole and Jochem van Gelder finished in second place. In 2019, he was a contestant in the Dutch television show Dance Dance Dance.

In 2022, he played the role of Peter in The Passion, a Dutch Passion Play held every Maundy Thursday since 2011. In that same year, Cammaert and Dutch actor Soy Kroon played in the stage play Trompettist in Auschwitz, a play based on the true story of trumpet player Lex van Weren who survived his stay in the Auschwitz concentration camp during World War II.

Cammaert appeared in the third season of the television show De Verraders.

Cammaert and Soy Kroon played roles in the 2026 musical Soldaat in Verzet.

== Filmography and musicals ==
=== Musicals ===
- Soldier of Orange

=== As contestant ===
- Wie is de Mol? (2017)
- Dance Dance Dance (2019)
- De Verraders (2023)
