= Quinty Trustfull =

Dutch presenter / journalist

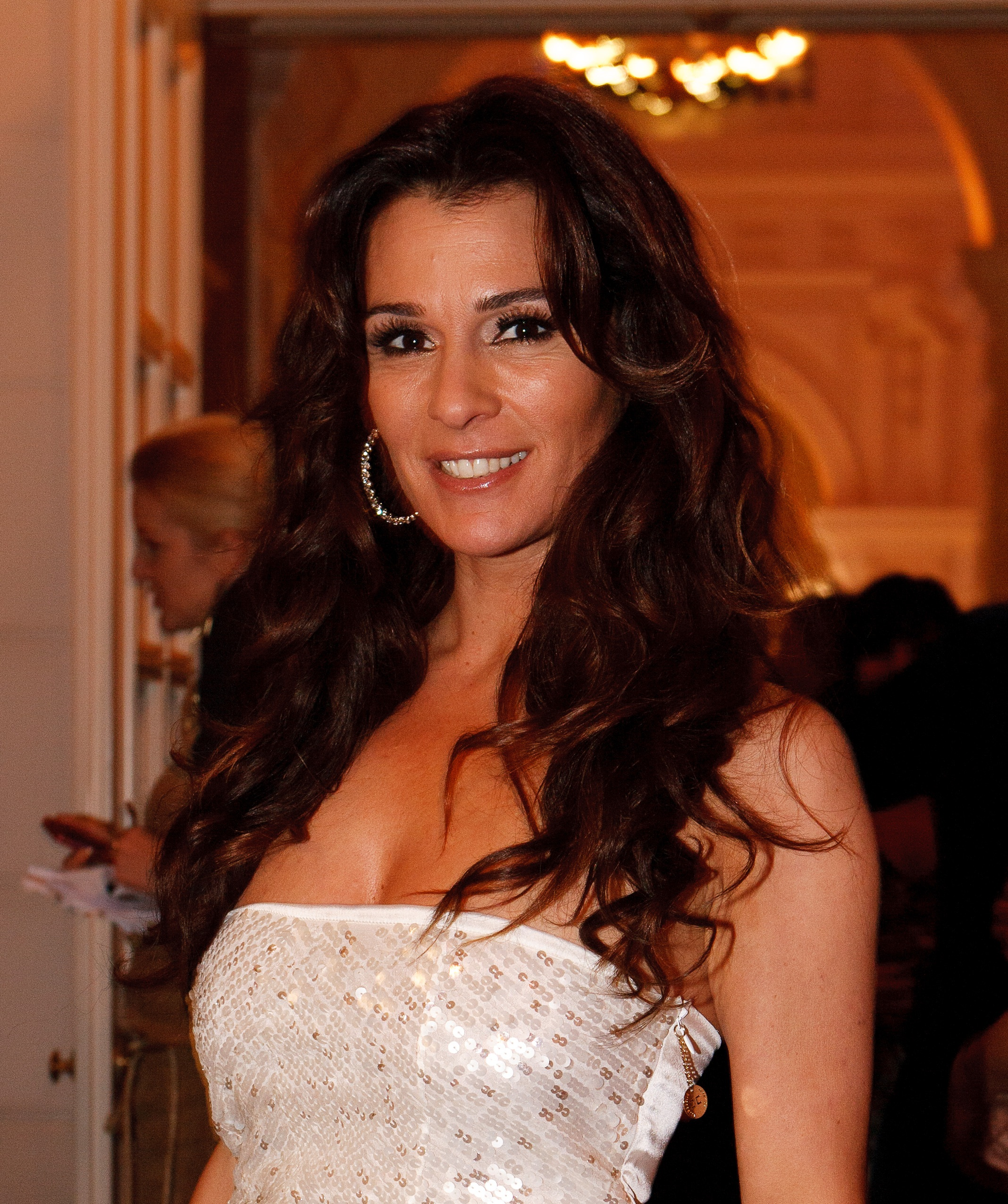
- Trustfull in 2010
- Born: Quinty van den Broek; Amsterdam, Netherlands
- Years active: 1993–present
- Spouse: Orlando Trustfull (m. 1994)
- Children: 3

Quinty Regina Trustfull-van den Broek is a Dutch actress, television presenter and former model.

== Career ==
Trustfull began modeling in 1993 and simultaneously began working as a television and radio presenter at Veronica Broadcasting Organization. In 1995 she received her first role as a presenter for the Dutch national Lottery show Nationale Teleloterij. She has since continued her work presenting numerous popular dutch television program. Some of her most notable work came from her work in Eigen Huis & Tuin a Dutch home improvement show and the Dancing on Ice Dutch franchise.

In 2014 she starred in the Dutch television film Assepoester: een modern sprookje.

== Personal life ==
In 1994 she married footballer Orlando Trustfull and the couple have two children Moïse born 1995 and Kayne born 1998.

== Filmography ==
Year	Work	Role	Notes
1995	National Telelotery	Herself, presenter	
1996	Veronica's Foot Folley		
1998	Baby TV		
2000– 2002	Wannahaves		
2001– 2002	TV Woonmagazine		
2002	Your Own Dream Home		
2002	Money Makers		
2003	Eneco Radiant Netherlands		
2004– 2005	At Home in the Netherlands		
2004– 2005	The 25		
2005	Race Against the Clock		
2005	The Best Idea of the Netherlands		
2006– 2008	House Vision		
2006, 2008– 2015	Own House & Garden		
2007	Dancing on Ice		
2009	Battle of the Stars		
2009– 2012	I'm going to eat with you		
2009	Let's Dance		
2010– present	Coffee time!		
2012– 2013	A Cause of Flowers		
2017– present	5 Hours Live		
2024	K3 en Het Lied van de Zeemeermin	Queen Mira	
