= Peggy Vrijens =

Dutch actress (born 1976)

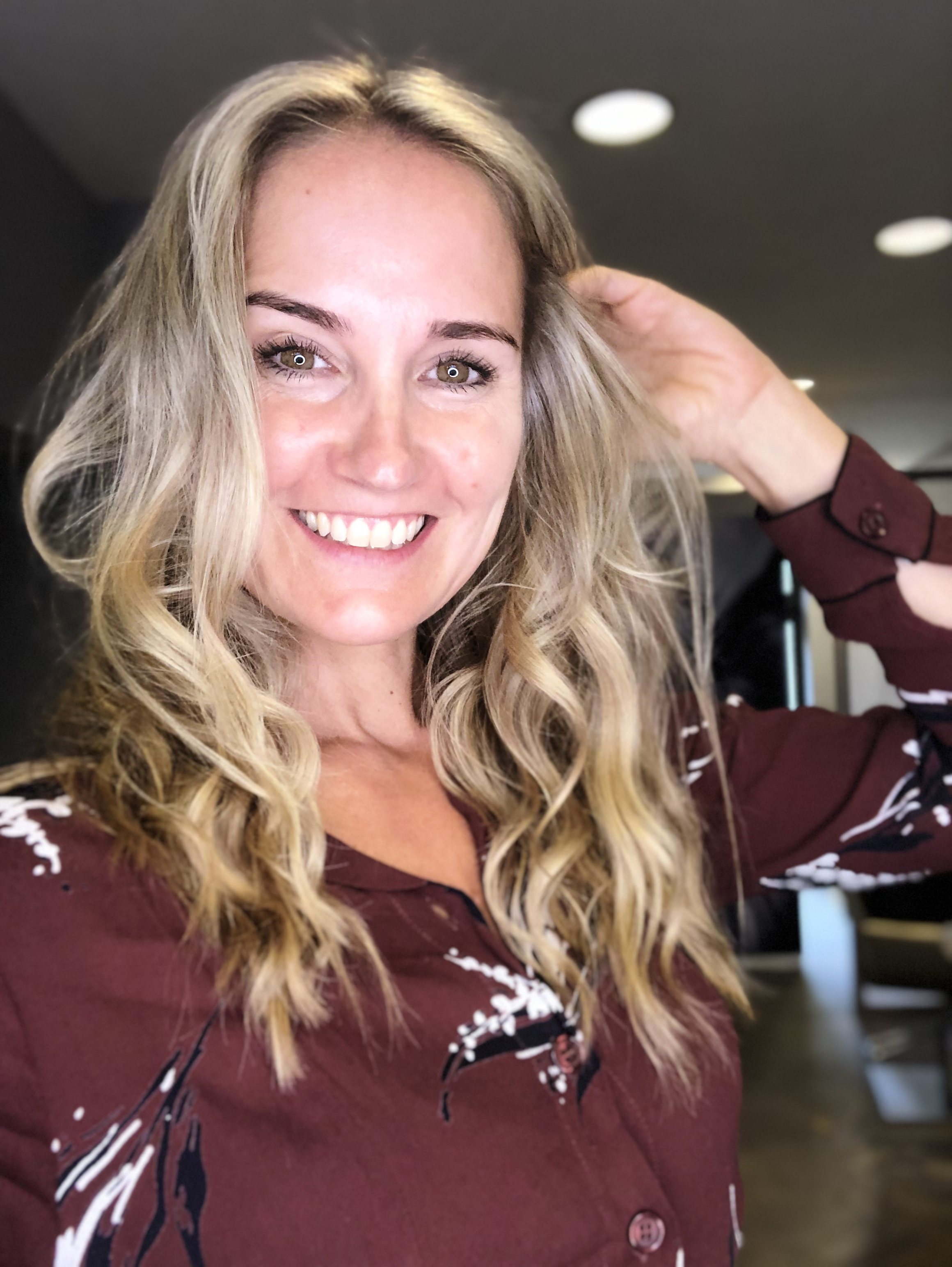
- Born: 28 October 1976 (age 49); Maastricht, Netherlands
- Education: Toneelacademie Maastricht
- Occupation: Actress
- Website: www.peggyvrijens.nl

Peggy Vrijens (born 28 October 1976) is a Dutch actress. She is known for her work in television, film, theatre, and voice acting, as well as her appearances in several Dutch reality shows.

== Career ==
Vrijens played a role in the television series Rozengeur & Wodka Lime (2001 – 2002), Costa! (2005) and Voetbalvrouwen (2007 – 2010). She also played the role of Morgan le Fay in several episodes of the television series Het Huis Anubis en de Vijf van het Magische Zwaard (2011).

In 2005, Vrijens played the role of Joy in the film Joyride.

In 2006, she participated in the popular television show Wie is de Mol?. In 2020, she appeared in a special anniversary edition of the show, called Wie is de Mol? Renaissance, which featured only contestants of previous seasons.

Vrijens appeared in the 2021 film Liefde Zonder Grenzen.

Using motion capturing, the motions of the character Aloy in the game Horizon Forbidden West were acted by Vrijens.

== Filmography ==
=== Television ===
Year	Title	Role	Notes	Ref.
2001	Dok 12	Pauline	Debut	
2001	Rozenguer & wodka lime	Fleur van Aspen	27 episodes	
2003	Sam Sam	Bianca		

=== As actress ===
- 2004: Snowfever
- 2005: Joyride
- 2021: Liefde Zonder Grenzen

=== As contestant ===
- 2006: Wie is de Mol?
- 2012: Expeditie Robinson
- 2020: Wie is de Mol? Renaissance (anniversary season)
