= Rob Verlinden =

Dutch gardener & TV presenter

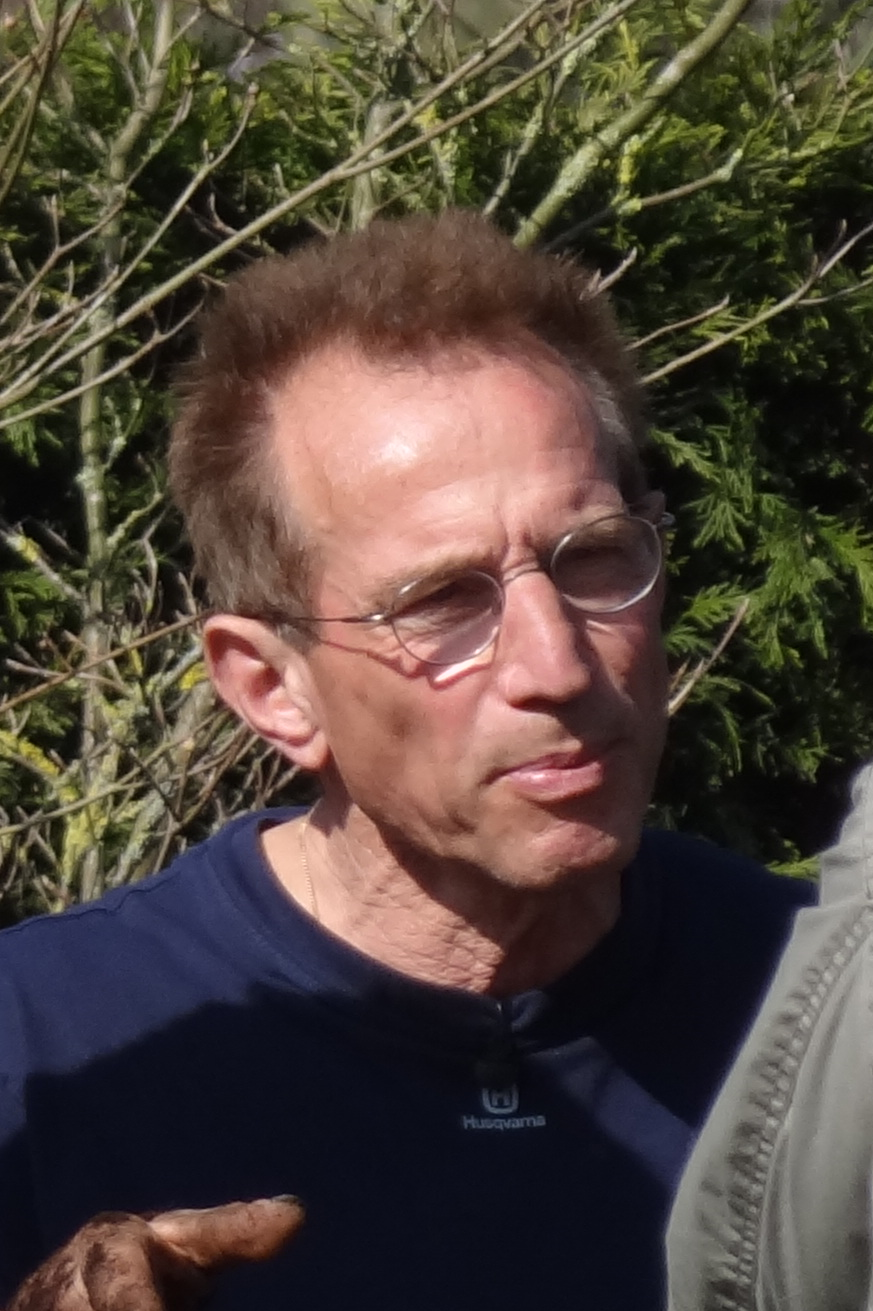
- Verlinden in 2012
- Born: Rob Verlinden; 30 August 1950 (age 75); Laren, Netherlands

Rob Verlinden (Laren, 30 August 1950) is a Dutch gardener, television presenter of gardening shows and writer of several gardening books.

== Biography ==
Verlinden was brought up with gardening and, in 1974, he succeeded his father in the family gardening shop. In 1986, Verlinden started his television career working on the show Avro's Service Salon. In 1992, he switched to RTL 4 and started the program Flora Magazine which was broadcast for two seasons. In 1993/1994, "Flora Magazine" was combined with the do-it-yourself show Eigen Huis (own home), by handyman Nico Zwinkels, into the program Eigen Huis en Tuin (own home and garden). Verlinden and Zwinkels switched to SBS6 in 2004. The program they had planned did however never start, due to Zwinkels being found unfit due to lawsuits against him. Verlinden supported his friend, but eventually decided to continue on his own with a new program De Tuinruimers (the gardencleaners).

Rob also has a weekly column in Tros Kompas and Algemeen Dagblad, and is on the radio every day on the show Meteo Consult tuinweerbericht (Meteo Consult garden weather forecasting ).

== Personal ==
Verlinden was married and has two children and seven grandchildren. He came out during his marriage, which ended in a divorce.

== TV programs ==
- Avro's Service Salon (AVRO, 1986 – 1992)
- Flora Magazine (RTL 4, 1992 – 1993) with Anniko van Santen
- Eigen Huis en Tuin (RTL 4, 1993 – 2004) with Nico Zwinkels
- Robs tuinreizen (RTL 4, 2003)
- Kerst met Rudolph en Rob (RTL 4, 2003 – 2004) with Rudolph van Veen
- De Tuinruimers (SBS6, 2004 – 2010)
- Robs grote tuinverbouwing (SBS6, 2010 – 2018)

== Books ==
- Tuinieren met gevoel (2005)
- De tuinruimers (2006)
