= Jack van Gelder =

Dutch television presenter (born 1950)

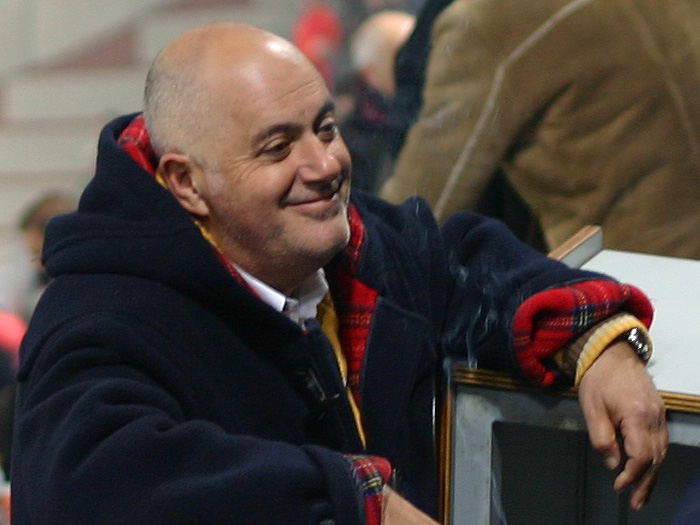
- Born: 27 December 1950 (age 74); Amsterdam, Netherlands
- Occupation(s): Commentator and television presenter

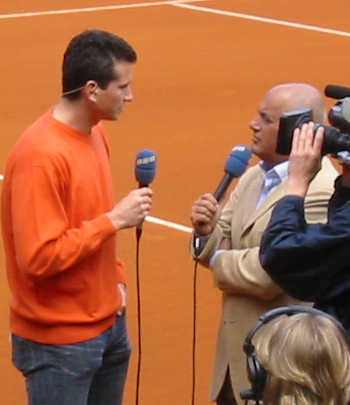
Van Gelder and Richard Krajicek (2004).

Jack van Gelder (Dutch pronunciation: [ˈdʑɛk fɑŋ ˈɣɛldər]; born 27 December 1950) is a Dutch sport commentator and television presenter. He presented many sports television programs of the broadcasting organization NOS, including NOS Studio Sportzomer, NOS Studio Voetbal and NOS Langs de Lijn, for forty years.

== Career ==
Van Gelder began working for TROS in 1972 and for NOS in 1976. He is known for presenting Te land, ter zee en in de lucht from 1984 to 1996. In 2009, he presented the Nationaal Songfestival, an annual competition held almost every year between 1956 and 2012 to select the country's representative for the Eurovision Song Contest.

In 2014, he won the Theo Koomen Award, an annual award for best sports reporting or commentary. He received the award for his commentary of Klaas-Jan Huntelaar's winning goal in the match between Mexico and the Netherlands in the 2014 FIFA World Cup knockout stage.

Van Gelder played the role of Pontius Pilate in the 2014 edition of The Passion, a Dutch Passion Play held every Maundy Thursday since 2011.

He switched from NOS to the sports television service Sport1 in 2015. The service rebranded to Ziggo Sport Totaal later that year. Van Gelder left Ziggo Sport in 2021.

In 2021, Van Gelder was the main guest in an episode of Hoge Bomen presented by Jeroen van der Boom. In the same year, he appeared in the New Year's Eve special of The Masked Singer. He also appears in the 2022 children's film Het Feest van Tante Rita directed by Dennis Bots.

== Personal life ==
In 2013, Van Gelder was decorated Knight in the Order of Orange-Nassau.
