= Eigen Huis & Tuin =

Dutch television program

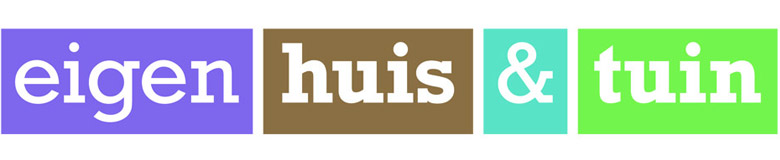
- Genre: Do it yourself
- Starring: Lodewijk Hoekstra, Thomas Verhoef and Quinty Trustfull
- Narrated by: Rob van Dam
- Country of origin: Netherlands
- Original language: Dutch
- No. of seasons: 23

Production
- Running time: 60 Minutes
- Production company: Talpa Media

Original release
- Network: RTL 4
- Release: 1990 – present

Eigen Huis & Tuin (own home and garden) is a Dutch television program about do it yourself related topics. It started in 1990 and is broadcast on Saturday evenings on RTL 4. It has about half a million viewers weekly.

== History ==
In 1990 RTL 4 started the program Eigen Huis ("Own Home"). The show focussed on do-it-yourself work inside and outside the house. The program was hosted by carpenter Nico Zwinkels and presenter Manon Thomas. Nico Zwinkels would show how to do handyman-level DIY work.

At the same time, gardener Rob Verlinden, together with Anniko van Santen (1992/1993) and later Manon Thomas (1993), presented the program Flora Magazine on RTL 4. Gardener Rob Verlinden showed how to create a garden and gave advice on plants and flowers.

From the 1993–1994 season the two programs were combined under the name Eigen Huis & Tuin ("Own Home & Garden"). A typical show starts with a female presenter visiting the men, who are working, and asks them what they are doing that week. She then helps with small things. First to take up this role was Manuëla Kemp. Manuëla left after one year to the Katholieke Radio Omroep and was replaced by Myrna Goossen. Myrna left after one season to be host of her own show, the 5 uur show and her place was taken by Marceline Schopman (1995–1996). Marceline switched to Kindernet and in her place came Irene Moors who presented the program for two years. In season 1998/1999 Irene went on pregnancy leave and Minoesch Jorissen took over the program for one year. However Minoesch was too busy with the program RTL Live. To replace her Myrna Goossen was taken away from SBS6 and presented the program for the next five years (1999–2004).

In 2004 the existing setup ended when gardener Verlinden and handyman Zwinkels left for SBS6. However, because of a sex case against the handyman there was never a program on SBS6. Myrna Goossen also left to focus on the program Aperitivo. Rob Verlinden was later in the SBS6 program De Tuinruimers (the gardencleaners), which later became Robs Grote Tuinverbouwing (Rob's large garden rebuild).

RTL created a new team, consisting of handyman Lodewijk Hoekstra, gardener Thomas Verhoef and female presenter Corine Boon. The voice over of the program is done by Rob van Dam. In April 2008, the role of the female presenter was made smaller and Boon no longer fit the part. Quinty Trustfull took over the part for 2008/2009.

== Format ==
Every week there is a street of the week, for which the inhabitants signed on. In this street Thomas, Lodewijk and Quinty help the people with minor problems around the house. Next to this there are usually two bigger projects that take 3 weeks each. One is a metamorphosis of a garden, which is done by Lodewijk, and Quinty later adds decorations. The other project is done by Thomas, and takes place inside. He changes a room, which is usually a bedroom or a sleeping room. Every week Quinty also shows the viewers ideas on what can be done with the interior.

== Presentation ==
The handyman

- Nico Zwinkels (1990-2004)
- Thomas Verhoef (2004–present)
- Miranda Leijstra (2015–2016)

The gardener

- Rob Verlinden (1990-2004)
- Lodewijk Hoekstra (2004–present)
- Tom Groot (2015–present)

The presenter

- Manon Thomas (1992-1993) (Eigen Huis: 1990-1993 & Flora Magazine: 1993)
- Anniko van Santen (Flora Magazine: 1992/1993)
- Manuëla Kemp (1993-1994)
- Myrna Goossen (1994-1995, 1999-2004)
- Marceline Schopman (1995-1996)
- Irene Moors (1996-1998)
- Minoesch Jorissen (1998-1999)
- Corine Boon (2004-2008)
- Quinty Trustfull (2006, 2008–2015)
- Froukje de Both (2015–2016)
- Evelyn Struijk (2015–present)

== Eigen Huis & Tuin Event ==
From 7 till 10 June 2007 the first edition of Eigen Huis & Tuin Event took place in Jaarbeurs Utrecht in Utrecht. The event is a Do it yourself event about living, DIY and gardening.
