= Te land, ter zee en in de lucht =

Dutch television show

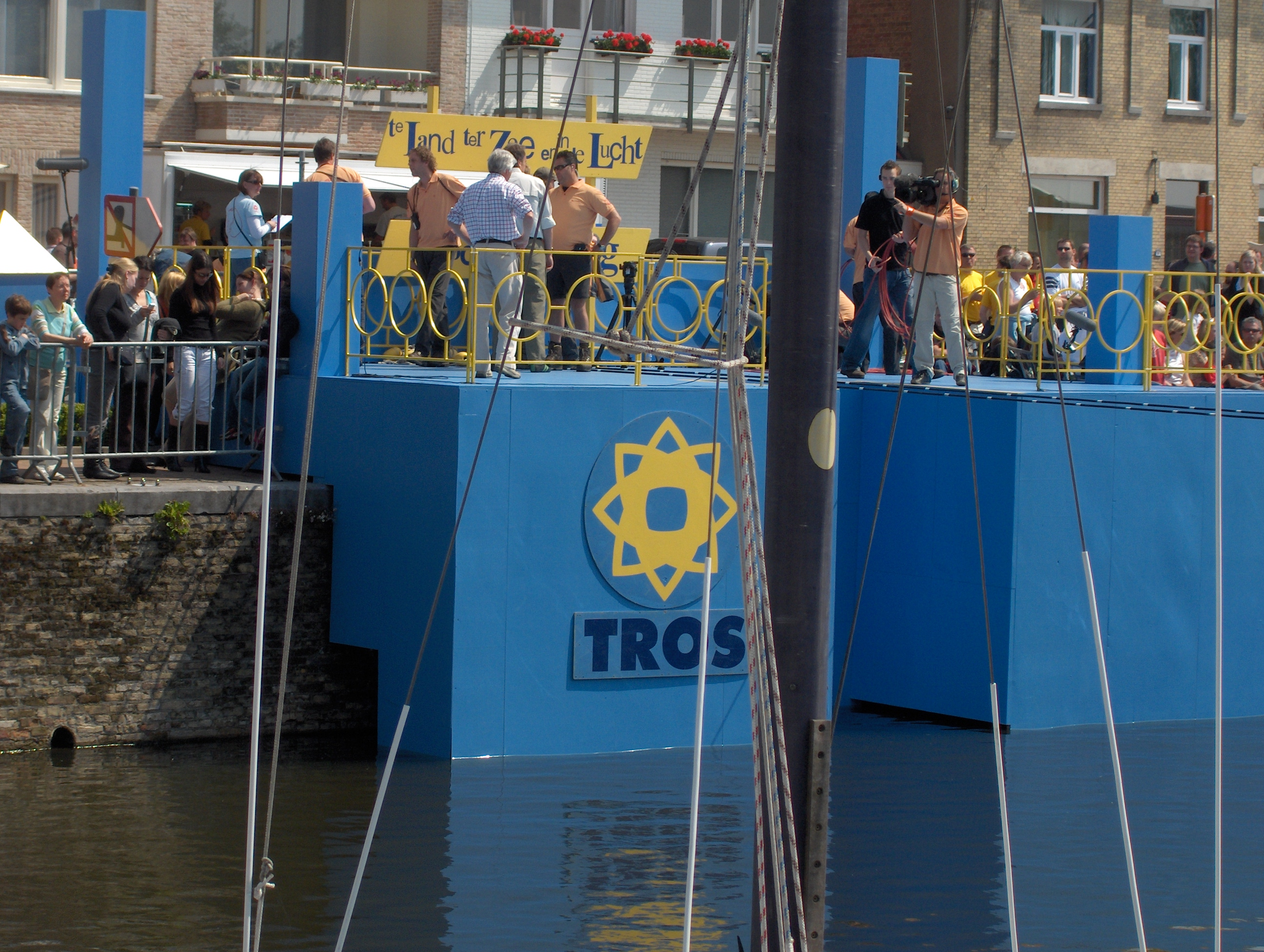
- Te land, ter zee en in de lucht recording in Veurne, Belgium.
- Also known as: Vlieg er eens uit
- Genre: Amusement
- Created by: René Stokvis
- Presented by: amongst others Joost den Draaijer; André van Duin; Tom Blom; Jack van Gelder; Ron Boszhard
- Country of origin: Netherlands
- Original language: Dutch
- No. of seasons: 37

Production
- Running time: 75 minutes (1973–1977); 50 minutes (1978–2011)
- Production company: René Stokvis Producties

Original release
- Network: Nederland 1
- Release: 22 June 1973 – 13 August 2011

Te land, ter zee en in de lucht (On land, at sea and in the air) was the longest-running general amusement television show and game show of the Netherlands, originally broadcast by TROS.

The birdman rally-themed show was initially branded as Vlieg er eens uit - a pun on the two sayings "ga er eens uit" ("go on holiday") and "uitvliegen" ("leave the nest") - between 1973 and 1977. From 1978 onwards, the show started to expand, adding new competition elements and rotating between cities. Until its end in 2011, it was one of the most popular television productions on the public broadcaster.

== History ==
Polygoonjournaal on the second edition of Vlieg er eens uit in 1974.

=== 1973–1977: Vlieg er eens uit ===
In April 1973, TROS, in collaboration with producer René Stokvis, launched a televised competition called Vlieg er eens uit. In this competition, participants were asked to try to break the world record in world's longest human flight. The competition's main prizes were a holiday and the possibility to get a pilot's license. The show was supposed to produce just one episode, recorded in Enkhuizen, which was to be aired on 22 June 1973 on Nederland 1, featuring people jumping of a six metres tall tower in the harbour of that town. The show failed in its objective completely, as all of the just fifteen contestants fell down in the water quite quickly with its winner noting a time of 1.82 seconds.

However, already during the first production, the TROS stated their interest to produce a second edition. The production company sold television rights for the show to Germany, Belgium and Switzerland in 1974, creating a possible audience of up to twenty million viewers. During the show's third edition, there was a preference for serious entrants, as opposed to people trying for fun.

In 1976, the show introduced a new show element in which participants had to walk on the water through harbour as quickly as possible. In 1977, fellow public broadcaster AVRO established "De badkuiprace" ("The bathtub race") as a third competition, which was shot in Hoorn as opposed to Enkhuizen.

=== 1978–2008, 2011: Te land, ter zee en in de lucht ===
In 1978, the show was expanded and rebranded it to Te land, ter zee en in de lucht. As opposed to being an annual event, it was decided that the show would be recorded in different cities, introducing new show elements such as "Tobbedansen", "Fiets 'm d'r in" and "Achteruitrijden". In this form, the show focused less on technology and records, and more on general entertainment with prizes for the most well-crafted vehicles and most unlucky contestants alongside the most successful participant. Willem van Kooten, who had hosted the show under the alias of Joost den Draaijer, was succeeded by actor and comedian André van Duin. As a result of this transformation, creating opportunity for more people to participate, the programme stayed popular throughout the following decades with host Jack van Gelder becoming especially popular among the crowd and with an estimated 2 million viewers per episode in 1993.

In early 2009, TROS announced that it was cancelling Te land, ter zee en in de lucht due to time shortage in their broadcast schedules. In 2011, the series was revived for a new season, but was less popular than before. Its last episode scored less than one million viewers and the series was not renewed.

=== 2023: 50th anniversary specials ===
In the summer of 2023, four special episodes were broadcast by AVROTROS to celebrate the show's 50th anniversary. These special episodes included compilations of clips from the show throughout its history and interviews with fans, former presenters and contestants of the show.

=== 2024: Revival and move to RTL ===
In February 2024, Dutch comedian and television presenter Ruben Nicolai announced that the show will be revived after 13 years in the summer of 2024 and that he will be presenting it. He also announced that the show will be moving to RTL after being broadcast by TROS for 38 years. On 7 May, RTL announced that Gerard Joling would be presenting the show alongside Nicolai.

== Reception ==
=== Initial critical response ===
Its first edition was heavily parodied by Dutch press, with several publications jokingly calling the show "Plons er eens in" ("Dive into it"), due to the competition's largely unsuccessful participants. It was quickly dubbed as "uncomplicated amusement".

=== Societal impact ===
In 1973, during the show's first edition, several thousand locals gathered around the harbour of Enkhuizen to watch the recording. A year later, the local government of Enkhuizen decided to close all schools on the recording day of the second edition as many students had played truant during the recording a year prior. In 1975, Leeuwarder Courant reported that the recording had attracted 25.000 visitors. During a recording of the show's most popular competition "Achteruitrijden" on Circuit Zandvoort, a total of 40.000 visitors were present, which led to safety concerns.

== Accidents ==
In 1976, an entrant of the show broke his leg while trying to test out his self-made plane at home. During a recording in 1991, Te land, ter zee en in de lucht veteran contestant Johan Vlemmix forgot to let go of a rope on time, was launched into the air and fell down eight metres on the ice of the Vechtsebanen.

== Personnel ==
=== Presenters and narrators ===
Season	First presenter	Second presenter	Narrators	Notes
1973	Willem van Kooten	No second presenter	No narrator	Under pseudonym Joost den Draaijer
1974	Willem van Kooten	No second presenter	No narrator	Under pseudonym Joost den Draaijer
1975	Willem van Kooten	No second presenter	No narrator	Under pseudonym Joost den Draaijer
1976	Willem van Kooten	No second presenter	No narrator	Under pseudonym Joost den Draaijer
1977	Willem van Kooten	No second presenter	No narrator	Under pseudonym Joost den Draaijer
1978	André van Duin	No second presenter	Dhr. Vreugdevol	
1979	André van Duin	No second presenter	Dhr. Vreugdevol	
1980	Rijk de Gooyer	No second presenter	Karel van Cooten	
1981	Ron Brandsteder	Wim Bosboom	Ron Brandsteder & Wim Bosboom	
1982	Ron Brandsteder	Wim Bosboom	Ron Brandsteder	
1983	Tom Mulder	Tom Blom	Tom Blom	
1984	Jack van Gelder	No second presenter	Tom Blom	
1985	Jack van Gelder	No second presenter	Tom Blom	
1986	Jack van Gelder	Tom Blom	Tom Blom	
1987	Jack van Gelder	Tom Blom	Tom Blom	
1988	Jack van Gelder	No second presenter	Tom Blom	
1989 (winter)	Martin Gaus	Tetske van Ossewaarde	Tom Blom	
1989 (summer)	Jack van Gelder	No second presenter	Jack van Gelder	
1990	Jack van Gelder	No second presenter	Jack van Gelder	
1991	Jack van Gelder	No second presenter	Jack van Gelder	
1992	Jack van Gelder	Nada van Nie	Jack van Gelder	
1993	Jack van Gelder	Jeroen Kramer	Jack van Gelder	
1994 (winter)	Jack van Gelder	Jeroen Kramer	Jack van Gelder	
1994 (summer)	Jack van Gelder	Simon van der Ben	Jack van Gelder	
1995	Jack van Gelder	Jurre Bosman	Jack van Gelder	
1996	Jack van Gelder	No second presenter	Jack van Gelder	
1997	Rob Fruithof	No second presenter	Rob Fruithof	
1998	Bert Kuizenga	No second presenter	Jack van Gelder	
1999	Bert Kuizenga	Nova van Dijk	Jack van Gelder	
2000	Bert Kuizenga	Nance	Tom Blom	
2001	Bert Kuizenga	Nance	Tom Blom	
2002	Bert Kuizenga	Nance	Tom Blom	
2003	Bert Kuizenga	Nance	Tom Blom	
2004	Bert Kuizenga	No second presenter	Tom Blom	
2005	Bert Kuizenga	No second presenter	Tom Blom	
2006	Bert Kuizenga	No second presenter	Tom Blom	
2007	Ron Boszhard	Angela Esajas	Tom Blom	
2008	Ron Boszhard	Angela Esajas	Tom Blom	
2011	Ron Boszhard	No second presenter	Tom Blom	
2024	Ruben Nicolai	Gerard Joling	Edwin Evers	

== Gallery of show elements within Te land, ter zee en in de lucht ==
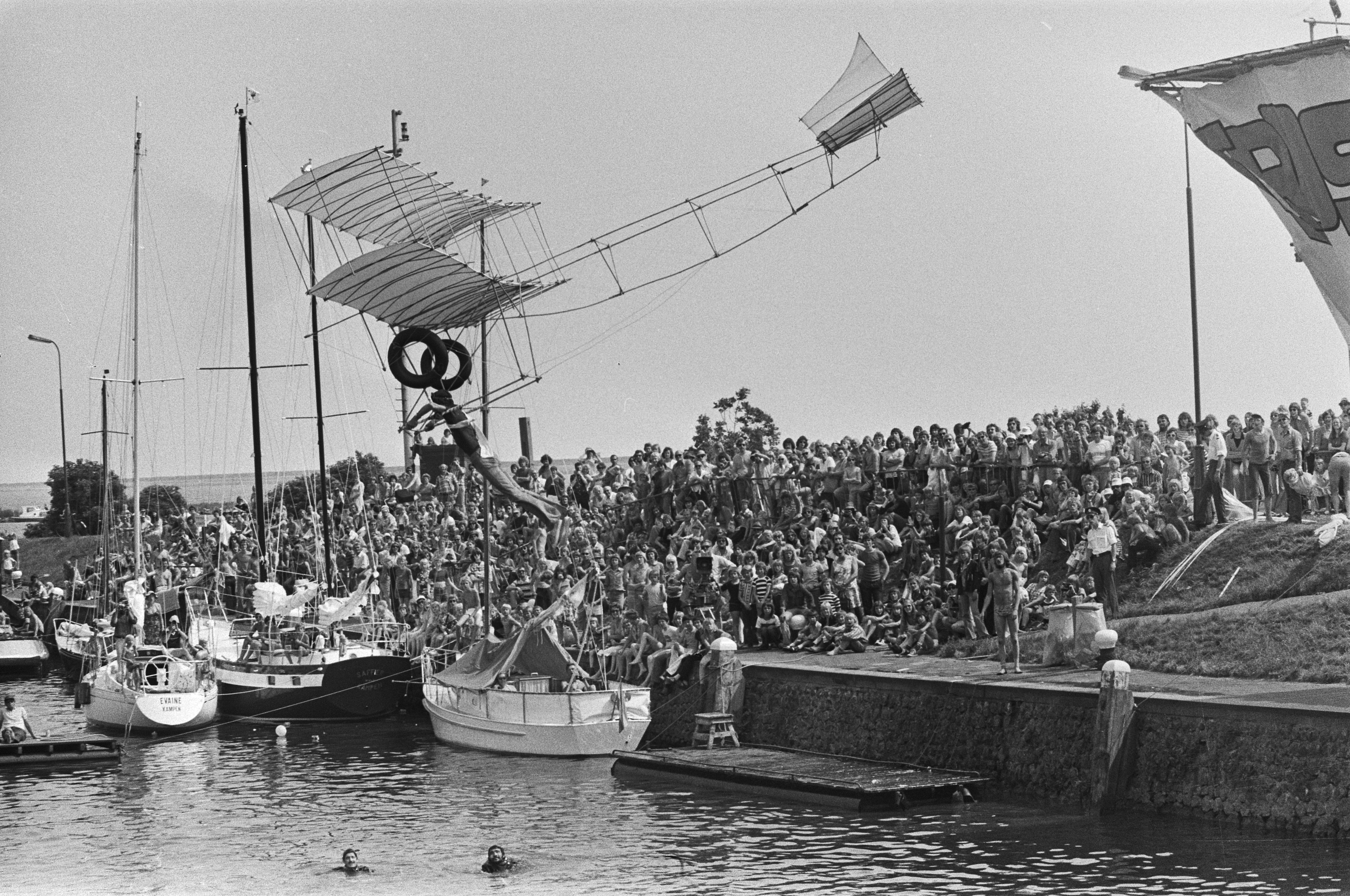
Vlieg er eens uit

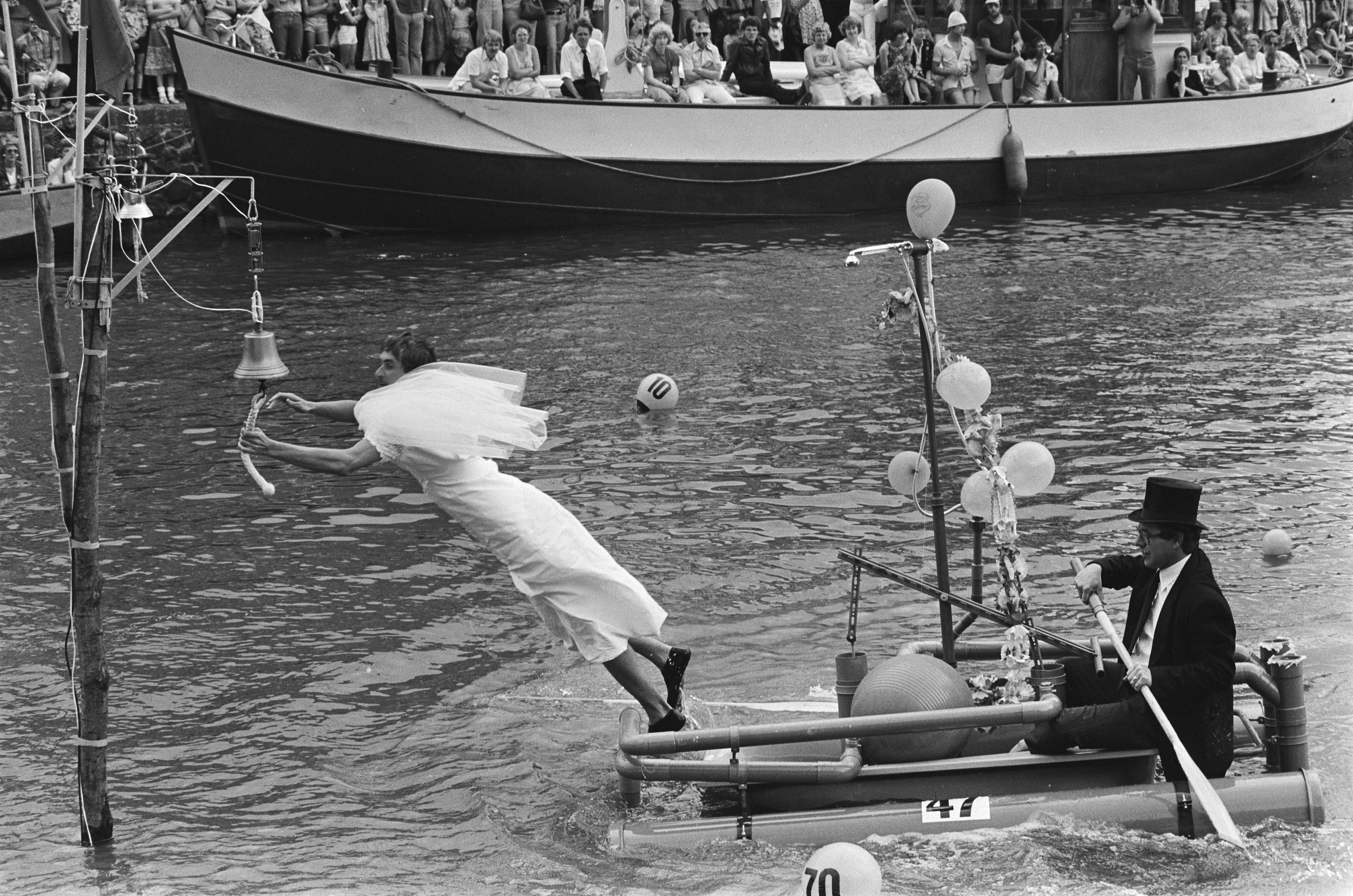
Badkuiprace

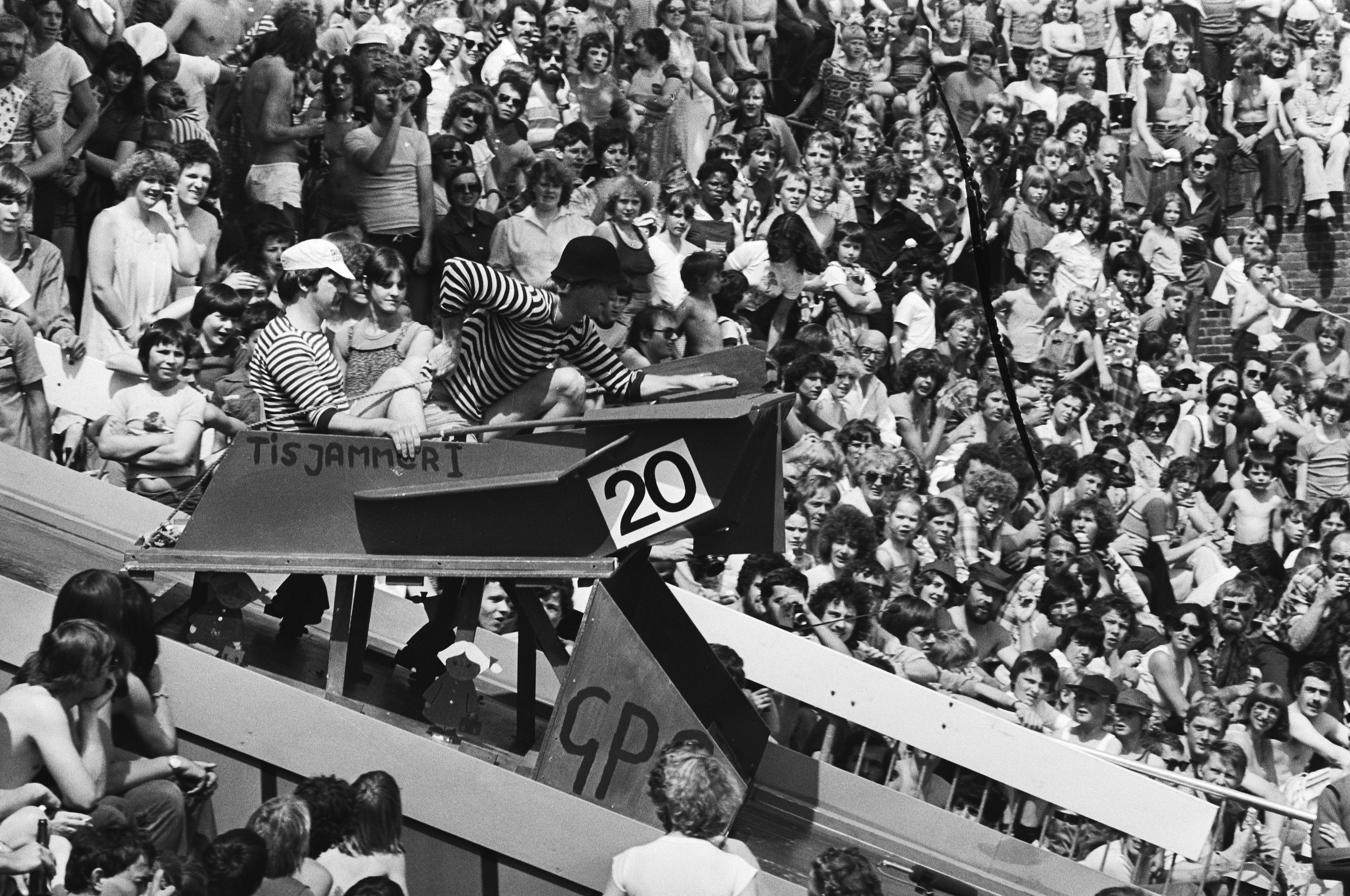
Tobbedansen

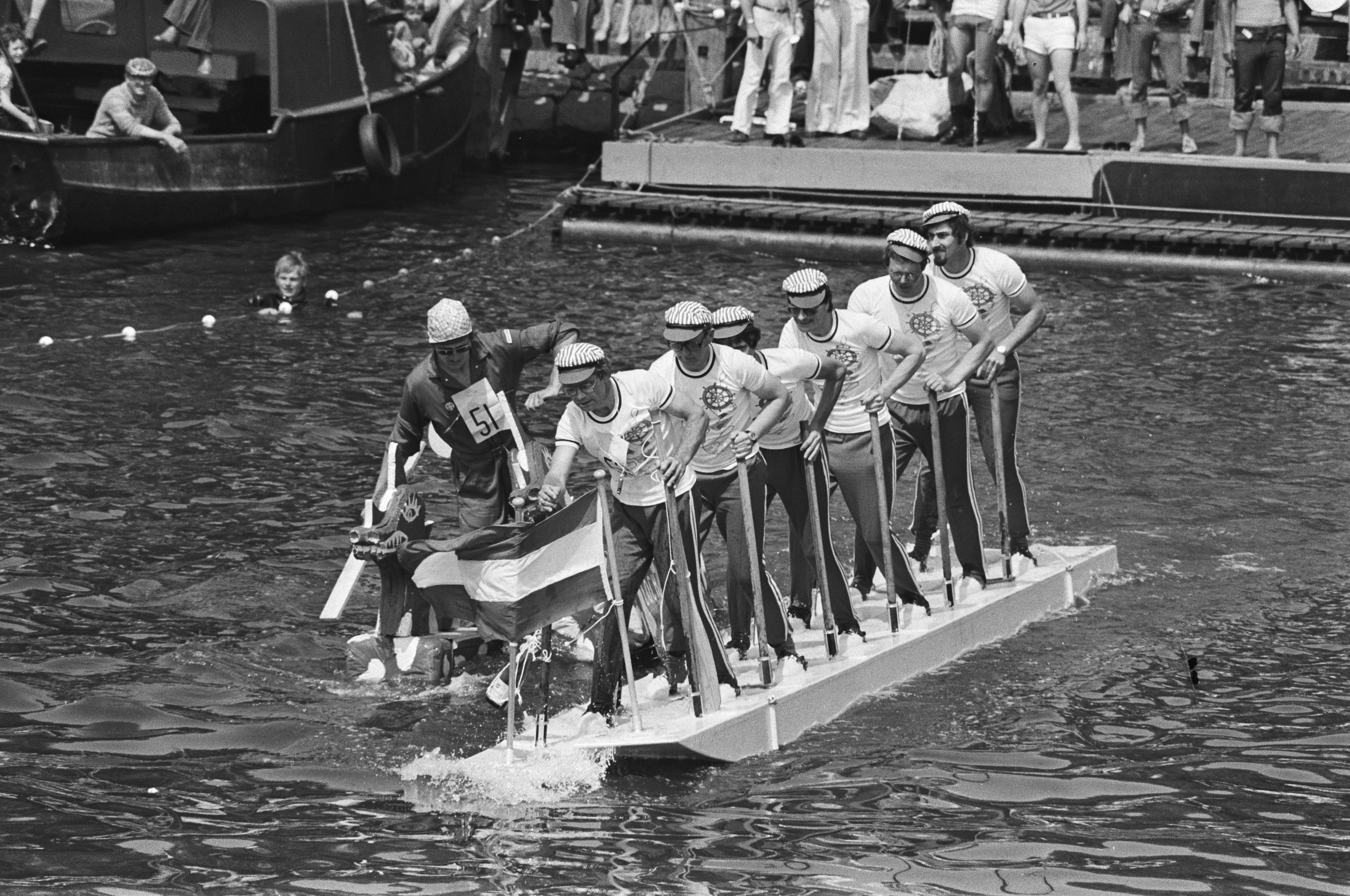
Loop er eens in

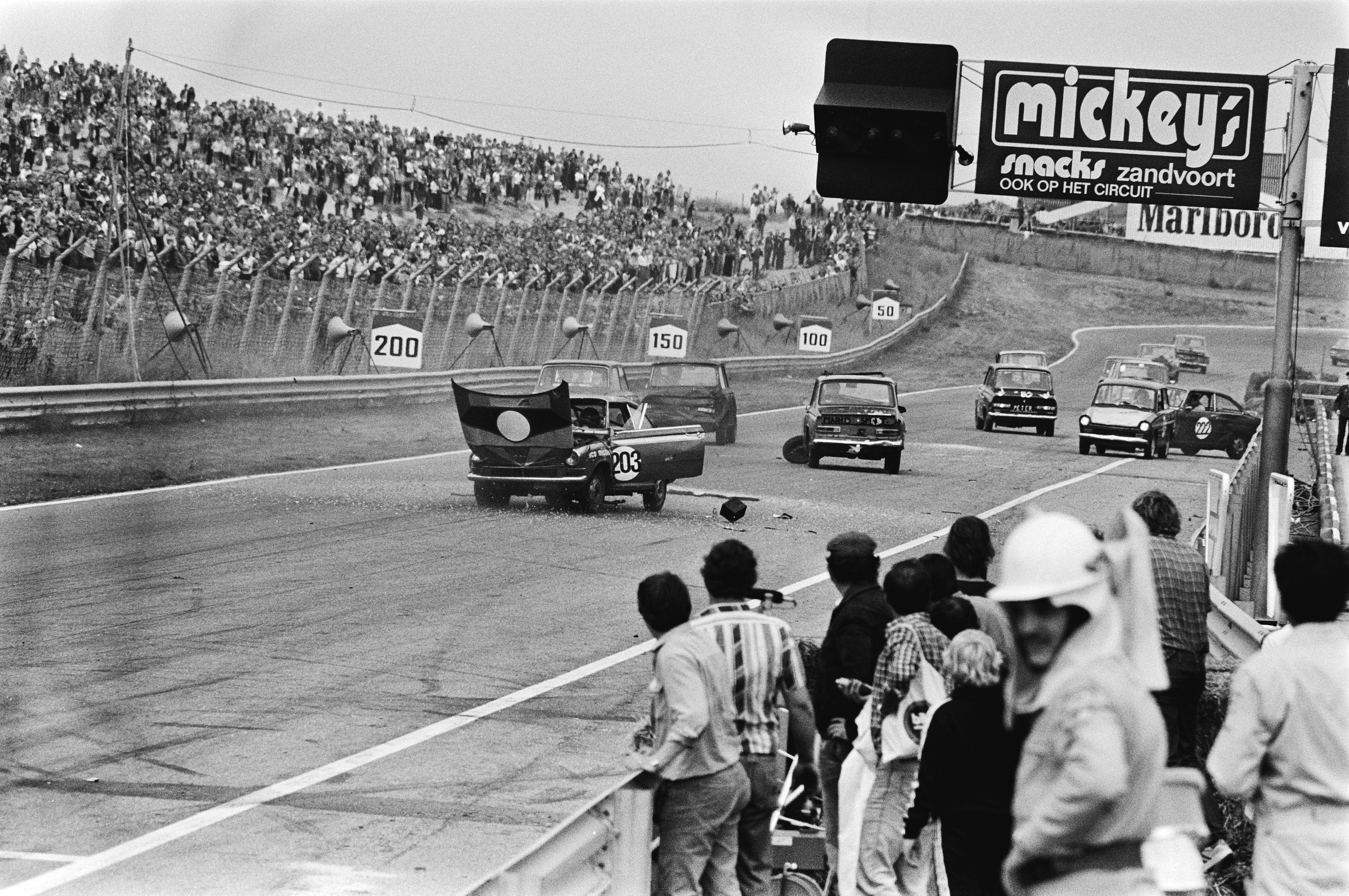
Achteruitrijden
