= Jochem van Gelder =

Dutch television presenter (born 1963)

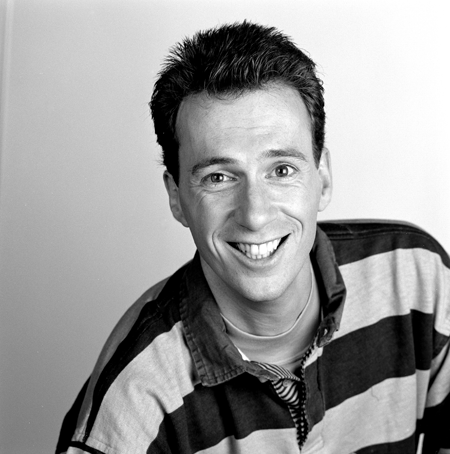
- Van Gelder in 1990
- Born: Joannes Willibrordus Adrianus van Gelder; 23 May 1963 (age 63); Tiel, Netherlands
- Occupation: Presenter

Jochem van Gelder (born 23 May 1963) is a Dutch television presenter. He is known for presenting the television shows Willem Wever, Praatjesmakers and Bonje met de buren. He also presented Het Beste Idee van Nederland and Lachen om Home Video's.

== Career ==
In 1989, he began working for NCRV and he became presenter of the show Disney Club. He also presented the show Willem Wever. From 2000 to 2010, Van Gelder presented the show Praatjesmakers. In the show, he talks to children about everyday topics. He left NCRV in 2010.

He played a role in the 2010 film Ernst, Bobbie en het Geheim van de Monta Rossa. It was his film debut. In 2012, Van Gelder became a presenter for SBS6. He presented the 2013 television show Pas Oplichters, a show about scamming.

In 2014, Van Gelder and Britt Dekker presented the television show Het Beste Idee van Nederland in which contestants present their inventions to a jury. He also presented the television show Lachen om Home Video's, the Dutch version of the show America's Funniest Home Videos. He appeared in a 2015 episode of the game show De Jongens tegen de Meisjes.

Van Gelder was a contestant in the 17th season (2017) of the television show Wie is de Mol?. He reached the final and he finished in second place. In the same year, he presented the television show Later als ik groot ben in which he asks children about their dream job. His SBS6 contract was not renewed in 2017 and, in 2018, he became a presenter for Omroep Gelderland. In the television show Van Gelder VIP Vervoer he talks to Dutch celebrities while driving. He also presents Van Gelders Grijs in which he talks with the elderly about their life and ageing.

Van Gelder competed in the 2022 photography television show Het Perfecte Plaatje in Argentinië. He finished in second place. In May 2025, he hosted two theatre shows based on the television show Praatjesmakers during the Beeld & Geluid Spoelt Terug festival.

== Personal life ==
Van Gelder is a fan of the association football club NEC Nijmegen.

In September 2024, he led the wedding ceremony of Britt Dekker and director Max Apotowski.

== Selected filmography ==
=== As presenter ===
- Willem Wever (1994 – 2000)
- Praatjesmakers (2000 – 2010)
- Alles Kids (2012)
- Pas Oplichters (2013)
- Het Beste Idee van Nederland (2014)
- Kitsch of Kassa (2015)
- Lachen om Home Video's (2015 – 2017)
- Van Gelder VIP Vervoer (2018, 2019)
- Van Gelders Grijs (2018 – present)
- De alarmcentrale: Pech onder de zon (2019)
- De alarmcentrale: Pech onderweg (2020)
- De Gulden Gelderlander (2020 – present)
- Van Hommels tot Ezels (2025)

=== As actor ===
- Ernst, Bobbie en het Geheim van de Monta Rossa (2010)
- De film van Dylan Haegens (2018)

=== As contestant ===
- De Jongens tegen de Meisjes (2015)
- Wie is de Mol? (2017)
- De slimste mens (2017)
- Het Perfecte Plaatje in Argentinië (2022)
- Dit weet jij niet?! (2026)
