= Wie is de Mol? 25th Anniversary season =

Dutch reality television season

- Season 25
- Presented by: Rik van de Westelaken
- No. of contestants: 10
- Winner: Merel Westrik
- Runner-up: Loes Haverkort
- Location: Portugal
- The Mole: Nathan Rutjes
- No. of episodes: 8

Release
- Original network: AVROTROS (NPO 1)
- Original release: November 1 – December 20, 2025

Season chronology
- ← Previous; Season 25: Cambodia Next → Season 26: Tanzania

Wie is de Mol? Anniversary season 2 is a special jubilee season of Wie is de Mol? in celebration of the 25-year anniversary of the series. This is the second jubilee season comprising returning cast members, following Wie is de Mol? Renaissance in 2020.

The season was hosted by Rik van de Westelaken and premiered on 1 November 2025 for a shorter eight-episode season. The season finale saw Merel Westrik (season 19) win the €5,340 prize pot by unmasking Nathan Rutjes (season 20) as the Mole, with Loes Haverkort (season 18) finishing as the runner-up.

== Candidates ==
The season featured ten previous contestants from former seasons. Unlike previous Wie is de Mol? seasons, the cast were not revealed until the season premiere. Ten candidates consisted of five returning former Moles and five returning non-Mole contestants.

Candidate	Occupation	Original season	Result
Merel Westrik	Journalist and presenter	Season 19 (Colombia)	Winner
Nathan Rutjes	Former professional footballer	Season 20 (China)	The Mole
Loes Haverkort	Actress and stage artist	Season 18 (Georgia)	Runner-up
Kim Pieters	Actress	Season 10 (Japan)	3rd place
Anne-Marie Jung	Cabaret artist	Season 12 (Iceland & Spain)	4th place
Jurre Geluk	Presenter	Season 23 (South Africa)	5th place
Sahil Amar Aïssa	Film producer and actor	Season 22 (Albania)	6th place
Dennis Weening	Presenter	Season 8 (Mexico)	7th place
Richard Groenendijk	Comedian and stage artist	Season 6 (Argentina)	8th place
Imanuelle Grives	Actress and writer	Season 17 (United States)	9th place

== Candidate progress ==
The order in which the candidates learned their results are indicated in the table below.

Summary of candidates progress in each episode
Candidate	Episode							
Candidate	1	2	3	4 (Note: During the episode 4 elimination, the first five candidates shown their green screen completed an assignment where they voted on whether or not to let the ceremony continue. A majority voted not to continue the elimination, thereby saving both remaining candidates (Anne-Marie and Sahil).)	5	6	7 (Note: The final four candidates took the final quiz in episode 7. Kim scored the lowest and was eliminated while the remaining three contestants progressed to the finale.)	Finale
Merel	1st			2nd		1st	2nd	Winner
Nathan	exempt		1st	5th	(1)		1st	The Mole
Loes		3rd	2nd	4th				Runner-Up
Kim		2nd		1st			Eliminated	
Anne-Marie		1st		exempt	1st (1)	Eliminated (1)		
Jurre	3rd			3rd		Eliminated		
Sahil	2nd		3rd	exempt	Eliminated (1)			
Dennis			Eliminated					
Richard		Eliminated						
Imanuelle	Eliminated							

For candidates who used Jokers to correct an incorrect answer on a quiz, the amount used are presented in parentheses.

Key
The candidate won the season.
The candidate was revealed as the Mole.
The candidate finished as the runner-up.
The candidate saw a green screen, in the order stated, and therefore proceeded to the next episode.
The candidate did not see a green screen before the eliminated player saw their red screen. Thus they proceeded to the next episode.
The candidate was immune from elimination through an Exemption or other means.
The candidate was eliminated.

== Episodes ==
Episode	Air Date	Title	Amount in Pot (Note: Pot earnings: indicates an increase indicates no change indicates a decrease)	Location	Days	Eliminated
1	November 1, 2025	'Ik ben de Mol' (I Am the Mole)	€0 (Note: For the "Tien Mollen?" assignment held in episode 1, money would be added to or removed from the pot upon confirmation of whether the selected contestant, Nathan, was confirmed as the Mole or not. Nathan was revealed as the Mole in the finale, therefore removing €2,000 at this time. This is reflected in the ongoing pot count.)	Vila Nova de Gaia & Porto	1–2	Imanuelle
2	November 8, 2025	'Een lesje geleerd' (A Lesson Learned)	€0 → €3,700	Vila Nova de Gaia & Lisbon	3–4	Richard
3	November 15, 2025	'Een duister verleden' (A Dark Past)	€3,700 → €5,000	Lisbon	5–6	Dennis
4	November 22, 2025	'Een Prettig Weerzien?' (A Pleasant Reunion?)	€5,000 → €0	Lisbon	6–7	—N/a
5	November 29, 2025	'Het Noodlot' (The Fate)	€0 → €2,000	Lisbon & Sintra	8–9	Sahil
6	December 6, 2025	'Rendez-Vous'	€2,000 → €5,000	Algarve	10–12	Jurre
6	December 6, 2025	'Rendez-Vous'	€2,000 → €5,000	Algarve	10–12	Anne-Marie
7	December 13, 2025	'De Laatste Slag' (The Final Blow)	€5,000 → €7,340	Algarve	13–14	Kim
8 (Finale)	December 20, 2025	'De Finale'	€7,340 → €5,340	Amsterdam, Netherlands	Runner-up	Loes
8 (Finale)	December 20, 2025	'De Finale'	€7,340 → €5,340	Amsterdam, Netherlands	Winner	Merel
8 (Finale)	December 20, 2025	'De Finale'	€7,340 → €5,340	Amsterdam, Netherlands	The Mole	Nathan

== Season summary ==
=== Episode 1 ===
Episode 1 - Ik ben de Mol
Original airdates: 1 November 2025 Location: Vila Nova de Gaia & Porto
Assignment	Money earned	Possible earnings
Een Explosief Begin	€0	€2,500
Tien Mollen? (Note: For the "Tien Mollen?" assignment held in episode 1, the outcome would be revealed upon confirmation of whether the selected candidate, Nathan, was the Mole or not. This is reflected in the ongoing pot count of the season.)	Result revealed in finale	
Current Pot	€0	€2,500
Exemption
Nathan	Tien Mollen?	
Elimination
Imanuelle	1st player eliminated	

'Een Explosief Begin' (An Explosive Beginning)

The five former Moles (Anne-Marie, Dennis, Jurre, Kim and Merel) attempt to complete five puzzles or challenges at the Monastery of Serra do Pilar in order to defuse five paint bombs located in suitcases around Porto. There, they also spin a handle to generate signal from an antenna, which transmits a map of the suitcase locations to phones of the other five candidates.

Meanwhile, the five candidates who were not previously the Mole (Imanuelle, Loes, Nathan, Richard and Sahil) begin at the Episcopal Palace and attempt to find the five suitcases around Porto and bring them to the monastery. However, they are not told the destination and have to figure it out from clues at each suitcase. For each suitcase delivered within 45 minutes, with the paint bomb inside defused, €500 is added to the pot.

'Tien Mollen?' (Ten Moles?)

Each candidate attempts to convince a jury of nine former Wie is de Mol? winners that they are this season's Mole. Additionally, the jury are presented with footage from pre-season where a production member "accidentally" revealed the season's location early, and asked candidates to later pretend they didn’t know about it.

Afterwards, the jury deliberate and select the candidate they believe is the Mole. If the jury are correct, €2,000 is deducted from the pot in the finale. If they are incorrect, €1,000 is added to the pot once confirmed. In both cases, the selected candidate also receives an Exemption.

The jury selected Nathan as their choice for the Mole, thereby awarding him an Exemption.

=== Episode 2 ===
Episode 2 - Een Lesje Geleerd
Original airdates: 8 November 2025 Location: Vila Nova de Gaia & Lisbon
Assignment	Money earned	Possible earnings
Port(o)	€200	€1,500 (Note: Before the "Port(o)" assignment in episode 2, Nathan had the chance to increase the potential earnings to €3,000 by declining to hear information from the Mole briefing, although he did not do so. As a result, the maximum earnings was listed at €1,500 by the show.)
Repetitie	€2,000	€2,500
Resultaatgericht	€1,500	€1,500
Current Pot	€3,700	€8,000
Elimination
Richard	2nd player eliminated	

'Port(o)'

Before the assignment, Nathan (who was voted as the Mole in the last assignment) is given the chance to receive information about the assignment, which the Mole has also been briefed about. If he hears the information, the assignment is worth €1,500, but if he declines, the potential earnings raise to €3,000. Nathan accepted the offer to hear the information.

For the assignment, the group select four candidates to undergo a port wine tasting, and four candidates (plus Nathan who chose his group beforehand) to search a cellar for barrels and bring them to a boat.

The candidates at the cellar attempt to identify five correct barrels among dozens to bring to a boat along the river. The barrels can be determined by hints given by walkie-talkie by former Wie is de Mol? contestant Ellie Lust, some of which require information about the candidates at the wine tasting. For each correct barrel brought to the boat within 30 minutes, €200 is added to the pot.

Meanwhile, the candidates at the wine tasting attempt to memorize information presented by the sommelier, and answer questions from the other group via walkie-talkie when requested to help them identify the barrels. After the tasting, they attempt to identify a 20-year old tawny port from among several glasses of wine to earn €500 for the pot if they are correct.

'Repetitie' (Repetition)

The group select four candidates to undergo a school test. They are taken to a classroom to undergo a five-question chemistry test alongside other "students", in an "exam" which repeats each time the school bell rings. For each question answered correctly by the end, €500 is added to the pot. Meanwhile, the remaining five candidates undergo science experiments in a chemistry lab to obtain the answers for the questions. However, some of the items they need to complete the experiment are located in the classroom, or in possession of the "students".

Each time the bell rings, one candidate from each group can meet in the hallway for one minute to exchange information or items. If candidates fail to return to their respective room in time, they are excluded from the assignment and can no longer help.

'Resultaatgericht' (Result-oriented)

Each candidate sits the elimination quiz simultaneously. However, upon completing question 15 (of 20), candidates' times are paused. Host Rik van de Westelaken then reveals that the candidate with the current lowest score answered that the Mole is a man for the question "Is the Mole a man or a woman?". The group is given the chance to vote on whether to finish the quiz, or to end the quiz early and have the elimination determined only by the first 15 questions - which also adds €1,500 to the pot.

=== Episode 3 ===
Episode 3 - Een Duister Verleden
Original airdates: 15 November 2025 Location: Lisbon
Assignment	Money earned	Possible earnings
Flitsbezorgen	€1,280	€2,000
Vijandig Verleden	€1,020	€3,000
The Line-Up	−€1,000	—N/a
Current Pot	€5,000	€13,000
Elimination
Dennis	3rd player eliminated	

'Flitsbezorgen' (Flash Delivery)

Candidates divide themselves into four candidates to deliver pastel de nata and four candidates who think they can "be flashed".

The candidates who think they can be flashed attempt to activate a flash speed enforcement camera using eight different modes of transport. There are eight different speed detection limits to set the camera at, but they can only allocate each limit to one mode of transport.

Each time the speed camera flashes, the other candidates receive an order of pastel de nata which they attempt to deliver to the location displayed in a photograph within 10 minutes. For each successful delivery, money is added to the pot depending on the amount of tarts ordered.

'Vijandig Verleden' (Hostile Past)

The group have 45 minutes and 25 lives collectively to participate in a "laser game".

Candidates attempt to steal bags of money from a warehouse and bring it outside to add to the pot, with only two candidates allowed inside at once. However, each bag contains "negative money" which must be removed, otherwise money is deducted from the total. Inside the warehouse are also "opponents" from similar assignments in previous seasons guarding the money, who attempt to shoot candidates with a laser gun. Each time candidates are hit, they lose a life. Candidates can also shoot opponents with a laser gun to deactivate them for five seconds with each hit.

'The Line-Up'

As the current treasurer, Jurre is given an advantage. The other seven candidates stand in a "police lineup" wearing headphones which play a monologue from Rik. Unbeknownst to non-Mole contestants, from behind a one-way mirror, Jurre is given a microphone connected to the headset of the Mole, and is given the opportunity to speak at the Mole, for a maximum of three minutes, to try and evoke a reaction. The first 30 seconds are free, but money becomes increasingly deducted from the pot if further time is used, with a maximum €1,500 deducted beyond two minutes.

=== Episode 4 ===
Episode 4 - Een Prettig Weerzien?
Original airdates: 22 November 2025 Location: Lisbon
Assignment	Money earned	Possible earnings
Liefs Uit Lissabon	€750	€2,000
(Mis)Gunnen	€750	€2,500
Herhaling Van Zetten?	−€6,500	€3,000
Current Pot	€0	€20,500
Elimination
—N/a	Elimination discontinued	

'Liefs Uit Lissabon' (Love From Lisbon)

The group take a tram ride through Lisbon. Along the route are four points where they are photographed from both sides of the tram, for a total of eight photographs. Moments before reaching the first three points, candidates must sit themselves in order for the photos based on a certain criterion announced by Rik, or truthfully write who they answered as the Mole in the last quiz for the fourth stop. For each photograph correctly taken, €250 is added to the pot.

Three photographs were correctly taken, earning €750 for the pot. The group could then send these photographs as postcards to three provinces in the Netherlands, which were later hidden in suitcases within the provinces in November 2025. The finders of these postcards would receive invitations to the season's live finale.

'(Mis)Gunnen' ((Be)Grudge)

Four candidates are suspended above ground with a bag. After being released from the harness, they may drop the bag into one of three numbered boxes below while they are swinging, to claim its contents. However, they are unaware of the contents of each box. The remaining three candidates are told the contents of each box. Box 1 contains one Joker (for the candidate who dropped the bag); Box 2 deducts €250 from the pot; Box 3 contains €500 for the pot. Briefly before each of the four candidates are dropped, the three candidates can advise (or mislead) them on which box to drop the bag into.

Afterwards, the three candidates who did not drop the bags are given the chance to select one of the four candidates. If that candidate earned or lost money for the pot, the amount is doubled. If that candidate earned a Joker, their Joker is lost and the three candidates each receive one Joker in turn.

'Herhaling Van Zetten?' (Repetition of Moves)

After five candidates (Jurre, Kim, Loes, Merel and Nathan) are shown a green screen at the elimination ceremony, an assignment is held (presented by former host Art Rooijakkers). These candidates vote on whether to let the elimination ceremony continue, or end the elimination, effectively saving both candidates yet to see their screen (Anne-Marie and Sahil).

If a unanimous vote to continue the elimination occurs, €3,000 is deducted from the pot. If a majority (but not unanimous) vote to continue the elimination occurs, the pot remains the same. If a unanimous vote to discontinue the elimination occurs, the elimination is cancelled and €3,000 is earned for pot. However, if a majority (but not unanimous) vote to discontinue occurs, the entire pot is emptied. After the details are announced, the five candidates may only discuss in pairs before voting privately.

A majority, but not unanimous, vote to discontinue the elimination occurred. As a result, no one was eliminated and the entire pot (€6,500) was emptied.

=== Episode 5 ===
Episode 5 - Het Noodlot
Original airdates: 29 November 2025 Location: Lisbon & Sintra
Assignment	Money earned	Possible earnings
Alibi	€500	€2,000
Aan Tafel	€1,500	€3,000
Current Pot	€2,000	€25,500
Jokers
Anne-Marie, Sahil & Nathan	Aan Tafel	
Elimination
Sahil	4th player eliminated	

'Alibi'

The group have 45 minutes to investigate, question suspects and solve clues at the "crime scene" of the "murder" of the an estate owner. Afterwards, they attempt to identify the culprit, location and weapon of the murder. Correctly identifying one of these aspects earns €500, two earns €1,000, and all three earns €2,000 for the pot.

'Aan Tafel' (At the Table)

The group attend a two-course meal where they are served visually similar food and drinks. However, for one candidate's item in the first course, and two for the second, an unusual ingredient/flavour has been added. After each course, the group vote for one or two candidates who they believe received the modified item to leave the table, based on their reaction while eating or drinking. For each candidate correctly voted, €500 is added to the pot. However, these candidates may lie, as the candidates who remain later have the chance to earn advantages.

Once four candidates reach the end of the meal, they each receive a Joker and an envelope which they may decide to open. In each envelope is a note stating that if no one opens the envelope after the candidate, they receive a second Joker. However, any candidate who has someone open an envelope after them will lose both Jokers. Additionally, if all four candidates open the envelope, all Jokers are lost and €1,500 is added to the pot.

Anne-Marie, Merel, Nathan and Sahil remained by the end of the meal. Following the choices on whether or not to open the envelopes, Anne-Marie earned one Joker and Sahil earned two, one of which he gave to Nathan.

=== Episode 6 ===
Episode 6 - Rendez-Vous
Original airdates: 6 December 2025 Location: Algarve
Assignment	Money earned	Possible earnings
Gevonden Voorwerpen	€500	€3,000
Sinaasappelstrijd	€2,500	€2,500
Uittesten	€0	€2,000
Current Pot	€5,000	€33,000
Jokers
Anne-Marie	Gevonden Voorwerpen	
Double Elimination
Jurre	5th player eliminated	
Anne-Marie	6th player eliminated	

'Gevonden Voorwerpen' (Lost and Found)

Each candidate has 45 minutes to find an item used in an assignment from their previous season hidden in waterpark among several decoys, and only two candidates can enter the waterpark at once. Within the waterpark are also screens replaying previous assignments if candidates cannot recall the items. For each candidate that collects their item (and not a decoy) in time, €500 is added to the pot.

During the assignment, two candidates are privately offered the chance to earn up to three Jokers by leaving the waterpark and travelling in a van elsewhere. There, former host Pieter Jan Hagens assigns them a dilemma. One at a time, Pieter holds either zero, one or three Jokers behind a box, visible to only one candidate. With each turn, the candidate who cannot see the items must decide on whether to decline, accept, or give away (to the other candidate) the item at hand, with each decision to be used once. The candidate in view of the items may advise (or mislead) the deciding candidate, and Jokers earned here cannot be shared.

Anne-Marie and Kim were offered the chance to earn Jokers, where ultimately Anne-Marie ended up with one Joker after the dilemma.

'Sinaasappelstrijd' (Orange Battle)

At an orange farm, the group have 30 minutes to make bolo de laranja (a traditional orange cake), orange marmalade, and a mimosa. However, some of the required ingredients or items are locked and must be unlocked with a key. To obtain the keys, the group must answer six multiple choice questions. They must then squeeze oranges and fill the tube of the correct answer with juice so that the key inside floats to the top.

For each item made to the satisfaction of the farm owners, money is earned for the pot (€500 for the mimosa, €750 for the marmalade and €1,250 for the bolo de laranja).

'Uittesten' (Testing)

Before their quiz, which ends with a double elimination, each candidate receives a message from the Mole, allowing them to use their Mole notebook for the quiz. Additionally, each candidate can press a button in order to get a "glimpse" of the Mole. If exactly one candidate presses the button, €2,000 is earned for the pot, with no money earned otherwise.

Five candidates pressed the button to get a glimpse of the Mole, which in actuality was a trick, meaning no money was earned. After completing the quiz, all candidates had to relinquish their notebook.

=== Episode 7 ===
Episode 7 - De Laatste Slag
Original airdates: 13 December 2025 Location: Algarve
Assignment	Money earned	Possible earnings
Deinende Deuntjes	€2,340	Unknown (Note: The possible earnings for the "Deinende Deuntjes" assignment was not shown on screen and is therefore unknown, as the candidates could choose a song of any length. As a result, this value is not included in the calculations of the season's possible total earnings.)
Afslaan?	€0	€2,000
Current Pot	€7,340	€35,000
Elimination
Kim	7th player eliminated	

'Deinende Deuntjes' (Swaying Tunes)

Each candidate selects a song to sing during a speedboat ride. For every second they sing correctly, €5 is added to the pot.

'Afslaan?' (Turn Off?)

Each candidate has 20 minutes to attempt to putt a golf ball and score a hole-in-one from two different distances. If they score from 2.5 metres, they can read any candidate's Mole notebook for one minute. Additionally, if they score from three metres, they either add €500 to the pot or reclaim their Mole notebook (which all candidates had to surrender after the previous quiz) for the final quiz.

=== Episode 8 (Finale) ===
Episode 8
Original airdates: 20 December 2025 Location: Amsterdam, Netherlands
Assignment	Money earned	Possible earnings
Tien Mollen?	−€2,000	€1,000
Final Pot	€5,340	€36,000
Runner-up
Loes Haverkort
Winner
Merel Westrik
The Mole
Nathan Rutjes

The live finale was held at De Hallen in Amsterdam, Netherlands.

Nathan was revealed as the Mole, Loes finished as the runner-up and Merel was declared the winner of the season.

With Nathan announced as the Mole, €2,000 was deducted from the pot as Nathan was believed to be the Mole by the jury in the "Tien Mollen?" assignment from episode 1, bringing the final pot to €5,340.

== Mole activity ==
As the Mole, Nathan was briefed about assignments beforehand. The following Mole activity and acts of sabotage were revealed in the finale or online:

Episode 1

- Een Explosief Begin: Nathan insisted for his sub-group to collect suitcases which were further away, in order to try and fail to deliver them in time. He also frequently stalled to ask for directions and later insisted not to collect the final suitcase, seemingly in the interest of time, although there were still seven minutes remaining at that point.
- Tien Mollen?: Nathan gave answers to the jury in a manner which convinced them he was the Mole, where he was ultimately selected.

Episode 2

- Port(o): Nathan accepted the offer to hear information about the upcoming assignment, even though he already knew about it as the Mole, reducing the assignment's possible earnings to €1,500. For the assignment, Nathan selected to be in the group in the cellar. There, he did not correct other candidates when they misinterpreted provided instructions about the assignment. Additionally, he also suggested or agreed with incorrect barrels to be taken.

Episode 3

- Flitsbezorgen: Nathan was in the group attempting to activate the speed camera using different modes of transport. While using the roller-skates, Nathan purposely did not skate to his full potential and narrowly failed to activate the camera. He later used an unusual strategy of running with the skateboard and riding it past the camera at the last second, although he inadvertently succeeded here.
- Vijandig Verleden: Nathan did not take the negative money out of the bag he collected. He also allowed himself to get shot several times to lose lives, and burned some of the money in a barrel of fire within the warehouse.
- The Line-Up: With his advantage, Jurre got to talk at the Mole via a microphone and headset to try and evoke a reaction. During the interaction, Jurre made several humorous sounds and voices; Nathan suppressed his smile/laughter to avoid giving away his identity during this.

Episode 4

- Liefs Uit Lissabon: The criteria for the photographs at one point required candidates to arrange themselves alphabetically according to the country where they started their original season. Nathan saw that Loes was in the incorrect position and did not correct her. Additionally, the criteria for another point required candidates to sit on the left or right of the tram based on which group they answered the Mole was in for the "Flitsbezorgen" assignment in the previous quiz. Nathan sat on the incorrect side, knowing the quiz answers could not be traced. As a result, the four photos at these points were incorrect.
- (Mis)Gunnen: Nathan dropped his bag into the box worth money, as advised, in order to garner trust.
- Herhaling Van Zetten?: Nathan attempted to convince other candidates to vote not to continue the elimination to ensure no one would be eliminated, which they ultimately did. Nathan then cast the sole vote to continue the elimination, resulting in a majority (but not unanimous) vote to discontinue the elimination and therefore emptying the entire pot.

Episode 5

- Alibi: Knowing the culprit, location and weapon of the murder, Nathan attempted to misdirect Anne-Marie and Loes from the murder weapon (the candlestick), although he was not successful at doing so. Later, when they mistakenly identified the location of the murder to be the library, Nathan did not correct them and supported the decision.
- Aan Tafel: Nathan was one of the four candidates to reach the end of the meal. Knowing the upcoming dilemma, he avoided opening the envelope first or last in order to be able to influence two outcomes to achieve his objective of not having all four envelopes be opened (as this would earn money for the pot), which he ultimately succeeded.

Episode 6

- Gevonden Voorwerpen: When describing the scenes of previous seasons on screens in the waterpark, Nathan frequently referred to the required items in plural form. This resulted in several candidates collecting both the required item and a decoy, which would earn no money for the pot. He also stalled within the waterpark so he did not find the item from his season in time.
- Sinaasappelstrijd: Nathan discretely threw away some of the oranges, requiring candidates to collect more.
- Uittesten: As the Mole, Nathan was standing behind each candidate (behind a one-way mirror) when he delivered the message to each candidate during their quiz.

Episode 7

- Deinende Deuntjes: Nathan chose to sing the song Viervoeters by Extince as it was a long song and gave him the chance to incorrectly sing more lyrics. During the speedboat ride, Nathan sang the song to 35% accuracy, but sang confidently to hide the fact that he was altering the lyrics. Before the assignment, he also determined the direction the speedboat would ride by performing the movement on a remote controlled boat toy.
- Afslaan?: Nathan decided to reclaim his Mole notebook for the final quiz instead of adding €500 to the pot, knowing that others would do the same.

== Hidden clues ==
The following clues to the Mole were revealed by the show:

Episode 1

- Een Explosief Begin: One of the challenges the five former Moles had to complete was hanging photos of former Moles in chronological order on a line with clothes pegs. In the correct order, four photos would be hanged by a green peg to form a combination they needed: Inge Ipenburg, Susan Visser, Thomas Cammaert and Jeroen Kijk in de Vegte. The first letters of their names partially spell out the name of the previous mole, Stijn (de Vries), with only the letter N missing, the first letter of this season's Mole's name.

Episode 2

- Port(o): The location where Nathan was offered to hear about the upcoming assignment was in an underground cellar; moles are animals which are primarily underground. Additionally, the group who underwent the wine tasting had to identify a 20-year old tawny port among several wines, a reference to the fact that the Mole was from season 20.
- Repetitie: In the lab was a sign denoting "Mol = 6.022×10^{23}." This number is known as the Avogadro constant, commonly denoted by N_{A}, a reference to Nathan's name. Additionally, one of the experiments required the group to determine the pH of cola. Nathan's favorite drink is cola which he often drank at meals throughout the season.

Episode 3

- Flitsbezorgen: The trays that the group delivering pastel de nata used had a paper lining which said pastel de nata. However, on the underside of the lining had the words modified to "pastel de natan", a reference to Nathan's name. Additionally, the café the pastel de nata were delivered from was called "Nata", and signage at the venue spelled out "Nata" or "Natan".
- The Line-Up: The candidates in the line-up stood in front of a height chart. On the chart, the measurement for five feet (152 cm) was inaccurately listed to be six feet (183 cm) instead, which was Nathan's height.

Episode 4

- Liefs Uit Lissabon: Rik told the tram conductor the name of the Mole before the assignment. At each photograph point were signs with Portuguese words which formed the sentence "Ask the conductor who you are looking for and he will answer".
- Episode 4 quiz: During the episode 4 quiz, a confessional from Jurre explaining his strategy was played where he said "Being the Mole is super intense [...] who just wants to chill?". In the background, Nathan is seen "chilling" on a chair to await the results of the elimination ceremony.

Episode 5

- Aan Tafel: The dining room the assignment was held in had a framed football kit on the wall, a reference to Nathan's occupation as a trainer and former professional footballer.

Episode 6

- Uittesten: During the assignment, Nathan was the only contestant not to press the button to get a "glimpse" of the Mole, as in reality he could not take the quiz and give himself the Mole's message at the same time.

Episode 7

- Deinende Deuntjes: Nathan chose to sing the song "Viervoeters" by Extince. In Dutch, the term viervoeters collectively refers to animals with four legs. The mole is an animal with four legs.

== Reception ==
=== Viewing figures ===
For more information, see: List of seasons of "Wie is de Mol?" (in Dutch)

Viewing figures
#	Title	Air Date	Time Slot	Average	Total (Note: These figures include delayed viewings for at least one consecutive minute.)
1	Ik ben de Mol	November 1, 2025	Saturday 20.30 CET	3,081,000	3,647,000
2	Een Lesje Geleerd	November 8, 2025	Saturday 20.30 CET	2,752,000	3,282,000
3	Een duister verleden	November 15, 2025	Saturday 20.30 CET	2,612,000	3,115,000
4	'Een Prettig Weerzien?'	November 22, 2025	Saturday 20.30 CET	2,664,000	3,137,000
5	'Het Noodlot'	November 29, 2025	Saturday 20.30 CET	2,417,000	2,935,000
6	'Rendez-Vous'	December 6, 2025	Saturday 20.30 CET	2,254,000	2,857,000
7	'De Laatste Slag'	December 13, 2025	Saturday 20.30 CET	2,571,000	3,111,000
8	'De Finale'	December 20, 2025	Saturday 20.30 CET	2,612,000	3,211,000
