= Wie is de Mol? (Dutch TV series) season 26 =

Dutch reality television season

Wie is de Mol?
- Season 26
- Presented by: Rik van de Westelaken
- No. of contestants: 10
- Winner: Bram Krikke
- Runner-up: Quinty Misiedjan
- Location: Tanzania
- The Mole: Daan Boom
- No. of episodes: 10

Release
- Original network: AVROTROS (NPO 1)
- Original release: 28 February – 2 May 2026

Season chronology
- ← Previous; 25th Anniversary season

The twenty-sixth season of the Dutch TV series Wie is de Mol? ("Who is the Mole?") premiered on AVROTROS on 28 February 2026, later than usual due to the 2026 Winter Olympics. The season, hosted by Rik van de Westelaken, was filmed in Tanzania and featured ten candidates, one of whom was the Mole.

On 3 January 2026, a short preview special called De Eerste Blik: Wie is de Mol? aired on AVROTROS (NPO 1) to reveal the candidates and location of the season. This season also saw the return of the Moltalk aftershow (changed to a preshow this season) on NPO 1, after a one-season hiatus during the preceding anniversary season.

The season finale saw Bram Krikke win the €13,280 prize pot by unmasking Daan Boom as the Mole, with Quinty Misiedjan finishing as the runner-up.

== Candidates ==
The ten candidates were announced on 3 January 2026.

| Candidate | Occupation | Result |
|---|---|---|
| Bram Krikke | DJ and presenter | Winner |
| Daan Boom | Presenter and programme producer | The Mole |
| Quinty Misiedjan | Presenter and programme maker | 2nd place |
| Matteo van der Grijn | Actor | 3rd place |
| Milan van Dongen | Sports reporter and presenter | 4th place |
| Eveline Stallaart | Sexologist and psychologist | 5th place |
| Nienke van Dijk | Actress and presenter | 6th place |
| Delilah Warcup-van Eyck | Actress and food writer | 7th place |
| Nasrdin Dchar | Actor | 8th place |
| Geraldine Kemper | Presenter | 9th place |

== Candidate progress ==
The order in which the candidates learned their results are indicated in the table below.

Summary of candidates progress
| Candidate | Episode | | | | | | | | |
| Candidate | 1 | 2 | 3 | 4 | 5/6 | 7 | 8 | 9 (Note: The final four candidates took the final quiz in episode 9. Matteo scored the lowest and was eliminated while the remaining three contestants progressed to the finale.) | Finale |
|---|---|---|---|---|---|---|---|---|---|
| Bram | | | | 1st | 2nd (1) | | 1st | 1st | Winner |
| Daan | | 3rd | (1) | | 3rd (1) | | 2nd | 2nd | The Mole |
| Quinty | exempt | 2nd | 1st | | | 1st | | 3rd | Runner-Up |
| Matteo | (2) | | | 2nd | | | 3rd | Eliminated | |
| Milan | (1) | | 2nd (1) | (1) | (1) | 2nd | Eliminated | | |
| Eveline | Eliminated | 1st | | | 1st | Eliminated | | | |
| Nienke | exempt | | (1) | | Eliminated | | | | |
| Delilah | | | | Eliminated | | | | | |
| Nasrdin | (2) | | Eliminated (1) | | | | | | |
| Geraldine | | Eliminated | | | | | | | |

For candidates who used Jokers to correct an incorrect answer on a quiz, the amount used are presented in parentheses.

Key
The candidate won the season.
The candidate was revealed as the Mole.
The candidate finished as the runner-up.
The candidate saw a green screen, in the order stated, and therefore proceeded to the next episode.
The candidate did not see a green screen before the eliminated player saw their red screen. Thus they proceeded to the next episode.
The candidate was immune from elimination through an Exemption or other means.
The candidate was eliminated.

== Episodes ==
| Episode | Air Date | Title | Amount in Pot (Note: Pot earnings: indicates an increase indicates no change indicates a decrease) | Location | Days | Eliminated |
|---|---|---|---|---|---|---|
| 1 | February 28, 2026 | 'In het Duister Tasten' (Being in the Dark) | €0 → €4,500 | Manyara | 1–2 | Eveline (Note: After her elimination, Eveline returned to the game in episode 2 after the group decided to unlock her Jeep in the "In het Vizier" assignment.) |
| 2 | March 7, 2026 | 'Door het Oog van de Naald' (Through the Eye of a Needle) | €4,500 → €5,800 | Arusha | 3–5 | Geraldine |
| 3 | March 14, 2026 | 'Door Andere Ogen Bekijken' (See Through Different Eyes) | €5,800 → €6,500 | Arusha | 5–7 | Nasrdin |
| 4 | March 21, 2026 | 'Blindelings Volgen' (Follow Blindly) | €6,500 → €8,050 | Arusha | 7–8 | Delilah |
| 5 | March 28, 2026 | 'Met Een Schuin Oog Kijken' (To Keep an Eye on) | €8,050 → €6,500 | Arusha / Kilimanjaro | 9–10 | —N/a |
| 6 | April 4, 2026 | 'Door De Bril Van Een Ander Zien' (Seeing Through Someone Else's Eyes) | €6,500 → €8,460 | Kilimanjaro | 10–12 | Nienke |
| 7 | April 11, 2026 | 'Elk Paar Ogen Telt' (Every Pair of Eyes Counts) | €8,460 → €9,100 | Zanzibar | 13–15 | Eveline |
| 8 | April 18, 2026 | 'Doorzien' (See Through) | €9,100 → €11,100 | Zanzibar | 15–16 | Milan |
| 9 | April 25, 2026 | 'De Ogen Niet Geloven' (Can't Believe My Eyes) | €11,100 → €13,280 (Note: The outcome of the final assignment, held in episode 9, was withheld until the finale.) | Zanzibar | 16–18 | Matteo |
| 10 (Finale) | May 2, 2026 | 'De Ontknoping' | €11,100 → €13,280 | Amsterdam, Netherlands | Runner-up | Quinty |
| 10 (Finale) | May 2, 2026 | 'De Ontknoping' | €11,100 → €13,280 | Amsterdam, Netherlands | Winner | Bram |
| 10 (Finale) | May 2, 2026 | 'De Ontknoping' | €11,100 → €13,280 | Amsterdam, Netherlands | The Mole | Daan |

== Season summary ==
=== Episode 1 ===
Episode 1 - In Het Duister Tasten
Original airdates: 28 February 2026 Location: Manyara
| Assignment | Money earned | Possible earnings |
|---|---|---|
| Jij Bent ... de Mol | —N/a | |
| Lodge Game | €1,500 | €3,500 |
| De Olifant van Tanzania | €3,000 | €3,000 |
| Current Pot | €4,500 | €6,500 |
Jokers
| Matteo, Milan and Nasrdin | Lodge Game | |
Exemption
| Nienke and Quinty | Olifant van Tanzania | |
Elimination
| Eveline | 1st player eliminated | |

Jij Bent ... de Mol (You Are...the Mole)

Upon arrival, each contestant sits at one of ten tables, each with the nametag of a candidate and a computer. Once sat, each contestant watches a video on that computer, showing the pre-season casting where the candidate named at the table was told whether or not they were the Mole. Afterwards, it was announced that contestants did not have to necessarily sit at the table with their name on it. Candidates are then informed to remember the number 26 which is meaningful to the season.

Lodge Game

Contestants are split into pairs based on the rooms they selected for the night. Each pair is locked in a room, containing varying amounts of money.

Across two rounds, the group discuss via phone and votes for three pairs to leave their room (as individuals) and attempt to bring their money undetected to host Rik van de Westelaken at another cabin within 10 minutes, and must restart each time they are caught by patrolling rangers. Up to €3,500 can be earned, should the three pairs with the highest amounts of money successfully bring it to Rik.

However, pairs may lie about their amount of money in order to be chosen, as any pairs (or individuals) who make it to Rik can also open one of three chests for potential advantages: (1) one Joker if they take this episode's quiz; (2) two Jokers if they take this episode's quiz; and (3) information about the potential Exemption in the next assignment.

As they opened the Joker chests and later took the quiz, Matteo and Nasrdin received two Jokers and Milan received one.

Olifant van Tanzania (Elephant of Tanzania)

The group have 30 minutes to move a large wooden elephant across a field using logs and rope. The further they move the elephant, the more money is earned, with the potential of €3,000 if they reach the end.

Along the field are also three poles. At each pole, the group can select one candidate to read the sign there, containing information that cannot be shared with the group during the assignment. Each sign states that the contestant has a chance to earn an Exemption if they decide to remain at the pole (instead of helping move the elephant).

After the 30 minutes, the group are given the choice of whether to keep the money they earned, or to forfeit the money and open the wooden elephant. Inside the elephant are ten chairs which would mean that all contestants would have had to take the elimination quiz. However, the group elected not to open the elephant, meaning that the contestants who remained at the poles, Nienke and Quinty, received an Exemption.

=== Episode 2 ===
Episode 2 - Door het Oog van de Naald
Original airdates: 7 March 2026 Location: Arusha
| Assignment | Money earned | Possible earnings |
|---|---|---|
| In het Vizier | €500 | €2,500 |
| Uniek | €800 | €1,600 |
| Current Pot | €5,800 | €10,600 |
Jokers
| Geraldine | Uniek | |
Elimination
| Geraldine | 2nd player eliminated | |

In het Vizier (In the Spotlight)

After each candidate selects one of ten keys, two candidates at a time search a Jeep depot for a Jeep their key unlocks, select one of the four envelopes inside and try to bring the envelope out of the depot without being photographed by "tourists" walking around the area. Candidates photographed by tourists forfeit any envelopes they hold and can no longer participate, and there is a 45-minute time-limit.

The envelopes in each Jeep contain different amounts of money (including negative) up to €250. Candidates can determine the €250 envelope by reading the Jeep's number plate to the rest of the group via radio, so they can then check papers which list the €250 envelope for each vehicle, and relay that information back.

Additionally, some Jeeps contain additional keys which unlock another Jeep with eliminated contestant Eveline inside. If any candidate opens this Jeep, Eveline returns to the game, and can participate in the assignment with the leftover tenth key; Nienke ultimately unlocked this Jeep, allowing Eveline to return to the game.

Uniek (Unique)

Candidates are each given TSh 20,000 to spend at a market and divide into two groups of five. Each group has 15 minutes to buy five items across five given categories (such as vegetables), beginning with the letter spun on a wheel. For each item a group purchased which is different from the other group's for the category, €80 is added to the pot. The group then repeat this process once more with five different categories of items.

Additionally, in the market is also a stall selling Jokers, where candidates who notice can buy Jokers at the price of TSh 10,000 each; Geraldine bought one Joker.

=== Episode 3 ===
Episode 3 - Door Andere Ogen Bekijken
Original airdates: 14 March 2026 Location: Arusha
| Assignment | Money earned | Possible earnings |
|---|---|---|
| Je Gaat Het Pas Zien Als Je Het Door Hebt | €700 | Unknown (Note: The potential earnings for the "Je Gaat Het Pas Zien Als Je Het Door Hebt" assignment (episode 3) was not shown and is therefore unknown. As a result, this total is not included in the calculation of the season's possible earnings.) |
| In Kaart Brengen | €0 | €1,500 |
| Je Ogen De Kost Geven | —N/a | |
| Current Pot | €6,500 | €12,100 |
Jokers
| Daan, Nasrdin, Nienke and Milan | Je Ogen De Kost Geven | |
Elimination
| Nasrdin | 3rd player eliminated | |

Je Gaat Het Pas Zien Als Je Het Door Hebt (You'll Only See It Once You Get the Hang of It)

Seven candidates play a 30-minute football match against a local Tanzanian team. For every goal they score, €100 is added to the pot. Meanwhile, the remaining two candidates are taken to an apartment, where they attempt to throw balls from a bench and land them into various cups around the room. Each time a ball is landed, the Tanzanian team momentarily freezes in place during the football match, making it easier for the other candidates to score.

In Kaart Brengen (Mapping)

At Lake Duluti, a lake resembling the shape of Tanzania, are ten signs of Tanzanian towns/cities on floating platforms. Two candidates are given a map of Tanzania and a birds-eye view of the lake. Via walkie talkie, they must direct the remaining seven candidates, who are spread across three boats, so they can paddle out and move the signs to their geographically correct platform (according to the lake shape). For each sign on the correct platform at the end of 45 minutes, €100 is added to the pot, with a bonus €500 awarded if all ten are correct.

Je Ogen de Kost Geven (A Feast for the Eyes)

The group spend the evening at a local nightclub. Candidates who notice certain clubgoers wearing shirts with Swahili text can get the message translated to reveal a task. The first candidate to complete each task, such as finding a clubgoer's lost jacket, receives a Joker. Additionally, one candidate who notices a clubgoer wearing a shirt with an eye symbol (shown previously on the wheel from the "Uniek" assignment) can obtain an advantage allowing them to later watch the body camera footage of all candidates during the "In het Vizier" assignment from episode 2.

By the end of the night, Milan received two Jokers while Daan, Nasrdin and Nienke received one. Additionally, Quinty obtained the advantage to view the body camera footage.

=== Episode 4 ===
Episode 4 - Blindelings Volgen
Original airdates: 21 March 2026 Location: Arusha
| Assignment | Money earned | Possible earnings |
|---|---|---|
| Eyeopener | €550 | €2,000 |
| Hulplijn | €1,000 | €4,000 |
| Current Pot | €8,050 | €18,100 |
Jokers
| Milan | Hulplijn | |
Elimination
| Delilah | 4th player eliminated | |

Eyeopener

Within a factory are eight safes containing varying amounts of money (distributed by the Mole beforehand, totalling €2,000), each of which can only be opened by a certain candidate. There are also four decoy safes anyone can open, which deduct money if opened.

Candidates divide themselves into two groups which start at different rooms in the factory. At each room are eight photos and a computer. Communicating via radio, groups must figure out eight passwords, which are compound words formed from one photo at each room. The passwords reveal the safe assigned to a certain candidate once entered into the computer.

To open the safes, candidates must search the factory for their safe and open it with an iris scan to obtain the money inside. However, around the factory are also guards attempting to shoot candidates with a laser gun. Candidates can no longer participate in the assignment if they are shot twice or have collected money from a safe. There is a 45-minute time limit overall, and only two candidates can search the factory at a time.

Hulplijn (Helpline)

The group select four candidates to abseil down a silo to earn up to €1,000 each. Before they abseil, the remaining four candidates are privately given additional information about the assignment. Along the silos are four ringing phones which the abseiling candidate may answer, which costs €250 per call. Each non-abseiling candidate can communicate by radio with one of the abseiling candidates during their abseil. If the non-abseiling candidates manage to get the abseiling candidates to answer less than eight (out of 16) phone calls in total, then the non-abseiling candidates would not have to see their screen during the next elimination, potentially resulting in no elimination this episode.

The phones contain information which may benefit the abseiling candidate if answered: (1) being told who their partner answered as the Mole in the last quiz; (2) the chance to earn a Joker by guessing an item within two minutes, asking only "yes or no" questions; (3) being told a question on the upcoming quiz; and (4) being told the full details of this assignment.

Milan earned one Joker during the abseil. The four non-abseiling candidates failed to have less than eight phones answered, meaning all contestants would be eligible to see their screen during the elimination ceremony, guaranteeing an elimination.

=== Episode 5 ===
Episode 5 - Met Een Schuin Oog Kijken
Original airdates: 28 March 2026 Location: Arusha and Kilimanjaro
| Assignment | Money earned | Possible earnings |
|---|---|---|
| Weet Je? | €1,000 | €2,000 |
| Een Geschenk Uit de Hemel | €950 | €1,500 |
| Déjà Vu | −€3,500 | —N/a |
| Current Pot | €6,500 | €21,600 |

Weet Je? (You Know What?)

In a coffee factory are 40 sacks, each labelled with a fact about one of the candidates written in Swahili. The group have 45 minutes to translate the facts using a speech-to-text translator, fill each sack with 20 kilograms of coffee beans, and place them outside by the name of the candidate its fact is about. For each sack filled and correctly placed, €50 is earned for the pot.

Een Geschenk Uit de Hemel (A Gift from Heaven)

Throughout the assignment, a drone drops bags of money, €1,500 in total, in a coffee plantation. From a watchtower, two candidates have a birds-eye-view of the plantation and direct other candidates (via walkie-talkie) so they find the money. In the plantation are also guards; anyone caught by a guard can no longer participate in the assignment. Only two candidates can enter the plantation at a time, and there is a 30-minute time limit for the assignment.

Déjà Vu

Upon arrival in Kilimanjaro, contestants are presented with seven tables, each with the nametag of a candidate and a computer - much like the setup of the "Jij Bent ... de Mol" assignment from episode 1. Candidates can sit at a table (not necessarily the one with their nametag) and watch the video on that computer at the cost of €500 each. Once sat, candidates watch the video on their chosen computer, showing the pre-season casting where the candidate named at the table explains their strategy if they were to be the Mole.

Interspersed during the video are short clips of all candidates. Afterwards, the hint about the number 26 from episode 1 is explained; the Mole was shown at exactly 26 seconds into each video.

=== Episode 6 ===
Episode 6 - Door De Bril Van Een Ander Zien
Original airdates: 4 April 2026 Location: Kilimanjaro
| Assignment | Money earned | Possible earnings |
|---|---|---|
| Aanbod Van de Mol | €0 | €1,000 |
| Met de Masai | €1,460 | Unknown (Note: The potential earnings for the "Met de Masai" assignment (episode 6) was not shown and is therefore unknown. As a result, this total is not included in the calculation of the season's possible earnings.) |
| Verhalenvertellers | €500 | €2,000 |
| Current Pot | €8,460 | €24,600 |
Jokers
| Bram | Aanbod Van de Mol | |
Elimination
| Nienke | 5th player eliminated | |

Aanbod Van de Mol (The Mole's Offer)

The previous night, one contestant was privately given a secret challenge from the Mole - using four proverbs with the word oog (eye) at dinner - where they could earn two Jokers by completing it undetected by the rest of the group. During dinner, the group attempt to identify the candidate and their secret challenge. If they are successful, the Jokers are not earned and €1,000 is added to the pot.

Bram received the offer and successfully completed the secret challenge, earning him two Jokers, one of which he later gave to Daan.

Met de Masai (With the Masai)

The group undergo a walk to a village, completing several Maasai activities along the way to earn money. First, three candidates carry a bucket of water on their heads down a section of the trail to earn €400, with €100 lost for every litre spilled. Second, the group throw spears at a target, earning €125 for each hit in 10 minutes. Third, the group must render a wall with mud, then six candidates jump from behind the wall to be captured in a photo taken by the remaining candidate from the other side, with up to €400 to be earned based on how many candidates are in the photo (at the same time) by the end of 15 minutes. Lastly, the group must carry a pile of wood to a campfire, earning up to €400 depending on how much is ultimately delivered.

Verhalenvertellers (Storytellers)

Beforehand, candidates privately ranked each other from most to least likely to be the Mole. The candidate ranked as least likely overall is told a story about Masai colours by Rik, in addition to three questions on the upcoming quiz. This candidate then relays the information (if they wish) to the next two candidates in the ranking, who then split up to pass on the information to the remaining four candidates who were ranked as the most likely. Afterwards, these four candidates are each asked two questions about the information told by Rik, including about the questions on the upcoming quiz, and earn €250 for each correct answer.

=== Episode 7 ===
Episode 7 - Elk Paar Ogen Telt
Original airdates: 11 April 2026 Location: Zanzibar
| Assignment | Money earned | Possible earnings |
|---|---|---|
| Zanzi Bar | €240 | €1,800 |
| Freddie Mercury | €150 | €1,500 |
| Oog in Oog Met de Mol | €250 | €1,500 |
| Current Pot | €9,100 | €29,400 |
Elimination
| Eveline | 6th player eliminated (re-elimination) | |

Zanzi Bar

After the last elimination, a video plays telling two candidates who want to "take the leap" to enter a Jeep. They are taken to go skydiving and are given a list of 15 cocktails to memorise as they fall. For each cocktail they can name once they land, €40 is added to the pot.

Meanwhile, the remaining four candidates have 30 minutes to arrange furniture and decorations at a beachside pavilion to match six example photos. For each setup correctly replicated, €200 is added to the pot.

Freddie Mercury

The group divide themselves into three pairs. Two pairs are taken to different locations around Stone Town, the park and the city, to take ten photos representing ten given Queen songs in 20 minutes. Additionally, the pair in the city cannot take photos containing people, the pair at the park can only take photos of people, and pairs cannot retake any photos.

Meanwhile, the third pair listen to ten headphone sets playing the songs backwards and attempt to identify each song played. They then attempt to assign two photos, one from each other pair, to these respective songs. For each song correctly identified with the correct two photos assigned to it, €150 is added to the pot.

Oog in Oog Met de Mol (Eye to Eye with the Mole)

Each contestant privately answers three multiple-choice questions about previous assignments of the season. If they answer all three questions correctly, €250 is added to the pot and the Mole comes to stand in front of them for one minute. However, if they answer any questions incorrectly, no money is earned and a (non-Mole) candidate stands in front of them instead. Contestants are not told whether or not they have answered the questions correctly.

=== Episode 8 ===
Episode 8 - Doorzien
Original airdates: 18 April 2026 Location: Zanzibar
| Assignment | Money earned | Possible earnings |
|---|---|---|
| Erop of Eronder | €500 | €2,500 |
| Samen Sterk | €1,500 | €2,000 |
| Current Pot | €11,100 | €33,900 |
Elimination
| Milan | 7th player eliminated | |

Erop of Eronder (Make or Break)

Three candidates take a multiple-choice quiz, as individuals, while underwater. For each correct answer, they can take a ball from a covered box worth varying amounts of money (including negative) for the pot, totalling €1,500.

Meanwhile, the remaining two candidates row a wooden boat back and forth between two buoys as much as they can, earning €50 per lap, up to a potential of €1,000. Each time one of the candidates underwater answers a question incorrectly, they must pull a cork out of the bottom of the boat, slowly filling the boat with water; they can no longer row once the boat is submerged.

Samen Sterk (Stronger Together)

With the Move Zanzibar Community Centre, a community organisation teaching acrobatics and dance, the group prepare a 20-minute performance including acrobatics, dancing and singing. Depending on the applause noise level from audience, up to €2,000 can be earned, an amount that the program would also make as a donation to the community centre.

=== Episode 9 ===
Episode 9 - De Ogen Niet Geloven
Original airdates: 25 April 2026 Location: Zanzibar
| Assignment | Money earned | Possible earnings |
|---|---|---|
| Molboekjes Inzien | €600 | €1,800 |
| The Big Five | €2,000 | €2,500 |
| Wie is de Mol? | −€420 | —N/a |
| Final Pot | €13,280 | €38,200 |
Elimination
| Matteo | 8th player eliminated | |

Molboekjes Inzien (View Mole Books)

Several "intruders" attempt to steal the notebooks of the six eliminated contestants, located at abandoned resort. Candidates attempt to stop the intruders by shooting them with paintballs. Each candidate's paintball gun is loaded with five paintballs to begin, but they can obtain more by breaking open nearby wooden crates. For each notebook not stolen by the end of the assignment, the group can exchange it for €300, or read it (as a group) for a limited time.

The Big Five

The group take a "safari" ride through the city where they are instructed to spot and photograph the "Big Five". Unbeknownst to them, these were actually five of the eliminated contestants along the route dressed as animals. If the group manage to photograph all five "animals", €1,250 is added to the pot. Along the way, Rik presents ten quotes said by contestants during the season, and the group attempt to determine who said them. For each correct answer, €125 is added to the pot.

Wie is de Mol? (Who is the Mole?)

Ahead of the final quiz, conestants are privately given the offer to come "eye to eye" with the Mole. If contestants accept the offer, they throw two dice and attempt to roll a two and a six at the same time. Money is deducted from the pot during the time contestants spend rolling, although they can stop rolling at any time. Contestants who successfully roll a two and six can then momentarily view a photo showing the eyes of many people, with the eyes of the Mole hidden amongst them.

=== Episode 10 (Finale) ===
Episode 10 - De Ontknoping
Original airdates: 2 May 2026
Location: Amsterdam, Netherlands
Runner-up
Quinty
Winner
Bram
The Mole
Daan

The live finale was held at De Hallen Studios in Amsterdam, Netherlands.

Daan was revealed as the Mole, Bram was declared the winner of the season, and Quinty finished as the runner-up.

Following the reveal of the Mole, the outcome of the "Wie is de Mol?" assignment from the previous episode was revealed; €420 was deducted from the pot, bringing the final pot to €13,280.

== Mole activity ==
The following Mole activity were revealed:

Episode 1

- Jij Bent ... de Mol: Daan walked among the front of the group towards the setup of the assignment, but avoided being the first to sit at a table. Upon seeing Milan sit at the table with his own nametag, Daan did the same (thereby preventing others from seeing his video where he revealed as the Mole), eventually leading to all candidates sitting at their own table.
- Lodge Game: As the Mole, Daan got to decide which pair received each amount of money. He assigned the highest amount of €1,500 to him and Bram, and the lowest amount of €0 to Matteo and Nasrdin, believing they would be good at lying about it since they are both actors. Daan then voted for Matteo and Nasrdin as one of the pairs to get to leave their room, and both pairs were ultimately voted to do so. While delivering the money, Daan offered to serve as a distraction to the guards so that Nasrdin (who he knew possessed no money) could make it to Rik. Daan allowed himself to get caught by a guard after "tripping", and did not deliver the €1,000 he was assigned to bring in time.

Episode 2

- In het Vizier: Knowing that another candidate could watch bodycamera footage as an advantage in a future assignment, Daan collected the €250 envelope as advised, but swapped it out of view of his camera for an envelope worth negative €250.
- Uniek: Each group entered the market separately for both rounds. When his group entered first, Daan saw limes which fit the category of fruits beginning with "L", but did not allude to it until time was almost up to ensure it would not be bought in time. When his group entered second, Daan was briefed about which items the other group bought, and attempted to get his group to also buy some of them. Additionally, he also stalled for time in the market and avoided making a purchase of the final item (a toy) in time by hesitating about which one to grab in the final seconds.

Episode 3

- Je Gaat Het Pas Zien Als Je Het Door Hebt: Daan spent time celebrating after many of the goals, reducing time the group had to score additional goals during the match.
- In Kaart Brengen: Daan was in a boat with Eveline for the assignment. Sitting at the back, Daan sometimes did not paddle properly. During the assignment, he also dialled in while others were communicating on the walkie-talkies, thereby disrupting the conversation. Additionally, after being given "vague" instructions from Delilah and Milan, Daan eventually ended up moving a correctly-placed sign to another platform.
- Je Ogen de Kost Geven: Daan completed a task to earn a Joker, even though he didn’t need one as the Mole, to appear as a genuine contestant.

Episode 4

- Eyeopener: Daan assigned a moderate amount of €200 for his safe to appear as a contestant when he eventually opened it. After opening a safe, candidates had to exit the factory and no longer participate. Once Daan opened his safe, he dressed up as a guard and attempted to shoot other candidates trying to find their safes, particularly those he assigned higher amounts of money for. Additionally, once he saw Delilah heading towards a decoy safe, he did not shoot her, allowing her to open the safe which deducted money.
- Hulplijn: Daan was one of the candidates abseiling, during which he feigned having a fear of heights to reduce suspicion. During the abseil he also answered some of the calls despite being advised not to by Delilah.

Episode 5

- Weet Je?: Daan’s removed the fact labels from several sacks, wasted time at the translator, and pretended to fill a bag with coffee beans which he later emptied. After seemingly hearing one of the factory workers mention the word "Joker", Daan causes the group to spend some time looking through coffee beans for Jokers (for which there were none) rather than completing the assignment.
- Een Geschenk Uit de Hemel: Daan removed some money from a bag he collected, and from one that Milan collected. He also hid other bags of they that had been dropped so they would later not be found by others.

Episode 6

- Aanbod Van de Mol: Daan gave Bram the offer by sliding it under his hotel door. Bram later called Daan, who he had an alliance with, and informed him of the offer, to which Daan helped Bram earn the Jokers under the guise of their alliance. During the dinner, Daan initiated the group to say "cheers" in Swahili several times to mislead them into believing this was the secret challenge, which they ultimately did so.
- Met de Masai: For the spear throwing, Daan purposefully missed for two of his throws. For the challenge requiring the group to coat a wall with mud, Daan intentionally misinterpreted the instructions and convinced several others to join him coating the other side of the wall as well, when they only needed to coat one side. This reduced the time they later had to take the photograph from behind the wall. While jumping for the photograph, Daan mistimed his jumps, resulting in him not being visible in many photos where others were. For the wood carrying, Daan also dropped some wood along the way and left it behind.
- Verhalenvertellers: As one of the candidates answering questions, Daan answered both of his questions incorrectly.

Episode 7

- Zanzi Bar: Daan was in the group arranging furniture at the beach bar. There, he hid several of the smaller items in the sand, although one of them (a lime) ended up being found Bram.
- Freddie Mercury" Daan and Matteo were at the park and could only take photos of people to represent the songs, with no objects allowed. When Matteo suggested ideas for photographs which had objects in them, or would have been unclear about which song they represented, Daan did not object to these. Additionally, Daan also "misclicked" and took a photo of Matteo before he was ready, which was submitted because they were not allowed to retake.
- Oog in Oog Met de Mol: When Eveline answered all three questions right, Daan came to stand in front of her. Later, when Daan did not answer all his questions right, Bram came to stand in front of him. During this, Daan acted how he would have if he was a genuine candidate and started laughing.

Episode 8

- Erop of Eronder: Daan was in the group answering questions underwater. There, he answered many questions incorrectly.

Episode 9

- Wie is de Mol?: Daan, in a disguised voice via computer, gave each candidate the offer of rolling the dice for the chance to come "eye to eye" with the Mole.

== Hidden clues ==
The following clues were revealed:

- In episode 1, Rik mentioned the number 26 would be meaningful during the season. Daan was on screen at exactly 26 seconds into episode 1. Additionally, Daan was on screen at exactly 26 seconds into each video during the "Déjà Vu" assignment in episode 6.
- The season had a recurring theme of eyes. Several times throughout the season, Daan formed the shape of an eye by holding his hands to his head.
- For the "Je Gaat Het Pas Zien Als Je Het Door Hebt" assignment in episode 3, a fan was holding up a Tanzanian football jersey as the group was walking towards the match, in support of the Tanzanian team. On the back of this jersey was the name Boom - Daan's last name. Additionally, in the graphic for the starting lineup for the match, Daan turned in the opposite way to the other candidates, to suggest he was an opponent.
- In the "In Kaart Brengen" assignment in episode 3, Daan (and Eveline) incorrectly swapped the signs of Dodoma and Madibira. Using the letters of these locations. Daan's last name, Boom, could be spelled.
- In the "Hulplijn" assignment in episode 4, the four abseiling candidates could earn a Joker during one of the calls by asking yes/no questions to guess one of the following items which their friend/family member had: dobblesteen (dice), banaan (banana), riem (belt) or spons (sponge). The letters in these items could be used to spell the name of the Mole: Daan Boom.
- While recreating at a beachside bar in episode 8, a boat with the words "Boom Boom" was offshore, a reference to Daan's last name.
- The first words Rik says in each episode to address candidates form the sentence "Welcome you are standing eye to eye with me Bram". This was a reference to the "Oog in Oog Met de Mol" assignment in episode 7 where Daan did not answer all his questions correctly, resulting in Bram coming to stand in front of him.

== Viewing figures ==
Viewing figures
| # | Title | Air Date | Time Slot | Average | Total (Note: These figures include delayed viewings for at least one consecutive minute.) |
|---|---|---|---|---|---|
| 1 | In Het Duister Tasten | February 28, 2026 | Saturday 20.30 CET | 2,785,000 | 3,467,000 |
| 2 | Door het Oog van de Naald | March 7, 2026 | Saturday 20.30 CET | 2,486,000 | 2,992,000 |
| 3 | Door Andere Ogen Bekijken | March 14, 2026 | Saturday 20.30 CET | 2,397,000 | 2,835,000 |
| 4 | Blindelings Volgen | March 21, 2026 | Saturday 20.30 CET | 2,604,000 | 3,000,000 |
| 5 | Met Een Schuin Oog Kijken | March 28, 2026 | Saturday 20.30 CET | 2,520,000 | 3,073,000 |
| 6 | Door De Bril Van Een Ander Zien | April 4, 2026 | Saturday 20.30 CET | 2,580,000 | 2,987,000 |
| 7 | Elk Paar Ogen Telt | April 11, 2026 | Saturday 20.30 CET | | |
| 8 | Doorzien | April 18, 2026 | Saturday 20.30 CET | 2,514,000 | 2,855,000 |
| 9 | De Ogen Niet Geloven | April 25, 2026 | Saturday 20.30 CET | | |
| 10 | De Ontknoping | May 2, 2026 | Saturday 20.30 CET | 2,340,000 | 3,089,000 |
