= Wie is de Mol? (Dutch TV series) season 23 =

Dutch reality television season

Wie is de Mol?
- Season 23
- Presented by: Rik van de Westelaken
- No. of contestants: 10
- Winner: Daniël Verlaan
- Runner-up: Ranomi Kromowidjojo
- Location: South Africa
- The Mole: Jurre Geluk
- No. of episodes: 10

Release
- Original network: AVROTROS (NPO 1)
- Original release: 7 January – 11 March 2023

Season chronology
- ← Previous; Season 22: Albania Next → Season 24: Mexico

The twenty-third season of the Dutch TV series Wie is de Mol? ("Who is the Mole?") began on 7 January 2023. This was the sixth season with Rik van de Westelaken as host. The candidates were announced on 26 November 2022. The season was filmed in South Africa. The 13th season was also filmed in South Africa, making the 2023 season the second time the show revisits a country, although this time the season was fully filmed in the Western Cape region. (Note: The candidates visited Australia during the 1999 and 2005 seasons.)

== Format ==
The season followed the same format as its Belgian predecessor. In total, ten candidates were gathered to complete assignments to earn money for the group pot. However, one of the ten is the titular Mole (de Mol), the one designated to sabotage the assignments and cause the group to earn the least amount of money for the winner's pot as possible. Every few days, players would take a 20-question multiple choice test about the identity of the Mole. Once the test is complete, the candidates await their results in an Execution ceremony. The candidate with the worst score is executed from the game, while in the event of a tie the candidate who completed their test the slowest is executed. The season plays out until there are three remaining candidates, where they must complete a final test (consisting of 40 questions). The candidate with the highest score, or who had completed their test the fastest in a tie, is declared the winner and receives the group's pot.

== Candidates ==
Name	Occupation	Day Exited	Result
Jurre Geluk	Television presenter	18	The Mole
Daniël Verlaan	Journalist	18	Winner
Ranomi Kromowidjojo	Olympic swimmer	18	2nd Place
Soy Kroon	Actor	17	3rd Place
Anke de Jong	Editor-in-chief of Elle Netherlands	14	4th Place
Nabil Aoulad Ayad	Actor	12	5th Place
Annick Boer	Comedian	9	6th Place
Sander de Kramer	Television presenter	6	7th Place
Froukje de Both	Television presenter	4	8th Place
Sarah Janneh	Actress	2	9th Place (Note: Sarah was given an opportunity to return to the game by successfully completing an assignment. She did not succeed and remained eliminated.)

=== Future appearances ===
Jurre Geluk returned as a contestant for the special 25th anniversary season of Wie is de Mol? in 2025. He ended up in 5th place after being eliminated in the 6th episode, broadcast on December 6, 2025.

== Candidate progress ==
The order in which the candidates learned their results are indicated in the table below.

Summary of candidates progress in each episode
Candidate	1	2	3	4 (Note: Each candidate saw their screen in this episode, as part of a game which took place before the execution, but only one candidate saw their screen during the execution itself.)	6	7	9	Finale
Daniël					exempt	3rd	1st	Winner
Jurre		2nd			exempt	1st	exempt	The Mole
Ranomi		3rd	1st		1st			Runner-Up
Soy		1st		exempt (Note: Before the execution, the candidates took part in a task where the candidate with the red screen (revealed in episode 9 to be Soy) was able to prevent themselves from being executed from the game. As they were successful, Annick with the second-worst score in the test was executed in their place.)	3rd	2nd	Executed	
Anke	3rd		2nd		2nd	Executed		
Nabil	2nd		3rd		Executed			
Annick				Executed				
Sander			Executed					
Froukje	1st	Executed						
Sarah	Executed (Note: After her execution, Sarah was informed at the hotel that she would have an opportunity to return to the game in the next episode if she succeeded in an assignment.)							

The candidate saw a Green Screen and proceeded to the next episode.
The candidate used Jokers for this test, and saw a Green Screen to proceed to the next episode.
The candidate used Jokers for this test, however, they did not see a Green Screen before the Executed player saw their Red Screen. Thus they proceeded to the next episode.
The candidate used a Black Exemption to nullify all Exemptions and Jokers for this test.
The candidate did not see a Green Screen before the Executed player saw their Red Screen. Thus they proceeded to the next episode.
The candidate received an Exemption to automatically proceed to the next episode.
The candidate was executed from the game and sent home.

== Episodes ==
For more information, see: List of seasons of "Wie is de Mol?" (in Dutch)

Episode	Air Date	Title	Amount in Pot (Note: Pot earnings: indicates an increase indicates no change indicates a decrease)	Location	Days	Eliminated
1	7 January 2023	'Verbinding' (Connection)	€0 → €3,250	Cape Town, Western Cape	1–2	Sarah (Note: Sarah was given an opportunity to return to the game in the next episode.)
2	14 January 2023	'Kunstgreep' (Artifice)	€3,250 → €4,800	Cape Town & Saldanha, Western Cape	3–4	Froukje
3	21 January 2023	'Spelbreker' (Spoilsport)	€4,800 → €8,050	Atlantis & Cape Town, Western Cape	5–6	Sander
4	28 January 2023	'Weglopen' (Walk away)	€8,050 → €8,350	Tulbagh, Western Cape	7–9	Annick
5	4 February 2023	'Portretten' (Portraits)	€8,350 → €6,800	Matjiesfontein & Tulbagh, Western Cape	9–11	—N/a
6	11 February 2023	'Lijdensweg?' (Agony?)	€6,800	Karoo & Oudtshoorn, Western Cape	11–12	Nabil
7	18 February 2023	'Inzichtelijk' (Insightful)	€6,800 → €8,400	Wilderness, Western Cape	13–14	Anke
8	25 February 2023	'Brandpunt' (Focal Point)	€8,400 → €10,650	Garden Route & De Rust, Western Cape	15–16	—N/a
9	4 March 2023	'Molafpraak' (Mole Appointment)	€10,650 → €11,650	Mossel Bay & Tsitsikamma, Western Cape	17–18	Soy
10	11 March 2023	'Poker Face'	€11,650	Baarn, Netherlands	Runner-up	Ranomi
10	11 March 2023	'Poker Face'	€11,650	Baarn, Netherlands	Winner	Daniël
10	11 March 2023	'Poker Face'	€11,650	Baarn, Netherlands	The Mole	Jurre

== Season summary ==
=== Episode 1 - Verbinding ===
Episode 1 - Verbinding
Original airdates: 7 January 2023 Location: Cape Town, Western Cape
Assignment	Money earned	Possible earnings
Gulden Middenweg	€500.-	€4,000.-
Toonaangevend	€2,750.-	€4,000.-
Current Pot	€3,250.-	€8,000.-
Execution
Sarah	1st player executed	

Two weeks before leaving to Cape Town, all candidates met in the Netherlands for the first time. Each candidate receives a phone call from Everon Jackson Hooi (the Mole of the previous season), which they must answer in front of the group, informing them of whether they are a candidate or the Mole.

Gulden Middenweg

Candidates are split into five pairs and locked in dark wooden boxes around Cape Town. To escape, pairs must ask passersby to switch on a light so they can see three questions in the box and answer them correctly. At each box, pairs can also help each other answer the questions using phones. Some questions also require passersby to count the numbers of different colored circles on the outside of the box.

After escaping the box, pairs find a map on the outside of the box and are instructed to meet host Rik van de Westelaken at the location on the map where the starting point of all five pairs intersect: VOC Vegetable Garden. All five pairs reaching the garden within the 45-minute time limit earns €4,000 for the pot; four pairs earn €2,000, three pairs earn €1,000; two pairs earn €500; one pair earn €250.

Toonaangevend

The group split into two groups of five: one group with a "musical ear" and the other group who can "immerse themselves in music".

The group who can immerse themselves in music have one hour to learn a song before performing it alongside members of the South African Youth Choir. During the performance, a judge attempts to distinguish the five candidates from the rest of the choir based on their singing. Each candidate not selected by the judge earns money for the pot.

Meanwhile, the group with a musical ear participate in five music-related challenges. The more successful they are, the more members from the South African Youth Choir will later participate with the other group during their performance, decreasing the overall probability of them being selected by the judge. They must also divide the €4,000 potential earnings between the five candidates from the other group, and that money is added to the pot if they later remain unselected by the judge.

=== Episode 2 - Kunstgreep ===
Episode 2 - Kunstgreep
Original airdates: 14 January 2023 Location: Saldanha, Western Cape
Assignment	Money earned	Possible earnings
Stalen zenuwen	€1,300.-	€3,000.-
Propvol	€250.-	€3,000.-
Current Pot	€4,800.-	€14,000.-
Execution
Froukje	2nd player executed	

Stalen zenuwen

Each candidate begins with two lives and must gather resources from the Saldanha Steel company and place them into a machine to convert into steel balls. Afterwards, they must balance the balls on a plate and deliver them into tubes upstairs. The more they fill the tubes, the more money they earn for the pot, with a maximum of €3,000. Throughout the challenge, an aerial drone may activate and attempt to hunt candidates down, causing them to lose lives. Candidates are eliminated from the challenge if they lose both lives and there is a 45-minute time limit for the assignment.

Meanwhile, Sarah is given a task which allows her to return to the game if successfully completed. She must decrease the amount the candidates earn for the pot at by least €1,500. She can do this by completing a wire loop game; the further she progresses in the game, the higher percentage she decreases the group's earnings by. However, each time Sarah touches the spiral, she activates a drone which temporarily hunts down the candidates and electric shocks them, making it harder for them to earn money. This, in turn, also makes it more difficult for her to complete her task successfully as her result depends on the money earned by the candidates.

€1,300 was earned for the pot and Sarah did not return to the game.

Propvol

The candidates travel in two vans to two different locations: one team travels to the Woodstock suburb of Cape Town and the other team travels to a film prop company.

The team in Woodstock is tasked with identifying six murals around the suburb and, for each correctly identified mural, they earn €250 for the pot. The team at the prop company must use the props to create photos that represent or resemble the correct murals. These photos are then sent to the team in Woodstock and this team can send a photo back for each mural that they have identified as correct. Both teams can only send six photos to the other team and the candidates are given 45 minutes for the task.

The teams identified one mural correctly. Afterwards, the team at the film prop company was also given the opportunity to double the winnings by solving a rebus. They were not able to solve the rebus successfully.

=== Episode 3 - Spelbreker ===
Episode 3 - Spelbreker
Original airdates: 21 January 2023 Location: Atlantis & Cape Town, Western Cape
Assignment	Money earned	Possible earnings
Om Leiding	€2,500.-	€2,500.-
Per Definitie	€750.-	€2,000.-
Het Schip Ingaan	€0.-	€2,000.-
Current Pot	€8,050.-	€20,500.-
Jokers
Annick & Jurre	Per Definitie	
Daniël, Jurre & Soy	Het Schip Ingaan	
Execution
Sander	3rd player executed	

Om Leiding

Candidates search the Atlantis Dunes on quad bikes for seven stations with three or four buttons on them. The three or four candidates assigned to the station must push the buttons simultaneously; the more players who press their button at each station, the more money the group earns for the pot. Each candidate has a 15-minute time limit for the challenge, however they can reset the limit by returning to the starting point throughout the assignment.

Per Definitie

Candidates are split into four pairs to compete for money and Jokers. Each round, pairs are shown an Afrikaans word and must create a fake definition for the word. Afterwards, all pairs are presented with each invented definition of the word alongside the actual definition, and attempt to select the correct definition. Each time a pair selects the correct definition, €50 is added to the pot. Each time a fake definition is chosen, the pair that created it earns a point; the pair that accumulates the most points by the end of the assignment earns two Jokers.

€750 was earned for the pot. Annick & Jurre accumulated the most points throughout the assignment and won the two Jokers.

Het Schip Ingaan

Candidates split into three groups and must search a ship docked at the Port of Cape Town for ice blocks with tagged keys inside. They must break the ice to retrieve the keys and use them to unlock boxes in the corresponding rooms. In each box is a clue to the codeword which candidates must guess by the end of the 30-minute time limit: schip. However, only one group may present host Rik van de Westelaken the codeword at the end of the assignment.

Daniël, Jurre & Soy were selected to present the codeword. After they were correct, they were offered a choice of either the €2,000 prize for the pot or three Jokers. They elected to take the Jokers meaning no money was earned for the pot.

=== Episode 4 - Weglopen ===
Episode 4 - Weglopen
Original airdates: 28 January 2023 Location: Tulbagh, Western Cape
Assignment	Money earned	Possible earnings
Padvinders	€300.-	€2,000.-
Een(d)zame Hoogte	€0.-	€3,000.-
Current Pot	€8,350.-	€25,500.-
Execution
Annick	4th player executed	

Padvinders

One candidate at a time enters a maze to find as many packing slips as possible, and bring them out the end of the maze to add their monetary value to the pot. In the maze are also buttons which activate a birds-eye view of the maze when pressed for the remaining candidates to see on a screen, allowing them to help direct the candidate in the maze via walkie talkie.

Throughout the assignment, various doors within the maze open and close, potentially altering the paths candidates can take. Additionally, there is an opponent in the maze attempting to capture candidates; if candidates are caught, the slips they possess become void. There is a combined 45-minute time limit for all seven candidates.

Een(d)zame Hoogte

In the morning, the group must select five candidates to want to make a physical effort for money and the remaining two to stay behind at the hotel.

The five candidates to want to make a physical effort for money must push an oversized duck figurine to the top of a three-kilometre hill to open a box worth €3,000. In the box is also an envelope; unbeknownst to the five candidates, the €3,000 is only earned if the envelope is not opened.

The remaining two candidates attempt to inform the other group not to open the envelope. They must first search among dozens of rubber ducks in a pool for two with coordinates on them, then drive to that location to meet a pilot. There, one of them must enter the plane and direct the pilot to circle above the candidates from the other group so they can notice the phone number printed on the plane’s wing. The other candidate remains on the ground with a phone.

The five candidates pushing the duck can call the number on the wing of the plane to be informed not to open the envelope. If they reach the top of the hill and do not open the envelope in the box, the €3,000 is added to the pot. However, the five candidates ended up opening the envelope meaning no money was earned for the pot.

Episode 4 execution

After the quiz, each candidate views their results in front of the group, but with the screen facing away so that only they can see if they receive a red or green screen. Afterwards, the group must divide seven briefcases ranging from €0 to €2,500 among themselves, based on their reactions to seeing their results. If the candidate who saw a red screen receives one of the three highest-value briefcases, they are saved and the candidate with the second-lowest score in the quiz is eliminated instead; otherwise, they are eliminated. The eliminated contestant also deducts the money listed on their briefcase from the pot.

It was revealed that the candidate who had a red screen (Daniël, Nabil or Soy — revealed in episode 9 to be Soy) saved himself by claiming one of the three highest-value briefcases. The second-lowest scoring candidate on the quiz, Annick, was eliminated in his place. As Annick possessed the €0 briefcase, no money was deducted from the pot.

=== Episode 5 - Portretten ===
Episode 5 - Portretten
Original airdates: 4 February 2023 Location: Matjiesfontein & Tulbagh, Western Cape
Assignment	Money earned	Possible earnings
Altaar Ego	€700.-	€2,000.-
Verschijning	−€2,250.-	€9,500.-
Current Pot	€6,800.-	€37,000.-
Jokers
Anke, Jurre & Nabil	Verschijning	

Altaar Ego

The four candidates with the four lowest-value briefcases from the last execution split into two pairs for the assignment. One pair stays inside a church with a seating plan, describing characteristics of the 20 churchgoers attending an upcoming church service. The other pair must ask the churchgoers questions as they arrive to obtain biographical information about them, and relay this information to the pair inside the church so they can identify each churchgoer and allocate them their correct seat upon arrival. For each churchgoer correctly seated, €100 is added to the pot.

Verschijning

After Annick’s execution, the candidates with the two highest-value briefcase at the execution (Nabil & Soy) are given a chance to double the combined €4,750 in their briefcases. They are told the remaining four candidates will get to select between two envelopes: one with a euro sign and one with a Joker sign on it. They must assign each envelope either money or a Joker, which the four remaining candidates later choose between.

The following day, candidates arrive at Lord Milner Hotel and are informed about the legend of "Katie", a deceased woman who is said to haunt the hotel to this day. Afterwards, "Katie" instructs the group to figure out a characteristic for each candidate by midnight to give them the ability to later earn money for the pot. To figure out the characteristics, the group must select three candidates to remain in the hotel and solve a series of clues to find six portraits depicting each candidate at a specific location. They then had to relay the locations to the remaining three candidates, who must go to each location and decipher a morse code light sequence to figure out the characteristic of that candidate.

Each candidate that figures out their characteristic participates in the next part of the assignment. There, the candidates with the four lowest-value briefcases at the previous execution can select between the envelope with the euro sign or the Joker to earn its contents that Nabil & Soy previously assigned. If they select the envelope with the Joker inside, they earn the Joker for themselves and the money from the other envelope is deducted from the pot. If they select the envelope with money, the money is doubled for the pot and Nabil & Soy earn one Joker collectively. Nabil & Soy can also advise candidates on which envelope to select.

Anke and Jurre selected the envelope with the Joker in it, claiming the Jokers for themselves. As Ranomi's characteristic was not found, the money in the envelope she potentially could have selected was also deducted from the pot. Daniël elected to claim the money, meaning Nabil & Soy collectively earned one Joker, which Soy later conceded to Nabil. Overall, €2,250 was deducted from the pot.

=== Episode 6 - Lijdensweg? ===
Episode 6 - Lijdensweg?
Original airdates: 11 February 2023 Location: Karoo & Oudtshoorn, Western Cape
Assignment	Money earned	Possible earnings
Stoelendans?	€0	€6,000.-
Current Pot	€6,800.-	€43,000.-
Exemptions
Daniël & Jurre	Stoelendans?	
Execution
Nabil	5th player executed	

Before the next assignment, candidates completed the first 15 questions of the execution quiz.

Stoelendans?

Candidates travel in two cars, which form their group for the assignment, on a two-day road trip through Karoo to the Cango Caves where the execution takes place. Along the way, each group encounters three challenges to earn money for the pot.

At the first challenge, each group must use wooden planks to cross a course of ostrich eggs without touching the ground within 15 minutes to earn €1,000 for the pot. The following day, each group encounters the next two challenges. At one challenge, groups find five ostrich pictures and must look into holes to find several pictures of ostriches and determine which picture is present three times. If groups select the correct ostrich, they earn €1,000 for the pot. At the other challenge, groups have 15 minutes to catch flying arrows and shoot them at six ostrich eggs using a bow. In one of the eggs is €1,000, which is added to the pot if the respective egg is hit.

Each group also encounters two decision points during the trip. At each decision point, each group find three closed chests with their names on them. They can choose to spend €500 to buy one candidate’s chest at each point, if they wish, before continuing with the trip.

Upon arrival at the Cango Caves, the results of the assignment are announced. Both groups earned €2,000 collectively but also spent €2,000 total to buy four chests, meaning no money was earned for the pot.

Each candidate that bought a chest (Anke, Nabil, Ranomi and Soy) could then open them, where they found chairs inside — the same chairs which candidates sit on while awaiting their results at the execution. As Daniël and Jurre did not buy a chest containing a chair, they could not attend the execution and were declared exempt. Anke, Nabil, Ranomi and Soy then had to finish the remaining five questions of the quiz before attending the execution ceremony.

=== Episode 7 - Inzichtelijk ===
Episode 7 - Inzichtelijk
Original airdates: 18 February 2023 Location: Wilderness, Western Cape
Assignment	Money earned	Possible earnings
Uitvlakken	€1,000.-	€3,000.-
Zandlopers	€600.-	€1,935.-
Current Pot	€8,400.-	€47,935.-
Jokers
Jurre, Ranomi & Soy	Uitvlakken	
Execution
Anke	6th player executed	

Uitvlakken

Each candidate must complete a paraglide and land in one of five squares to claim its contents. Square 1 earns €1,000 for the pot; Square 2 earns €2,000 for the pot; Square 3 earns one Joker; Square 4 earns two Jokers; Square 5 earns five Jokers. However, the contents are only earned if only one candidate lands in the square, or two candidates for Square 2, otherwise the contents become void. Additionally, candidates are only given three minutes to discuss which square they land in before completing the paraglide.

€1,000 was earned for the pot. Jurre, Ranomi and Soy earned one, two and three Jokers respectively. Ranomi and Soy later gave one Joker each to Daniël and Anke respectively.

Zandlopers

The remaining five candidates compete individually to win €1,935 and a chance to speak to the Mole. Candidates begin attached to a rope and must unspool enough rope to reach a key and unlock themselves. They must then follow a set of cardinal directions to solve a number code to unlock a box containing a grappling hook, which they must use to hook one of three shovels. The three candidates who obtain shovels advance to the next portion of the assignment where they must dig in a marked square for €1,935, divided among seven capsules. The first candidate to find all seven capsules wins the chance to speak to the Mole.

Jurre won the challenge, earning €1,935 and the chance to speak to the Mole (via phone in a disguised voice) the following day. The following day, the Mole revealed to Jurre that on the banknotes of the €1,935 he earned were questions of future quizzes, written in one of the official languages of South Africa. He could spend part or all of the earned €1,935 to have several questions translated by the Mole.

Jurre decided to spend €1,335 to have questions translated meaning in total, €600 was earned for the pot.

Analoge Test

Instead of a traditional computer-based execution quiz, candidates must search a hedge maze for the quiz questions on a clipboard and answer them with a marker, effectively meaning that their answers are visible to all candidates who later encounter the question. Candidates are allowed to leave the maze at any time, without necessarily having answered all their questions, and proceed to the center of the maze to have their time stopped by taking a seat at the Execution.

=== Episode 8 - Brandpunt ===
Episode 8 - Brandpunt
Original airdates: 25 February 2023 Locations: Garden Route & De Rust, Western Cape
Assignment	Money earned	Possible earnings
Focusgroep	€0.-	€2,000.-
Vuurproef	€2,250.-	€3,000.-
Current Pot	€10,650.-	€52,935.-
Exemption
Jurre	Focusgroep	

Focusgroep

Each candidate selects one of four sealed envelopes containing either €0, €1,000, €2,000 or an exemption. After a brief photography workshop, candidates undergo a two-hour game drive through the Botlierskop Private Game Reserve and must photograph the wildlife before compiling three of their photos to form a triptych at the end of the tour. Candidates then present their triptych to wildlife photographer Chris Fallows, who judges each candidate's work. The candidate who receives the highest score wins the ability to claim the contents of their own, or potentially another candidate's, envelope.

Jurre received the highest score. He could then watch Daniël, Ranomi and Soy open their envelopes then decide whether to keep the contents of his envelopes or swap, based on their reactions to seeing the contents inside. Jurre decided to swap with Soy, who revealed he had the envelope with the exemption, meaning that Jurre claimed the exemption and no money was added to the pot.

Episode 8 test

Candidates sit the 20-question execution test, but would find that the final five questions of the test ask about two upcoming assignments. This means that the answers to those questions would be influenced based on actions of the Mole in these future assignments.

Vuurproef

Candidates take part in a laser game assignment at the Stompdrift Dam, where they attempt to unlock four cages to collect the money inside before they burst into flames at the end of 30 minutes. To do so, candidates must shoot at opponents; each time an opponent is hit, they drop a label tagged with the name of a country and year for a specific cage. Candidates must find the countries from the dropped labels on a world map, in chronological order, where the zone each country is located correspond to a series of cardinal directions needed to unlock the directional locks of cages. However, during the assignment, opponents also attempt to shoot at candidates and candidates are eliminated from the assignment if they are shot three times.

=== Episode 9 - Molafpraak ===
Episode 9 - Molafpraak
Original airdates: 4 March 2023 Locations: Mossel Bay & Tsitsikamma, Western Cape
Assignment	Money earned	Possible earnings
Abvallers	€1,000.-	€2,000.-
Van Ruilen Komt Huilen	€0.-	€2,500.-
Final Pot	€11,650.-	€57,435.-
Execution
Soy	7th player executed	

Abvallers

The group is presented with seven boxes of varying sizes, each marked with a different colored shape and some containing money; they can later open one box to claim its contents. To determine which box to open, each candidate first completes a 60-metre abseil one at a time. During the abseil, they receive six phone calls from the six eliminated candidates asking them a trivia question about a previous assignment of the season, where the answers correlate to clues about which box to open or avoid. After each candidate abseils, they can discuss the answers before collectively deciding on one box to open. The more questions candidates answer correctly, the greater chance they have of opening a box with money, with one box containing the maximum €2,000 if they follow all the clues correctly.

Episode 9 execution

Instead of occurring at the end of episode 8, the execution occurred midway through episode 9.

Van Ruilen Komt Huilen

The group undergoes a 10-minute speedboat ride. Throughout the ride, each candidate must put on, take off or exchange provided clothing items to match one of three outfit designs worth €500, €1,000 and €1,500. For each candidate who matches an outfit design by the end of the ride, its money value is added to the pot.

No money was earned for the pot, leaving the final pot at €11,650.

=== Episode 10 - Poker Face ===
Episode 10 - Poker Face
Original airdates: 11 March 2023
Location: Baarn, Netherlands
Runner-up
Ranomi Kromowidjojo
Winner
Daniël Verlaan
The Mole
Jurre Geluk

The finale was held at the Soestdijk Palace in Baarn, Netherlands. Jurre was revealed as the Mole, Ranomi finished as the runner-up and Daniël was declared the winner of the season.

== Mole activity ==
The following acts of sabotage were revealed in the finale:

Gulden Middenweg: After he and Sarah escaped their box and determined the location to meet Rik at, Jurre insisted to leave immediately instead of staying behind to help other pairs answer their questions, preventing them from escaping their boxes and reaching the VOC Vegetable Garden.

Toonaangevend: Jurre purposefully sang out of tune to get selected as a non-choir member by the judge, losing the €750 envelope the other group assigned to him.

Propvol: Jurre took many photos in a non-optimal orientation. He also hid a photo of an elephant which could have been a useful prop to depict the elephant mural.

Per Definitie: Jurre was given the true definition of each Afrikaans word beforehand and created fake definitions in advance. He also selected Annick as his teammate for the assignment as she was also good at creating fake definitions, allowing the pair to trick teams the most times to claim the Jokers.

Het Schip Ingaan: Jurre knew about the dilemma at the end of the assignment. Knowing that Daniël wanted to take the Jokers instead of the money, he pushed for the group of himself, Daniël and Soy to present the answer to Rik, where they ultimately took the Jokers.

Padvinders: Jurre decided to enter the maze second to allow himself to collect as many remaining packing slips as possible. As he knew the location of the opponent, he followed the maze to the opponent to allow himself to get caught and lose the €450 he was holding.

Een(d)zame Hoogte: While his group were trying to determine the number on the wing of the plane, Jurre encouraged them to instead bring the duck to the top of the hill first to avoid them contacting Annick and Daniël. He also ultimately opened the envelope, preventing the €3,000 from being added to the pot.

Altaar Ego: Jurre asked the churchgoers about information he knew would not be relevant, and also gave some false information to Daniël & Ranomi in the church. He also continuously dialled in on the walkie-talkie to cut Anke off while she was describing characteristics, meaning the information was not fully conveyed.

Verschijning: Jurre intentionally mistranslated the morse code for Ranomi's characteristic, meaning she could not participate in the second part of the assignment and potentially add money to the pot. He also elected to take envelope with the Joker instead of the money in the second part of the assignment.

Focusgroep: Jurre knew beforehand the contents of each envelope. After receiving the highest score for his photographs, he decided to switch envelopes with Soy, who he knew held the envelope with the exemption, preventing money from being added to the pot.

Abvallers: Jurre gave an incorrect clue about which box to open.

Van Ruilen Komt Huilen: Jurre sat at the back of the speedboat so the other two candidates could not see him sabotage. He also dropped several items into the water during the speedboat ride.

== Hidden clues ==
The following clues to the identity of the Mole were released on the show's website.

Gulden Middenweg: For the assignment, Jurre (and his teammate Sarah) began locked in the green box. Green is the color of the Wie is de Mol? logo and the Mole always receives a green screen.

Propvol: Jurre was in the group which created photos at film prop company. At the company, there was a box of wooden letters with the letters M, O and L, spelling "Mol" and indicating the Mole would be in the group there.

Per Definitie: Jurre came up with "model" as the fake meaning for Afrikaans word glansgans. Rearranged, the letters spell "De Mol" (the Mole).

Padvinders: The packing slips in the maze were of a company called "Mol Fruit". At the test for the episode, Jurre refers to himself as oenemeloen. When rearranged, the letters form the phrase "o nee een mol" (oh no a Mole).

Altaar Ego: Jurre described the clothing of one churchgoer with descriptions of his own clothing instead, because, like the fact that the churchgoer had to be identified, the Mole also had to be identified.

Verschijning: At the Lord Milner hotel, the hotel staff explain that if they say Katie's name three times, she will appear; during the assignment, Rik only says Jurre's name three times. Additionally, each candidate's trait the group had to decipher began with either S or E, a reference to the program Spuiten en Slikken which Jurre presents.

Recurring clues:

Jurre's surname is Geluk, which translates to both "luck" and "happiness".

- During the "Stoelendans?" assignment, Jurre says "luck kost geld" (luck costs money) during the dilemma.
- During the "Toonaangevend" assignment, Rik says to the judge "I wish you all the luck".
- The oversized yellow duck in the "Een(d)zame Hoogte" assignment is a reference to the cartoon character Guus Geluk, the Dutch version of Gladstone Gander who has good luck. Yellow is also the color of "happiness". In episodes 5 and 9, Jurre wears a shirt with a yellow duck on it.
- The phrase "poker face" is said various times throughout the season. The phrase references poker, a game of chance, where "luck" is needed.

== Reception ==
=== Viewing figures ===
Viewing Figures
#	Title	Air Date	Time Slot	Average	Total
1	Verbinding	7 January 2023	Saturday 20.30 CET	2,634,000	3,405,000
2	Kunstgreep	14 January 2023	Saturday 20.30 CET	2,546,000	3,216,000
3	Spelbreker	21 January 2023	Saturday 20.30 CET	2,420,000	3,020,000
4	Weglopen	28 January 2023	Saturday 20.30 CET	2,223,000	2,886,000
5	Portretten	4 February 2023	Saturday 20.30 CET	2,446,000	2,978,000
6	Lijdensweg?	11 February 2023	Saturday 20.30 CET	2,170,000	3,041,000
7	Inzichtelijk	18 February 2023	Saturday 20.30 CET	2,136,000	2,741,000
8	Brandpunt	25 February 2023	Saturday 20.30 CET	2,509,000	3,097,000
9	Molafpraak	4 March 2023	Saturday 20.30 CET	2,349,000	2,974,000
10	Poker Face	11 March 2023	Saturday 20.30 CET	3,081,000	4,143,000
