= Wie is de Mol? (Dutch TV series) season 22 =

Dutch reality television season

Wie is de Mol?
- Season 22
- Presented by: Rik van de Westelaken
- No. of contestants: 11
- Winner: Fresia Cousiño Arias
- Runner-up: Kim-Lian van der Meij
- Location: Albania
- The Mole: Everon Jackson Hooi
- No. of episodes: 10

Release
- Original network: AVROTROS (NPO 1)
- Original release: 1 January – 5 March 2022

Season chronology
- ← Previous; Season 21: Czech Republic Next → Season 23: South Africa

The twenty-second season of the Dutch TV series Wie is de Mol? ("Who is the Mole?") aired on 1 January 2022. This was the fifth season with Rik van de Westelaken as host. The candidates were announced on 28 August 2021 in a livestream on the Wie is De Mol website, during a live assignment in the first round of the season. During the livestream, candidates also had to appeal to the public stating that they are not the mole. The least suspected candidate would receive two exemptions, all before the first execution of the season.

On 15 November 2021, the location was revealed as Albania on the show's social media accounts. The season premiered on 1 January 2022. With the Reunion on 5 March 2021, which saw Fresia Cousiño Arias win against fellow finalist, Kim-Lian van der Meij, to successfully unmask actor Everon Jackson Hooi as the Mole. Hooi's reign as the Mole saw Arias win the new all-time lowest pot of €8,065, surpassing the record set by last year's Mole in Season 21 of €9,675. With the winnings of €8,065.-, Arias decided to donate a portion of the winnings to Season 21's winner, Rocky Hehakaija's charity organization.

== Format ==
Followed the same format as its Belgian predecessor, this season however, Eleven candidates were gathered to complete assignments to earn money for the group pot. However, one of the eleven is the titular Mole (de Mol), the one designated to sabotage the assignments and cause the group to earn the least amount of money for the winner's pot as possible. Every few days, players would take a 20-question multiple choice test about the identity of the Mole. Once the test is complete, the candidates await their results in an Execution ceremony. The candidate with the worst score is executed from the game, while in the event of the tie the candidate who completed their test the slowest is executed. The season plays out until there are three remaining candidates, where they must complete a final test (consisting of 40 questions). The candidate with the highest score, or who had completed their test the fastest in a tie, is declared the winner and receives the group's pot.

The season took place in Albania. This was the second season in Wie is de Mol? history to begin with eleven candidates, the last being Season 3 in 2002. The cast were revealed in a livestream during the production of the first episode on August 29, 2021, where they were tasked to plea their case to the audience that they were not the Mole to receive one of two exemptions from the first execution ceremony occurring that night. All executed candidates were invited to a masked ball in Tirana at the end of production filming, where the Mole was unmasked. A decision to prevent the Netherlands to discover the elimination order of the season post-livestream.

== Candidates ==
Name	Occupation	Day Exited	Result
Everon Jackson Hooi	Actor	18	The Mole
Fresia Cousiño Arias	Sports Presenter	18	Winner
Kim-Lian van der Meij	Actress	18	2nd place
Thomas van Luyn	Cabaret Performer	17	3rd place
Laetitia Gerards	Opera Singer	14	4th place
Sahil Amar Aïssa	Actor	12	5th place
Hila Noorzai	TV Journalist	10	6th place
Arno Kantelberg	Magazine Editor	8	7th place
Welmoed Sijtsma	Talk Show Presenter	6	8th place
Glen Faria	Rap Artist	4	9th place
Suzanne Klemann	Singer	2	10th place
the result in grey indicates the Mole

=== Future appearances ===
Sahil Amar Aïssa returned as a contestant for the special 25th anniversary season of Wie is de Mol? in 2025. He ended up in 6th place after being eliminated in the 5th episode, broadcast on November 29, 2025.

== Candidate progress ==
The order in which the candidates learned their results are indicated in the table below.

Summary of candidates progress in each episode
Candidate	1 (Note: As deemed the least suspicious candidate by the Netherlands watching the cast reveal Livestream, Glen was awarded two exemptions. One for himself, and one which he could award any candidate, including the most suspected candidate which was revealed as Arno. He gave the second exemption to Everon.)	2	3 (Note: Arno played an exemption, and Thomas used Jokers for the test, however Hila had played the Black Exemption. Nullifying all advantages for this test.)		4	5	6 (Note: Sahil had earned an exemption in the Vakbondje assignment, however, as he did not use it on any of the tests since, he was executed from the game with the exemption in his possession.)	7 (Note: As Thomas finished the Testafette assignment first, he got first pick of which laptop to use for the test. He picked the laptop with a Question Mark card next to it. At the execution, Rik revealed that due to his choice, his test results were not including in the Execution if he successfully predicted who, excluding himself, did the worst on the test. If he was correct, that candidate would be executed from the game, regardless of his own test results. If his prediction was incorrect, his results would be included in the Execution and would proceed as normal. Thomas predicted Laetitia did the worst, and was correct. Fresia submitted an Exemption before the assignment, thus excluded from the dilemma.)	8	Finale (Note: The two genuine Finalists, Fresia, and Kim-Lian had discovered in the Reunion that they tied on the Final Test. Both women had scored 34 out of 40, with the winner being determined by time. In the end, Fresia was 50 seconds faster in completing her test, and declared winner of Wie is de Mol 2022.)
Fresia			N/A		3rd	2nd		exempt	3rd	Winner
Everon	exempt		N/A	2nd		1st	2nd		1st	The Mole
Kim-Lian	3rd		N/A		1st		1st		2nd	Runner-Up
Thomas			N/A		2nd	3rd	3rd	exempt	Executed	
Laetitia			N/A	3rd	5th		exempt	Executed		
Sahil	2nd		N/A		4th		Executed			
Hila			B.Exempt	1st		Executed				
Arno	1st		~~Exempt~~	4th	Executed					
Welmoed			N/A	Executed						
Glen	exempt	Executed								
Suzanne	Executed									

The candidate saw a Green Screen to proceeded to the next Episode.
The candidate used Jokers for this test, and saw a Green Screen to proceed to the next Episode.
The candidate used Jokers for this test, however, they did not see a Green Screen before the Executed player saw their Red Screen. Thus they proceeded to the next Episode.
The candidate used a Black Exemption to nullify all Exemptions and Jokers for this test.
The candidate did not see a Green Screen before the Executed player saw their Red Screen. Thus they proceeded to the next Episode.
The candidate received an Exemption to automatically proceed to the next Episode.
The candidate was executed from the game and sent home.

== Episodes ==
For more information, see: List of seasons of "Wie is de Mol?" (in Dutch)

Episode	Air Date	Title	Amount in Pot (Note: Pot earnings: indicates an increase indicates no change indicates a decrease)	Location	Days	Eliminated
1	January 1, 2022	'De Tijd zal het Leren' (Time Will Tell)	€0 → €1,500	Shkodër, Shkodër County	1–2	Suzanne
2	January 8, 2022	'Zwijgen' (Stay Silent)	€1,500 → €3,410	Shkodër, Shkodër County & Shëngjin, Lezhë County	3–4	Glen
3	January 15, 2022	'Nietszeggend' (Meaningless)	€3,410 → €4,150	Shkodër, Shkodër County → Lezhë, Lezhë County	5–6	Welmoed
4	January 22, 2022	'Stemmen' (Voices/Voting)	€4,150 → €5,900 (Note: As a duo, Kim-Lian and Hila earned €250 each in Hoog Spel Spelen. However, Kim-Lian chose not to reveal her €250 to the rest of the group. Thus it is not acknowledged in the Pot Total.)	Lezhë, Lezhë County → Vlorë, Vlorë County → Fier, Fier County	7–8	Arno
5	January 29, 2022	'Kettingreactie' (Chain Reaction)	€5,900 → €9,450	Vlorë, Vlorë County → Sarandë, Vlorë County	9–10	Hila
6	February 5, 2022	'Golfbeweging' (Wave Motion)	€9,350 (Note: Between Episode 5 and Episode 6, €100 went missing without explanation. In Episode 10, it was revealed that the Candidates had lost the money in their bus at that time, and it never found its way back into the pot.) → €12,060	Sarandë, Vlorë County	11–12	Sahil
7	February 12, 2022	'Coulissen' (Theatre Wing)	€12,060 → €12,095	Sarandë, Vlorë County → Gjirokastër, Gjirokastër County	13–14	Laetitia
8	February 19, 2022	'Mollenvanger' (Mole Catcher)	€12,095 → €13,040	Gjirokastër, Gjirokastër County → Durrës, Durrës County → Tirana, Tirana County	15–17	Thomas
9	February 26, 2022	'Bedriegen' (Deceive)	€13,040 → €13,335	Tirana, Tirana County	17–19	—N/a (Note: No one got eliminated because the remaining contestants were the finalists of the season.)
10	March 5, 2022	'De Ontmaskering' (The Unmasking)	€13,335 → €8,065 (Note: Because Everon received an Exemption in Episode 1, the winner's pot lost €5,000 when it was revealed that Everon was the Mole 2022.) (Note: Towards the end of the Season, Kim-Lian revealed to Everon the missing €250, and an additional €20 she stole during the Alarmerend assignment. As the Mole, Everon flushed the money Kim-Lian returned to get rid of the evidence, thus removing it from the final winner's pot as well.)	Amsterdam, Netherlands	Runner-up	Kim-Lian
10	March 5, 2022	'De Ontmaskering' (The Unmasking)	€13,335 → €8,065	Amsterdam, Netherlands	Winner	Fresia
10	March 5, 2022	'De Ontmaskering' (The Unmasking)	€13,335 → €8,065	Amsterdam, Netherlands	The Mole	Everon

== Season summary ==
=== Episode 1 - De Tijd zal het Leren ===
Episode 1 - De tijd zal het leren
Original airdates: 1 January 2022 Locations: Shkodër, Shkodër County
Assignment	Money earned	Possible earnings
(Af)troeven	€0.-	€1,500.-
Avondklok	€1,500.-	€1,500.-
Ontmaskerd?	TBA	€5,000.-
Current Pot	€1,500.-	€8,000.-
Exemptions
Glen, Everon	Ontmaskerd?	
Jokers
Laetitia, Welmoed (Note: During the (Af)troeven assignment, Arno, Laetitia and Welmoed broke a key while unlocking one of the boxes during the assignment. However, Laetitia and Welmoed noticed the box had partially opened at that point and could still grab the three Jokers inside. They decided to not reveal this at the conclusion of the assignment and used a Joker each for the first execution test. Welmoed used the last Joker for the second execution test.)	(Af)troeven	
Execution
Suzanne	1st player executed	

(Af)troeven ((Take) Trumps)

Each candidate meets with host Rik van de Westelaken at Rozafa Castle. They are asked which candidate believe is the Mole based on videos of candidates during the show's casting process, which they were shown during the car ride to the assignment location. After answering, they are told which group the Mole designated them to for the first assignment – aftroeven (Taking Trumps) or troeven (Trumps).

Each group has 20 minutes to complete six puzzle-or-obstacle-based tasks within the courtyard of the castle. Each task involves obtaining a key to unlock a box by various means and most tasks need two or more candidates at once to complete. For the aftroeven group, each box contains various amounts of money for the pot. For the troeven group, each box contains various Jokers, with the first candidate to physically grab each Joker when the box is opened being recognised as its holder.

After the assignment, the two groups were told to reveal what they had earned, where troven group obtained seven Jokers and the aftroeven group earned €1,400. The aftroeven group were then given the choice to add the money to the pot, or force the troven group to return the Jokers at the price of €200 per joker. They decided to spend all €1,400, requiring all seven Jokers to be returned to Rik; therefore, no money was earned for the pot.

After the money was relinquished, it was then revealed that a clue to the identity of the Mole was printed on those specific banknotes.

Avondklok (Evening Clock)

Around the castle grounds are three tablets displaying the current time of 9:00pm, and would stop displaying the time at 9:35pm. At each tablet are also three hourglasses measuring unknown times. Candidates had to figure out the times that each hourglass measures and use them to measure time after the tablets stopped displaying the time. They had to stop the time on the tablet within 10 minutes of 11:22pm to complete the assignment. For each tablet stopped between 11:12pm and 11:32pm, €500 would be earned for the pot.

€1,500.- was earned for the pot.

Ontmaskerd? (Unmasked?)

Prior to the execution, each candidate has one minute to present a speech to the public as to why they are not the Mole. The speeches would be given during a livestream event to the Dutch viewing public – which occurred live on 29 August 2021 – on the show's website. The viewers then had to vote for the candidate they thought was the Mole. The candidate who receives the most votes would be deemed the "most suspicious" while the candidate who receives the fewest votes would be deemed "least suspicious". The least suspicious candidate would receive an exemption for themselves and the ability to award a second candidate an exemption. If the Mole is voted as the "least suspicious", or given the second exemption by the least suspicious candidate, the group will lose €5,000 from the pot in the finale. If the "most suspicious" candidate makes it to the finale and revealed as the Mole, the group earns €5,000 for the pot.

Arno received the most votes and was deemed the "most suspicious" candidate. Glen received the fewest votes and was deemed the "least suspicious" candidate; he was awarded an exemption for himself and granted the second exemption to Everon.

=== Episode 2 - Zwijgen ===
Episode 2 - Zwijgen
Original airdates: 8 January 2022 Locations: Shkodër, Shkodër County - Shëngjin, Lezhë County
Assignment	Money earned	Possible earnings
Binnen en Buiten Bereik	€310.-	€2,500.-
Prikactie	€800.-	€3,000.-
Ver Gelijken	€800.-	€1,800.-
Current Pot	€3,410.-	€15,300.-
Execution
Glen (Note: As Glen won an Exemption in Ontmaskerd? His execution from the game reduced the chance of the group losing €5000 from the final pot; unless Everon is revealed to be the Mole.)	2nd player executed	

Binnen en Buiten Bereik (In and Out of Range)

Candidates form two groups: five candidates who want to "stay within reach" and five candidates who want to "stay out of reach". The five candidates who want to "stay out of reach" must stand around a rotating Lazy Susan-style turntable on the main stage of Migjeni Theater, which have several task stations on them. As the turntable rotates, they must complete as many tasks as possible in 10 minutes. After their time expires, the group who wants to "stay within reach" have 10 minutes to continue the tasks that the first group had not finished. However, this time they must stand on the turntable as it rotates. Tasks are worth varying amounts of money.

€310.- was earned for the pot.

Prikactie (Prick Action)

Two candidates at a time begins on the back of a Jeep. As the Jeep drives down Rana e Hedshun beach, they must use a spear to pop as many green balloons as possible that the vehicle passes. Before they begin, the Jeeps would complete a practice lap of the course and candidates are not allowed to pop balloons during this lap. Each green balloon popped earns €10 for the pot, however if candidates pop the nearby red balloons then they lose €10 per balloon. Along the course are also gold balloons which only the final two candidates can pop to earn €150 for the pot each.

At the conclusion of the assignment, it was revealed the group earned €890 for the pot. However, they were penalized €90 as Thomas had popped balloons during the practice lap, reducing their earnings to €800.

Ver Gelijken (To Compare)

The group had to select two candidates who would use Gjon Mili’s lighting techniques. They had 30 minutes to create eight light paintings representing the remaining eight candidates. Each of the remaining eight candidates that correctly identified which light painting represented them would increase the amount that the reconstruction of photos would earn for their part of the assignment.

The eight remaining candidates had to divide themselves into three groups and each group had memorize one of three Pietro Marubi photos within a room of the Marubi National Museum of Photography. In 30 minutes, each photo had to be recreated using any items they could find or obtain around Shkodër. Prior to the assignment, the Mole selected which items or stylistic elements had to be in candidate’s recreation of the three photos. For each selected item or element deemed present in the recreations, the group could earn up to €225 based on how many of the eight candidates correctly identified themselves in the light paintings.

€800.- was earned for the pot.

=== Episode 3 - Nietszeggend ===
Episode 3 - Nietszeggend
Original airdates: 15 January 2022 Locations: Shkodër, Shkodër County - Lezhë, Lezhë County
Assignment	Money earned	Possible earnings
Net of Net Niet	€0.-	€7,500.-
Waar Rook Is, Is Vuur	€740.-	€2,000.-
Vakbondje	€0.-	€6,000.-
Current Pot	€4,150.-	€30,800.-
Black Exemption
Hila (Note: Arno's Exemption, and two of Thomas' Jokers were nullified by Hila's Black Exemption used at this Execution.)	Vakbondje	
Exemptions
~~Arno~~, Fresia, Laetitia & Sahil (Note: Fresia, Laetitia and Sahil all chose to keep their Exemptions they earned instead of using them for this Execution.)	Vakbondje	
Jokers
~~Thomas~~	Vakbondje	
Execution
Welmoed	3rd player executed	

Net of Net Niet (Just or Just Not)

Candidates have 20 minutes to launch several balls into floating targets using a slingshot. Meanwhile, candidates who are not firing could enter Lake Shkodër where the targets are located to collect and return any balls that missed the targets. Each ball that landed inside a green target would earn money for the pot, however any balls that land in the nearby red target would deduct money from the pot.

No money was earned for the pot.

Waar Rook Is, Is Vuur (Where There's Smoke, There's Fire)

Candidates participate in a laser-game to earn money spread across a former cable factory. Three candidates at a time enter the factory and search for a box containing money which can be unlocked with their unique fingerprint. They must then take the money and return it to base to add it to the pot. During the assignment, there are opponents that can remove candidates’ lives by shooting them with a laser-gun. Any candidate who loses two lives are out of the game and lose any money they possess, however they can add up to two extra lives by pressing a red button found in the middle of the area. The time-limit is 45 minutes.

€740.- was earned for the pot.

Vakbondje (Little Unions)

As the group's treasurer, Hila is told she has no chance of an exemption and is separated from the group. She is then given the chance to earn a "black exemption" (an advantage that nullifies all Jokers and exemptions used during a test) by randomly selecting one of four envelopes. One of the envelopes contains the black exemption; however, she could spend €500 to only have to select from three envelopes, or €1,500 to only have to select from two envelopes for the black exemption.

The remaining eight candidates would be split into four pairs and would encounter a dilemma within the Skanderbeg Memorial. Each candidate begins with seven panels in front of them and each panel lists a different prize. The prizes are: (1) €1,000 for the pot; (2) One Joker; (3) 2 Jokers; (4) €1,500 for the pot;(5) 3 Jokers;(6) one exemption; (7) both one exemption. On Rik's go, each candidate would hold a bag of sand and step onto the first panel. They then had 30 seconds to decide whether or not to drop the bag of sand onto the panel to claim its prize. If they did, their opponent would be left with nothing. If neither player claimed the prize, they would both step onto the next panel and the process repeats. If both players reach the 7th and final panel, they would both receive an exemption.

Hila elected to spend €1,500.- to only have to select between two envelopes for the black exemption, which she successfully found. During her turn with Kim-Lian, Welmoed collected €1,500.- meaning that in total, no money was earned for the pot.

=== Episode 4 - Stemmen ===
Episode 4 - Stemmen
Original airdates: 22 January 2022 Locations: Lezhë, Lezhë County - Vlorë, Vlorë County - Fier, Fier County
Assignment	Money earned	Possible earnings
Luid Spreker	€150.-	€2,000.-
Hoog Spel Spelen	€500.- (Note: Kim-Lian earned €250 in this assignment, but chose not to reveal it and add it to the pot. The total amount earned reflects her decision.)	€2,000.-
Huis(ont)houden	€1,100.-	€2,000.-
Current Pot	€5,900.-	€36,800.-
Jokers
Arno, Everon, Fresia, Laetitia, ~~Sahil~~ & Thomas (Note: Revealed after the Execution, Sahil had given the Joker he received in Hoog Spel Spelen to Arno for safekeeping. However, Arno was executed from the game with his own and Sahil's Jokers in his possession, removing Sahil's Joker from the game.)	Hoog Spel Spelen	
Execution
Arno (Note: With Arno being the Netherlands' biggest suspect in the Ontmaskerd? Livestream, his execution meant the group would not earn €5000 towards the final pot.)	4th player executed	

Luid Sprekers (Loud Speakers)

The Candidates were taking to a former Fertilizer Silo in Vlorë and divided into duos. Standing across from their respective partners, all the candidates had 5 minutes to make sure their partners remembered words from their own sheets. Candidates could only speak when a siren allows them to speak. If a Candidate speaks after the siren to stop speaking plays, €100 is removed from the pot per mistake. At the end of the assignment, if any candidate remembers specific numbers that were spoken during the assignment, that value would be added to the pot.

The number, 134, was correctly remembered, with Rik rounding the value up to 150. €150 was earned for the pot.

Hoog Spel Spelen (High Gameplay)

During lunch, the candidates were informed to make duos before returning to the Fertilizer Silos. The duos were split into two groups, the first remained on the ground, while the second were taken to the top of a Silo and given the option to abseil down. The group on the ground were given three options to predict what their duo partner in the Silo would do. Abseil normally down the Silo, Abseil upside down, or refuse to Abseil. They had to assign €250 or 2 jokers or nothing into three boxes representing the Abseiling choices. Whatever the Abseiling partner did, would be theirs to keep. The groups swap places once the first four have decided on their Abseiling choice.

€750.- was earned for the pot, however, only €500.- was added to the pot as Kim-Lian refused to reveal €250 that she earned with Hila.

Huis(ont)houden (Housekeeping/Remember Housekeeping)

In the city of Berat, Berat County, the Candidates formed duos again and dropped off at 4 different houses. With a time limit of 15 minutes, two duos had to describe the interiors of their respective houses to the other. Afterwards, the duos could study while travelling to the others' house and look for 5 differences made during the swap.

Returning to Rik, each duo had to make 5 guesses of differences made in their partnering duo's interior, adding €100 per correct difference spotted. The group managed to correctly identify 11 differences among the 4 houses, thus €1,100 was earned for the pot.

=== Episode 5 - Kettingreactie ===
Episode 5 - Kettingreactie
Original airdates: 29 January 2022 Locations: Vlorë, Vlorë County - Sarandë, Vlorë County
Assignment	Money earned	Possible earnings
Uit de Lucht Gegrepen	€750.-	€2,000.-
Zwanenmeer	€800.-	€3,000.-
Tijdsbeeld	€2,000.-	€2,000.-
Current Pot	€9,450.-	€43,800.-
Jokers
Everon, Fresia & Laetitia	Hoog Spel Spelen	
Execution
Hila	5th player executed	

Uit de Lucht Gegrepen (Caught from the Air)

The night before, the candidate in possession of the Mole phone, and their roommate were instructed to leave the hotel earlier than the rest of the group for the Divjakë-Karavasta National Park. The five remaining candidates were then taken to the park's lagoon to be chained in five separate locations. The two earlier candidates were given six bags, which they had to deliver to the chained candidates along the lagoon. Using two motorized Gliders, they had to drop the bags to give the chained candidates clues on how to find a key to unlock themselves. Once unlocked, they can approach a locked box with a riddle hiding a four digit combination. Inside the box are instructions they must share over a walkie-talkie radio on where another candidate can find money buried near where they were chained. The Glider duo were given five black bags, and one pink bag, which they could drop for a candidate of their choosing to double their earnings. All chained candidates that could free themselves and find their buried money could ride a water taxi back to Rik. All freed candidates that reached Rik within 45 minutes would add their money to the pot.

Two candidates arrived in time, with one holding a Doubler from a pink bag. €750 was earned for the pot.

Zwanenmeer (Swan Lake)

Traveling to Lake Butrint near Sarandë, the candidates formed three duos to ride tandem hydrocycles. In 30 minutes, each duo had to ride upon the lake to retrieve inflatable swans that had correct statements relating to each of the duos. The seventh candidate was given a different criteria, where they had to find and retrieve swans that had various amounts of money attached to them. If they returned to the shore in time, the total amount of money the seventh candidate collected would be what the group earns for every correct statement linked to each duo retrieved by the end of the assignment.

With 14 correct statements retrieved and Thomas retrieving €57 as the solo candidate, the group earned €798; Rik rounded up the total, thus €800 was earned for the pot.

Tijdsbeeld (Image of Time)

Later at the Butrint National Park, the Candidates were informed of Albania's complicated history as a nation amidst an ancient city ruins. Placed in 5 locations around the park, stood 5 pillars, and 5 sculptures, that were in the wrong positions. With hints given at each location, the candidates had 45 minutes to move the pillars and sculptures to their rightful locations in the park. Rik provided the group with two choices. They could earn €200 per correct pillar and/or Sculpture at the correct location, or €2000 for everything in the correct position or nothing at all.

The group bet all or nothing on the assignment, which they completed just in time. €2,000 was earned for the pot.

=== Episode 6 - Golfbeweging ===
Episode 6 - Golfbeweging
Original airdates: 5 February 2022 Locations: Sarandë, Vlorë County
Assignment	Money earned	Possible earnings
Pot Count	-€100.- (Note: Between Episode 5 and 6, €100.- went missing from the Pot Count without explanation.)	N/A
In Het Verschiet	€1,400.-	€3,500.-
Reddingsactie	€1,310.-	€1,740.-
Current Pot	€12,060.-	€49,040.-
Exemptions
Laetitia	Vakbondje	
Execution
Sahil (Note: Despite earning an exemption in Vakbondjes, Sahil had not used it up until this test and execution. His execution meant leaving the game with the unused exemption in his possession.)	6th player executed	

In Het Verschiet (In the Offing)

Over a two part assignment, the candidates were divided into two groups of three: A group who would determine how much money could be earned, and a group who were not afraid of water and the dark who would retrieve the money. Starting at the Porto Palermo Castle, the first group are tasked with finding 4 keys hidden inside. The 4 keys would unlock 4 chests with bow and arrows, for which they would have to fire the arrows into the Porto Palermo Bay for the second group. The arrows give the second group a series of code combinations to use for their part of the assignment.

The second group must retrieve the arrows shot from the castle, before taken by speedboat to a former Russian Submarine base nearby. Using SUPs and magnets, they must paddle inside the entrance of the base to retrieve locked boxes on the sea floor. However, whenever the candidates pull the locked boxes above the water surface, two lifeguards inside the base will attempt to steal or knock off the boxes back into the water.

The candidates have an hour to complete the entire assignment and unlock as many locked boxes as possible. Out of the 6 locked boxes found in the Submarine base, only 4 were open in time. €1,400 was earned for the pot.

Reddingsactie (Rescue Action)

The next day the candidates were taken to the beach in Sarandë, where Rik informed them that they were going to play a complicated Tower of Hanoi puzzle using four sets of lifebuoys off shore. Off shore were 4 boats anchored with 5 lifebuoys of various amounts of money attached to their sides. The candidates were tasked to make sure all the boats had a total of €435 hanging off their sides. Starting with the smallest amount closest to the boat, to the largest hanging further away. With only 5 jetskis available, the last remaining candidate is stationed on a small dinghy with a map indicating the amounts of each boat. Each candidate on a jetski could only hold one lifebuoy at a time during the assignment. The candidates have 30 minutes to get as many correct totals on each of the boats.

With 3 out of the 4 boats having correctly hung lifebuoys, the group earned €1,305; Rik rounded up the total, thus €1,310 was earned for the pot.

=== Episode 7 - Coulissen ===
Episode 7 - Coulissen
Original airdates: 12 February 2022 Locations: Sarandë, Vlorë County - Gjirokastër, Gjirokastër County
Assignment	Money earned	Possible earnings
Vakmanscha(a)p	-€815.-	€2,000.-
De Boot Missen?	€850.-	€1,500.-
Testafette	N/A	N/A
Current Pot	€12,095.-	€52,540.-
Exemptions
Fresia	Vakbondje	
Thomas (Note: For choosing to take his test with a Question Mark next to his laptop, Thomas was given a dilemma. Rik informed him that his test results were excluded from the Execution, and would remain that way if he correctly predicts who among the rest of the candidates did the worst on the test. If he was correct, that candidate would be executed from the game. If he was incorrect, his results would be included and the Execution would continue as normal. Thomas was correct, and essentially secured himself an exemption at a same time.)	Testafette	
Execution
Laetitia	7th player executed	

Vakmanscha(a)p (Craftsmansheep)

In the neighbouring village of Ksamil, the candidates were taken to an old Roman footpath where 5 pens of sheep were kept. In half an hour, the candidates had to move and sort the sheep into their correct corresponding pens, split across a couple hundred meters away from each other. The pens and sheep were categorized by the Candidates' names.

For every correct sheep herded into the correct pen, €15 would be added to the pot. For every incorrect sheep in one of the pens, €50 would be removed from the pot. An additional rule placed by Rik was that for the entire assignment, the Candidates would be fined €50 everytime someone used the word, "Sheep."

Out of 100 sheep, the candidates managed to herd 29 into the correct pens, however, 19 sheep were also in the wrong pens. Additionally, the Candidates broke the "Sheep" rule 6 times, thus €815 was removed for the pot at the end of the assignment.

De Boot Missen? (Missed the Boat?)

The Candidates were taken to Ksamil beach, where each were offered a boat ride with the possibility of earning an Exemption for the Finale. While on the boat ride along the shore, the Candidates were given a camera to photograph 6 Milly's and Molly's. Tourists on the beach wearing Blue and White striped swimming outfits. For every correct photograph, the candidate would earn €50 for the pot. However, if a Candidate photographs a Crook, dressed in a yellow and black outfit, they would earn nothing for their ride. The Candidates could only take 6 photographs each for the assignment.

Only one Candidate photographed the Crook on the beach, nullifying their earnings, while the remaining Candidates managed to get 17 photographs altogether, thus €850 was earned for the pot.

Testafette

Arriving the following day at the Gjirokastër Fortress in Gjirokastër, Rik informed the Candidates that they were about to take the next test. Starting at the same time, the Candidates have to complete 3 small tasks in the Castle Courtyard before they were allowed to pick which laptop they could write the test. The tasks in order were: 1. Construct a pole high enough to retrieve small pouches hanging above on the Courtyard structure. 2. Using metal pellets from the pouches and a slingshot, shoot and break 3 glass bottles against the Courtyard wall. 3. Solve a small 3D Cube puzzle.

Once a Candidate has completed all three tasks, they were given the option of 5 laptops to choose from. One laptop held a Question Mark card; one laptop had nothing; and the three remaining would add 1, 2, or 3 minutes to the Candidate's test time if chosen. Any Candidates that held an Exemption and chose to use it, could skip the assignment completely and proceed to the next Episode. Fresia chose to use her Exemption, skipping the entire assignment.

After the Candidates had completed their tests, Rik informed the Candidate who picked the Question Mark laptop that their results were not currently included in the Execution ceremony. If they want to keep it that way, they had to pick one of the remaining Candidates who they thought did the worst on the test. If the Candidate they picked received a Red Screen, they would be executed from the game. However, if the prediction is incorrect, the Question Mark Candidate's results would be added to the Execution ceremony as usual, leaving them at risk of being executed from the game again. Thomas had picked the Question Mark laptop, and picked Laetitia. His selection was correct, granting himself a retrospective Exemption and sending Laetitia home.

=== Episode 8 - Mollenvanger ===
Episode 8 - Mollenvanger
Original airdates: 19 February 2022 Locations: Gjirokastër, Gjirokastër County - Durrës, Durrës County - Tirana, Tirana County
Assignment	Money earned	Possible earnings
Carpet Diem	€445.-	€2,500.-
Heftig	€0.-	€1,500.-
Zand Erover	€500.-	€2,000.-
Current Pot	€13,040.-	€58,540.-
Execution
Thomas	8th player executed	

Carpet Diem

Standing in the city center of Gjirokastër, Rik informed the candidates about the town's fame for its rugs. Starting with a large rug in the city center, the candidates were given 45 minutes to cover as much of the streets with rugs from the local shops as possible. For every linear meter the candidates cover with the rugs, they would earn €10.- for the pot. They could approach and ask the locals to borrow rugs for the assignment. The maximum they could earn for the assignment was €2,500.-.

The group managed to cover 2 streets, with a final measurement of 44,5m, thus €445 was added to the pot.

Heftig (Fierce)

Arriving in Durrës Harbor, the candidates were divided into pairs: One pair who were not afraid of heights and could compose questions; and one pair who would remain on the ground to provide answers. With a time limit of 45 minutes, the first pair would try to read out a list of fast rotating questions off laptops from a crane above the harbor. The pair on the ground had access to 18 containers with names of the season's candidates attached, and to a forklift. At the end of the assignment, if the group managed to move all but one container off the playing field in the harbor, inside they could find €1,500.-.

The 17 questions related to the assignments that have played out throughout the season, and would be split apart into two sentences, leaving the Crane pair to figure out what are the real compositions of the questions. While the ground pair would instruct Forklift drivers to move the containers. At the end of the assignment, if there was more than one container left, the Ground pair would be given a choice by Rik. The Ground pair could pick the correct container themselves, or they could consult one more time with the Crane pair before making a selection, at the cost of halving their potential winnings for this assignment.

The Ground Pair chose not to consult with the Crane pair, and picked a wrong Container; thus nothing was earned for the pot.

Zand Erover (Sand It Over)

Before returning to Tirana, Rik gathered the candidates for a late afternoon assignment at the beach in Durrës. The candidates were instructed to meet Rik for drinks at a beach bar in half an hour, arriving on scooters. The catch was that the scooters were disassembled and buried under the beach they were standing on. For every candidate that arrives on time on a scooter, €500.- would be added to the pot. If a candidate arrived without a scooter, nothing would be added to the pot; and lastly, for every candidate that arrived late, €500.- would be removed from the pot.

The candidates managed to assemble one scooter and arrive before the time limit was up; thus €500.- was earned for the pot.

=== Episode 9 - Bedriegen ===
Episode 9 - Bedriegen
Original airdates: 26 February 2022 Locations: Tirana, Tirana County
Assignment	Money earned	Possible earnings
Alarmerend	€970.-	€2,000.-
Afrekenen	€325.-	€2,000.-
Binnenskamers	-€1,000.-	€2,000.-
Current Pot	€13,335.-	€64,540.-

Alarmerend (Alarming)

In the former residence of Enver Hoxha, Albania's former Head of State during the 20th Century, the Finalists were tasked to raid the house in search of money for the pot. Hidden throughout the first floor of the building were keys that could unlock safes, and paper money for the Finalists to find. Along with alarms and laser beams that the Finalists must avoid tripping. One at a time, the Finalists must explore the first floor, with assistance from the other two Finalists from a separate control room full of photographs and maps detailing the alarms and hiding positions of keys, safes, and money. Once inside the house, each Finalist would have three lives, losing one for every time they trip an alarm. After they have lost their first life, a Security Guard enters the floor to seek the Finalist. If a Finalist loses all their lives, or is found by the Security Guard, all money in their possession is removed from the assignment. Each Finalist has 15 minutes to explore the first floor for up to €2,000.- to the group pot.

The group recovered €970 from the house for the group pot.

Afrekenen (Checkout)

Arriving late at night to a shopping Expo in the midst of Tirana, the Finalists were given a grocery list by Rik to complete in darkness. Using only their shopping cart as protection, each Finalist must traverse through a Grocery Store set to retrieve items from Rik's list and check them out at the front of the store. All while dodging laser gun armed guards throughout the aisles. The Finalists each were given 15 minutes to check out as many items on the list as possible to earn up to €2,000.-. And if a Finalist is shot by a guard, their round is over. However, all items they collected in their shopping cart are left in the storefront for the other Finalists to checkout themselves. The active Finalist could communicate with the others stationed outside the Storefront looking in.

The Finalists managed to checkout enough items to earn €325 for the group pot.

Binnenskamers (Indoor Rooms)

The Finalists were taken to the House of Leaves in Tirana for the last assignment of the season. Using the now Museum as a base of operations, the Finalists had 45 minutes to find a spy somewhere in the city with an envelope holding €2,000.-. Inside the Museum were three tasks which would help the finalists pinpoint who out of 5 potential suspects held the money. The first task persisted of deciphering letters to learn about different espionage terminology for spies and their roles, the second task involved observing CCTV footage of the 5 suspects to determine their roles as spies, and lastly cross-examining photographs in the Darkroom exhibit to assign photographs with the 5 suspects to retrieve a secret message on the back of the photographs. Once the Finalists have selected their prime suspect, they must leave the museum to the address belonging to their suspect to receive an envelope with money. If the Finalists are wrong, they could potentially lose money from the pot.

The Finalists arrived at the address for the Bridge Agent suspect, where upon opening the envelope discovered they were incorrect and received minus money in the envelope; thus €1,000.- was removed for the final pot.

=== Episode 10 - De Ontmaskering ===
Episode 10 - De Ontmaskering
Original airdates: 5 March 2022 Locations: Amsterdam, Netherlands
Assignment	Money earned	Possible earnings
Ontmaskerd?	€5,000.-	€5,000.-
Pot Count	€270.-	N/A
Final Pot	€8,065.-	€64,540.-
Losing Finalists
Kim-Lian van der Meij
Winner
Fresia Cousiño Arias
The Mole
Everon Jackson Hooi

Throughout the Season's Execution Ceremonies, the Executed Candidates were given an invitation from the Mole by Rik before leaving the game; inviting them to a Masked Ball at the Royal Palace in Albania for the Mole's Unmasking. After a catch up with the 8 Executed Candidates at the Live Reveal, Rik revealed what had happened in the Masked Ball back in Albania in September 2021. After the Executed Candidates were revealed at the Masked Ball, Everon unmasked himself at the Reunion as the Mole of 2022.

After the reveal of the Mole's identity, €5,000.- was removed from the pot due to Glen giving Everon an Exemption after the results of the Livestream assignment, Ontmaskerd?. Rik revealed that Kim-Lian had suspected Everon from the very beginning, while Fresia had narrowly avoided execution, performing the second worst next to Glen in Episode 2 before she focused on Everon from Episode 3 onwards. Further sabotages by Everon, as the Candidate who was the last Treasurer for the group, saw another €270.- was removed from the pot under his watch. After examining some of Everon's sabotage, leaving a new record lowest Winner's pot of €8,065.-; Rik revealed that both Fresia and Kim-Lian had tied on the final test with a score of 34 out of 40 each, before announcing with a faster test time by 50 seconds, that Fresia Cousiño Arias had become the Winner of Wie is de Mol 2022.

== Mole Sabotage ==
Everon as the Mole had one goal in mind; to have the lowest pot ever in the history of the game. Knowing in advance all the assignments, and the "Ontmaskerd?" livestream gave him the perfect opportunity to secretly begin the season with a bang while winning his fellow Candidates' hearts.

Ontmaskerd?: Even though Everon knew how to sabotage the two previous assignments in Episode 1, he chose to play the assignments as a genuine candidate, and utilize the time they had overnight to bond with his fellow candidates. Knowing that it was impossible for anyone to actively win the audience vote as the least suspected candidate, Everon sought to be the Exemption winner's choice for the second Exemption. To his fortune, Glen without hesistating gave Everon the second Exemption, unknowingly removing €5,000.- from the pot in the Finale.

Binnen en Buiten Bereik: Throughout his turn in the assignment, he would flip dice away from showing 1; he cheated by using his hands in separating green and red marbles instead of using chopsticks as instructed; and lastly, as the Ping Pong balls consisted of the most money to be earned in the assignment, he would seek the balls with the highest money value so that he could throw them out of contention in the assignment.

Waar Rook Is, Is Vuur: While the Candidates were instructed that their thumbprints could open only 1 box hidden throughout the laser game assignment, Everon's could open all the boxes. While running the assignment with Kim-Lian and Fresia, Everon secretly extracted money from seven boxes before getting shot to remove the money from the rest of the group's hands. (Side note: It was revealed that Sahil had been the person who shot Arno out of the assignment, unbeknownst to the two of them, while handing back the same €50 note to safety.)

Vakbondjes: Knowing that he also had to appear as a genuine candidate, Everon chose to use this assignment to play up his disappointment with Thomas choosing Jokers for himself instead of an Exemption for the both of them. His performance had rattled Thomas that they had to make amends after surviving the third Execution together. However, this was the assignment that had put Everon on both Thomas and Fresia's radar due to his emotional response. Everon's intentions were to take the three Jokers for himself, but Thomas beat him to it.

Uit de Lucht Gegrepen: The bag that Fresia had thrown to Everon from the glider had landed a lot closer to him than appeared. He managed to both reach the bag, and find his key with ease. But chose to pretend he could not reach while in the sight of the gliders, and buried his key again. If he was unable to free himself, it meant Hila could not get any information from him and earn money for the assignment.

Zwanenmeer: Teamed up with Laetitia, Everon would tell her to attach Swans to their Hydrobike with incorrect statements. And at one point while Laetitia was in the water, he fiddled with the walkie-talkie radio they were using so that the rest of the group could not communicate with them easily for the remainder of the assignment.

In Het Verschiet: During his preparations for the Season, Everon prepared for both parts of the assignment. However, as he was chosen to enter the Castle, he chose to try and hide as many keys as possible to cut down on the amount of money the second group could earn on their part of the assignment. He decided to find one key in front of Laetitia and Fresia to misdirect he had thrown out another. The key he had thrown out made sure €1,050.- was removed midway through the assignment. He had intended to poorly shoot any arrows he had, but Laetitia and Fresia's excellent performance would have made his shots look suspicious.

De Boot Missen?: While not a sabotage itself, Everon rode in a boat accompanying the fellow Candidates during the assignment. After almost getting spotted by Laetitia and Fresia, he became more bold with other candidates, waving and calling for their attention.

Carpet Diem: The night before the assignment, Everon went out to a local pub in Gjirokastër to chat with locals about the carpets the group would need to borrow. Learning how to speak some Albanian phrases, during the assignment, he would ask for small carpets, and overlap them instead of spreading them out. Making sure the group covered as few meters of the streets as possible.

Heftig: With the knowledge of which container the money was hidden in for the assignment, Everon had instructed the forklift operator to remove the correct container while the others were distracted with each other. And then let Thomas pick the final container to put the blame on him when they found nothing inside.

Zand Erover: While the Candidates were giving their Confessionals after the Heftig assignment, Everon was tasked to hide the scooter parts for this assignment in the beach near by. Telling the locals and tourists to not move or listen to the other candidates while they searched with the metal detectors. While using the metal detector, he would lead the others to spots where he knew no parts were hidden by him. With how difficult he made the assignment, the candidates could only find one out of the four scooters in time.

Binnenskamers: During the assignment, Everon managed to get the suspect photographs to drop to the floor, making sure important photographs went missing for the assignment. This was difficult as he was aware that both Fresia and Kim-Lian were watching his movements thoroughly on the last assignment.

Treasurer and Kim-Lian's Theft: When Hila was executed from the game, she entrusted Everon with the role of the Group's new Treasurer. He immediately approached Kim-Lian about the missing €250 in her possession, as a means to make himself appear like a genuine Candidate. However, it turned out, that Kim-Lian had stolen another €20 from the pot in the Alarmerend assignment. Under the guise of not telling Fresia about Kim-Lian's thefts, Everon decided to flush the stolen money down the toilet in a hotel bathroom to get rid of the evidence.

The Missing €100: It turns out, that some of the coins the candidates had collected as money for the pot had gone missing in the Candidates' bus around the time after Hila's execution, and never returned to the pot. Thus the €100.- discrepancy between Episode 5 and 6.

Further Sabotages: During his round in the Alarmerend assignment, Everon actually consumed some of the money he found hidden throughout the assignment instead of bringing as much as he could in. While in Testafette, he cheated with the slingshot task to get ahead of the fanatical candidates he was competing against.

== Hidden Clues ==
Masked Money In connect to the Masked Ball theme of the season, all the Minus Money the Candidates could earn had Everon's eyes hidden behind the masks. While all the Positive Money throughout the season had everyone else's eyes behind the masks.

Episode 1 - (Af)Troeven: In the beginning of the episode, Rik would inform the Candidates on which team they would take part in the first assignment. The only Candidate who did not receive such instructions was Everon; as he already knew because he assigned the teams. Another hint in the first assignment was the large scale matchstick puzzle: 3 - 0 = 5; highlighting Everon's Birthday, the 30th of May. Lastly, Rik mentioned at the end of the assignment that the money had a hint on it. Troeven could be found on the €100 note, where removing the 't', you could unscramble Everon's name from it.

Everon's Vest: The green vest that Everon wore often throughout the season had 'Bird 33' written on the back. A lot of hints throughout the season related to multiples of 11. A total of 11 players, the 22nd season; 11 + 22 = 33. While the Albanian Flag has a crest with a two headed bird in the center, similar to the two face nature of playing the Mole.

Episode 5 - Kettingsreactie: The Title for this Episode relates to the cause and effect of Everon's sabotage in Uit de Lucht Gegrepen. As Everon chose not to free himself in the assignment, he prevented Hila from receiving information that could help her find money for the pot. The start of a Chain Reaction, a Kettingsreactie.

Episode 8 - Mollenvanger: Inside the Episode's title was Everon's name. The Mole everyone is trying to catch.

Reddingsactie: At the debriefing of the Reddingsactie assignment, Rik himself gave a hint to the Candidates and the audience, "... en misschien wel belangrijker is dat jullie weer een nieuwe informatie hebben over de Mol in de midden..." ("... and perhaps more importantly, you have some new information about the Mole in the middle..") Everon was situated in the middle of the assignment on the dinghy with the map and information.

Carpet Diem: The carpet in which Rik stands on at the briefing for the assignment, had symbols showing the initials of Everon's name along its border. E and H, Everon Hooi.

== Reception ==
=== Viewing figures ===
Viewing Figures
#	Title	Air Date	Time Slot	Average	Total
1	De Tijd zal het Leren	January 1, 2022	Saturday 20.30 CET	3,120,000	3,892,000
2	Zwijgen	January 8, 2022	Saturday 20.30 CET	3,996,000	4,706,000
3	Nietszeggend	January 15, 2022	Saturday 20.30 CET	3,084,000	3,647,000
4	Stemmen	January 22, 2022	Saturday 20.30 CET	2,905,000	3,742,000
5	Kettingreactie	January 29, 2022	Saturday 20.30 CET	2,934,000	3,680,000
6	Golfbeweging	February 5, 2022	Saturday 20.30 CET	2,836,000	3,415,000
7	Coulissen	February 12, 2022	Saturday 20.30 CET	2,713,000	3,566,000
8	Mollenvanger	February 19, 2022	Saturday 20.30 CET	2,646,000	3,372,000
9	Bedriegen	February 26, 2022	Saturday 20.30 CET	2,546,000	3,301,000
10	De Ontmaskering	March 5, 2022	Saturday 20.30 CET	3,242,000	4,101,000
