= Wie is de Mol? (Dutch TV series) season 21 =

Dutch reality television season

Wie is de Mol?
- Season 21
- Presented by: Rik van de Westelaken
- No. of contestants: 10
- Winner: Roxanne Hehakaija
- Runner-up: Charlotte Nijs
- Location: Czechia
- The Mole: Renée Fokker
- No. of episodes: 10

Release
- Original network: AVROTROS (NPO 1)
- Original release: 2 January – 6 March 2021

Season chronology
- ← Previous; 20th Anniversary season: Italy Next → Season 22: Albania

The twenty-first season of the Dutch TV series Wie is de Mol? ("Who is the Mole?") aired on 2 January 2021. This was the fourth season with Rik van de Westelaken as host. The location of the season was Czechia. The candidates and the location were announced on 21 December 2020 in a special television episode of the aftershow Moltalk.

The season premiered on 2 January 2021. With the socially distanced Live Reunion on 6 March 2021, which saw Rocky Hehakaija win based on time against fellow finalist, Charlotte Nijs, to successfully unmask actress Renée Fokker as the Mole of 2021. Fokker's reign as the Mole saw Hehakaija win the new all-time lowest pot of €9,675, surpassing the record set by the Season 19 Mole of €10,150.

== Format ==
Followed the same format as its Belgian predecessor, ten candidates were gathered to complete Assignments to earn money for the group pot. However, one of the ten is the titular Mole (de Mol), the one designated to sabotage the assignments and cause the group to earn the least amount of money for the winner's pot as possible. Every few days, players would take a 20-question multiple choice test about the identity of the Mole. Once the test is complete, the candidates await their results in an Execution ceremony. The candidate with the worst score is executed from the game, while in the event of a tie the candidate who completed their test the slowest is executed. The season plays out until there are three remaining candidates, where they must complete a final test (consisting of 40 questions). The candidate with the highest score, or who had completed their test the fastest in a tie, is declared the winner and receives the group's pot.

== Candidates ==
Name	Occupation	Day Exited	Result
Renée Fokker	Actress	18	The Mole
Rocky Hehakaija	Footballer	18	Winner
Charlotte Nijs	Journalist	18	2nd place
Splinter Chabot	Author	16	3rd place
Marije Knevel	Social media expert and deputy editor	14	4th place
Joshua Nolet	Lead Singer of Dutch indie pop band Chef'Special	10	5th place
Lakshmi Swami Persaud	Singer	8	6th place
Florentijn Hofman	Artist	6	7th place
Erik de Zwart	Radio DJ and television presenter	4	8th place
Remco Veldhuis	Comedian and singer	2	9th place
the result in grey indicates the Mole

== Candidate progress ==
The order in which the candidates learned their results are indicated in the table below.

Summary of candidates' progress in each episode
Candidate	1	2	3	4	5 (Note: Charlotte, Marije and Rocky purchased information about an upcoming assignment which they used to their advantage to complete the assignment successfully. As a result, each of them won an exemption and they automatically advanced to the next episode.)	6 (Note: Renée won the third assignment in the episode and, as her prize, she did not have to see her screen. She also chose Marije and Charlotte to advance to the next episode without having to see their screen.)	7	8	Finale (Note: Unlike other 'Finale' episodes in earlier seasons of the show, the runner-up of this season did see a red screen and was executed from the game.)
Rocky		3rd		1st	exempt	1st	2nd		Winner
Renée		1st			1st	exempt	4th	2nd	The Mole
Charlotte	2nd		1st	3rd	exempt	exempt	1st	1st	Runner-Up
Splinter	1st			2nd		2nd	3rd	Executed	
Marije			2nd		exempt	exempt	Executed		
Joshua		2nd			Executed				
Lakshmi	3rd			Executed					
Florentijn			Executed (Note: Florentijn used Jokers on this test, however, he was still executed from the game.)						
Erik		Executed							
Remco	Executed								

The candidate saw a Green Screen to proceed to the next episode.
The candidate used Jokers for this test, and saw a Green Screen to proceed to the next episode.
The candidate used Jokers for this test, however, they did not see a Green Screen before the executed player saw their Red Screen. Thus they proceeded to the next episode.
The candidate did not see a Green Screen before the executed player saw their Red Screen. Thus they proceeded to the next episode.
The candidate received an exemption to automatically proceed to the next episode.
The candidate was executed from the game and sent home.

== Episodes ==
For more information, see: List of seasons of "Wie is de Mol?" (in Dutch)

Episode	Air Date	Title	Amount in Pot (Note: Pot earnings: indicates an increase indicates no change indicates a decrease)	Location	Days	Eliminated
1	January 2, 2021	"Gelijk" ('Equal')	€0 → €1,350	Jaroslavice, South Moravian → Mikulov, South Moravian	1–2	Remco
2	January 9, 2021	"Voorbeeld" ('Example')	€1,350 → €3,150	Valtice, South Moravian → Znojmo, South Moravian → Kopřivnice, South Moravian	3–4	Erik
3	January 16, 2021	"Vanaf hangen" ('It Depends')	€3,150 → €6,150	Brno, South Moravian → Zlín, Zlín	5–6	Florentijn
4	January 23, 2021	"Voor het zeggen" ('For Saying')	€6,150 → €10,495	Zlín, Zlín → Brno, South Moravian → Dobřichovice, Central Bohemian	7–8	Lakshmi
5	January 30, 2021	"Tot drie tellen" ('Count To Three')	€10,495 → €6,245	Central Bohemian Region, Bohemia → Hradec Králové, Hradec Králové → Lužná, Bohemia	8–10	Joshua
6	February 6, 2021	"Wegstoppen" ('Put Away')	€6,245 → €7,645	Kutná Hora, Central Bohemian → Mladá Boleslav, Central Bohemian → Vinařice, Central Bohemian	11–12	N/A (Note: Renée won an Exemption in this episode, which allowed her to select two other candidates to skip their test results and join her in the next episode. She chose Charlotte, and Marije. As Rocky and Splinter both received green screens from their test, no one was executed from the game, and continued as the final 5.)
7	February 13, 2021	"Aanwijzing" ('Pointer')	€7,645 → €8,975	Vinařice, Central Bohemian → Kladno, Central Bohemian → Kuks, Hradec Králové	13–14	Marije
8	February 20, 2021	"In één klap" ('In One Fell Swoop')	€8,975 → €7,875	Toužim, Karlovy Vary → Mariánské Lázně, Karlovy Vary	15–16	Splinter
9	February 27, 2021	"Kaarsrecht" ('Upright')	€7,875 → €8,925	Loket, Karlovy Vary → Nevřeň, Plzeň → Mariánské Lázně, Karlovy Vary	17–18	Charlotte
Finale	March 6, 2021	"De ontknoping" ('The Unmasking')	€8,925 → €9,675	Amsterdam, the Netherlands	Winner	Rocky
Finale	March 6, 2021	"De ontknoping" ('The Unmasking')	€8,925 → €9,675	Amsterdam, the Netherlands	The Mole	Renée

== Season summary ==
=== Episode 1 – Gelijk ===
Episode 1 – "Gelijk"
Original airdates: 2 January 2021 Locations: Jaroslavice, South Moravian - Mikulov, South Moravian
Assignment	Money earned	Possible earnings
Door een deur	€0	€2,500
Vriend of vijand	€450	€1,500
Moltainbiken	€900	€1,000 (Note: The maximum amount of the "Moltainbiken" assignment was listed as €1,000 on the show's graphics after the group declined the option of making the assignment worth €2,000 (if they answer all the questions correctly) or nothing if they answer any questions incorrectly.)
Current Pot	€1,350	€5,000
Jokers
Marije, Renée and Rocky	Door een deur	
Execution
Remco	1st player executed	

Door een deur

Each candidate begins in a room with an envelope and photos of the other candidates and how they would behave as the Mole. The envelope instructs them to find €250 hidden in the room. When they find the money, the Mole slides them an envelope under the door with an offer. They can either keep the €250 they found, or slide the money under the door in exchange for een joker ("one joker"). Unbeknownst to candidates, the Joker they receive after returning the money is in the form of a valueless Joker card.

When the group met for the first time, Rik revealed seven contestants took the Mole’s offer, forfeiting the money found. Rik then gave the three candidates who kept their €250 the same offer, however this time in exchange for a real Joker. All three candidates accepted the offer.

No money was earned for the pot.

Vriend of vijand

Candidates participate in a Laser game to earn money spread across the courtyard within the Monastery of Jaroslavice, however, there are opponents that can eliminate candidates and vice versa. Any candidate who is hit is out of the game and lose everything they find during the assignment. There is a 30-minute time limit. To win money, candidates must open chests marked with a letter; elsewhere in the field is a sign with the letter and the combination to open the lock and get the money inside. Mid-way through the game, Rik announces that candidates may shoot each other, the last candidate remaining wins an exemption. The group decided not to shoot each other, dismissing the exemption.

€450 was earned for the pot.

Moltainbiken

The group is separated into five duos; each duo must complete part of a moletainbike trip. As the first duo rides, they must remember facts about other candidates written on signs along the track. At the transfer point, they verbally transfer the information to the second duo who rides the next part of the trip, is given more information to remember, and transfers the information to the third duo. The process continues until the fifth duo reach the end of the course and must answer ten yes/no questions based on the information they are provided. Each correct answer earns €100 for the pot and there is a one-hour time limit for the assignment.

€900 was earned for the pot.

=== Episode 2 – Voorbeeld ===
Episode 2 – "Voorbeeld"
Original airdates: 9 January 2021 Locations: Valtice, South Moravian → Znojmo, South Moravian → Kopřivnice, South Moravian
Assignment	Money earned	Possible earnings
Om de tuin leiden	€700	€3,000
De dans ontspringen?	€400	€2,000
Symbolisch bedrag	€700	€2,100
Current Pot	€3,150	€12,100
Execution
Erik	2nd player executed	

'Om de tuin leiden'

The candidates are divided into two groups and are given a tour of either the interior or the garden of Valtice Castle. The group must document information during the tour: through writing, photography and filming. Before the assignment begins, each group chooses a coordinator, who enters a control room to tell their respective groups what to look for. However, when the coordinators arrive in the control room, they are given a secret mission. They must get the writers and photographers in their group to complete secret assignments worth €100 each (communicating to them via earpiece), without the knowledge of the person filming. At the end of the assignment, if the person filming can name two assignments, they earn a Joker and forfeit any money earned by their group.

€900 was earned for the pot.

De dans ontspringen?

Candidates are divided into two groups, explorers and gatherers. The explorers enter Louka Monastery first and take notes on the location of money inside for the gatherers to later collect, communicating via walkie-talkie. Inside the buildings are "Black-light Ballerinas", blindfolded ballerinas who can eliminate candidates by shooting them with a laser gun. Candidates who are shot lose everything they collected, including any hidden Jokers found inside the monastery. In front of each ballerina are three ballerina boxes, two of which play music when opened and the third contains money. The explorers have 20 minutes, and to help, hints are written on the wall of the monastery.

€400 was earned for the pot.

Symbolisch bedrag

Candidates arrive at a Tatra truck centre and divide themselves into four duos and one individual, who acts as a ‘communicator’. Two duos must ride a truck as it drives down a bumpy track, and photograph the marked correct signs with symbols on them. They send their photos to the communicator who describes the sign to one of the remaining two duos, who then drive a truck and knock over a corresponding sign at the testing centre. Each correct sign knocked over earns €350 for the pot.

€700 was earned for the pot.

=== Episode 3 – Vanaf hangen ===
Episode 3 – "Vanaf hangen"
Original airdates: 16 January 2021 Locations: Brno, South Moravian Region - Zlín, Zlín Region
Assignment	Money earned	Possible earnings
Kameraad	€1,000	€2,000
Binnenvaart	N/A	N/A
De rode draad	€2,000	€2,000
Current Pot	€6,150	€16,100
Jokers
Charlotte and Renée	Kameraad	
Charlotte, Florentijn, Marije and Rocky	De rode draad	
Execution
Florentijn	3rd player executed	

Kameraad

Candidates are divided into four duos and locked in a hotel room. Each candidate is given a confidential document with their answers to the previous test. To escape their hotel room, they must enter the correct code word to unlock the door. To receive clues to the code word eenentwintig ('twenty-one'), the contestants are asked questions about their answers on the previous test. If both candidates in the duo answer truthfully, they receive a hint to the code word. However, each candidate’s answers are visible to the whole group. There are five questions and after each question, teams who receive a hint can attempt to enter the codeword. For each duo that escapes their room, €500 is added to the pot, and the first duo to escape also earns two Jokers each.

€1,000 was earned for the pot.

Binnenvaart

Candidates divide themselves into duos; one candidate in the duo kayaks and the other without a fear of heights. The four candidates who want to kayak enters a kayak and paddles through the Punkva Caves to find projections. The projections show money and Jokers, with each item having a corresponding Czech word that they memorise to later communicate the information to their partner.

De rode draad

The four candidates who did not participate in the previous assignment are taken to the top of Baťa's Skyscraper, and must abseil down. Along the way, there are five tubes with various contents inside labelled with Czech words corresponding to the words seen by their partner in the cave. As they abseil, they can communicate to their partner and must collect two tubes, one for them and one for their partner. Prior to the abseil, Rik gives the four who abseil an offer; if all four candidates go for the money, then all four win an exemption and forfeit the money. The exemptions were ultimately not awarded.

€2,000 was earned for the pot.

=== Episode 4 – Voor het zeggen ===
Episode 4 – "Voor het zeggen"
Original airdates: 23 January 2021 Locations: Zlín, Zlín Region - Brno, South Moravian - Central Bohemian Region, Bohemia
Assignment	Money earned	Possible earnings
Meeliften	€1,145	€2,250
Fotogenie(k)	€1,200	€1,400
In vuur en vlam	€2,000	€2,000
Current Pot	€10,495	€21,650
Execution
Lakshmi	4th player executed	

Meeliften

Three candidates begin on different floors of the former Baťa's Shoe Factory (now Baťa's Skyscraper), where they must ask questions and record the answers given by the remaining candidates. The remaining four candidates ride a paternoster lift and answer as the lift passes the floor, the time-limit is 20 minutes. The questions require the candidates in the lift to state a required number of possible answers for a category, beginning with a specific letter. For example, 'three clothing items beginning with j'. Each answer is worth €5 and if all required answers for a category are given, €50 is earned for the question.

€1,145 was earned for the pot.

Fotogenie(k)

Five candidates are assigned to individually explore Brno and take seven black-and-white photographs in landscape mode, one representing each candidate. There is a 30-minute time-limit for this part of the assignment. The photos may not contain any people, names or references to candidate’s jobs. The photos are then compiled into an exhibit, where the remaining two candidates must guess which candidate each collection of photos belong to. For each correct guess, €200 is earned for the pot. The two candidates are given one free photo to begin with from each candidate's album and each additional photo flipped over reduces the total by €50, while incorrect guesses lose €250.

€1,200 was earned for the pot.

In vuur en vlam

Candidates swim through a lake in Velká Amerika towards a large raft to collect keys from underneath the raft. The keys unlock the ropes attached to the raft to be untangled, as well as a smaller raft. They must light a torch and transfer the burning torch to the larger raft, to ignite a second torch attached to the raft. They must then pull the ropes to steer the raft and burn hanging ropes to release tubes, which are to be collected and returned to shore to be counted. Each tube either adds or loses money for the pot, underneath the larger raft is a map detailing the position and contents of each tube. There is a 45-minute time limit for the assignment.

€2,000 was earned for the pot.

=== Episode 5 – Tot drie tellen ===
Episode 5 – "Tot drie tellen"
Original airdates: 30 January 2021 Locations: Central Bohemian Region, Bohemia - Hradec Králové, Hradec Králové Region - Lužná, Bohemia
Assignment	Money earned	Possible earnings
Wie, wat... waar?	€0	€1,800
Zekerheid bieden	-€5,000	N/A
Ontspoord?	€850	€1,800
Current Pot	€6,245	€25,250
Exemptions
Charlotte, Marije and Rocky	Ontspoord?	
Execution
Joshua	5th player executed	

Wie, wat... waar?

The group is divided into three duos, each duo starts at a viewing point at Bohemian Paradise. Two duos begin cards listing a person and action (wie & wat) while one duo has location (waar) cards. The duos with the person and action cards must paint the person and action listed, to be viewed from afar by the duo with the location card. The duo with the location card must recreate the painting and add the listed place to the painting, before showing the final duo who must guess the person, action and location. The two groups with the person and action cards alternate between painting and guessing, and each guess is to be written next to an amount of money that they win if the sentence is correct.

No money was earned for the pot.

Zekerheid bieden

Each candidate individually meets with Rik at the East Bohemian Museum and can place a bid (with money from the pot) to receive information about the upcoming assignment, where three exemptions can be won. The candidate who places the highest bid is given access to the information and can select two other candidates to join them to form a team, while the remaining three candidates form the opposing team. Charlotte, Marije and Rocky all bid €5,000 for the information meaning that, rather than letting the highest bidder pick two others, they automatically form the team that receives the information for the next assignment.

€5,000 was removed from the pot.

Ontspoord?

Before the assignment begins, each candidate sits the execution test.

One team enters the front wagon of a train and the other team enters the back. They must complete tasks in each wagon to advance to the next carriage as the train travels to the execution ceremony. In the first wagon, teams must find the total price of four tickets that make a train connection between Molsberg and Prague. In the second carriage, teams must identify seven (out of 15) incorrect clocks and solve the riddles attached to them using the information in the wagon. In the third wagon, teams must collect postbags at the two stations as the train passes, and enter the code found inside to unlock the door and reach the centre wagon. Additionally, there is a money clock which begins at €1,800 and depreciates as they complete their tasks. Once a team reaches the center carriage, the clock stops and the money is earned, while the team also wins three exemptions – if the assignment is completed in under 30 minutes.

€850 was earned for the pot. Immediately after the train stops, the execution commences, where the candidate with the lowest score from the remaining three candidates is eliminated.

=== Episode 6 – Wegstoppen ===
Episode 6 – "Wegstoppen"
Original airdates: 6 February 2021 Locations: Kutná Hora, Central Bohemian Region - Mladá Boleslav, Central Bohemian Region - Vinařice, Central Bohemian Region
Assignment	Money earned	Possible earnings
Brieven-bus	€650	€1,750
Ontspannen	€0	€1,500
Onder druk zetten	€750	€2,000
Current Pot	€7,645	€30,500
Jokers
Charlotte, Rocky and Splinter	Brieven-bus	
Execution
No one executed

Brieven-bus

The group begins on a bus as it drives down a road with nine stops. At each stop, only one candidate may get off the bus and view the sign behind the stop. The sign either contains a dilemma, information about the stops, or instructs the candidate to remain at the stop for the remainder of the assignment. There are also opportunities to earn advantages and money throughout the assignment at certain bus stops. For each candidate still on the bus after all nine stops, €250 is added to the pot.

€650 was earned for the pot.

Ontspannen

Each candidate begins locked in a cell within Prison Mladá Boleslav. Each cell is located in one of three sections; two sections contain two candidates and the third section contains one candidate. Similar to an escape room, they must first escape their individual cell using provided items. They must then cooperate to obtain keys to unlock the gates to escape their section and ultimately the prison. During the assignment, they can find up to €1,500 around the facility, however, this money is only added to the pot if all five candidates escape the prison within the time limit.

No money was earned for the pot.

Onder druk zetten

Candidates begin in different starting positions within Mayrau Open Air Museum, with a unique five-digit code attached to their body. Around the area are eight stations; each station presents candidates with a choice: remove one life from another candidate of their choice, or add €250 to the pot. Candidates are eliminated if they lose three lives, or have their code seen and entered into a tablet by another candidate. The last candidate remaining will not see their screen at the next execution, and selects two other candidates to also not see their screen, if over €500 is earned.

€750 was earned for the pot. Renée was the last candidate remaining and earned the ability to select two additional candidates not to see their screen at the execution.

=== Episode 7 – Aanwijzing ===
Episode 7 – "Aanwijzing"
Original airdates: 13 February 2021 Locations: Vinařice, Central Bohemian Region - Kladno, Central Bohemian Region - Kuks, Hradec Králové Region
Assignment	Money earned	Possible earnings
Steen goed	€380	€1,750
Zinvol	€300	€1,500
Aanwijzingen	€800	€2,000
Current Pot	€8,975	€35,750
Execution
Marije	6th player executed	

Steen goed

Three candidates enter the mine of Mayrau Open Air Museum and break stones to obtain placards, revealing number codes, which they must communicate to the remaining two candidates via a walkie-talkie. The remaining two candidates are given access to both the locker room and a large hall full of low-hanging garments. Using the codes given, they must find the code on a corresponding locker, which contains a garment inside. Once found, they must enter the hall and hoist all the identical garments to the ones they find in the lockers. There is a 45-minute time limit for the assignment. For each correct garment left hanging low, €25 is added to the pot, however, for each incorrect garment not hoisted, €10 is lost.

€380 was earned for the pot.

Zinvol

Candidates must search around an empty industrial estate, where there are 50 chests scattered around the area. They must load chests into a Jeep and transport them to a designated area to form five Dutch sentences using the words printed on them. Candidates do not need to collect all 50 chests, however, they must use each chest they collect. For each sentence, there are also two pre-assigned chests which must be used in the sentence, and each sentence can have a maximum of 12 words. Sentences do not need to be factual, however they must be grammatically correct. There is a 30-minute time limit for the assignment. For each satisfactory sentence formed, €300 is added to the pot.

€300 was earned for the pot.

Aanwijzingen

Three players begin wearing wireless headphones which play a song. They are separated from each other with dividers and must communicate the song to the remaining two candidates, using only movements. Any mouthing of lyrics or humming is not allowed. The remaining two candidates must guess the name of the song within one minute. After five songs, players rotate positions and the process continues until all 20 songs have been played. For each correct guess, €100 is added to the pot.

€800 was earned for the pot.

=== Episode 8 – In één klap ===
Episode 8 – "In één klap"
Original airdates: 20 February 2021 Locations: Toužim, Karlovy Vary Region - Mariánské Lázně, Karlovy Vary Region
Assignment	Money earned	Possible earnings
Voor joker staan	€0	€1,500
Rij gedrag	€900	€1,500
Ra(a)dgeving	-€2,000	€8,000
Current Pot	€7,875	€46,750
Jokers
Charlotte and Renée	Ra(a)dgeving	
Execution
Splinter	7th player executed	

Voor joker staan

Contestants are brought to Aeroklub Toužim and are asked to select two candidates to enter a glider plane while the remaining two candidates remain on the ground. One candidate on the ground must communicate three instructions to the candidate on the plane via walkie talkie. While the stunt plane flies, the candidate inside must relay the instructions to the second candidate on the ground, who must follow the instructions – which involve swapping the places of covered puzzle pieces to correctly assemble a puzzle. The two candidates on the ground swap positions once the second candidate enters the plane and the process repeats. If the puzzle is solved by the end of the assignment, €1500 is added to the pot.

No money was earned for the pot.

Rij gedrag

Contestants enter the Municipal Theatre of Mariánské Lázně (Mariënbad Theater) to find the seats occupied with portraits of former Wie is de Mol candidates. However, some of the portraits are not in the correct row and must be moved. Upon entry, a series of music videos begins playing in which contestants must decipher clues from the music to correctly determine which portraits belong in each row - the row each song correlates to is mentioned beforehand. For example, the song "You Can Leave Your Hat On" requires row 10 to contain portraits of candidates wearing a hat. For each row with correct portraits, €300 is added to the pot.

€900 was earned for the pot.

Ra(a)dgeving

Candidates are presented with a wheel which contains prizes or penalties that can be won. One candidate must spin the wheel and another candidate must provide advice on whether or not to take the prize or penalty. The candidate spinning the wheel is not able to see what is shown on the wheel and must rely on the provided advice. The candidate spinning the wheel can accept or reject the prize or penalty that they think they have won. If they reject, they must spin the wheel again. The candidate can reject the advice up to two times and, in that case, they must take whatever they get when they spin the wheel for the third time.

€2,000 was removed from the pot.

=== Episode 9 – Kaarsrecht ===
Episode 9 – "Kaarsrecht"
Original airdates: 27 February 2021 Locations: Loket, Karlovy Vary Region - Nevřeň, Plzeň Region - Mariánské Lázně, Karlovy Vary Region
Assignment	Money earned	Possible earnings
Intrappen	€1,050	€1,750
Lumineus Idee (Note: The result of the assignment was withheld until the finale, following the reveal of the Mole.)	€750	€1,000
Final Pot	€9,675	€49,500
Execution
Charlotte	Runner Up	

Intrappen

The group begins at the start of a six-kilometre trail and must reach the end of the course (Svatoš rocks) in 45 minutes to earn initially €100 for the pot. Along the trail are stations where additional money can be earned by completing an obstacle, or returning along the route to enter a code into a locked box. Candidates are given a kick scooter to begin with, and along the way there are three dilemmas they would encounter.

At the first dilemma, candidates could trade in their scooters and continue on foot to earn €50 each. At the second dilemma, candidates had to choose between buying a mountain bike for €100 each, or continuing on foot. At the third dilemma, candidates could trade in their mountain bike and continue on foot for last kilometre to earn €100 each.

€1,050 was earned for the pot.

Lumineus Idee

For the final assignment of the season, candidates enter Centrum Caolinum Nevřeň mine to find statements about the Mole’s performance throughout the season. They must individually collect the correct statements, which earn €100 each while the incorrect statements lose €100 each. The statements that the Mole collects are not counted towards the final total. Inside the mine is also a dilemma, where candidates can pay €250 for an envelope with a clue about the Mole; the envelope contains a smaller envelope and a candle.

=== Episode 10 – Finale ===
Episode 10 – Finale
Original airdates: 6 March 2021
Location: Amsterdam, Netherlands
Winner
Roxanne 'Rocky' Hehakaija
The Mole
Renée Fokker

== Mole sabotage ==
The following acts of sabotage were revealed at the finale.

Vriend of vijand: Renée shot Erik, therefore eliminating him from the assignment. She verbally provided incorrect codes for the chests containing money and purposely let herself get shot while holding €250. Throughout the assignment she feigned deafness, requiring other candidates to repeat information to her. She also encouraged the group to physically run and look at the lock combinations themselves (as opposed to verbally communicating them), increasing the risk of candidates being shot, as well as losing time.

De dans ontspringen?: Despite hearing the explorers clearly, Renée frequently repeated the information incorrectly, meaning the gatherers often opened incorrect ballerina boxes first which increased their risk of being shot. She also allowed herself to be shot while holding €350, thus losing the money.

Symbolisch bedrag: Renée provided the image of two incorrect signs which were subsequently run over.

Meeliften: Renée avoided giving the complete number of required correct answers for a question, feigning confusion for the final answers required.

Wie, wat... waar?: Renée suggested answers/observations she knew were incorrect.

Zekerheid bieden: As the Mole, Renée was told of Charlotte, Marije and Rocky's €5,000 bid. Knowing a substantial amount of money would be lost, she then only bid €1,000 for the advantage to avoid suspicion.

Steen goed: Renée switched the items inside the locker to ensure the wrong garments were selected and ultimately hoisted. She also lowered the correct garments hoisted by the other candidates during the assignment.

Aanwijzingen: Despite being given the list of songs beforehand, Renée did not provide any correct guesses. She also mouthed the words of several songs, meaning money would not be earned even if guessed correctly.

Voor joker staan: Renée intentionally switched the incorrect puzzle pieces despite correctly hearing the instructions from Rocky. She also switched puzzle pieces that were not instructed to be switched, guaranteeing the failure of the assignment.

Ra(a)dgeving: In Renée's first spin, the wheel landed on €2,000. When Rocky revealed to her that outcome benefits the pot, Renée rejected taking the money and elected to spin the wheel again.

== Hidden clues ==
The following clues were revealed in the finale or on the show's website:

Moltalk aftershow

- During the Moltalk aftershow on 21 December 2020, all candidates stood in a circle with screens above them before departing to film the season. The screens simultaneously played videos of each candidate mysteriously talking about whether they are the Mole or not. In her video. Renée reveals that she is the Mole.

Episode 1

- In the "Door een Deur" assignment, the envelope containing the dilemma reveals a secret clue when held up to a candle in the room reading "Aflevering 8 derde lied" (Episode 8 third song). This is a reference to the "Rij gedrag" assignment in episode 8 where the third song played was "The Lady in Red"; Renée frequently wore red clothing throughout the season.
- Episode 1 is titled "Geljik" (immediately/right away), and the episode's assignments immediately reveal clues to the Mole:
  - In the "Door eeen Deur" assignment, immediately after the word "Mol" was read aloud, Renée was the first candidate to be introduced to the viewers. Additionally, the Joker card that many candidates receive is modified with "WIE IS DE MOL?" instead of "Joker" as the card's text. The letter "I" in the text is unusually slanted. If positioned properly, the I would be horizontal and looks like a minus sign and "WIE" becomes "W − E", meaning the 23rd letter minus the 5th letter of the alphabet; this equals the 18th letter of the alphabet, R, which refers to Renée.
  - In the "Moltainbiken" assignment, only the wording of Renée's sign, which says she initially wanted to be the Mole, matched the wording in the question at the end of the track.

Episode 2

- Episode 2 is titled "Voorbeeld" which means "for example". However, voorbeeld is also a compound word of voor (for) and beeld (image/picture). During the "Om de tuin leiden" assignment, Renée was assigned the role of a photographer for the assignment.
- In the "De dans ontspringen?" assignment, the map of the monastery showed a section of rooms named after women, a reference to the TV series Vrouwenvleugel (Women's Wing) which Renée appeared in.

Episode 3

- In the "Kameraad" assignment, Charlotte and Renée were a duo. When Charlotte admitted she answered Renée to the question "Who is the Mole?" on the previous quiz, Renée responded with "Doesn't matter, very good."
- In the "Binnenvaart" assignment, the cave the four candidates kayaked through also contained projections of candidates talking about trust. Only Renée did not have a projection in the cave because she could not be trusted as the Mole.

Episode 4

- Episode 4 is titled "Voor het zeggen" which translates to "in charge" or "in control". In the "In vuur en vlam" assignment, Renée held the rope for the assignment in her hands, indicating she was in charge.

Episode 5

- Episode 5 is titled "Tot drie tellen" (count to three). After submitting a bid in the "Zekerheid bieden", Renée was counting to three while waiting for other candidates to make their bids.

Episode 6

- Episode 6 is titled "Wegstoppen" (tuck away). Renée tucks her Joker into her pocket during the episode. She also puts the money not claimed during the "Onder druk zetten" assignment in her pocket.
- In the "Ontsnappen" assignment, Renée knocks on the door of her cell three times, a reference to the Mole knocking on the door three times before giving candidate's their dilemma during the "Door een Deur" assignment in Episode 1.
- During the episode's execution, host Rik van de Westelaken mentions (with her approval) that Renée is the only candidate who is not nervous about the execution (as she won an Exemption). Rik then dubiously questions whether Renée is never nervous during executions, as the Mole cannot be eliminated, to which she nods subtly.

Episode 7

- Episode 7 is titled "Aanwijzing" (clue). During the execution, Rik gives candidates a clue by saying "This is the last time you will be together in this formation, with a Mole in your midst." Renée was sitting in the middle seat at the execution during this announcement.
- During the "Zinvol" assignment, a series of the chests are shown during the explanation of the assignment, including chests with "Renée" and "klopt" (knock) on them. This is a clue to the aforementioned knocking by Renée during the "Door een Deur" assignment (Episode 1) and the "Ontsnappen" assignment (Episode 6).

Episode 8

- Episode 8 is titled ""In één klap" (In One Fell Swoop). During the "Voor joker staan" assignment, if Renée swung the Joker puzzle (thereby messing up the pieces), she would become a Joker "in one fell swoop". Additionally, the assignment's title translates to "standing as a joker". During the assignment, Renée was the first candidate to stand at the Joker puzzle to attempt to solve it.

Episode 9

- The episode's title is "Kaarsrecht" (upright). However, kaarsrecht is also a compound word of kaars (candle) and recht (straight/right). During the "Lumineus Idee" assignment, Renée was the only candidate who bought the envelope with a clue about the Mole and held the candle "right" under the envelope to reveal the clue.

== Reception ==
=== Viewing figures ===
Viewing Figures
#	Title	Air Date	Time Slot	Average	Total
1	Gelijk	January 2, 2021	Saturday 20:30 CET	3,750,000	4,487,000
2	Voorbeeld	January 9, 2021	Saturday 20:30 CET	3,566,000	4,438,000
3	Vanaf hangen	January 16, 2021	Saturday 20:30 CET	3,453,000	4,274,000
4	Voor het zeggen	January 23, 2021	Saturday 20:30 CET	3,742,000	4,615,000
5	Tot drie tellen	January 30, 2021	Saturday 20:30 CET	3,714,000	4,628,000
6	Wegstoppen	February 6, 2021	Saturday 20:30 CET	3,614,000	4,409,000
7	Aanwijzing	February 13, 2021	Saturday 20:30 CET	3,532,000	4,429,000
8	In één klap	February 20, 2021	Saturday 20:30 CET	3,520,000	4,443,000
9	Kaarsrecht	February 27, 2021	Saturday 20:30 CET	3,448,000	4,169,000
10	De ontknoping (Finale)	March 6, 2021	Saturday 20:30 CET	3,528,000	4,375,000

== Controversy ==
In episode seven, the "Aanwijzingen" assignment required candidates to make the name of a song clear to others via movement and dance. After the episode aired, discussion arose on social media regarding the way contestant Charlotte Nijs attempted to communicate the song "Gangnam Style" by South Korean singer Psy. Nijs was seen performing a "slanted-eye" gesture while attempting to communicate the song, which fellow candidate Marije Knevel later imitated.

Knevel posted an apology on her social media following the airing of the episode. In response, this particular segment was removed for subsequent airings of the episode and AVROTROS addressed the situation on their social media.
