= Vinařice =

Vinařice may refer to places in the Czech Republic:

- Vinařice (Beroun District), a municipality and village in the Central Bohemian Region
- Vinařice (Kladno District), a municipality and village in the Central Bohemian Region
- Vinařice (Louny District), a municipality and village in the Ústí nad Labem Region
- Vinařice (Mladá Boleslav District), a municipality and village in the Central Bohemian Region
- Vinařice, a part of Jirkov in the Ústí nad Labem Region
- Vinařice, a village and part of Týnec nad Labem in the Central Bohemian Region
