= Rocky Hehakaija =

Dutch street football player and nonprofit executive

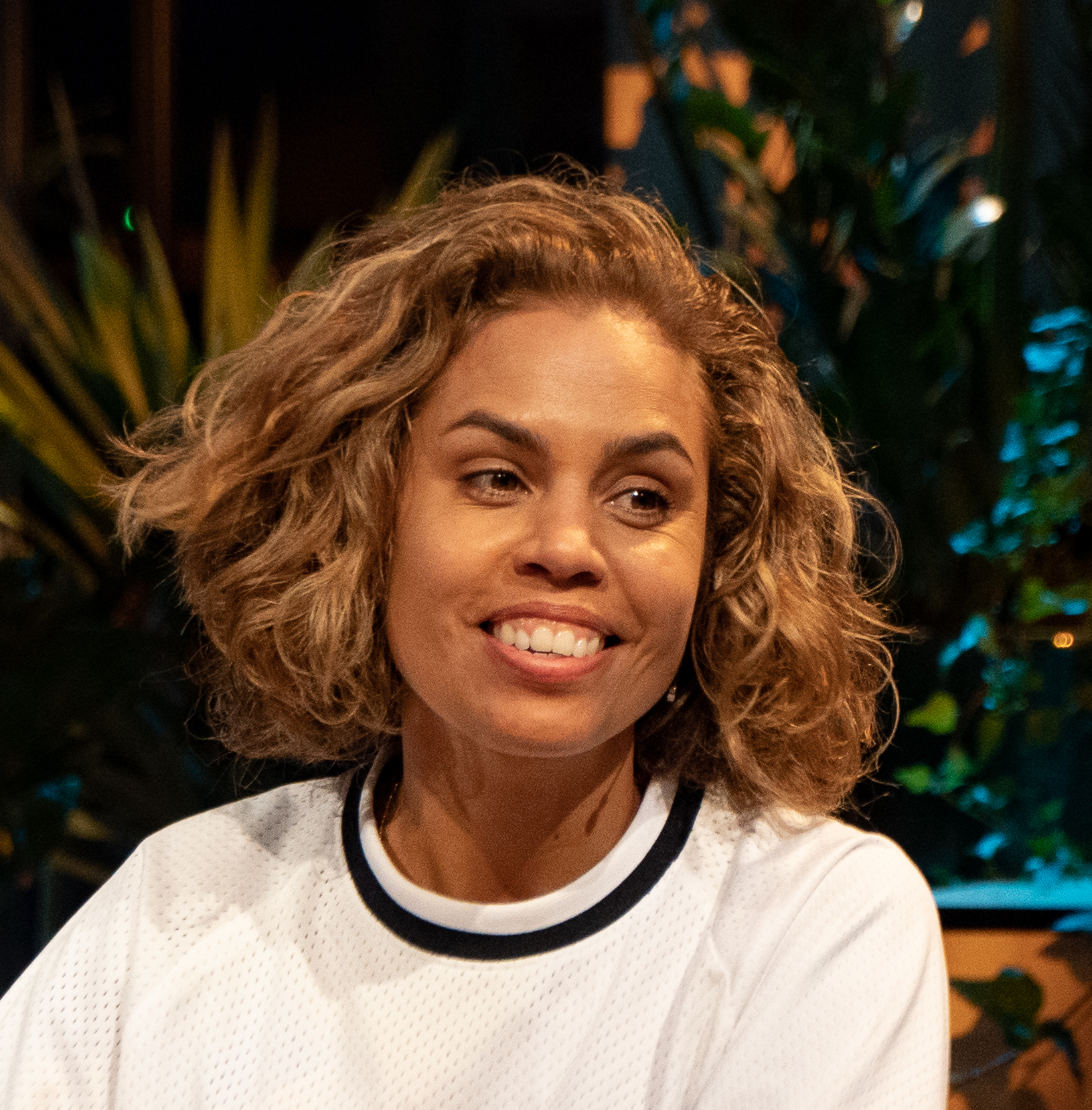
- Hehakaija in 2020
- Born: February 28, 1984 (age 42); Uithorn, Netherlands
- Occupations: street football player; nonprofit executive
- Honors: BBC 100 Women 2017

Roxanne "Rocky" Hehakaija (born 1984) is a Dutch street football player and nonprofit executive. She rose to fame as a member of Jong Oranje, the Dutch national under-21 football team, and toured as the only female member of Street Legends. She later shifted to leading international street football-focused nonprofit Favela Street. She was featured as a Legend in FIFA 20, and was one of the BBC 100 Women for 2017.

== Biography ==
She grew up in a high-rise apartment in the outskirts of Amsterdam, and always dreamed of becoming a professional football player. One of her greatest inspirations was her father, a football player himself. She ultimately wound up going into street football, becoming the first and only female member of Edgar Davids's team Street Legends and playing for the Netherlands national under-21 football team. But when she was just 21, she tore her ACL, and at 23 she became unable to continue playing. Outside of sports, she studied communication and marketing.

One thing that inspired her was a visit to the Favelas of Rio de Janeiro when she was 18. She saw how much joy and community was built as soon as the football got out onto the field. She has stated that this is one of the thigs that inspired her.

In 2012, she co-founded Favela Street, a NGO focused on community service and street football in marginalized communities. She soon took the lead, and with the help of a sports psychologist, expanded the program to launch projects in Haiti, Brazil, Curaçao, and Sudan, as well as her home in the Netherlands.

She is also a noted public speaker.

She won Season 21 of Wie is de mol?. She was featured as a Legend in FIFA 20. She was also featured as one of the BBC 100 Women of 2017.
