= Mořina =

- Municipality
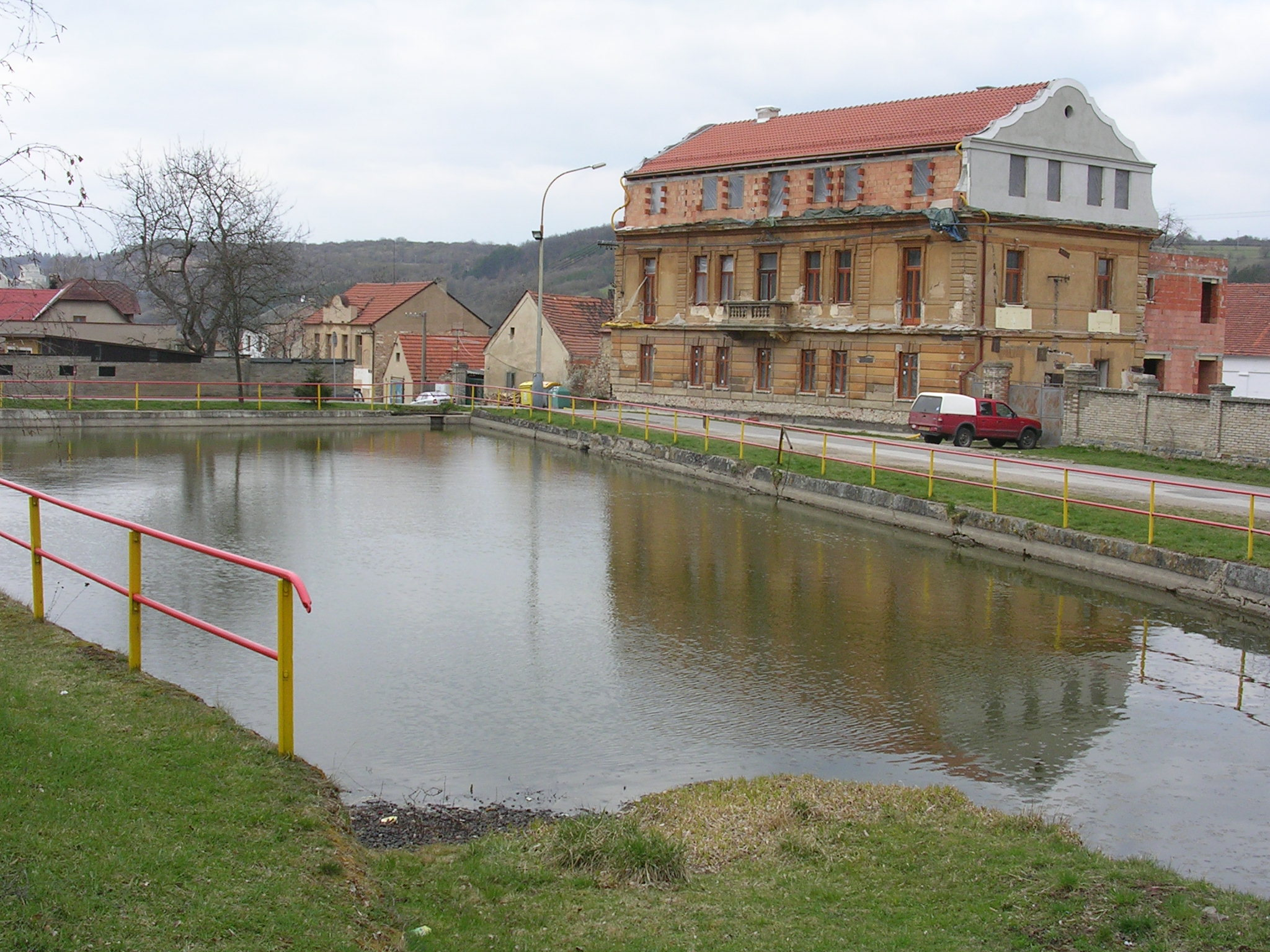
- Reservoir in the centre of Mořina

- Location in the Czech Republic
- Coordinates: 49°57′11″N 14°12′31″E
- Country: Czech Republic
- Region: Central Bohemian
- District: Beroun
- First mentioned: 1338

Area
  - Total: 9.83 km^{2} (3.80 sq mi)
- Elevation: 355 m (1,165 ft)

Population (2026-01-01)
  - Total: 964
  - Density: 98.1/km^{2} (254/sq mi)
- Time zone: UTC+1 (CET)
  - Summer (DST): UTC+2 (CEST)
- Postal codes: 267 17, 267 18
- Website: www.morina.cz

Mořina (German: Groß Morschin, Groß Morzin) is a municipality and village in Beroun District in the Central Bohemian Region of the Czech Republic. It has about 1,000 inhabitants.

== Administrative division ==
Mořina consists of three municipal parts (in brackets population according to the 2021 census):

- Mořina (742)
- Dolní Roblín (10)
- Trněný Újezd (92)

== Etymology ==
The name Mořina is derived from the Slavic goddess Morana. In 1353, a church was founded in the location of the burial ground dedicated to Morana, and the name of the burial ground was transferred to the village.

== Geography ==
Mořina is located about 10 kilometres (6 mi) east of Beroun and 14 km (9 mi) southwest of Prague. It lies on the border between the Hořovice Uplands and Prague Plateau. The highest point is the Výška hill at 425 m (1,394 ft) above sea level. The southern half of the municipal territory lies in the Bohemian Karst Protected Landscape Area.

Mořina is known for Velká Amerika, which is a picturesque former limestone quarry with a pair of lakes on the bottom.

== History ==
The first written mention of Mořina is in a document dating from between 1338 and 1352. At that time, King Charles IV donated the village to the Emmaus Monastery.

== Demographics ==
Historical population

Year	Pop.	±%
1869	616	—
1880	616	+0.0%
1890	712	+15.6%
1900	855	+20.1%
1910	840	−1.8%

Year	Pop.	±%
1921	874	+4.0%
1930	954	+9.2%
1950	710	−25.6%
1961	697	−1.8%
1970	647	−7.2%

Year	Pop.	±%
1980	541	−16.4%
1991	583	+7.8%
2001	594	+1.9%
2011	829	+39.6%
2021	844	+1.8%

Source: Censuses

== Transport ==
There are no railways or major roads passing through the municipality.

== Sights ==
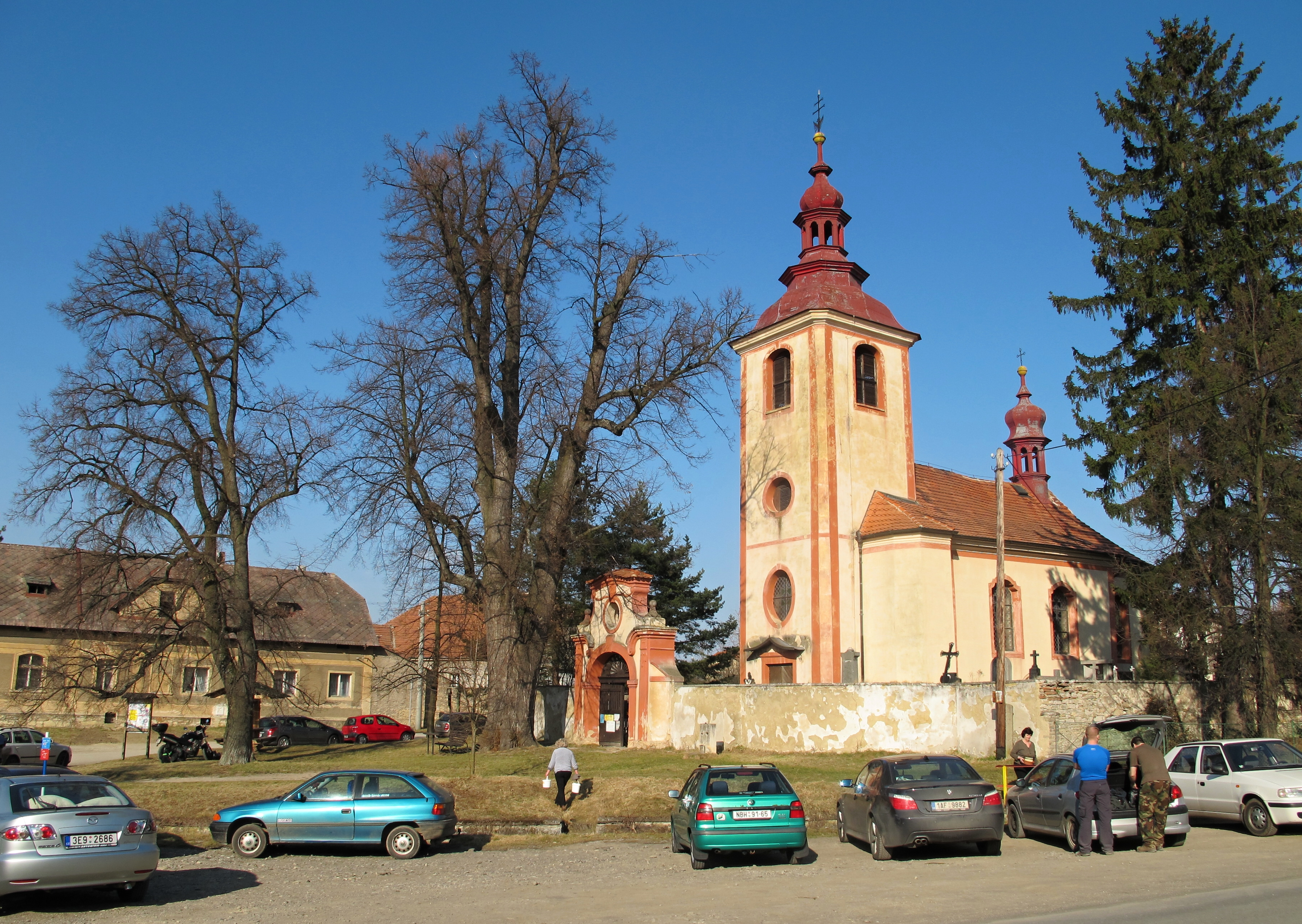
Church of Saint Stanislaus

The main landmark of Mořina is the Church of Saint Stanislaus. The original Gothic church from 1353 was rebuilt in the Baroque style in the 18th century.

A cultural monument is the Baroque Jewish cemetery. It was founded in 1735–1736 and consists of 150 preserved tombstones.

== Notable people ==
- Jakob Eduard Polak (1818–1891), Austrian medical doctor
