= Velká Amerika =

Limestone quarry in Mořina, Czech Republic

Coordinates: 49°57′30″N 14°11′50″E

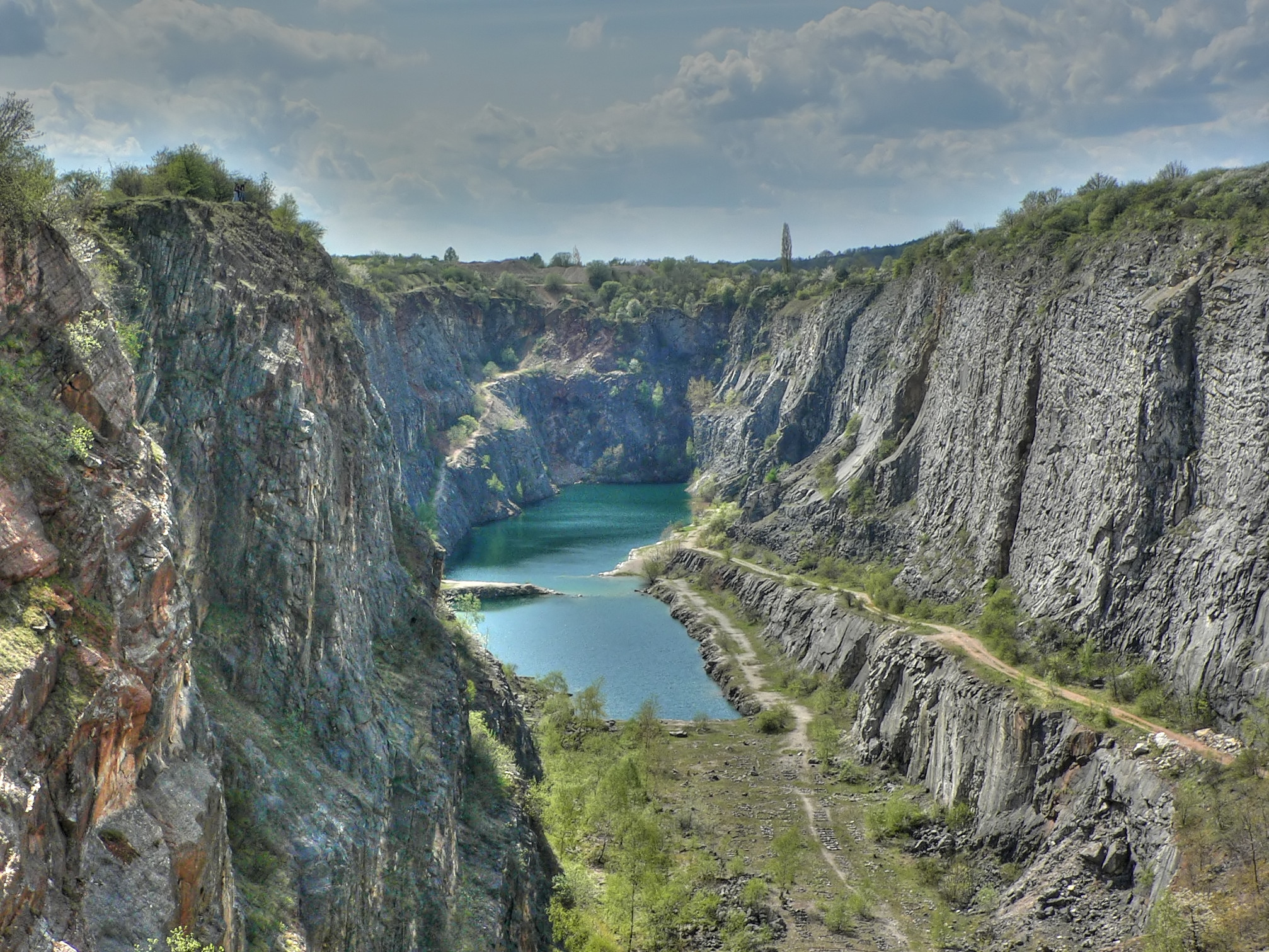
Lakes in the quarry

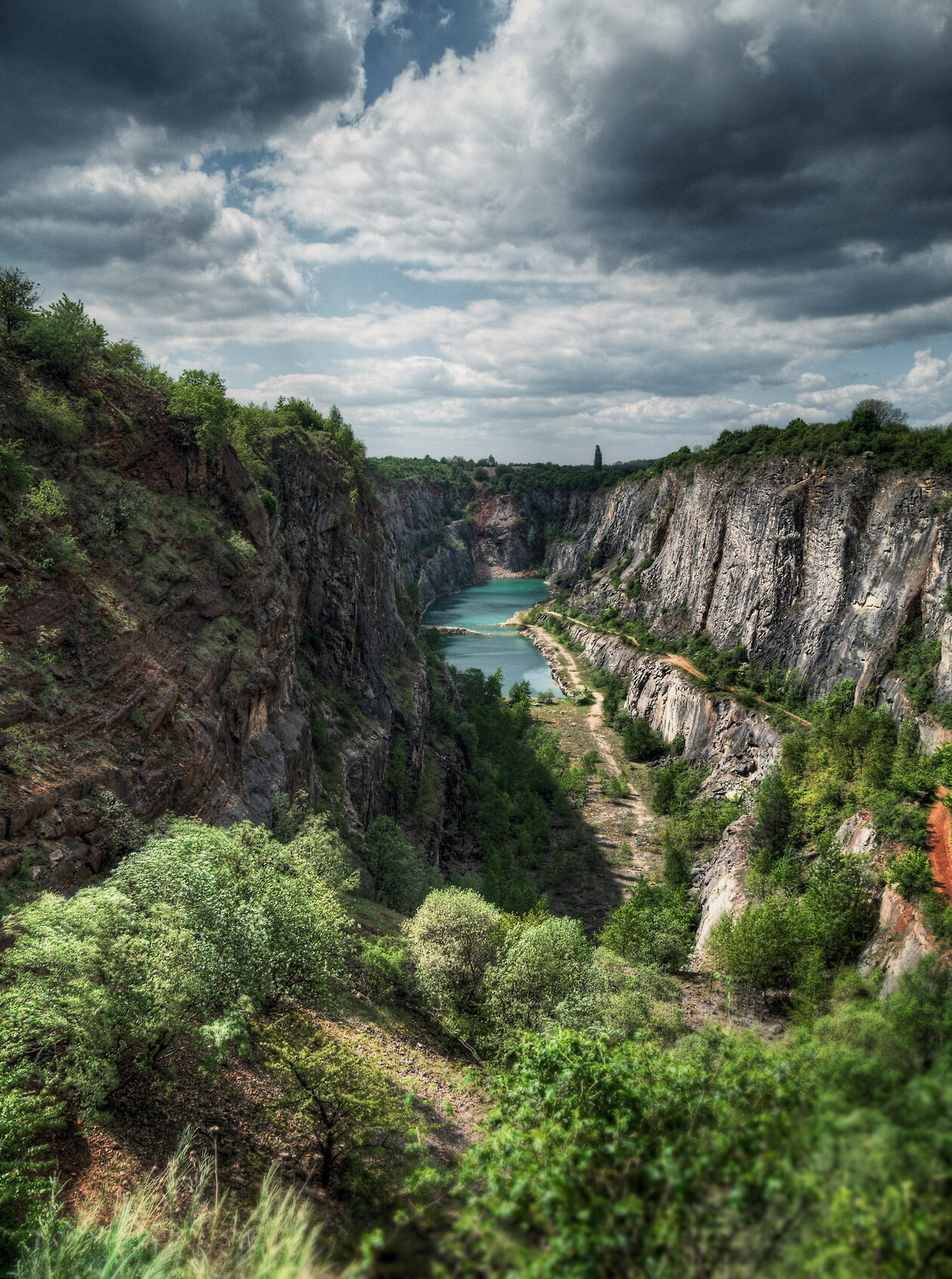
View through the quarry

Velká Amerika (lit. 'big America') is a partly flooded and abandoned limestone quarry in the Mořina municipality in the Central Bohemian Region of the Czech Republic. It lies about 15 km (9 mi) southwest of Prague.

== Description ==
Velká Amerika is 800 m (2,600 ft) long, 200 m (660 ft) wide and up to 100 m (330 ft) deep quarry with an 18 m (59 ft) deep pair of lakes on the bottom. It is nicknamed "Czech Grand Canyon".

There are other smaller quarries west of Velká Amerika, including Malá Amerika ('small America'), Mexiko and Kanada. The quarries are connected with each other by long tunnels.

== History ==
In the 20th century, this quarry served as a place where political prisoners were made to mine limestone. There is a memorial in place for them. There are many urban legends tied to the quarry, one notable myth being the legend of Hans Hagen, a spectre featuring an SS uniform supposedly responsible for many deaths and disappearances.

== Tourism ==
The quarry is popular stop for tourists, and there are several lookout points across it. It is sought after by professional divers, but due to the risk of injury, entry into the quarry is permanently forbidden.

== In popular culture ==
Velká Amerika has been used many times by Czech filmmakers, notably in Lemonade Joe and Accumulator 1. It was also the location of the Noelite convent in the film Babylon A.D.
