= Nevřeň =

- Municipality
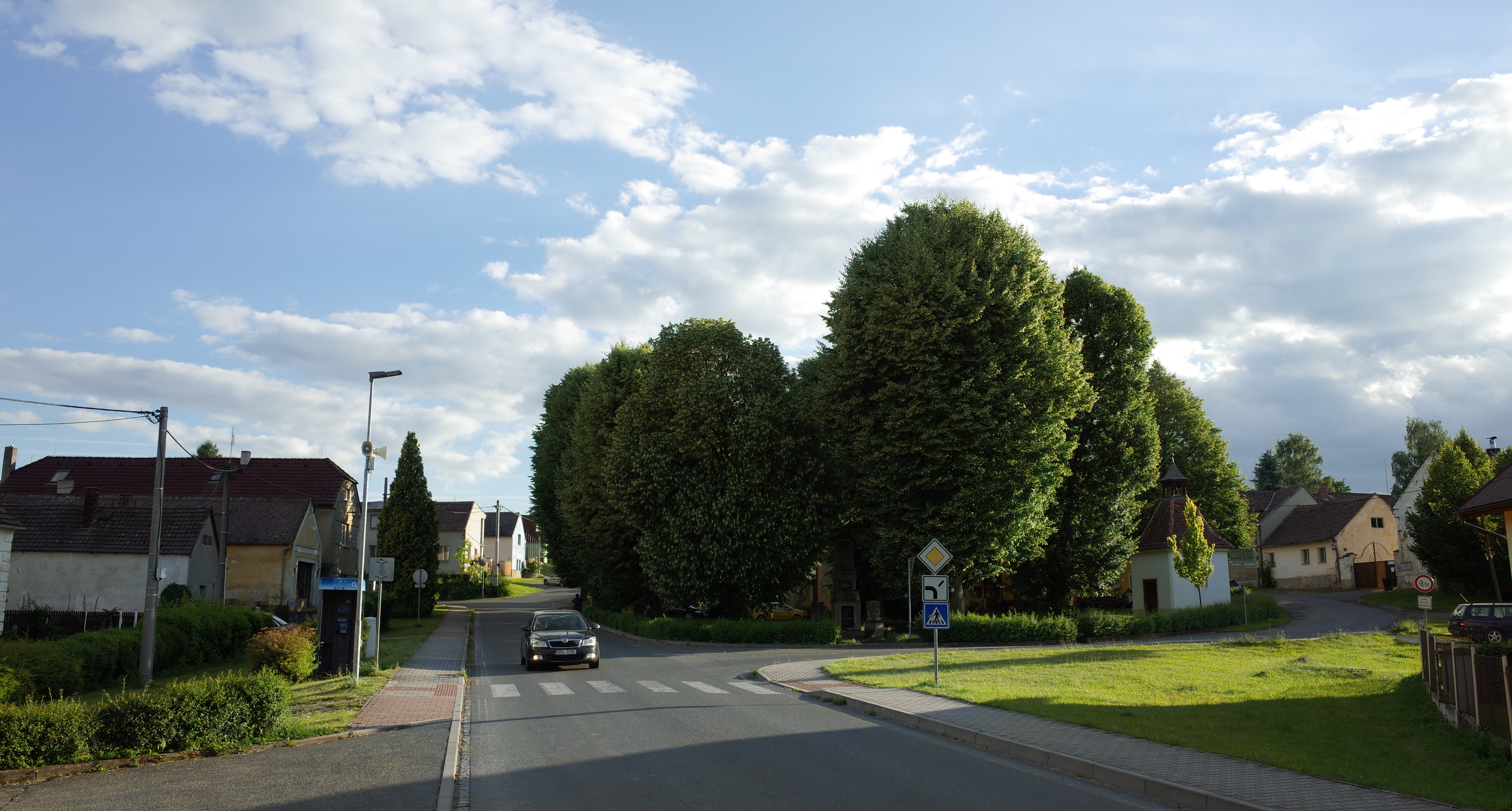
- Centre of Nevřeň

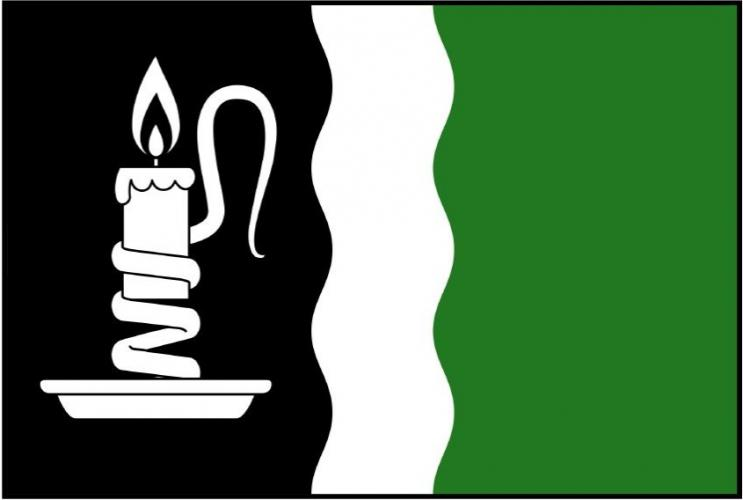
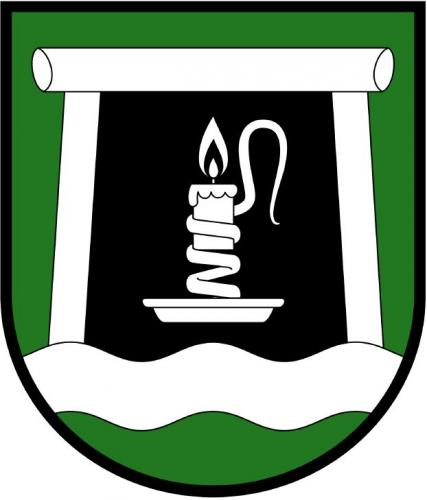
- Flag Coat of arms

- Location in the Czech Republic
- Coordinates: 49°49′23″N 13°16′30″E
- Country: Czech Republic
- Region: Plzeň
- District: Plzeň-North
- First mentioned: 1364

Area
  - Total: 6.33 km^{2} (2.44 sq mi)
- Elevation: 398 m (1,306 ft)

Population (2026-01-01)
  - Total: 302
  - Density: 47.7/km^{2} (124/sq mi)
- Time zone: UTC+1 (CET)
  - Summer (DST): UTC+2 (CEST)
- Postal code: 330 11
- Website: www.nevren.cz

Nevřeň is a municipality and village in Plzeň-North District in the Plzeň Region of the Czech Republic. It has about 300 inhabitants.

Nevřeň lies approximately 12 kilometres (7 mi) north-west of Plzeň and 88 km (55 mi) west of Prague.

== Demographics ==
Historical population
Year	Pop.	±%
1869	392	—
1880	318	−18.9%
1890	321	+0.9%
1900	322	+0.3%
1910	368	+14.3%
1921	512	+39.1%
1930	364	−28.9%
1950	353	−3.0%
1961	316	−10.5%
1970	290	−8.2%
1980	243	−16.2%
1991	185	−23.9%
2001	210	+13.5%
2011	268	+27.6%
2021	296	+10.4%
Source: Censuses
