= Vinařice (Beroun District) =

- Municipality
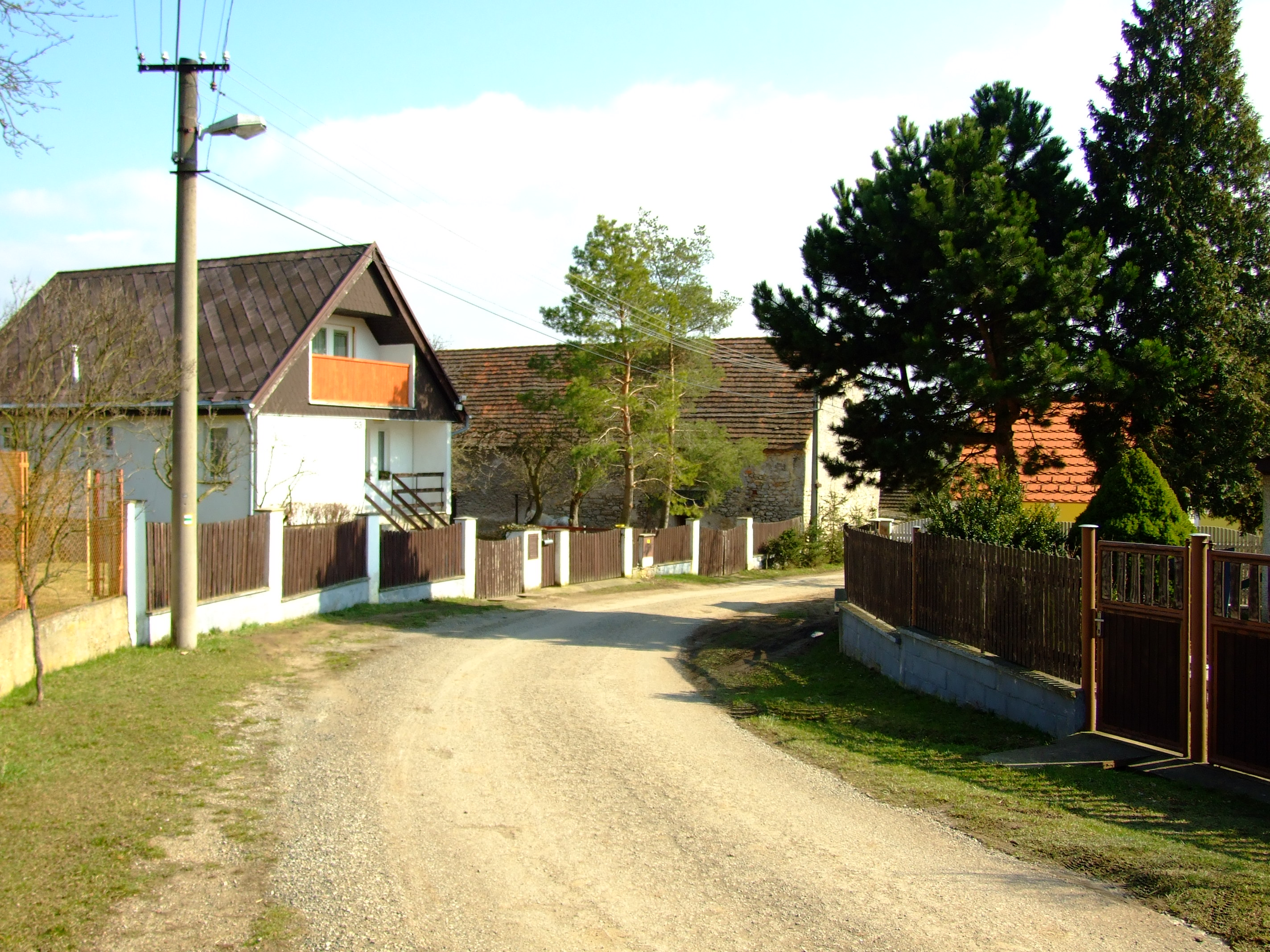
- Road through Vinařice

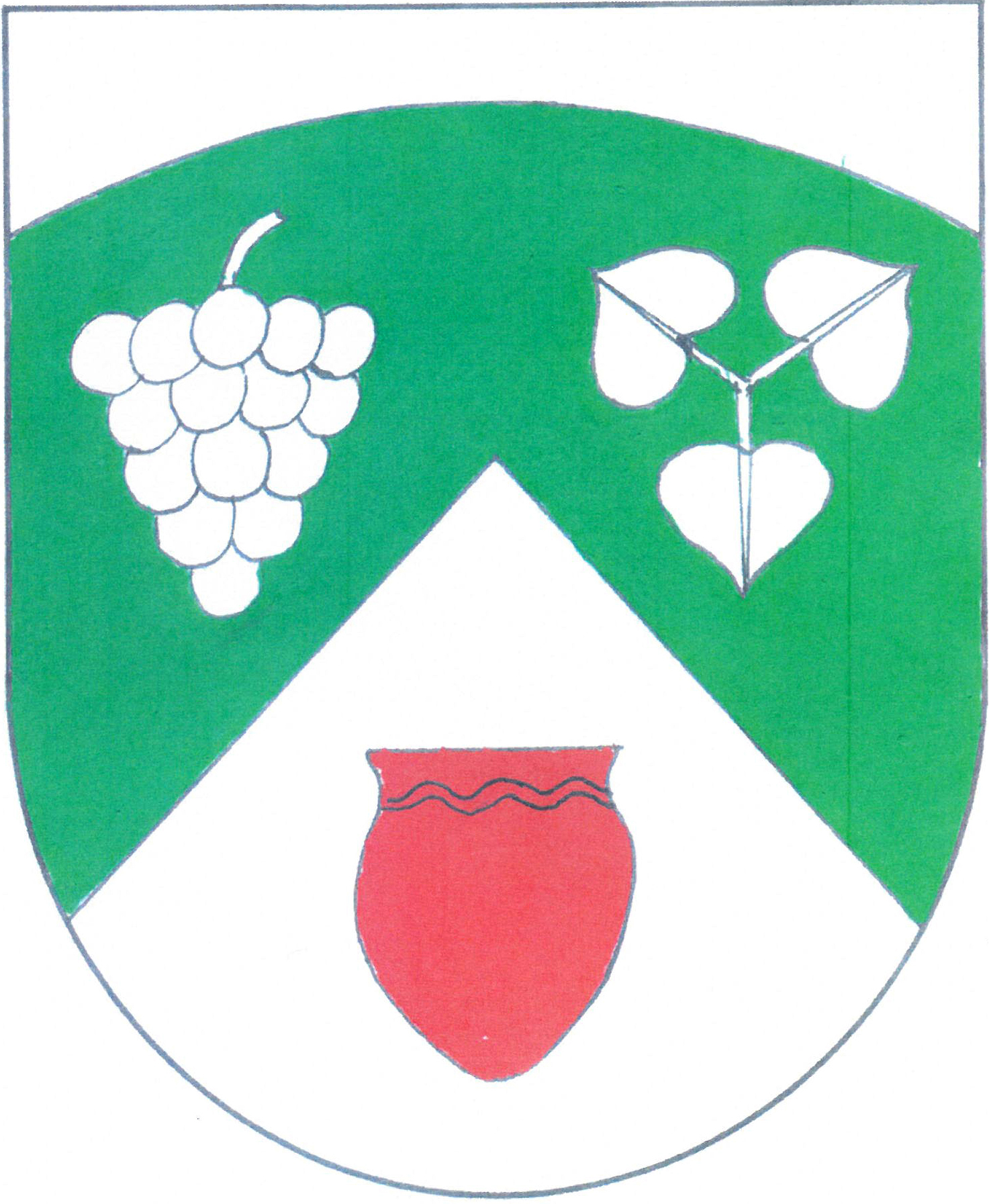
- Flag Coat of arms

- Location in the Czech Republic
- Coordinates: 49°53′33″N 14°5′53″E
- Country: Czech Republic
- Region: Central Bohemian
- District: Beroun
- First mentioned: 1170

Area
  - Total: 4.95 km^{2} (1.91 sq mi)
- Elevation: 410 m (1,350 ft)

Population (2026-01-01)
  - Total: 109
  - Density: 22.0/km^{2} (57.0/sq mi)
- Time zone: UTC+1 (CET)
  - Summer (DST): UTC+2 (CEST)
- Postal code: 267 01
- Website: www.vinarice.info

Vinařice is a municipality and village in Beroun District in the Central Bohemian Region of the Czech Republic. It has about 100 inhabitants.

== Demographics ==
Historical population
Year	Pop.	±%
1869	278	—
1880	272	−2.2%
1890	272	+0.0%
1900	274	+0.7%
1910	248	−9.5%
1921	236	−4.8%
1930	228	−3.4%
1950	167	−26.8%
1961	162	−3.0%
1970	151	−6.8%
1980	114	−24.5%
1991	79	−30.7%
2001	87	+10.1%
2011	90	+3.4%
2021	118	+31.1%
Source: Censuses
