= Vinařice (Kladno District) =

- Municipality
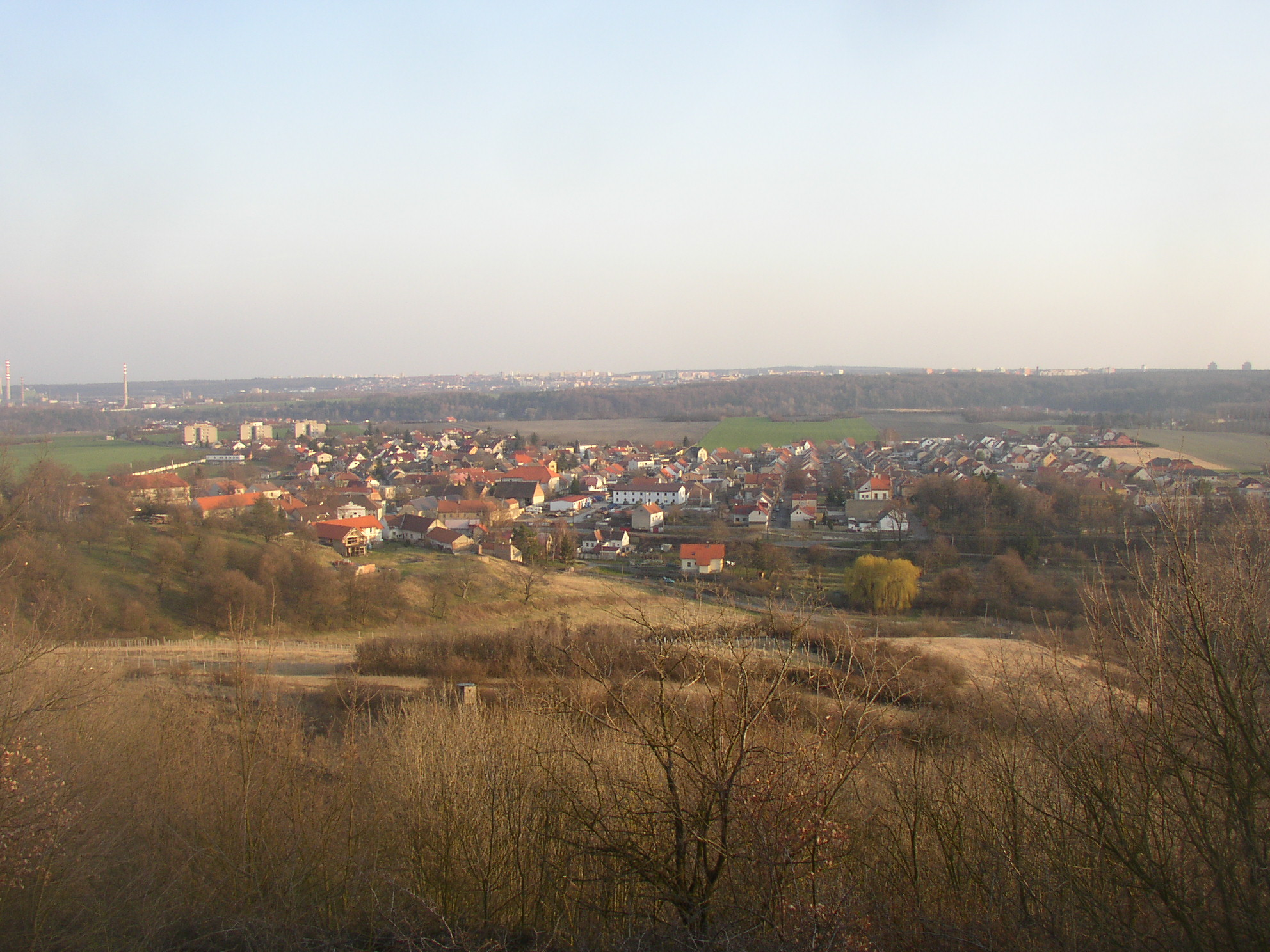
- View from the north

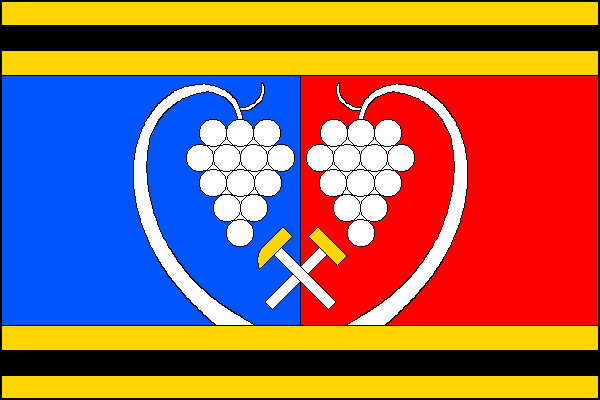
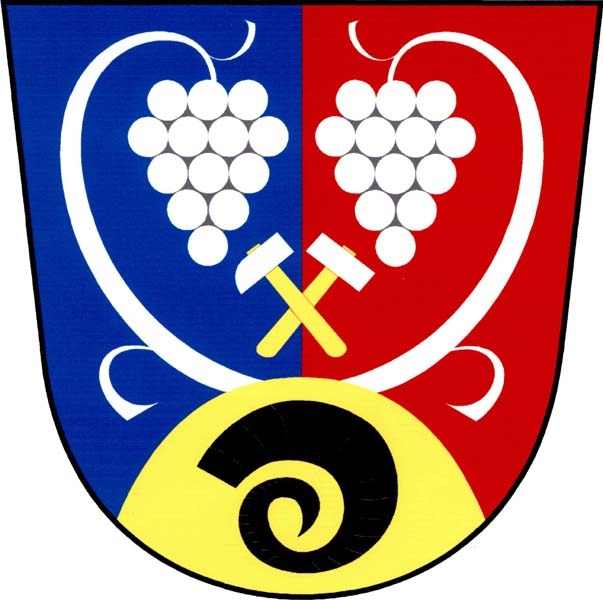
- Flag Coat of arms

- Location in the Czech Republic
- Coordinates: 50°10′33″N 14°5′28″E
- Country: Czech Republic
- Region: Central Bohemian
- District: Kladno
- First mentioned: 1277

Area
  - Total: 5.16 km^{2} (1.99 sq mi)
- Elevation: 347 m (1,138 ft)

Population (2026-01-01)
  - Total: 2,137
  - Density: 414/km^{2} (1,070/sq mi)
- Time zone: UTC+1 (CET)
  - Summer (DST): UTC+2 (CEST)
- Postal code: 273 07
- Website: www.ouvinarice.cz

Vinařice is a municipality and village in Kladno District in the Central Bohemian Region of the Czech Republic. It has about 2,100 inhabitants.

== Etymology ==
The name has its origin in vinařci, which meant 'little winemakers'. The name was then distorted into its present form.

== Geography ==
Vinařice is located about 4 kilometres (2 mi) north of Kladno and 20 km (12 mi) northwest of Prague. It lies in the Prague Plateau. The highest point is the hill Vinařická hora at 413 m (1,355 ft) above sea level.

== History ==
The first written mention of Vinařice is from 1277, when King Ottokar II donated or bestowed the village to the Ostrov Monastery in Davle. The monastery owned Vinařice until the Hussite Wars, and then it belonged to unknown nobles. In 1654, it was documented as part of the Smečno estate, owned by the Martinic family.

Black coal was mined in Vinařice from 1874 to 1987. The consequence of the developing industry was the development of the municipality and the growth of the population.

== Demographics ==
Historical population

| Year | Pop. | ±% |
|---|---|---|
| 1869 | 255 | — |
| 1880 | 512 | +100.8% |
| 1890 | 854 | +66.8% |
| 1900 | 1,585 | +85.6% |
| 1910 | 2,115 | +33.4% |

| Year | Pop. | ±% |
|---|---|---|
| 1921 | 2,052 | −3.0% |
| 1930 | 2,176 | +6.0% |
| 1950 | 2,308 | +6.1% |
| 1961 | 2,344 | +1.6% |
| 1970 | 2,109 | −10.0% |

| Year | Pop. | ±% |
|---|---|---|
| 1980 | 1,947 | −7.7% |
| 1991 | 1,731 | −11.1% |
| 2001 | 1,704 | −1.6% |
| 2011 | 2,902 | +70.3% |
| 2021 | 2,811 | −3.1% |

Source: Censuses

== Economy ==
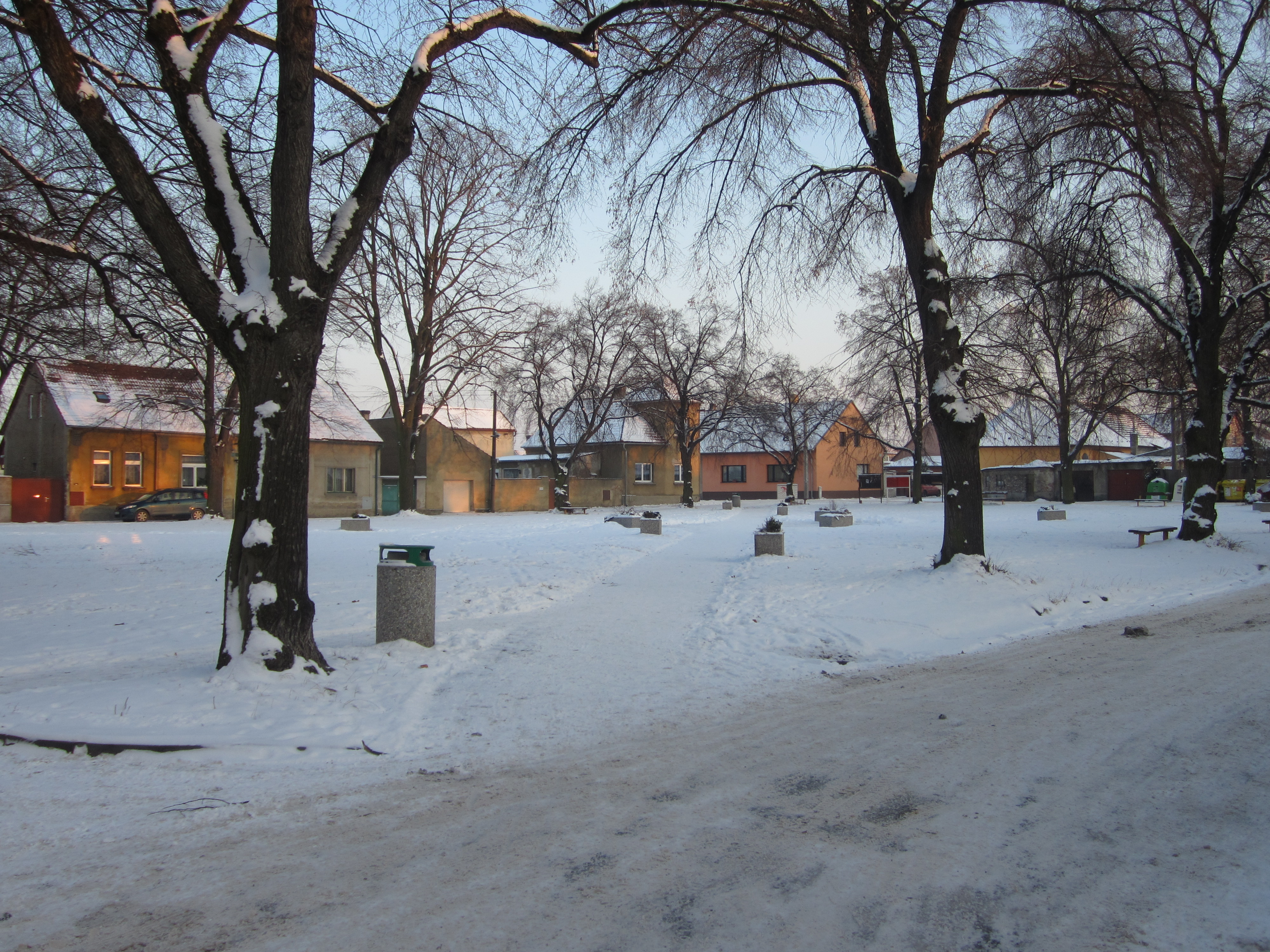
Centre of Vinařice

The Vinařice Prison is the main employer in Vinařice. It is classified as a medium- and high-security prison for men. It employs more than 300 people and its capacity is 854 prisoners.

== Transport ==
There are no major roads passing through the municipality. The railway that runs through the municipality is unused.

== Sights ==
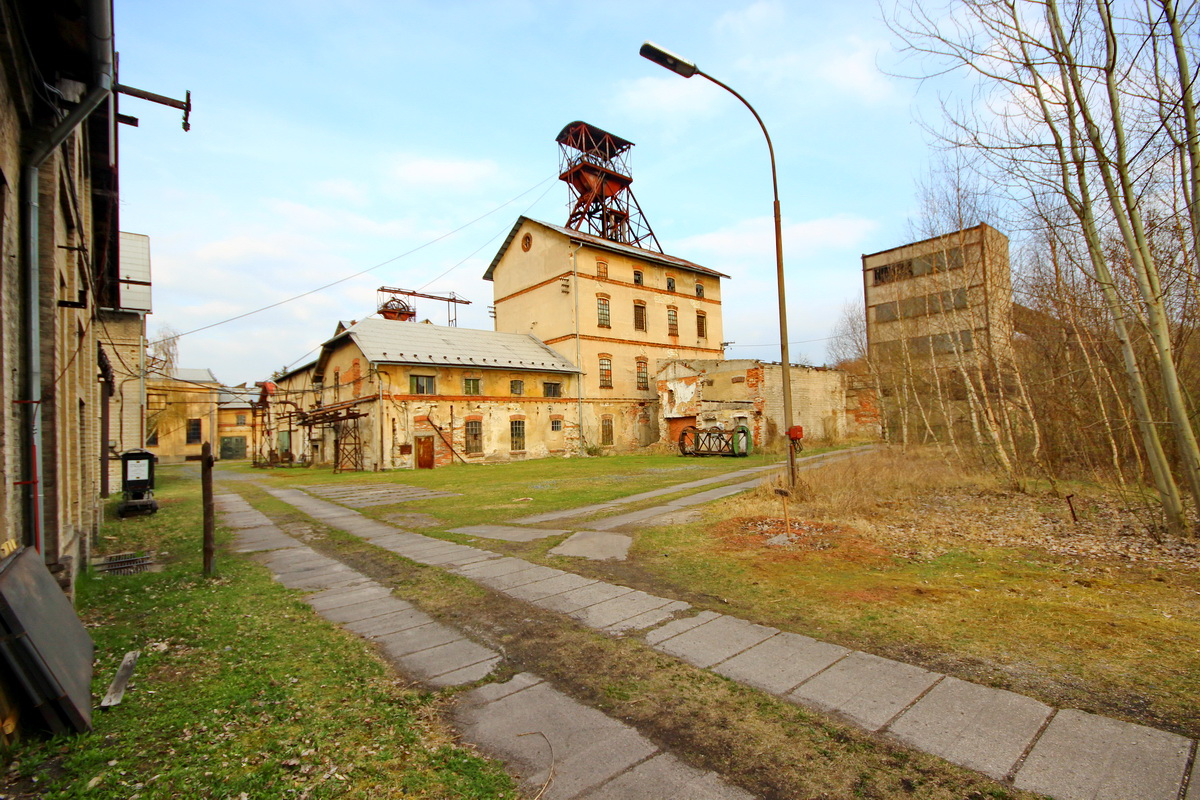
Mining open-air museum

The most important monument is the former Mayrau Mine. The complex includes several buildings and well-preserved mining machinery. Today it houses a mining open-air museum.

A historical landmark of the centre of Vinařice is a small chapel from the first half of the 18th century.
