= Vinařice (Mladá Boleslav District) =

- Municipality
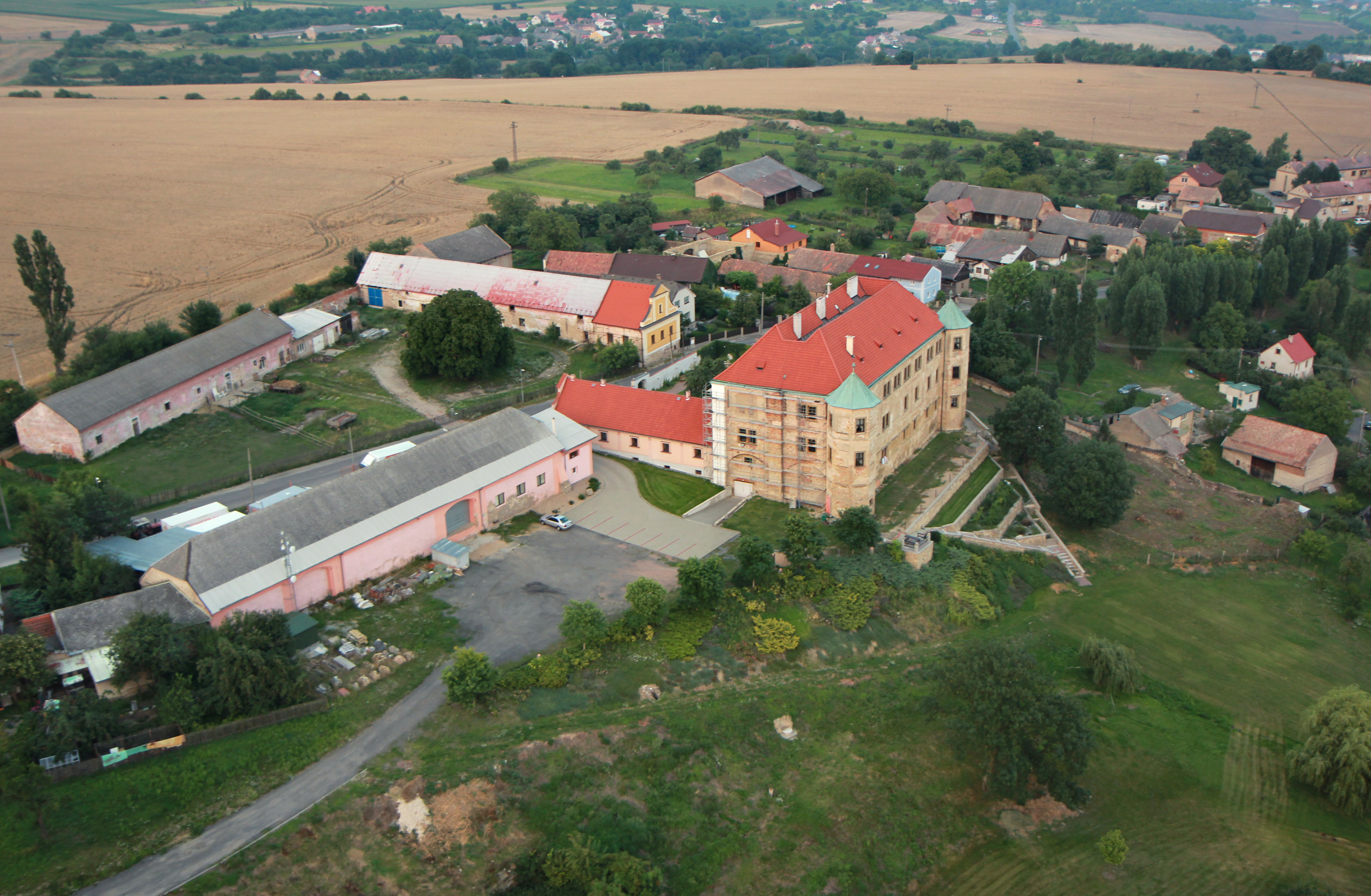
- Aerial view of the Vinařice Castle

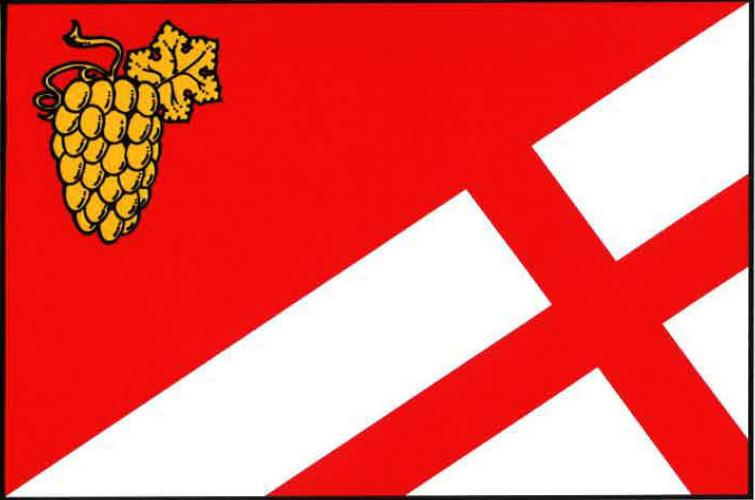
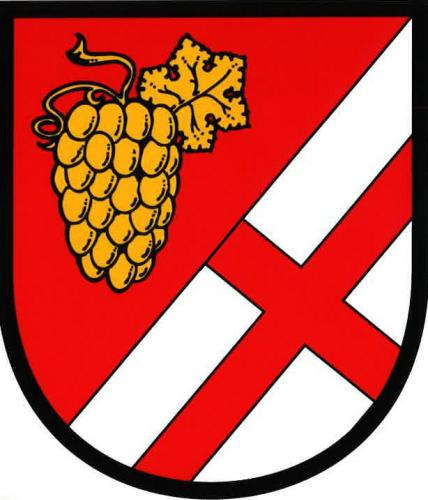
- Flag Coat of arms

- Location in the Czech Republic
- Coordinates: 50°22′26″N 14°57′9″E
- Country: Czech Republic
- Region: Central Bohemian
- District: Mladá Boleslav
- First mentioned: 1227

Area
  - Total: 4.49 km^{2} (1.73 sq mi)
- Elevation: 303 m (994 ft)

Population (2026-01-01)
  - Total: 290
  - Density: 65/km^{2} (170/sq mi)
- Time zone: UTC+1 (CET)
  - Summer (DST): UTC+2 (CEST)
- Postal code: 294 41
- Website: www.obecvinarice.cz

Vinařice is a municipality and village in Mladá Boleslav District in the Central Bohemian Region of the Czech Republic. It has about 300 inhabitants.

== Etymology ==
The oldest name of the village was Vinařci, which meant 'little winemakers'. The name was then distorted into its present form.

== Geography ==
Vinařice is located about 5 km (3 mi) south of Mladá Boleslav and 43 km (27 mi) northeast of Prague. It lies mostly in the Jičín Uplands, the southern part of the municipal territory extends into the Jizera Table. The highest point is the hill Kněžský at 366 m (1,201 ft) above sea level.

== History ==
The first written mention of Vinařice is in a deed of Agnes of Bohemia from 1227, when it was a property of the St. George's Convent in Prague. Soon it became property of the lords of Chlum, who held it until 1403, after that it changed owners frequently. The most notable owners of Vinařice were the Waldstein family (1623–1734), who joined it to the Dobrovice estate.

== Demographics ==
Historical population

Year	Pop.	±%
1869	434	—
1880	452	+4.1%
1890	463	+2.4%
1900	496	+7.1%
1910	491	−1.0%

Year	Pop.	±%
1921	507	+3.3%
1930	455	−10.3%
1950	320	−29.7%
1961	334	+4.4%
1970	314	−6.0%

Year	Pop.	±%
1980	271	−13.7%
1991	225	−17.0%
2001	248	+10.2%
2011	278	+12.1%
2021	309	+11.2%

Source: Censuses

== Transport ==
The train station named Dobrovice on the railway line Mladá Boleslav–Nymburk, which mainly serves the neighbouring town of Dobrovice, is located in the southern tip of the territory of Vinařice.

== Sights ==
The main landmark of Vinařice is the Vinařice Castle. It was created by the Renaissance rebuilding of the old fortress, which took place in two phases in the 16th century and around 1630. Later, Baroque modifications were made. Today, the castle is privately owned. It is used for social purposes and as a hotel.
