= Silesian independence =

Separatism in Poland and the Czech Republic

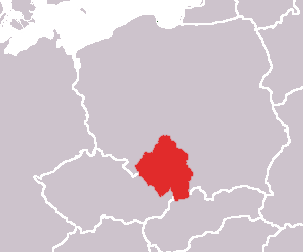
Upper Silesia is in Poland, to the north-east of the Czech Republic (present day)

Silesian independence (Silesian: Samostanowjyńo Ślůnska; Polish: Niepodległość Śląska) is the political movement for Upper Silesia and Cieszyn Silesia to become a sovereign state.

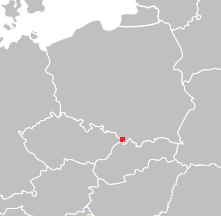
Cieszyn Silesia (present day)

Since the 9th century, Upper Silesia has been part of Greater Moravia, the Duchy of Bohemia, the Piast Kingdom of Poland, again of the Lands of the Bohemian Crown and the Holy Roman Empire, as well as of the Habsburg monarchy from 1526. In 1742 the greater part of Upper Silesia was annexed by the Kingdom of Prussia, and in 1871 it became part of the German Empire. After the First World War the region was divided between Poland (East Upper Silesia) and Germany (West Upper Silesia).

After the Second World War, West Upper Silesia also became Polish as the result of the Potsdam Conference.

From 1920 to 1939 the Silesian Voivodeship (Polish: Województwo Śląskie) was an autonomous province (voivodeship) of the Second Polish Republic with its own parliament. Autonomous powers were formally repealed by a law of 6 May 1945.

Organizations supporting the Silesian independence in 20th century was Silesian People's Party, Association of Defense of Upper Silesians, Union of Upper Silesians. According to some, the party supporting the independence of Upper Silesia is the Silesian Autonomy Movement (RAŚ), established in 1990. Fear of separatism, instead of officially declared autonomy, was flamed up by some publications in RAŚ's official magazine. Articles were published that openly called for a sovereign, independent Silesian state. Also politicians of Silesians Together does not exclude the support of the project of the independent Silesian state in the event that this project is supported by the majority of Silesians. From 2007 to 2010, the Silesian Separatist Movement listed "national and territorial separation of Silesia from Poland" and "the sanctioning of Silesian nationality" as its main goals.

== History ==
=== Silesian nationality ===
Silesian flag as used by Silesian Autonomy Movement

There have been some debates on whether or not the Silesians (historically, Upper Silesians) constitute a distinct nation. In modern history, they have often been pressured to declare themselves to be German, Polish or Czech, and use the language of the nation which was in control of Silesia. Nevertheless, 847,000 people declared themselves to be of Silesian nationality in the 2011 Polish national census (including 376,000 who declared it to be their only nationality, 436,000 who declared to be their first nationality, 411,000 who declared to be their second one, and 431,000 who declared joint Silesian and Polish nationality), making them the largest minority group. About 126,000 people declared themselves as members of the German minority (58,000 declared it jointly with Polish nationality), making it the third largest minority group in the country (93% of Germans living in Poland are in the Polish part of Silesia). 12,231 people declared themselves to be of Silesian nationality in the Czech national census of 2011 (44,446 in Czechoslovakia in 1991), and 6,361 people declared joint Silesian and Moravian nationality in the Slovak national census.

=== The Silesian People's Party ===
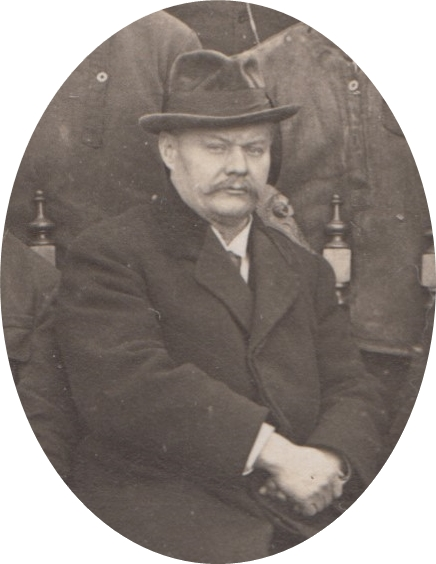
Józef Kożdoż, leader of the Silesian People's Party. Kożdoń wrote: "I'm not a German, but I'm not and I don't want to be a Pole, too. I'm Polish speaking Silesian [...] A language commonwealth don't decide about a national union, deciding factor is spirit commonwealth. Silesia has this commonwealth – own separate land's traditions".

The Silesian People's Party was founded in summer of 1908 by the principal of an elementary school, Józef Kożdoń, in Skoczów. On 7 February 1909, the party counted about 2,000 members in 30 local groups in the counties of Bielsko, Cieszyn and Fryštát. Local groups in Frydek county formed later. Members and electors of the SPP came from Protestant circles among the citizens of Cieszyn Silesia, so the largest organizations within the party existed in Bielsko and Cieszyn, where large Protestant communities lived. The party's largest local groups, as of 1913, existed in Skoczów (214 members) and Cieszyn (210 members).

The goals of the SPP were not new – similar sentiments had been present in Cieszyn Silesia since the Revolutions of 1848 – but this was the first time that supporters of Silesian independence were organized into a distinct political party. Silesian nationalist positions were first advocated by the Union of Austrian Silesians, which was founded in 1848 by Silesian deputies of the Austrian Parliament: Franz Hein, Hans Kudlich and Johann Demel von Elswehr. Such sentiments were also voiced informally by community institutions, like the paper Nowy Czas (New Time), edited by preacher Theodor Haase. "The Szlonzakian movement had expanded in the nineties of the 19th century, collecting Slavic people who didn’t want to vote for Poles or Czechs and chose attachment to a separate Silesian nation". Silesian nationalism achieved successes mainly in the judicial districts of Skoczów, Strumień and Frydek.

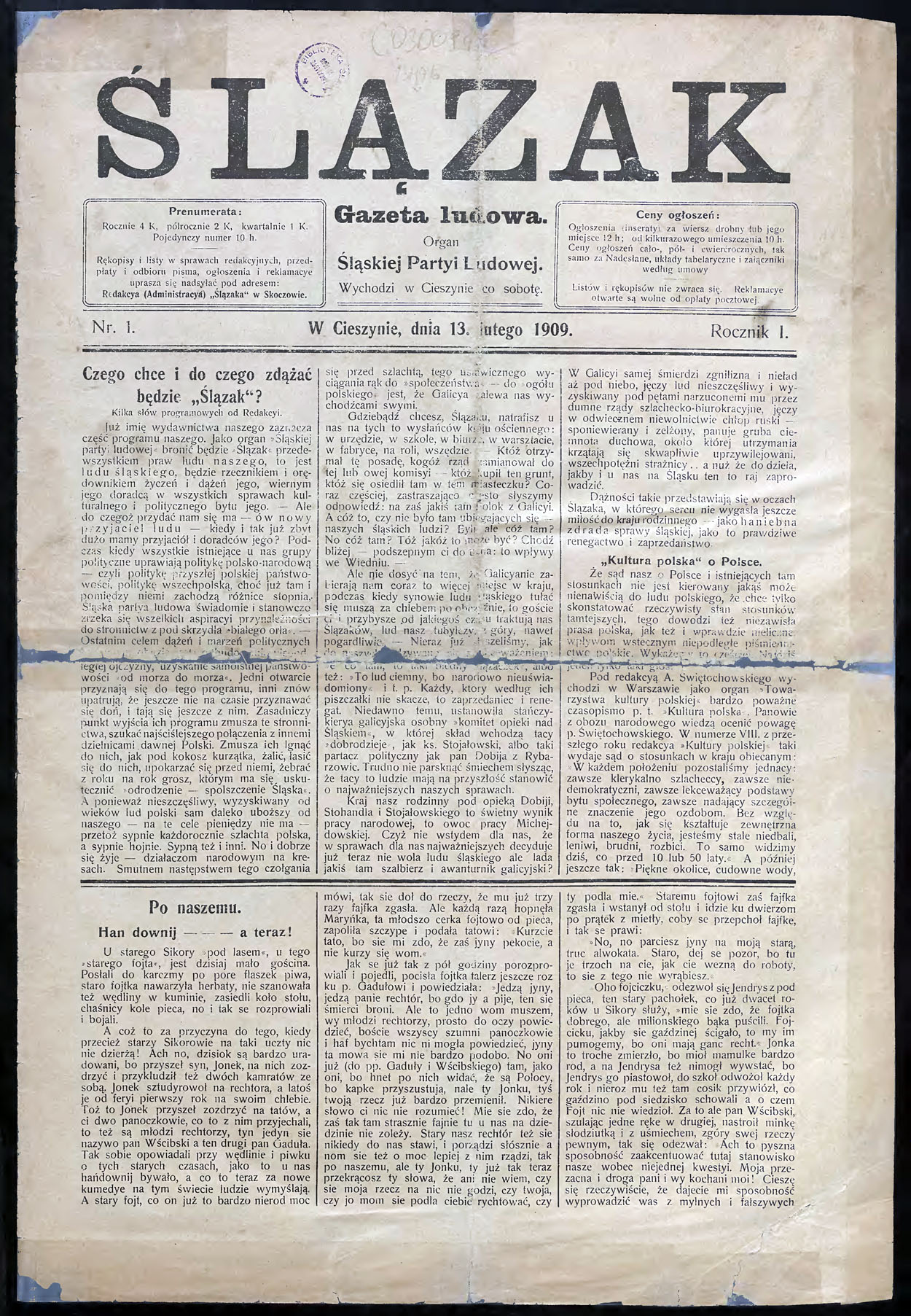
Front page of the Silesian magazine, 13 February 1909

In July 1910, the non-political cultural base of Silesian People's Party was formed: the Union of Silesians (Polish: Związek Ślązaków, German: Bund der Schlesier, Czech: Svaz Slezanů), founded by Kożdoń, Cichy, and Paul Wania, originally under the name Silesian People's Union "Our Homeland" (Polish: Śląski Związek Ludowy "Nasza Ojczyzna", German: Schlesischer Volksverband "Unsere Heimat"). From 1909 to 1923 the official paper of the Silesian People's Party was the weekly Ślązak (Silesian).

In 1911 there were local elections in Austria. The SPP won in 39 municipalities of the counties of Bielsko and Cieszyn: Jaworze and Jasienica in the judicial district of Bielsko; Bładnice Dolne, Cisownica, Goleszów, Godziszów, Górki Wielkie, Harbutowice, Hermanice, Kozakowice Górne, Kozakowice Dolne, Łączka, Międzyświeć, Nierodzim, Simoradz, Wieszczęta, Wilamowice and Ustroń (here with a coalition of Szlonzakians and Germans) in the judicial district of Skoczów; Bąków, Drogomyśl, Pruchna, Zaborze and Rudzica (here with a coalition of Szlonzakians and Poles) in the judicial district of Strumień; Bażanowice, Dzięgielów, Gumna, Konská, Leszna Górna, Komorní Lhotka, Nebory, Puńców, Svibice, Zamarski, Horní Žukov and Šumbark (here with a coalition of Szlonzakians and Poles) in the judicial district of Cieszyn; Lyžbice, Mosty u Jablunkova and Oldřichovice in the judicial district of Jablunkov.

In 1911 there were also elections to the Austrian Parliament in Vienna. SPP candidates lost many socialist votes and were defeated by Polish and Czech candidates. Kożdoń did not even win in majority municipalities that his party had ruled in local elections. Eight municipalities around Bielsko, called a "German language island", which had voted for Kożdoń in the Silesian Parliament elections in 1909, constituted an exception within the rural Bielsko electoral district. Kożdoń won 26% of the votes in the Bielsko electoral district and 19% of the votes in the Cieszyn electoral district. Louis Schindler took 7.5% votes in the Frydek electoral district.

In the period when Cieszyn Silesia belonged to Austria-Hungary, the Silesian People's Party reached the largest popularity in the triangle between Cieszyn, Wisła and Strumień, centering on Skoczów, Jaworze, Ustroń and Goleszów. After World War I members of Silesian People's Party hoped to get Austrian Silesia a place as a free state in the federation of Austrian states. When this effort failed, they pushed for the independence of Cieszyn Silesia and probably a union with the formerly Prussian Upper Silesia. Upper Silesia's independence was advocated by the Upper Silesian Committee (which, beginning in January 1919, was called the Union of Upper Silesians).

Kożdoń, along with Richter and Fulda – the leaders of the Delegation of German Parties of East Silesia – wrote "Petition regarding an independent Republic of East Silesia – Cieszyn". During the Paris Peace Conference, this petition was presented by a member of the town council in Bielsko – Robert Piesch – to a member of the Austrian delegation in Paris. The International Commission in Cieszyn had received "Petition regarding the rights of Cieszyn Land’s people to self-determination", whose author, Silesian economist and theoretical lawyer Eduard August Schroeder, supported the independence of Cieszyn Silesia. This option was supported by three members of the International Commission: Dubois from the United States, Tissi from Italy and Coulson from the United Kingdom, but the fourth – Grenard, the representative of France – was opposed to even including independence as an option in the planned plebiscite. The plebiscite was supposed to decide whether Cieszyn Silesia would belong to Poland or Czechoslovakia. Soon the leader of the SPP gained close contacts with leading Czechoslovak politicians: president Tomáš Garrigue Masaryk, prime minister Karel Kramář, foreign affairs minister Edvard Beneš and future prime minister Vlastimil Tusar. They promised Kożdoń that if Silesia lay within the borders of Czechoslovakia it would have political autonomy. Even when the SPP officially supported Czechoslovakia, the party did not abandon the option of independence, which was still advocated by its allies, the Germans of Cieszyn Silesia. Kożdoń cooperated with the leader of the Upper Silesian independence advocates, Ewald Latacz, the chairman of the Union of Upper Silesians, which had about half a million members.

In this period the Szlonzakian movement had a broad base of support. The SPP had more than 10,000 members and the Union of Silesians had 52,000. At this time, the Plebiscite Committee of the Silesian People's Party was founded in Karwina, along with 139 communal plebiscite committees in the counties of Bielsko (50 committees), Cieszyn (61 committees) and Fryštát (28 committees). In the winter of 1920 in Fryštat, František Janku and Paweł Bajtek founded the Silesian Social-Democratic Party, formed from Silesian workers, who were mainly former members of the Polish Socialist Party and the Silesian People's Party from Wisła, Ustroń and Goleszów. Karol Smyczek, Kożdoń's personal secretary, was important in the formation of this new party's local organizations. Taken together, the members and supporters of the Szlonzakian movement numbered about 100,000 in 1920.

In July 1920, the Western allies divided Cieszyn Silesia without holding a plebiscite. On the Polish side, where about 80% of the Szlonzakian movement's organization was located, its activity was prohibited. "Members of the Silesian People’s Party and Union of Silesians were subject to persecution and arrests".

In January 1934, Konrad Markiton, Jan Pokrzyk, Paweł Teda, Alfons Pośpiech, Jerzy Jeleń and Waleska Kubistowa re-formed the Silesian People's Party in Katowice. These people were also members of other Silesian organizations: the Association of Regional Writers, which edited the Trybuna Śląska (Silesian Tribune), the Cultural-Economic Association of Silesia and the Union of Upper Silesian Defence. They connected with the former electors Jan Kustos from the former Prussian Upper Silesia and Józef Kożdoń from the Polish part of Cieszyn Silesia. On 15 April 1934 Polish police confiscated the first issue of the party's bilingual paper, Śląska Straż Ludowa – Schlesische Volkswacht (Silesian People's Watch) and stamped its editorial office. This act marked the end of the organization's activities in Katowice.

=== Union of Upper Silesians ===
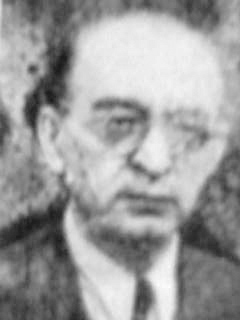
Ewald Latacz, leader of the Union of Upper Silesians

The movement was founded by the Upper Silesian Committee (German: Oberschlesisches Komitee; Polish: Komitet Górnośląski) on 27 November 1918 in Rybnik, Poland by three Catholics: attorney and Wodzisław Śląski Workers Council chairman Ewald Latacz; Thomas Reginek, a priest from Mikulczyce (present-day Zabrze), and educator and Racibórz Workers' and Soldiers' Council chairman Jan Reginek. The Rybnik Upper Silesian Committee demanded an "independent political stance" from Poland, Czechoslovakia and Germany and guaranteed neutrality similar to that in Switzerland and Belgium. The committee had little structure, and no political programme. On 5 December 1918 a German-language brochure, "Oberschlesien – ein Selbständiger Freistaat" ("Upper Silesia – independent/autonomous free state", probably written by Thomas Reginek) was published by the Committee for the Creation of the Upper Silesian Free State in Katowice (German: Komitee zur Vorbereitung eines oberschlesischen Freistaates in Kattowitz). The brochure was an Upper Silesian Committee appeal to Silesians to take the lead in political, economic and social questions and create an independent state similar to Switzerland, where all linguistic groups would have equal rights. Its author predicted that the incorporation of Upper Silesia into Poland would be an economic catastrophe for the region; Upper Silesia would be "a source of income and taxes" for the Polish state, and Silesians would be treated as "second-category citizens" by Polish officials.

A conference of Upper Silesian political parties was organized by German Catholic Centre Party leader Carl Ulitzka and held on 9 December 1918 in Kędzierzyn. Representatives of the Upper Silesian communists (KPOS), the Independent Social Democratic Party of Germany (USPD) and Wojciech Korfanty's Polish party did not attend. At the conference, Upper Silesian Committee chairman Ewald Latacz spoke about the creation of an independent, neutral Upper Silesian State, There was an idea to crown Hans Heinrich XV von Hochberg as the Duke because he was funding the Organization. The attendees formed the Silesian Commission, with the Centre Party's Hans Lukaschek its chairman. The commission implemented the Upper Silesian Committee, with a mandate "to direct and expand the separatist vision in Upper Silesia".

=== Autonomous Silesian Voivodeship (1920–1939) ===
Autonomous Silesian Voivodeship in the Second Polish Republic

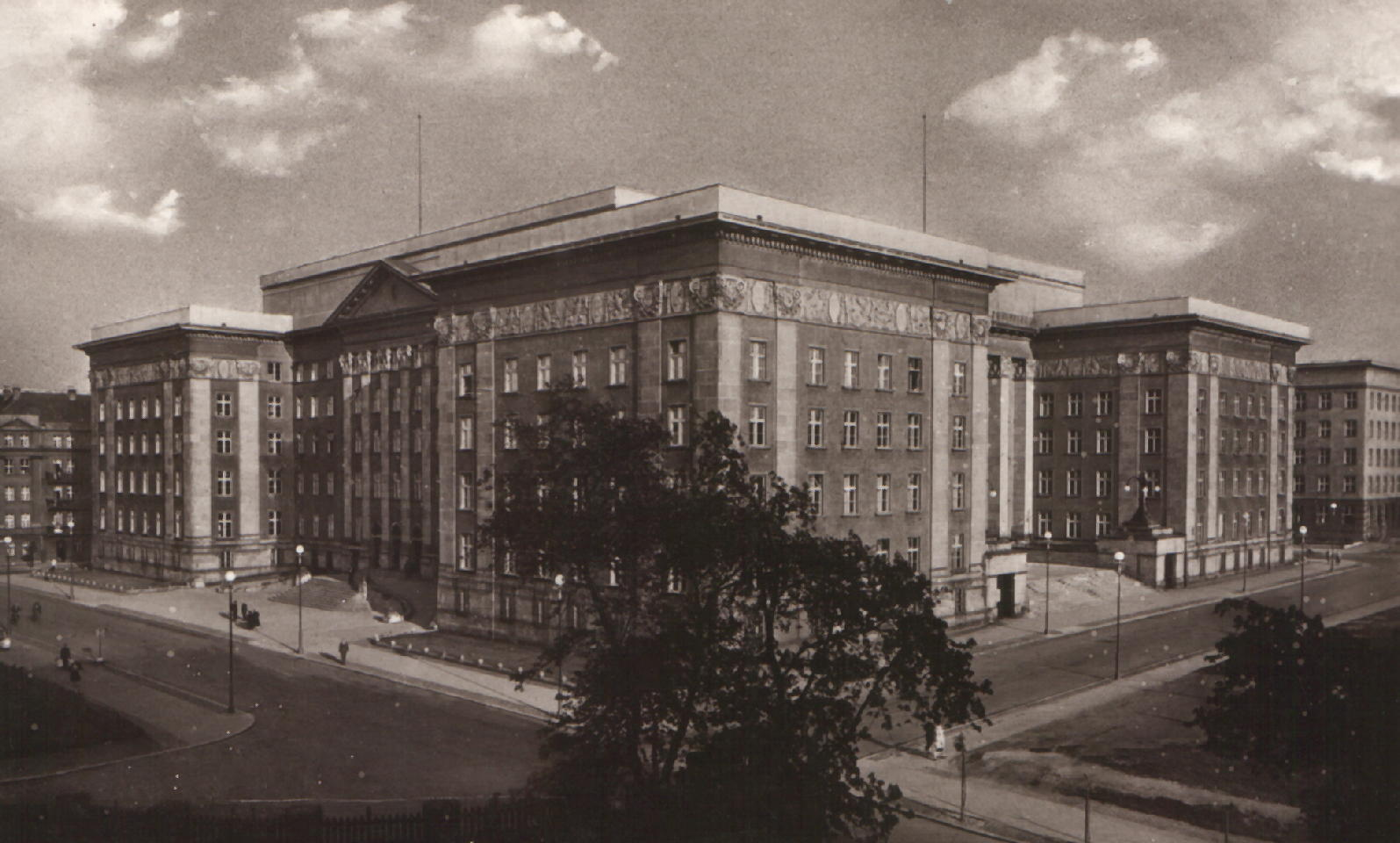
Silesian Parliament in Katowice

After the First World War a dispute arose about the future of Upper Silesia. This part of the Silesia region was the least affected by centuries of Germanisation. The population was predominately Slavic, especially in rural areas. Many of them considered themselves Poles, and some Czechs. The rest did not feel any strong connections to either of those nations; according to Wojciech Korfanty's estimations, this last group represented up to a third of the total whole population of the region.

The Treaty of Versailles resolved that a plebiscite be conducted so that the local population could decide whether Upper Silesia should be assigned to Poland or to Germany. Before the plebiscite took place, two Silesian uprisings supporting the Polish option had broken out. A third uprising occurred after the plebiscite.

Based on the results of the plebiscite, which was held on 20 March 1921, Upper Silesia was divided between Poland and Germany. The Polish part was incorporated as the Silesian Voivodeship. After the referendum of 1921, the German-Polish Accord on East Silesia (Geneva Convention) was concluded on 15 May 1922 and dealt with the constitutional and legal future of Upper Silesia, as part of it had become Polish territory.

After parts of Upper Silesia were annexed to Poland, separatist activity waned. The newly created Silesian Voivodeship became an arena of struggle between German and Polish nationalist movements. There was no room for a third force, and Silesians were forced to take one side or the other; Silesian Voivode Michał Grażyński stated: "we Poles like clear-cut situations and value defined characters. That is why we respect honest Czechs and Germans, but we cannot tolerate any intermediate types". However, the policy of Polonisation was highly unpopular among Upper Silesians, which was reflected in the results of the municipal elections of 19 November 1926, also known as the second Silesian plebiscite. In this election, Silesians voted for German parties in protest, which allowed German parties to win a majority in some districts: in Katowice – 56.7%, in Świętochłowice – 54.3%, and in Królewska Huta (Chorzów) – as much as 70.3%. Upper Silesians voted for German minority parties (the German minority accounted for approximately 7% of the population of the Silesian Voivodeship).

The voivodeship was one of the most economically developed parts of Poland. It had been granted autonomous status by an Act of the Polish Sejm dated 15 July 1920. That status was secure until the May Coup in 1926, which started various attempts to limit it in favour of a strong and centralised state.

In the Second Republic of Poland, Silesian regionalism was particularly encouraged by Governor Michał Grażyński, considered "one of the forerunners of Silesianness". To gain trust of the local population, Grażyński intensively participated in local culture, commissioning Silesian songs and chants, as well as developing the industry of Silesian cinematography, which was in its infancy.

The Silesian people had high hopes for the Silesian Sejm, much higher than for the Sejm of the Republic, seeing it as a body better able to represent them and safeguard their interests. As such, Silesians turned out in much greater numbers at the ballot boxes for the Silesian Sejm than for the Polish Sejm. The turnout during the elections to the Sejm of the Republic reached 64.4% in the voivodeship, while during the elections to the Silesian Sejm it was 73.7%. From the point of view of the social and economic development of the Silesian Voivodeship, the autonomy that the region enjoyed in the interwar period is quite generally assessed positively. The Silesian population's view on autonomy was assessed in a poll conducted by the Silesian daily newspaper "Polonia" in 1937. The poll asked whether Silesian autonomy should be preserved or abolished. The poll was answered by 427,928 readers, and 406,363 (95%) voted in favour of maintaining Silesian autonomy.

After the German invasion of Poland, the voivodeship was dissolved on 8 October 1939, and its territory was incorporated into the German Province of Upper Silesia. The territory returned to Polish possession at the end of the war, and the 1920 act giving autonomous powers to the Silesian Voivodeship was formally repealed by a law of 6 May 1945.

=== Communist Poland ===
As a direct result of the Second World War and the defeat of the Third Reich, Upper Silesia was once again subject to a change of borders, resulting from the Yalta and Potsdam agreements. Poland lost to the USSR, in relation to the borders of the Second Republic of Poland, the lands located east of the Curzon line, receiving in return East Prussia and the lands located east of the Oder and Lusatian Neisse rivers. This drastically affected the situation of the population living in Opole Silesia, which remained within the borders of the German state after the First World War.

After the People's Republic of Poland administration took over the region, it was not possible, according to the official position of the authorities, to maintain further coexistence with the large German minority. As Stanisław Senft noted, "from the very beginning there was a declared desire to de-Germanise the region and remove people not only of foreign, non-Polish nationality, but to erase the traces of the multicultural past of the annexed area". The effects of this were, among others: the process of nationality verification of Silesians and granting Polish citizenship to those who passed it successfully, the mass displacement of the population, the processes of settlement of the Polish population and the political system transformations, consisting in the change of property relations and the nationalisation of the economy.

The communist ideology in Poland after the Second World War also conflicted with the Silesians' traditional attachment to Catholicism. The anti-clericalism of Soviet communism, different forms of acceptable life activity, the hermeticisation of the discourse on the position of Silesians, the policy of national homogenisation, as well as other goals and the obstruction (even for educated Silesians) of social advancement meant that "Polishness ceased to be attractive to Silesians and even became exclusionary". The sense of exclusion was further intensified by negative experiences with the immigrant population showing discriminatory attitudes and the stereotype of "Polnische Wirtschaft" (seeing Polish workers as disorganised, inefficient and lazy) cultivated and perpetuated.

The 1980s brought a radical change in attitudes towards Silesia; the discourse on the national identity of Silesians was gradually liberated. This resulted in a creation of "new regionalism", reviving discussions about the concept of Silesian autonomy and the national or cultural distinctiveness of the region.

=== After 1990 ===
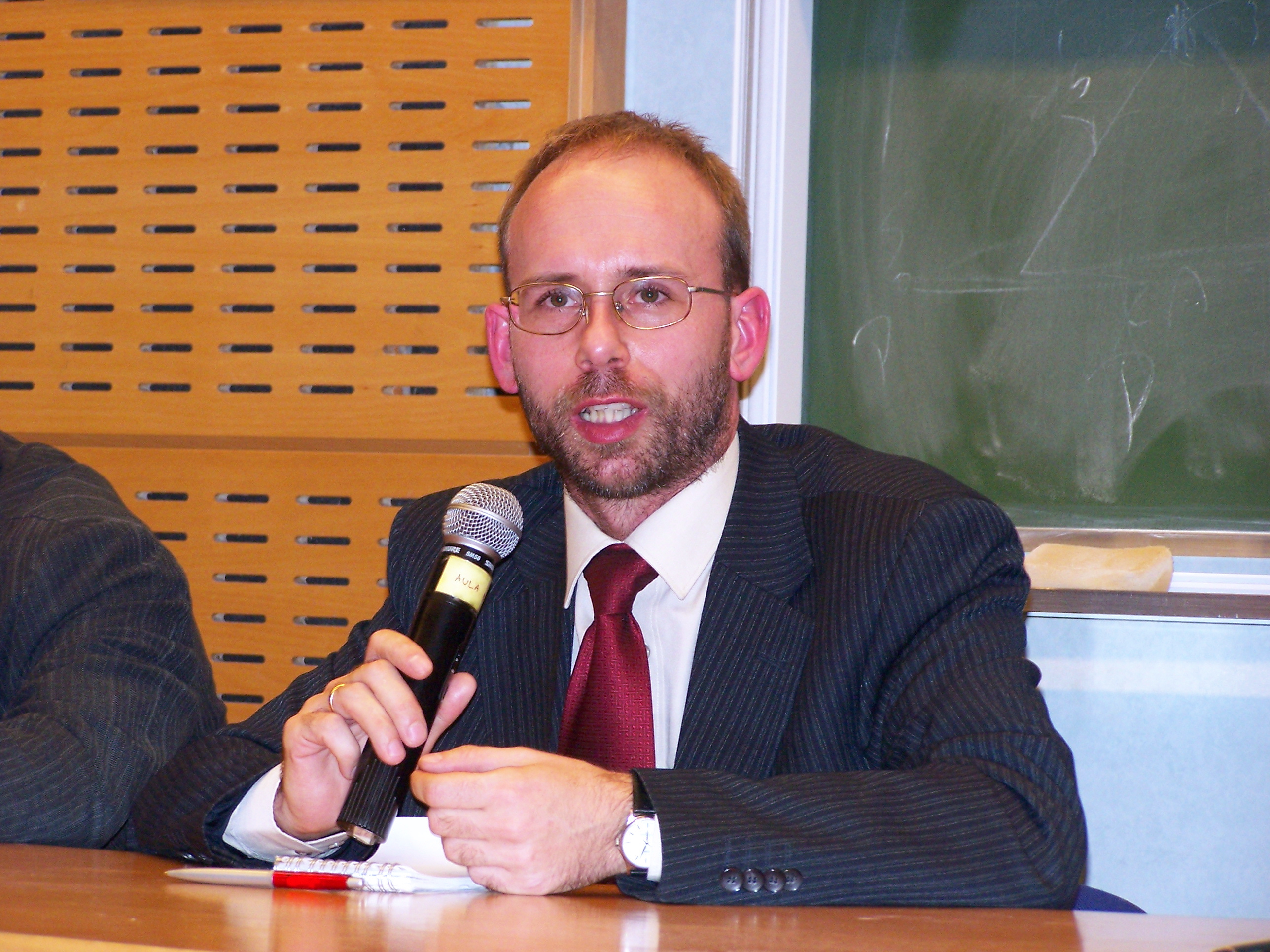
Jerzy Gorzelik, leader of Silesian Autonomy Movement

The Silesian Autonomy Movement (Silesian: Ruch Autōnōmije Ślōnska, RAŚ) was founded in January 1990 by Rudolf Kołodziejczyk and is based in the Polish part of Upper Silesia. RAŚ sees the Silesians as a separate nation rather than primarily as Poles, Germans or Czechs.

The movement participated in the 1991 Polish parliamentary elections and received 40,061 votes (0.36%) and two seats, one of its MPs was Kazimierz Świtoń. Since then, RAŚ has never been represented in the Polish parliament.

Surveys from the 1990s found that between 30 and 60% of Silesians supported Silesian autonomy. In 1991–1993, a survey was carried out on the ethnic identity of rural communities in Lubliniec and Rybnik. The results of the survey revealed a predominance of Silesian ethnic identification (over 70%) and clear sympathies towards the autonomy of Upper Silesia (30%–50%). In a survey conducted in Tychy in 1992, 30% of respondents felt that Silesia should strive for territorial autonomy; approximately 20% had an opposing view, and almost 40% of the respondents evaded answering; the authors of the survey concluded the vast majority of those who refused to answer were supporters of autonomy as well.

In 2002, RAŚ became a member of the European Free Alliance. Since 2007 has organized annual Autonomy Marches in Poland.

In 2000 the Polish Office For State Protection warned in its report that RAŚ may be a potential threat to Poland's interests.

Jerzy Gorzelik, the current leader and representative of the Silesian Autonomy Movement, has claimed numerous times that he is not Polish by nationality but rather "Upper Silesian". He once stated: I'm Silesian, not Polish. My fatherland is Upper Silesia. I did not pledge anything to Poland nor I promised anything to it so it means that I did not betray it. The state called the Republic of Poland, of which I'm a citizen, refused to give me and my friends a right to self-determination and so that's why I do not feel obligated to loyalty towards this country.

In 2010, Gorzelik was elected to the Voivodeship sejmik of Silesian Voivodeship. Upon taking a councillor's seat in the Sejmik, he swore an oath (as is mandatory for every councilor of each Voivodeship Sejmik), and thus automatically pledged loyalty to the Republic of Poland (before Gorzelik was elected, oaths were always sworn collectively in the Sejmik of the Silesian Voivodeship).

Between 2002 and 2011, there was a significant increase in the number of people declaring Silesian national-ethnic identification. This can be traced back to the intensified discussion on Silesian nationality at the time, mostly encouraged by organisations such as the Union of Silesian Nationalities and the Silesian Autonomy Movement. According to Grzegorz Węgrzyn, the sense of own identity and national distinctiveness is emphasised by an increasing proportion of Silesians; Węgrzyn argues that "while declaring national separateness does not automatically imply support for the idea of autonomy for this region, it is quite closely related to it". He also believes that "the idea of autonomy is probably also supported by some inhabitants of the region who did not declare Silesian nationality in the census".

In 2010, controversy sparked over the controversial photo on the official RAŚ site. The photo itself showed a young man who held a trophy in his hand and diploma in the other while behind him was a commemorative plaque with words in German "Zum Gedenken den Gefallenen" (In memory of the fallen), above the plaque was the Iron Cross with dates 1939–1945. On the sides of the commemorative plaque were Silesian and modern Germany flags. When the scandal broke, the Silesian Autonomy Movement has been accused by some of being a "Volksdeutsche organization which real goal is to break the Silesia region from Poland and return it to Germany" and also a "German fifth column in Poland". The photo vanished from the RAŚ site as soon as it was acknowledged in the media.

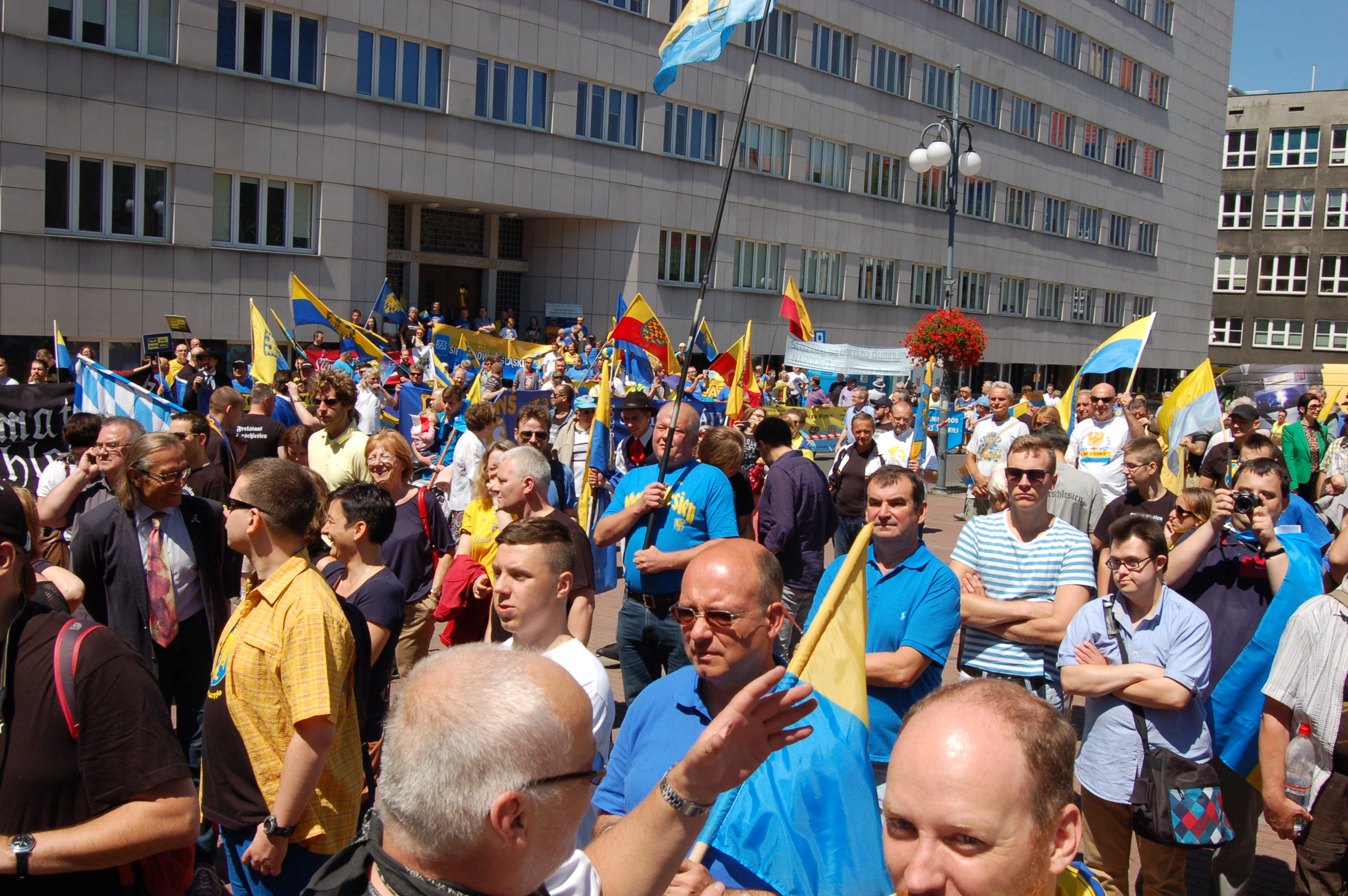
Silesian Autonomy March in 2015

Ryszard Czarnecki, a Polish politician who is a Member of the European Parliament for the Lower Silesian and Opole constituency from Law and Justice, stated on his official Europarliament site that: "On the one hand it proves how contumely and effrontery are Silesian separatists, on the other Polish media can play a positive role only if they want to oppose such iniquity, such defamation of the fallen Poles [who died] from the German hands during the II World War. One must want and can place a dam on this pro-German effrontery."

Silesians Together (Silesian: Ślonzoki Razem) is Silesian regionalist political party in Poland, founded in 2017. The party is not officially in favor of Silesian independence. It believes that the pre-war autonomy of the Silesian Voivodeship should be restored. However, politicians of Silesians Together does not exclude the support of the project of the independent Silesian state in the event that this project is supported by the majority of Silesians.

In 2011, the Silesian Autonomy Movement organized a "pre-referendum" in Lędziny, Imielin and Pszczyna, in which local Silesians were asked the question "Are you in favour of restoring to Upper Silesia the autonomy it had in Poland in the inter-war period?". Amongst 1,700 of people surveyed, 96,4% supported Silesian autonomy.

The modern separatist movement is mainly represented by the radical factions of the Silesian Autonomy Movement as well as the German minority in Poland. Silesian separatists highlight the mixed character of Silesian nation, encompassing speakers of the Slavic Silesian language as well as the Germanic Silesians that speak Silesian German. Silesian magazine Wachtyrz also gives "Silesian Separatist of the Year" award, which is to honor "public persons and institutions whose activities remind Silesians that Silesianness is not Polish after all".

In 2017, German newspaper Die Welt classified Silesia as one of the 11 main centres of separatism in Europe; other 10 centres of separatism were Catalonia, Euskadi, Scotland, Northern Ireland, Donbas, Flanders, Corsica, Sardinia and Lombardy. Polish Catholic magazine Gość Niedzielny compared Silesian separatism to Basque nationalism, stating that both nations have a long history of having a separate identity and culture, and concluded that the Silesian separatist movement has a potential to become as strong as the Basque movement.
