= Silesian People's Party =

Former political party in Silesia

Silesian People's Party Ślōnskŏ Ludowŏ Partyjŏ
- Polish name: Śląska Partia Ludowa
- Czech name: Slezská lidová strana
- German name: Schlesische Volkspartei
- Leader: Józef Kożdoń
- Founded: 1908
- Dissolved: 1938
- Ideology: Silesian independence (after 1918); Silesian nationalism Secularism; Economic liberalism

The Silesian People’s Party (Silesian: Ślōnskŏ Ludowŏ Partyjŏ, Polish: Śląska Partia Ludowa, Czech: Slezská lidová strana, German: Schlesische Volkspartei) was a political organization in Cieszyn Silesia that existed from 1909 to 1938 in Austrian Silesia, which later became international plebiscite territory and finally part of Czechoslovakia. The party included mainly Slavic people, who saw themselves as members of a Silesian nation. The party is seen as part of the Szlonzakian movement (Polish: ruch ślązakowski, Czech: Šlonzácké hnutí, German: Schlonsakenbewegung) or Silesian Separatist Movement.

== History ==
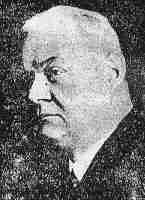
Józef Kożdoń

The Silesian People's Party was founded in summer of 1908 by the principal of an elementary school, Józef Kożdoń, in Skoczów. On 7 February 1909, the party counted about 2,000 members in 30 local groups in the counties of Bielsko, Cieszyn and Fryštát. Local groups in Frydek county formed later. Members and electors of the SPP came from Protestant circles among the citizens of Cieszyn Silesia, so the largest organizations within the party existed in Bielsko and Cieszyn, where large Protestant communities lived. The party's largest local groups, as of 1913, existed in Skoczów (214 members) and Cieszyn (210 members).

The goals of the SPP were not new – similar sentiments had been present in Cieszyn Silesia since the Revolutions of 1848 – but this was the first time that supporters of Silesian independence were organized into a distinct political party. Silesian nationalist positions were first advocated by the Union of Austrian Silesians, which was founded in 1848 by Silesian deputies of the Austrian Parliament: Franz Hein, Hans Kudlich and Johann Demel von Elswehr. Such sentiments were also voiced informally by community institutions, like the paper Nowy Czas (New Time), edited by preacher Theodor Haase. "The Szlonzakian movement had expanded in the nineties of the 19th century, collecting Slavic people who didn’t want to vote for Poles or Czechs and chose attachment to a separate Silesian nation". Silesian nationalism achieved successes mainly in the judicial districts of Skoczów, Strumień and Frydek.

== Activity in Austria ==
In 1909 there were elections to the Silesian Parliament in Opava. The Silesian People's Party and German liberals had established a united election list, the Silesian Progressive Coalition, which included SPP candidates in rural electoral districts and German liberal candidates in urban electoral districts. Finally electors from the rural Bielsko-Strumień-Skoczów electoral district chose one deputy – the leader of Silesian People’s Party, Józef Kożdoń, who defeated Józef Londzin from the Union of Silesian Catholics, who was leader of the Poles in Cieszyn Silesia. In the rural Cieszyn-Fryštát-Jablunkov electoral district, Fraciszek Halfar of the Union of Silesian Catholics won with support from the SPP and Polish parties as well. The second deputy from this circle, Jan Michejda, defeated the SPP candidate, Josef Cichy, thanks to the votes of Polish Catholics and Czechs. Michejda became leader of the Protestant Polish National Party. The third SPP candidate, Edward Quasnitza, won the first round of elections in the rural Bohumín-Slezská Ostrava-Frýdek electoral district, but in the second round he was defeated by the Czech candidate Jan Poppe, mayor of Slezská Ostrava, who was supported by the Poles.

In July 1910, the non-political cultural base of Silesian People's Party was formed: the Union of Silesians (Polish: Związek Ślązaków, German: Bund der Schlesier, Czech: Svaz Slezanů), founded by Kożdoń, Cichy, and Paul Wania, originally under the name Silesian People's Union "Our Homeland" (Polish: Śląski Związek Ludowy "Nasza Ojczyzna", German: Schlesischer Volksverband "Unsere Heimat"). From 1909 to 1923 the official paper of the Silesian People's Party was the weekly Ślązak (Silesian).

In 1911 there were local elections in Austria. The SPP won in 39 municipalities of the counties of Bielsko and Cieszyn: Jaworze and Jasienica in the judicial district of Bielsko; Bładnice Dolne, Cisownica, Goleszów, Godziszów, Górki Wielkie, Harbutowice, Hermanice, Kozakowice Górne, Kozakowice Dolne, Łączka, Międzyświeć, Nierodzim, Simoradz, Wieszczęta, Wilamowice and Ustroń (here with a coalition of Szlonzakians and Germans) in the judicial district of Skoczów; Bąków, Drogomyśl, Pruchna, Zaborze and Rudzica (here with a coalition of Szlonzakians and Poles) in the judicial district of Strumień; Bażanowice, Dzięgielów, Gumna, Konská, Leszna Górna, Komorní Lhotka, Nebory, Puńców, Svibice, Zamarski, Horní Žukov and Šumbark (here with a coalition of Szlonzakians and Poles) in the judicial district of Cieszyn; Lyžbice, Mosty u Jablunkova and Oldřichovice in the judicial district of Jablunkov.

In 1911 there were also elections to the Austrian Parliament in Vienna. SPP candidates lost many socialist votes and were defeated by Polish and Czech candidates. Kożdoń did not even win in majority municipalities that his party had ruled in local elections. Eight municipalities around Bielsko, called a "German language island", which had voted for Kożdoń in the Silesian Parliament elections in 1909, constituted an exception within the rural Bielsko electoral district. Kożdoń won 26% of the votes in the Bielsko electoral district and 19% of the votes in the Cieszyn electoral district. Louis Schindler took 7.5% votes in the Frydek electoral district.

In the period when Cieszyn Silesia belonged to Austria-Hungary, the Silesian People's Party reached the largest popularity in the triangle between Cieszyn, Wisła and Strumień, centering on Skoczów, Jaworze, Ustroń and Goleszów.

== In the plebiscite period ==
After World War I members of Silesian People's Party hoped to get Austrian Silesia a place as a free state in the federation of Austrian states. When this effort failed, they pushed for the independence of Cieszyn Silesia and probably a union with the formerly Prussian Upper Silesia. Upper Silesia's independence was advocated by the Upper Silesian Committee (which, beginning in January 1919, was called the Union of Upper Silesians).

Kożdoń, along with Richter and Fulda – the leaders of the Delegation of German Parties of East Silesia – wrote "Petition regarding an independent Republic of East Silesia – Cieszyn". During the Paris Peace Conference, this petition was presented by a member of the town council in Bielsko – Robert Piesch – to a member of the Austrian delegation in Paris. The International Commission in Cieszyn had received "Petition regarding the rights of Cieszyn Land’s people to self-determination", whose author, Silesian economist and theoretical lawyer Eduard August Schroeder, supported the independence of Cieszyn Silesia. This option was supported by three members of the International Commission: Dubois from the United States, Tissi from Italy and Coulson from the United Kingdom, but the fourth – Grenard, the representative of France – was opposed to even including independence as an option in the planned plebiscite. The plebiscite was supposed to decide whether Cieszyn Silesia would belong to Poland or Czechoslovakia. Soon the leader of the SPP gained close contacts with leading Czechoslovak politicians: president Tomáš Garrigue Masaryk, prime minister Karel Kramář, foreign affairs minister Edvard Beneš and future prime minister Vlastimil Tusar. They promised Kożdoń that if Silesia lay within the borders of Czechoslovakia it would have political autonomy.

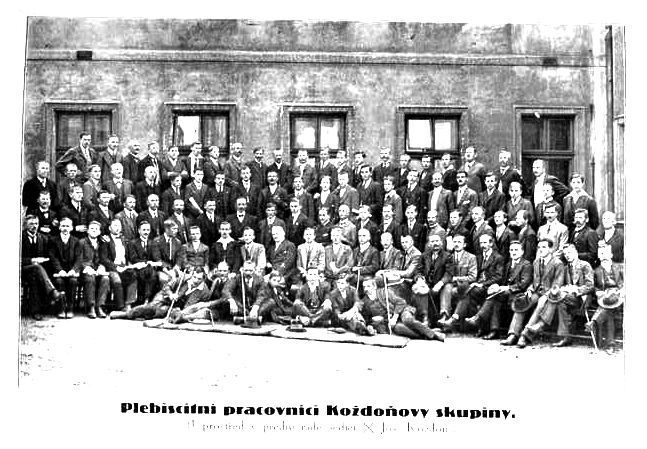
Workers of the plebiscite committee of the Silesian People’s Party. Józef Kożdoń is marked with a white "X".

Even when the SPP officially supported Czechoslovakia, the party did not abandon the option of independence, which was still advocated by its allies, the Germans of Cieszyn Silesia. Kożdoń cooperated with the leader of the Upper Silesian independence advocates, Ewald Latacz, the chairman of the Union of Upper Silesians, which had about half a million members.

In this period the Szlonzakian movement had a broad base of support. The SPP had more than 10,000 members and the Union of Silesians had 52,000. At this time, the Plebiscite Committee of the Silesian People's Party was founded in Karwina, along with 139 communal plebiscite committees in the counties of Bielsko (50 committees), Cieszyn (61 committees) and Fryštát (28 committees). In the winter of 1920 in Fryštat, František Janku and Paweł Bajtek founded the Silesian Social-Democratic Party, formed from Silesian workers, who were mainly former members of the Polish Socialist Party and the Silesian People's Party from Wisła, Ustroń and Goleszów. Karol Smyczek, Kożdoń’s personal secretary, was important in the formation of this new party's local organizations. Taken together, the members and supporters of the Szlonzakian movement numbered about 100,000 in 1920.

In July 1920, the Western allies divided Cieszyn Silesia without holding a plebiscite.

== In Poland ==
On the Polish side, where about 80% of the Szlonzakian movement's organization was located, its activity was prohibited. Members of the Silesian People’s Party and Union of Silesians were subject to persecution and arrests.

In January 1934, Konrad Markiton, Jan Pokrzyk, Paweł Teda, Alfons Pośpiech, Jerzy Jeleń and Waleska Kubistowa re-formed the Silesian People's Party in Katowice. These people were also members of other Silesian organizations: the Association of Regional Writers, which edited the Trybuna Śląska (Silesian Tribune), the Cultural-Economic Association of Silesia and the Union of Upper Silesian Defence. They connected with the former electors Jan Kustos from the former Prussian Upper Silesia and Józef Kożdoń from the Polish part of Cieszyn Silesia. On 15 April 1934 Polish police confiscated the first issue of the party's bilingual paper, Śląska Straż Ludowa – Schlesische Volkswacht (Silesian People’s Watch) and stamped its editorial office. This act marked the end of the organization's activities in Katowice.

== Activity in Czechoslovakia ==
In 1923 there was a schism in the Silesian People's Party. Three factions appeared: one German-speaking (including Rudolf Francus, Walter Harbich, Karol Sikora, Arthur Wohrizek, Emmanuel Harbich, Otto Wohlman, Karl Kordula and Hans Peschke); a second Polish-speaking (including Karol Folwartschny, Gustaw Wałach, Józef Santarius, Adam Broda and Paweł Tomanek); and a third pro-Czech (including Karol Smyczek, Karol Pawlas and Alfred Farnik). The German-language faction started in some communal and all-district elections in a coalition with the German-minority election community. The Polish-language faction formed election coalitions with Polish minority parties. Kożdoń, as leader of all the party, linked these two factions. In some communes he stood for election alone. The pro-Czech faction cut ties with Kożdoń and became a separate organization, closely affiliated with the Republican Party of Agricultural and Smallholder People. In communal elections it stood for election alone or entered Czech coalitions.

Sometimes in one commune started all three factions of the SPP, which competed among themselves. In communal elections the SPP gained various success. Its two candidates (Rudolf Francus and Karol Sikora) were members in the Český Těšín county council, and the number of its members in the town council of Český Těšín was still expanding (five in 1923, ten in 1927, twelve in 1931), and from 1923 to 1928, Kożdoń served four terms as mayor of Český Těšín. The SPP dominated the commune of Svibice too, and it had a large number of communal council members, starting in various political configurations (alone as the Silesian People's Party, in a separate Polish-language faction, in a separate German-language faction, in a broad German and Polish coalition, and in various communal and citizens committees).

The newspaper of the Polish-language faction was Nasz Lud (Our People). "Ślązak w Czechosłowacji" (Silesian in Czechoslovakia) and Nasz Ślązak (Our Silesian) were the pro-Czech papers. The Czechs founded the organization Czech-Szlonzakian Unity (Česko-šlonzacká jednota), which incorporated weak SPP organizations in Frydek county and connected it to the Czech political camp. The leading members of the Silesian People's Party in Czechoslovakia were: Józef Kożdoń, Rudolf Pierniczek, Karol Malina, Rudolf Francus, Walter Harbich in Český Těšín, Ludwik Niedoba i Alojzy Kuchejda in Jablunkov, Oswald Bayer in Třinec, Gustaw Wałach in Orlová, Robert Wallach in Komorní Lhotka, Karol Sikora and Jan Pasterny in Šumbark, Karol Kubik in Lyžbice, Bruno Kappel in Třanovice, Karol Bruck in Svibice and Józef Pellar in Bystrzyca.

In the 1925 parliamentary elections in Czechoslovakia, the SPP formed a coalition with the Polish minority parties: the Union of Silesian Catholics, the Polish People's Party and the Polish Socialist Workers Party. Gustaw Wałach, a member of the Szlonzakian movement, took third place, after Leon Wolf from the Union of Silesian Catholics and Wiesław Wójcik from the Polish Socialist Workers Party. The election slogan of the Polish coalition was "Silesia for Silesians", which was originally an SPP slogan that all Polish organizations had opposed in the Austrian period. Leon Wolf was elected deputy.

In 1927 the Czechoslovak authorities, against their own guarantees to the SPP, decided to connect Czech Silesia with Moravia. In response the mayor of Opava, Ernst Franz, founded the Committee for the Protection of Silesian Rights, which opposed this decision. The committee produced a German-language brochure by Kożdoń, "Right of our Silesian homeland for administration unhabitance", in which he argued that the merging of Czech Silesia with Moravia was irrational, based on historical, social and economic issues. The SPP, the Union of Silesians and all the organizations of Polish and German minorities protested the decision, but authorities in Prague ignored them.

In the 1928 elections to the Silesia–Moravia regional assembly, the SPP formed a coalition with the Poles again. A Szlonzakian–Polish–Jewish election list included Gustaw Wałach from the SPP, but nobody from this list was elected.

In the National Assembly elections in 1929 and the elections to Silesian-Moravian Regional Assembly in 1935, the SPP supported the Polish-Jewish list. In the National Assembly elections of 1935, the SPP supported Polish candidate Karol Junga from a Polish-Slovak-Ruthenian list, the Autonomy Bloc. On the other hand, Walter Harbich, leader of the German-language faction, supported Sudetendeutsche Partei.

In 1938 Nazi Germany, claimed the Opava Silesia and other Czechoslovak territories inhabited by ethnic German majorities. Poland claimed the Trans-Olza region. In this situation, on 8 September 1938, the Silesian People's Party, as "representative of the Silesian nationality", sent a message to the representative of the United Kingdom, Sir Walter Runciman, thait reminded him of the question of the plebiscite in 1920. In the new emergency, the SPP demanded four allied powers to execute a plebiscite regarding the future of Cieszyn Silesia. The petition, to which was attached Kurt Witt's work "Die Teschener Frage" ("The Cieszyn question"), was signed by Kożdoń as mayor of Český Těšín, along with Bruno Kappel, Karol Kubik, Robert Wallach, Walter Harbich and Český Těšín county council member Rudolf Francus. On 18 September 1938 Walter Harbich as leader of the "assembly of the Silesian nationality" sent a telegram to Adolf Hitler, requesting the independence of Cieszyn Silesia under the protection of Nazi Germany. Another petition about the issue was sent to the British prime minister, Neville Chamberlain.

== Decline ==
On 2 October 1938 Polish Army incorporated Trans-Olza into Poland, and eventually the Wehrmacht incorporated Silesian territory near Opava and other territories into Nazi Germany. On 2 October 1938 Rudolf Francus and Walter Harbich, the leaders of the German-language faction of the Silesian People's Party sent a telegram to Adolf Hitler, speaking for the Silesian people and German people from Bohumín in protest of the cession of the Trans-Olza to Poland. All the telegrams were sent without Kożdoń's knowledge. On 6 October 1938 Polish authorities banned all non-Polish organizations in Trans-Olza. German and Czechoslovak organizations were banned, as well as the Silesian People's Party and the Union of Silesians. Kożdoń was deposed as mayor of Český Těšín and authorities forced him to leave Cieszyn Silesia and go to Opava. At this time, Walter Harbich, in cooperation with Paul Lamatsch but without Kożdoń's knowledge, subordinated the illegal Silesian People's Party to the Volksdeutsche Mittelstelle ("Central office of ethnic Germans living abroad") in Berlin.

Two weeks after the invasion of Poland by Germany, Kożdoń "was welcomed by ovation" back to Cieszyn. In December 1939, Nazi Germans organized a police census, in which 157,000 citizens of Cieszyn Silesia declared themselves members of the "Szlonzakian nationality" (Volk der Schlonsaken) and 184,000 declared Szlonzakian (Schlonsakisch) to be their native language. The Germans did not legalise the activities of the Silesian People's Party or reinstate Kożdoń as mayor. The Germans used the immense popularity of party's ideals for the purpose of Germanization.

== See also ==
- Józef Kożdoń
- Josef Cichy
- Ewald Latacz
- Joseph Musiol
- Union of Upper Silesians
- Jan Kustos
- Theofil Kupka
- Silesian Autonomy Movement

== Sources ==
- Tomasz Kamusella, Silesia and Central European Nationalisms: The Emergence of National and Ethnic Groups in Prussian Silesia and Austrian Silesia, 1848–1918 (Ser: Central European Studies; foreword by Professor Charles W. Ingrao). 2007. West Lafayette, IN: Purdue University Press, 386 pp. ISBN 978-1-55753-371-5
- Upper Silesia 1870–1920: Between Region, Religion, Nation and Ethnicity: journal article by Tomasz Kamusella; East European Quarterly, Vol. 38, 2004
- Dariusz Jerczyński, Historia Narodu Śląskiego (History of Silesian Nation), second edition (implemented and corrected), Zabrze 2006, ISBN 978-83-60540-55-8.
