= Jan Kustos =

Silesian politician, philosophy magister and press editor (1893-1932)

Jan Kustos (5 September 1893 in Syrynia, Wodzisław Śląski – 28 July 1932 in Katowice) was a Silesian politician, philosophy magister, press editor, founder and chairman of the Union of Upper Silesians Defence from 1925-1932, spokesman rights national minority for Silesians in Poland, member of town council in Katowice in the period 1926-1927, founder of the Trade Union of Upper Silesians in 1927, and a representative of Silesian nationality in the time of conversation with representative League of Nations in 1929.

== See also ==
- Union of Upper Silesians
- Ewald Latacz
- Joseph Musiol
- Silesian People's Party
- Józef Kożdoń
- Theofil Kupka
- Silesian Autonomy Movement

== Sources ==
- Piotr Dobrowolski, Ugrupowania i kierunki separatystyczne na Górnym Śląsku i w Cieszyńskiem w latach 1918-1939, Warszawa – Kraków 1972.
- Dariusz Jerczyński, Historia Narodu Śląskiego. (History of Silesian Nation), second edition (implemented and corrected), Zabrze 2006.
- Guido Hitze, Carl Ulitzka (1873-1953) oder Oberschlesien zwischen den Weltkriegen, Düsseldorf 2002.
