= Josef Cichy =

Silesian politician

Josef Cichy (Polish: Józef Cichy)(1852–1913 in Cieszyn) was a Silesian politician. He owned a limestone furnace company in Goleszów. He was one of the first officials of the Silesian People's Party and ran as the party's candidate in an election to the Silesian Parliament in Opava, from the election district of Frysztat-Cieszyn-Jabłonków. He served as the leader of the local branch of the Silesian People's Party in Cieszyn. He was also a co-founder (in 1910) and chairman (from 1911) of the Union of Silesians. In 1911, he became the president of Head Authority of Election Committee for Józef Kożdoń, the chairman Buy and Sale Company for East Silesia.

== Sources ==
- Dariusz Jerczyński, Orędownicy niepodległości Śląska, Zabrze 2005 ISBN 83-919589-4-9 pages 219-220.

== See also ==
- Józef Kożdoń
- Silesian People's Party
- Ewald Latacz
- Joseph Musiol
- Union of Upper Silesians
- Theofil Kupka
