= Union of Upper Silesians =

20th-century European independence movement

Union of Upper Silesians Ferajn Gōrnoślōnzŏkōw
- Leader: Ewald Latacz
- Founder: Ewald Latacz and Joseph Musiol
- Founded: 27 November 1918
- Dissolved: 1924
- Succeeded by: Silesian Autonomy Movement (claimed)
- Headquarters: Bytom
- Newspaper: Der Bund – Związek
- Ideology: Silesian Separatism Regionalism; Federalism; Political Neutrality; Factions: Hochbergism: Monarchism; Silesian Tradtitonalism; Silesian nationalism; Kożdonism: Silesian nationalism; Secularism; Economic liberalism
- Slogan: "Silesians demand a Free State"

Party flag

The Union of Upper Silesians (German: Bund der Oberschlesier; Polish: Związek Górnoślązaków; Silesian: Ferajn Gůrnoślůnzokůw) was an early 20th-century movement for the independence of Upper Silesia. The movement had its genesis during the revolutions of 1848. Allied with the Silesian People's Party, it dissolved in 1924 but has influenced the present-day Silesian Autonomy Movement.

== Origins ==
The movement was founded by the Upper Silesian Committee (German: Oberschlesisches Komitee; Polish: Komitet Górnośląski) on 27 November 1918 in Rybnik, Poland by three Catholics: attorney and Wodzisław Śląski Workers Council chairman Ewald Latacz; Thomas Reginek, a priest from Mikulczyce (present-day Zabrze), and educator and Racibórz Workers' and Soldiers' Council chairman Jan Reginek. The Rybnik Upper Silesian Committee demanded an "independent political stance" from Poland, Czechoslovakia and Germany and guaranteed neutrality similar to that in Switzerland and Belgium. The committee had little structure, and no political programme. On 5 December 1918 a German-language brochure, "Oberschlesien – ein Selbständiger Freistaat" ("Upper Silesia – independent/autonomous free state", probably written by Thomas Reginek) was published by the Committee for the Creation of the Upper Silesian Free State in Katowice (German: Komitee zur Vorbereitung eines oberschlesischen Freistaates in Kattowitz). The brochure was an Upper Silesian Committee appeal to Silesians to take the lead in political, economic and social questions and create an independent state similar to Switzerland, where all linguistic groups would have equal rights. Its author predicted that the incorporation of Upper Silesia into Poland would be an economic catastrophe for the region; Upper Silesia would be "a source of income and taxes" for the Polish state, and Silesians would be treated as "second-category citizens" by Polish officials.

=== Kędzierzyn conference ===
A conference of Upper Silesian political parties was organized by German Catholic Centre Party leader Carl Ulitzka and held on 9 December 1918 in Kędzierzyn. Representatives of the Upper Silesian communists (KPOS), the Independent Social Democratic Party of Germany (USPD) and Wojciech Korfanty's Polish party did not attend. At the conference, Upper Silesian Committee chairman Ewald Latacz spoke about the creation of an independent, neutral Upper Silesian Free State, it was proposed to crown Hans Heinrich XV von Hochberg as the Duke of Upper Silesia because he was funding and diplomatically supporting the Organization. The attendees formed the Silesian Commission, with the Centre Party's Hans Lukaschek its chairman. The commission implemented the Upper Silesian Committee, with a mandate "to direct and expand the separatist vision in Upper Silesia".

=== Negotiations with neighbours ===
In December, leaders of the Upper Silesian Committee (Górnośląskiego) travelled to Czechoslovakia, Poland and Germany to sound out the countries' positions on Upper Silesian independence. Only in Prague did officials inform Upper Silesian Committee representatives Ewald Latacz, Thomas Reginek, Jan Reginek and Fritz Wenske that the Western allies would consider the creation of an independent Upper Silesian state. Jan Reginek, representative of the Upper Silesian councils, requested recognition for the new status in Berlin. However, only two politicians (Hugo Haase and Helmuth von Gerlach) favoured independence for Upper Silesia. Thomas Reginek went to Poznań, the seat of the Polish People's Council, where he failed to persuade Kazimierz Czapla (the Upper Silesian representative in Poland) to support Upper Silesian independence. Another unsuccessful attempt to persuade the Germans was made by Thomas Reginek, Ewald Latacz and a representative of Upper Silesian industrialists.

On 19–20 December 1918 the Upper Silesian Committee published a bilingual brochure, "Appeal for the Creation of an Upper Silesian Free State", as a supplement in two popular Catholic Centre Party newspapers. There were 294 editions of Oberschlesischer Kurier published in Chorzów and 293 editions of Oberschlesische Zeitung published in Bytom, edited by brothers. On 19 December 1920 the Poles broke up a meeting in Rubnik which had been organised by Ewald Latacz with the agenda, "Upper Silesia for Upper Silesians". Organisers of the meeting were beaten, and the Poles described it as "propaganda".

== Activity ==
The political belief that Silesians should be a separate nation was not new in Prussian Upper Silesia; it dated back to the revolutions of 1848. In April 1849 painter and poet Jan Gajda published an appeal "to the Upper Silesian people" in the Polish-language newspaper Dziennik Górnośląski (Upper Silesian Journal) that the time had come when Silesians would count "to enlightened nations", supporting the creation of a Silesian League "to support Silesian nationality". At meetings organised by Józef Szafranek were chants of "Long live Silesian nationality", and calls were made to unite Prussian Upper Silesia and Austrian Silesia. These aspirations were also held by the Silesian People's Party in Cieszyn Silesia in 1909.

According to a 31 December 1918 decree by the president of the Regency of Opole, supporters of an independent Upper Silesian republic were guilty of high treason; Section 96 of the act forbade public meetings about Upper Silesian independence. German authorities suspended the activity of the Union of Upper Silesians, arresting its leaders. Latacz and Jan Reginek became political prisoners, and Joseph Musiol was granted immunity by the Prussian parliament. Thomas Reginek escaped to Paris via Berlin and Poznań with a Polish passport; there, the leader of the Polish National Party informed him that France supported Polish opposition to Upper Silesian independence.

Latacz, thanks to his broad connections to German politicians in Upper Silesia, was released on probation in spring 1919 and forbidden any "verbal and written" support of Upper Silesian independence. Against this prohibition, the leader of the Upper Silesians, published the anonime edited German-language brochure Oberschlesien auf Subhasta!, in which it premised the shrinking German majority at the time a plebiscite and showed the need for the creation of an independent Upper Silesian state with the argument that Upper Silesian nation is homogeneous people about mixed blood.

In spring 1919, after negotiations in Paris, London and Rome, Upper Silesian Catholic People's Party (Katholische Volkspartei) chairman Carl Ulitzka rejected Upper Silesian independence as a "utopia impossible to realise". Ulitzka began a campaign to incorporate Prussian Upper Silesia into Germany, demanding its exclusion from Prussia and its establishment as a free state of Germany (such as Bavaria). He was supported by four members of the Catholic People's Party and opposed by Joseph Musiol and Heinrich Skowronek.

=== Western allies ===
In the final conditions of the Paris Peace Conference for the German delegation on 16 June 1919, the Western allies assigned southern Racibórz county to Czechoslovakia. In summer 1919, the Union of Upper Silesians sent a petition to the Paris Peace Conference criticising the treaty for its limitations on Upper Silesian plebiscite options to Poland and Germany. In the name of "many hundred thousands of Upper Silesians", the union demanded to change article 88 of the treaty so an Upper Silesian plebiscite would have the "option of [a] neutral free state". According to the petition, "Upper Silesian nation, in majority with oneself, indivisibility and independence of Upper Silesia". In late 1919 the United States, influenced by the Goodyear Tire and Rubber Company, organised the creation of a "coal and steel state" under international protection which included the Upper Silesian Industrial Circle (Oberschlesische Industriebezirk) and the Ostrava-Karviná basin in the former Austrian Silesia. Because of French opposition, the United States withdrew from supporting a Silesian state. In fall 1919 the Reginek brothers accepted autonomy for Silesian lands which would be included into Poland, left the Union of Upper Silesians and joined the Polish Plebiscite Commission. At the time the chairman of the Union of Upper Silesians was Ewald Latacz, assisted by Joseph Musiol.

=== Silesian People's Party ===
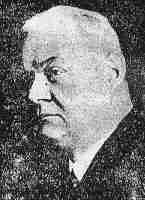
Józef Kożdoń in 1923

In the winter of 1920 Latacz went to Cieszyn to attend a meeting of the Silesian People's Party and delegates from German parties to create an independent Silesian state, or autonomy in Czechoslovakia. Because of the Slavic-Germanic Silesian people and a similar industrial structure in Cieszyn Silesia, its demands to unite with Prussian Upper Silesia encouraged Latacz to hope for an economically strong, united Silesian state similar to Belgium. At the meeting, Silesian People's Party chairman Józef Kożdoń advised the chairman of the Union of Upper Silesians. On 17 March 1920 editor Georg Cibis in Bytom began publishing the bilingual Ślązak (Silesian), the Silesian People's Party newspaper. Der Bund – Związek was sympathetic to the Silesian People's Party. The article "Free Upper Silesian state, the midpoint of all world policy" said, "The Upper Silesian people in large majority demand independence and indivisibility of their own country and connection with brothers in Austrian Silesia separated from it over 150 years ago ... The Upper Silesian people are strongly connected for hundreds of years by culture, employment and Slavic-Germanic blood ... almost three million souls, of whom 600,000 are in Austria".

=== Freedom fighters ===
On 18 August 1920, 68 member of the Union of Upper Silesians (Związku Górnoślązaków-Bund der Oberschlesier) met at its headquarters in Bytom. In attendance were chairman Joseph Musiol from Bytom, secretary Hugo Kotulla from Tarnowskie Góry and two aldermen, one from Bytom and one from Mikulczyce. On 17 November 1920, 300 representatives of 175 local groups of the Union of Upper Silesia (representing about 300,000 members) met in Bytom. The conference was led by Latacz, from Wodzisław Śląski; Joseph Musiol from Bytom; Wiktor Durynek from Tarnowskie Góry, and Hubert Kraft (Count Strachwitz) from Lądek-Zdrój. The Upper Silesian national symbol and the national emblem of the Upper Silesian State was agreed as the coat of arms of the Upper Silesian line of the Piast dynasty: a golden eagle on a blue shield. This became part of the headlines of the weekly bilingual newspaper Der Bund – Związek, with a circulation of 20,000 copies in 1920, 40,000 copies in winter 1921 and several hundred thousand copies in 1921. The union was the most influential Silesian organisation of its time; in February 1921, it had 198 local chapters with 400,000 members. In the fall of 1920 editor Georg Cibis moved from the Union of Upper Silesians to the German Plebiscite Commission, succeeded at Der Bund – Związek by Wiktor Durynek.

=== After the plebiscite ===
In the 20 March 1921 plebiscite, Germany won with 59.6 per cent of the vote. Ewald Latacz published an appeal: "Upper Silesians!! Upper Silesia stay undivided! ... Who wants to chop our country to pieces to inherit something from us. But we want to live; we Polish- and German-speaking Upper Silesians want to live together in peace and lead our country to prosperity. This is possible only when Upper Silesia is undivided. We demand a plebiscite on whether Upper Silesia will be divided or not ... Korfanty says that he will defend it to his last drop of blood. Upper Silesians, we warn you. You don't change your homeland in a desert. If there is bloodshed, it will not be Upper Silesian blood and not in Upper Silesia. Upper Silesians don't resort to terrorist acts; terrorism must be nipped in the bud. Upper Silesians, remember that we are a homogeneous, fraternal nation. Let's shake hands with ourselves, let's live in a peaceful, free and undivided Upper Silesia ... and celebrate our resurrection as free citizens in the Upper Silesian State".

On 2 May 1921 the third Polish uprising, a bloody civil war, erupted. Leaders of the uprising demanded the "proclamation of a sovereign Silesian state" from Wojciech Korfanty, which he rejected. Upper Silesia was divided, which was advantageous for Poland. In the weekly Der Bund – Związek appeared in bold type, "Every Upper Silesian is an open or secret member of the Union of Upper Silesians". According to the union, in fall 1921 it numbered about 500,000 members.

In April 1921 Joseph Musiol, Heinrich Skowronek and Wiktor Durynek demanded independence for Upper Silesia, and Adam Napieralski negotiated on behalf of Poland. Ewald Latacz met with German Interior Minister Georg Gradnauer and Chancellor Joseph Wirth on 4 September 1921.

=== End of activity ===
In November 1921, Wiktor Durynek resigned as editor of Der Bund – Związek and retired from political activity. He was succeeded by Joseph Musiol and architect Bruno Petzel, a former member of the Polish People's Council. On 4 December 1921 Ewald Latacz resigned from the Union of Upper Silesians and retired from politics at the organisation's meeting in Chorzów, and was succeeded by Musiol. Upper Silesian industrialists withdrew their support; in March 1922 the weekly Der Bund – Związek began to be published irregularly; two months later it ceased publication, with a final circulation of 40,000 copies.

The following November, Heinrich Skowronek stood for election to the regional assembly of Upper Silesian Province (Provinziallandtag). Instead of the Union of Upper Silesians, his election list was named for the Upper Silesian Catholic People's Party (German: Oberschlesische Katholische Volkspartei, Polish: Górnośląska Katolicka Partia Ludowa). A Catholic Silesian party, opposing Catholic German and Polish parties, was doomed to failure without support and Joseph Musiol did not stand for election. With little support for Skowronek's list, his candidates returned to the Catholic People's Party (German: Katolische Volkspartei - Zentrum and the German Centre Party.

After the election Adam Napieralski, editor of Polish-language newspaper Katolik (The Catholic), established a law office to defend Polish-speaking Upper Silesians in German Upper Silesia. The office was managed by Joseph Musiol, chairman of the Union of Upper Silesians and former deputy of the Prussian parliament (who had just lost his seat). He represented the Catholic People's Party, after being expelled from the German Centre Party in April 1921 for his independence activities. Musiol sent questionnaires about discrimination against Polish-speaking Upper Silesians on behalf of the Union of Upper Silesians and was its chairman until 1924, when it dissolved.

After the Union of Upper Silesians, the idea of Upper Silesian independence remained; in 1925 the chief of police in Gliwice told Alfons Proske, president of the province of Upper Silesia, "The idea of a free state is still alive in German Upper Silesia". In areas bordering Poland, former members of the Union of Upper Silesians returned to political parties—primarily the Catholic People's Party (German: Katholische Volkspartei), which said that it represented Germans and "German-disposed Silesians" in the Autonomous Silesian Voivodeship with the slogan "Upper Silesia for Upper Silesians". The Union of Upper Silesian Defence was founded in 1925 by former Polish activists, with Jan Kustos its chairman.

== See also ==
- Ewald Latacz
- Joseph Musiol
- Silesian Autonomy Movement, a modern political party
- Silesian People's Party
- Józef Kożdoń
- Josef Cichy
- Theofil Kupka
- Jan Kustos

== Sources ==
- Dariusz Jerczyński, Historia Narodu Śląskiego. Prawdziwe dzieje ziem śląskich od średniowiecza do progu trzeciego tysiąclecia. (History of Silesian Nation), second edition (implemented and corrected), Zabrze 2006 ISBN 978-83-60540-55-8.
- Andrea Schmidt-Rösler, Autonomie und Separatismusbestrebungen in Oberschlesien 1918-1922, „Zeitschrift für Ostmitteleuropa" Forschung 1999, Heft 1.
- Guido Hitze, Carl Ulitzka (1873–1953) oder Oberschlesien zwischen den Weltkriegen, Düsseldorf 2002.
- Tomasz Kamusella, Silesia and Central European Nationalisms: The Emergence of National and Ethnic Groups in Prussian Silesia and Austrian Silesia, 1848-1918 (Ser: Central European Studies; foreword by Professor Charles W. Ingrao). 2007. West Lafayette, IN: Purdue University Press, 386 pp. ISBN 978-1-55753-371-5
- Upper Silesia 1870-1920: Between Region, Religion, Nation and Ethnicity: journal article by Tomasz Kamusella; East European Quarterly, Vol. 38, 2004
