= Frýdek =

Frýdek may refer to:

- Frýdek-Místek, a city in the Moravian-Silesian Region of the Czech Republic
  - Frýdek, Frýdek-Místek, an administrative part of Frýdek-Místek
- Christián Frýdek (born 1999), Czech footballer
- Martin Frýdek (born 1969), Czech footballer
- Martin Frýdek (footballer, born 1992), Czech footballer

== See also ==
- Frydek
