= Volkswacht =

Volkswacht (German for 'People's Watch') is a name that have been used by a number of newspaper, generally with a leftist or social democratic orientation:

- Volkswacht of Bielefeld, 1890-1933
- Volkswacht of Silesia, Breslau, 1890-1933
- Volkswacht (Danzig)
- Volkswacht for the Upper Palatinate and Lower Bavaria, Regensburg, 1920-1933
- Volkswacht (Freiburg), 1911-1933
- Volkswacht am Bodensee, Romanshorn, Switzerland, 1909-1934
- Volkswacht (Insterburg)
