= Joseph Musiol =

Joseph Musiol (Polish: Józef Musioł; born 22 June 1865 in Mikołów) was a Silesian politician. He served as secretary of the Catholic Trade Union, as a member of the town council in Bytom, and as leader of a local group there. He was also a member of the German Catholic Centre Party and a member of the leadership of the Catholic People’s Party of Upper Silesia, an autonomic division of the Centre Party.

Musiol served as a deputy in the Prussian Parliament from 26 January 1919 to 22 November 1922 and argued for the independence of Upper Silesia as a multilingual but unified state like Switzerland. He was expelled from the Catholic People's Party in April 1921 for activities that clashed with the official stance of the party. Around the same time, all local groups in Bytom were dissolved, and in early February 1921, Musiol was excluded from the leadership of his party. After leaving his position as deputy, he became manager of the law office of the Polish-language newspaper Katolik (Catholic). He co-founded and managed a propaganda of the Union of Upper Silesians beginning in 1919, and he served as leader of the Union from December 1921 until its dissolution, in 1924.

In 1922, he ran for a town council position in Bytom as part of the Union Tenants Protection. Nothing is known of his life after 1924.

== Sources ==
- Dariusz Jerczyński, "Józef Musioł (Joseph Musiol)", in: Orędownicy niepodległości Śląska, Zabrze: 2005, ISBN 83-919589-4-9 pages 144-150.
- Guido Hitze, Carl Ulitzka (1873–1953) oder Oberschlesien zwischen den Weltkriegen, Düsseldorf: 2002.
- Andrea Schmidt-Rösler, "Autonomie und Separatismusbestrebungen in Oberschlesien 1918-1922", in Zeitschrift für Ostmitteleuropa Forschung, 1, 1999.
- Günther Doose, Die separatistische Bewegung in Oberschlesien nach dem Ersten Weltkrieg (1918–1922), Wiesbaden: 1987.

== See also ==
- Ewald Latacz
- Józef Kożdoń
- Josef Cichy
- Silesian People's Party
- Theofil Kupka
- Silesian Autonomy Movement
