= Volkswacht (Insterburg) =

German newspaper (1919–1933)

- Founded: 1919
- Ceased publication: 1933
- Political alignment: Socialism
- Language: German
- Headquarters: Insterburg

Volkswacht ('People's Guard') was a German Social Democratic newspaper published from Insterburg 1919-1933. It carried the by-line "Organ for the Social Democracy of the Circle of Insterburg, Gumbinnen, Stallupönen, Darkehmen, Gerdauen". It was one of the most long-lasting local labour newspapers of East Prussia during the inter-bellum years. Volkswacht was linked to Königsberger Volkszeitung. As of 1920 it was published six times a week, and had a circulation of 6,000. Volkswacht was banned in 1933.
