= Josef Koždoň =

Czechoslovak politician and mayor (1873–1949)

- Jozef Kożdōń
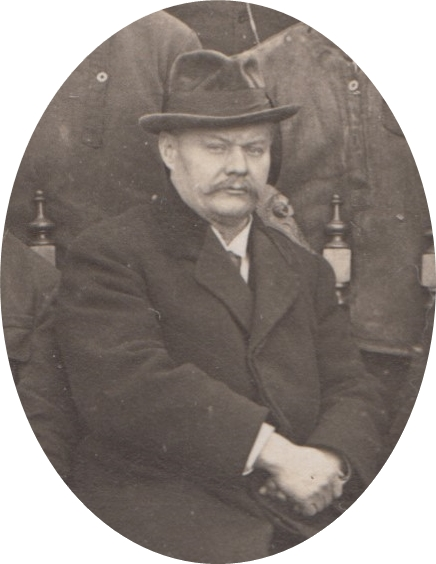
- Portrait of Josef Koždoň taken in Skoczów sometime between 1915-1920

Deputy of Silesian Landtag
- In office 1909–1918
- Monarch: Franz Joseph I
- Constituency: Opava

Mayor
- In office 1923–1928
- President: Tomáš Masaryk
- Prime Minister: Antonín Švehla
- Constituency: Český Těšín

Personal details
- Born: September 8, 1873 Leszna Górna, Silesia, Austria-Hungary
- Died: December 7, 1949 (aged 76) Opava, Czechoslovak Republic
- Party: Silesian People's Party

Josef Koždoň (Silesian: Zeflij Kożdůń; 8 September 1873 – 7 December 1949) was a Silesian autonomist politician.

== Biography ==
Koždoň was born on 8 September 1873 in Leszna Górna. He was a teacher (from 1893) and principal (from 1902) of primary schools in Strumień (1893–1898) and Skoczów (1898–1918), an active member of the Country Teachers Union in Austrian Silesia, the founder of the Polish public reading-room in Strumień and a co-founder of the German Reader's Association (Leseverein) in Skoczów, the founder (in summer 1908) and leader of the Silesian People's Party (1909–1938), a co-founder and general secretary of the Union of Silesians (1910–1938) in East Silesia, spokesman of autonomy or independence of Silesia and spokesman of Silesian nation, founder of the Committee for the Maintenance of Clearness of the Silesian dialect in 1910, the deputy of the Silesian Parliament in Opava in the period 1909-1918, member of the town council in Skoczów from 1911, editor of the most popular Silesian newspaper in East Silesia Ślązak (Silesian) and the magazine Śląski Kalendarz Ludowy (Silesian People's Calendar), member of the Austrian Committee to Support for Soldiers' Families in the period 1914-1918, and from October to December 1918 a political prisoner in Polish prison in Kraków. Koždoň was also a member of the Czechoslovak delegation at the Paris Peace Conference in 1919, a member of the Administration Commission for Country Silesia in Opava in the period 1919-1927, four-time mayor of Český Těšín in the period 1923–1938, author of many political articles, letters, petitions and brochures, for example author of petition "representation of Silesian nationality" to Sir Walter Runciman on the question of a plebiscite in Cieszyn Silesia in 1938. He was also the founder (1925) and president (in the period 1940-1944) of the Silesian People's Bank.

Koždoň died on 7 December 1949 (Note: This day is written on Kożdoń's grave and is included in German historical literature, although Polish authors have written 15 December.) in Opava, at the age of 76.

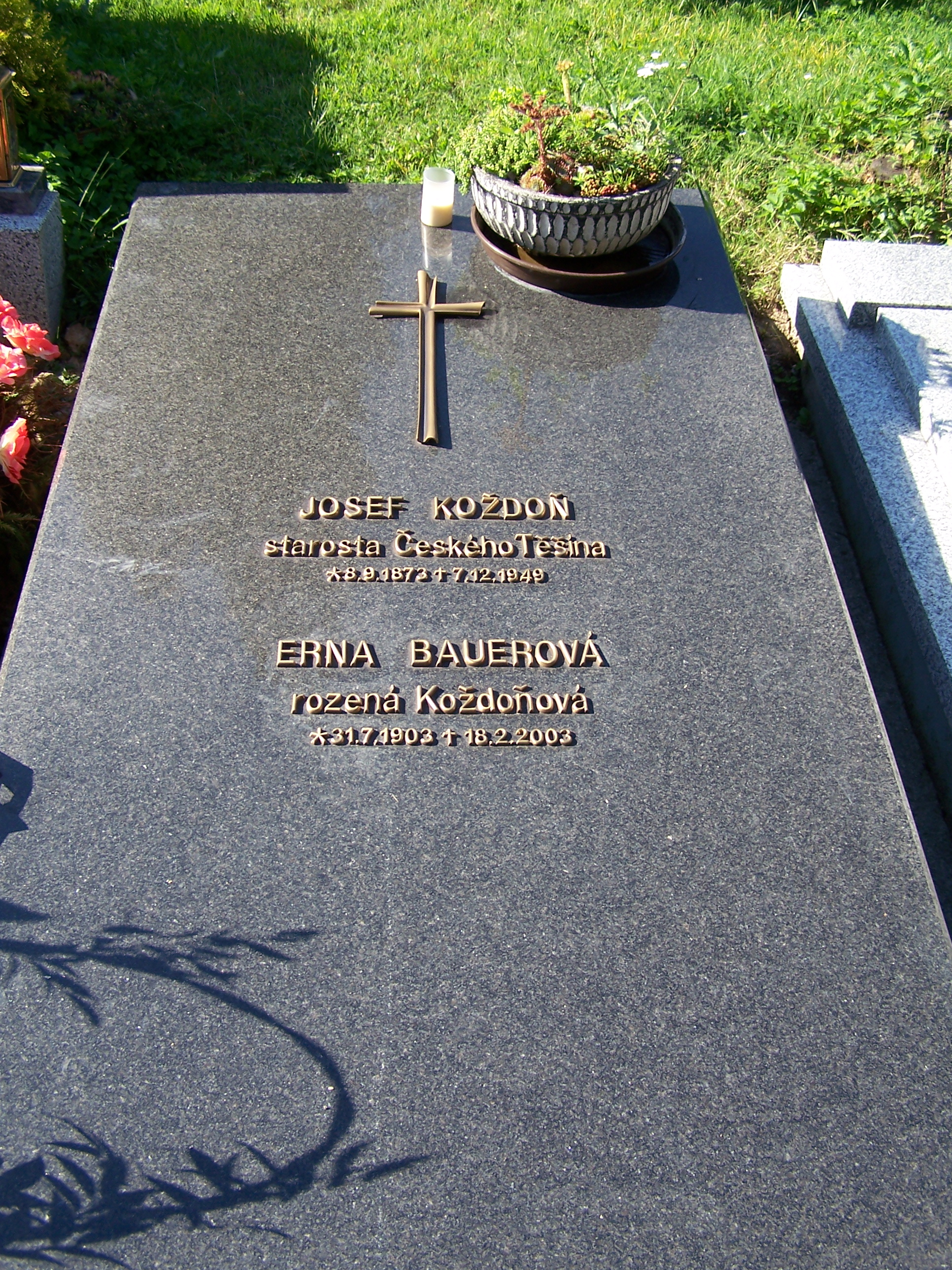
Symbolic Józef Koždoň's tomb at a cemetery in Český Těšín

== Controversies ==
Koždoň wrote: "I'm not a German, but I'm not and I don't want to be a Pole, too. I'm Polish speaking Silesian [...] A language commonwealth doesn't decide about a national union, deciding factor is spirit commonwealth. Silesia has this commonwealth - own separate land's traditions". His politics supported bilingual Polish-German education, for example Koždoň supported insertion of German language to Polish primary school in Górki Wielkie and demanded insertion of Polish language to German grammar and gymnasial schools in Cieszyn. His politics supported German-language Silesian culture, Slavic Silesian folk culture and local Slavic Silesian dialects. Koždoň's stances on the position of German culture in Cieszyn Silesia remain however controversial, as several historians claim he and his supporters accented German character of the whole Cieszyn Silesia and supported Germanization policies.

On 18 September 1938 Walter Harbich, as leader of "assembly of Silesian nationality", sent a telegram to Adolf Hitler, requesting independence of Cieszyn Silesia under a protection of Nazi Germany. Petition in the same question was sent to the prime minister of the UK Neville Chamberlain, too. On 2 October 1938 Rudolf Francus and Walter Harbich - leaders of German-language faction of Silesian People's Party sent a next telegram to Hitler, speaking in protest of Silesian people and German people from Bohumín against cession of the Trans-Olza to Poland. All the telegrams were sent without knowledge of Koždoň.

== Works ==
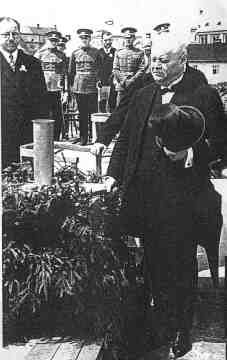
Józef Koždoň as mayor of Český Těšín

- Koždoň Josef, Über die Sonderstellung der schlesischen Polen, die nationalen Verhältnisse und die allpolnische Propaganda in Ostschlesien (Beilage Rede des Landtagabg[eordneten] Koždon in der Budgetdebatte des schlesischen Landtages (44. Sitzung) am 8. November 1910), Skotschau 1910.
- Koždoň Josef, Denkschrift der Schles[ischen] Volkspartei an die Interallierte Volksabstimmungkommission in Teschen, Cieszyn 1920.
- Koždoň Józef, Krzyk rozpaczy o pomoc dla Ślązaków (dodatek skargi i żale Śląskiej Partyi Ludowej do międzynarodowej Komisyi plebiscytowej w Cieszynie w sprawie polskich aktów gwałtu i terroru), Moravská Ostrava 1920.
- Koždoň Josef, 4. Beschwerde-Eingabe der schlesischen Volkspartei an die internationale Volksabstimmungkommission in Teschen, Moravská Ostrava 1920.
- Koždoň Józef, Memoryał Śląskiej Partyi Ludowej w sprawie plebiscytu w Księstwie Cieszyńskim wystosowany do Międzynarodowej Komisyi Plebiscytowej w Cieszynie, Moravská Ostrava 1920.
- Koždoň Josef, Das Recht unserer schlesischen Heimat auf die verwaltungmässige Selbständigkeit, Troppau 1927.
- Koždoň Josef, Teschen und Teschner Land, Sonderdruck aus dem Werk „Schlesien“ Band 8, Berlin-Fiedenau 1930.
- Koždoň Josef, "Aus der jüngster Geschichte der Teschener Landes – Erinnerungen und Erlebnisse", in: Schlesisches Jahrbuch, Breslau 1940.
- Koždoň Józef, Mój stosunek do Polski, Polaków i do ludności naszej, Český Těšín 1946.
- Koždoň Josef, Moje zkušenosti ve službě vlasti, můj osud, Opava 1948.

== See also ==
- Silesian People's Party
- Josef Cichy
- Union of Upper Silesians
- Ewald Latacz
- Joseph Musiol
- Theofil Kupka
- Silesian Autonomy Movement
