= Cisownica =

- Village
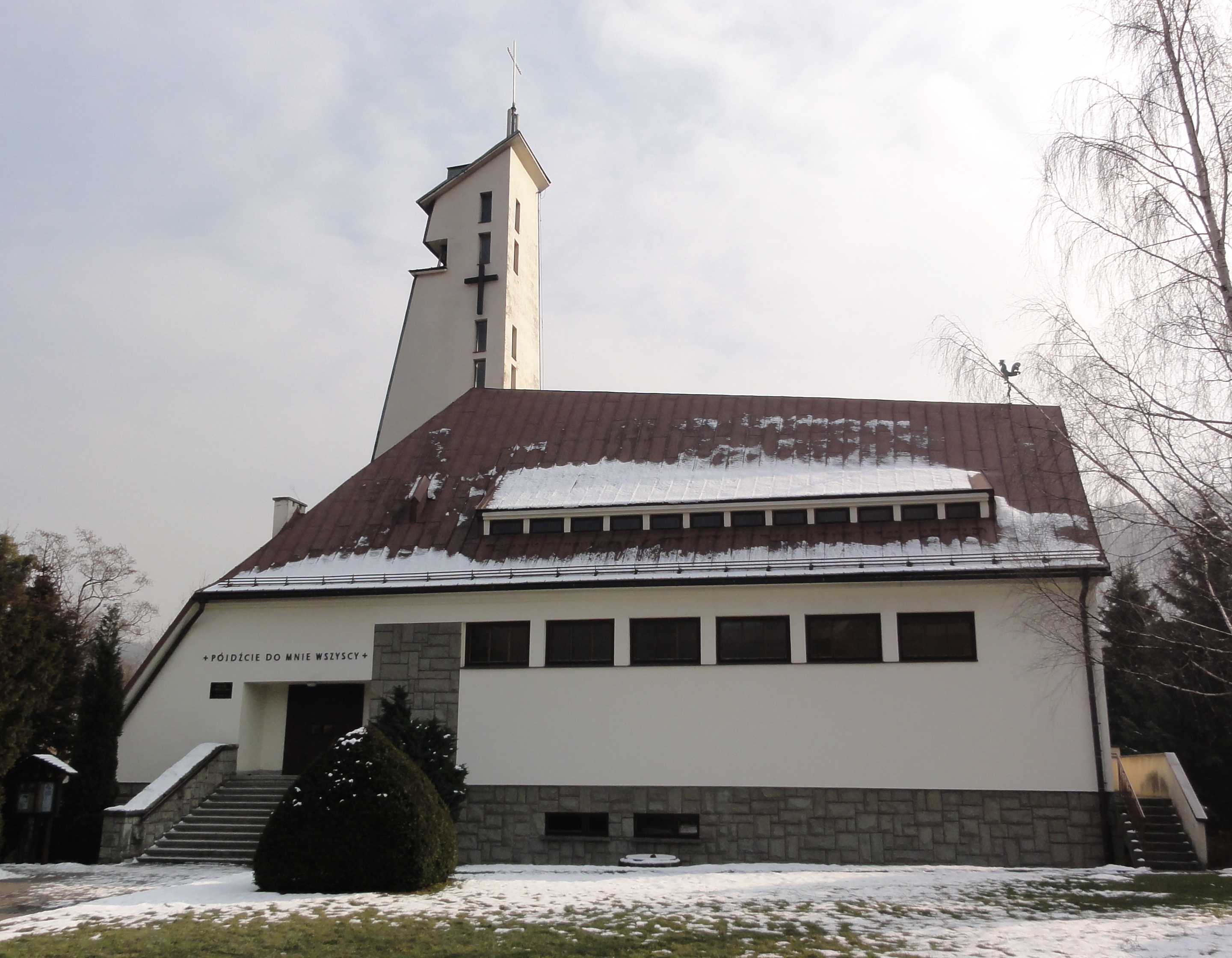
- Lutheran church of John the Baptist

- Location within Poland
- Coordinates: 49°43′15.45″N 18°45′46.17″E
- Country: Poland
- Voivodeship: Silesian
- County: Cieszyn
- Gmina: Goleszów
- First mentioned: 1305

Government
  - Mayor: Karol Macura

Area
  - Total: 9.5967 km^{2} (3.7053 sq mi)

Population (2014)
  - Total: 1,717
  - Density: 178.9/km^{2} (463.4/sq mi)
- Time zone: UTC+1 (CET)
  - Summer (DST): UTC+2 (CEST)
- Postal code: 43-440
- Car plates: SCI

Cisownica is a village in Gmina Goleszów, Cieszyn County, Silesian Voivodeship, southern Poland, close to the border with the Czech Republic. In 2008 it had a population of 1,705. It lies in the historical region of Cieszyn Silesia on the slopes of Mała Czantoria mountain.

The name of the village is derived from the taxus trees ("cis" in Polish) which grew here in the past in large numbers. Cisownica in recent years has become a popular tourist destination, due to its vicinity to the Silesian Beskids mountain range.

== History ==
The settlement was first mentioned in a Latin document of Diocese of Wrocław called Liber fundationis episcopatus Vratislaviensis from around 1305 as item in Cyssownica. It meant that the village was in the process of location (the size of land to pay a tithe from was not yet precised). The creation of the village was a part of a larger settlement campaign taking place in the late 13th century on the territory of what will be later known as Upper Silesia.

Politically the village belonged initially to the Duchy of Teschen, formed in 1290 in the process of feudal fragmentation of Poland and was ruled by a local branch of Piast dynasty. In 1327 the duchy became a fee of Kingdom of Bohemia, which after 1526 became part of the Habsburg monarchy.

In the 18th and 19th centuries siderite was mined here, the last mine closed in 1870.

After Revolutions of 1848 in the Austrian Empire a modern municipal division was introduced in the re-established Austrian Silesia. The village as a municipality was subscribed to the political district of Bielsko and the legal district of Skoczów. According to the censuses conducted in 1880, 1890, 1900 and 1910 the population of the village grew from 841 in 1880 to 953 in 1910, with majority of the inhabitants being native Polish-speakers (99.6–100%), mostly Lutherans (89.6% in 1910), followed by Catholics (9.9% in 1910) and Jews (5 people). The village was also traditionally inhabited by Cieszyn Vlachs, speaking Cieszyn Silesian dialect.

After the World War I, fall of Austria-Hungary, Polish–Czechoslovak War and division of Cieszyn Silesia, the village became a part of the Second Polish Republic. After German invasion of Poland in 1939, the area became a part of Nazi Germany until 1945.

== Religion ==
A Lutheran church was built here in 1981, as a filial church of Ustroń. In 1986 it became an independent parish of the Diocese of Cieszyn.

== People ==
- Jura Gajdzica, peasant writer, lived here
- Jan Sztwiertnia, member of Sejm, was born here
