= Bażanowice =

- Village
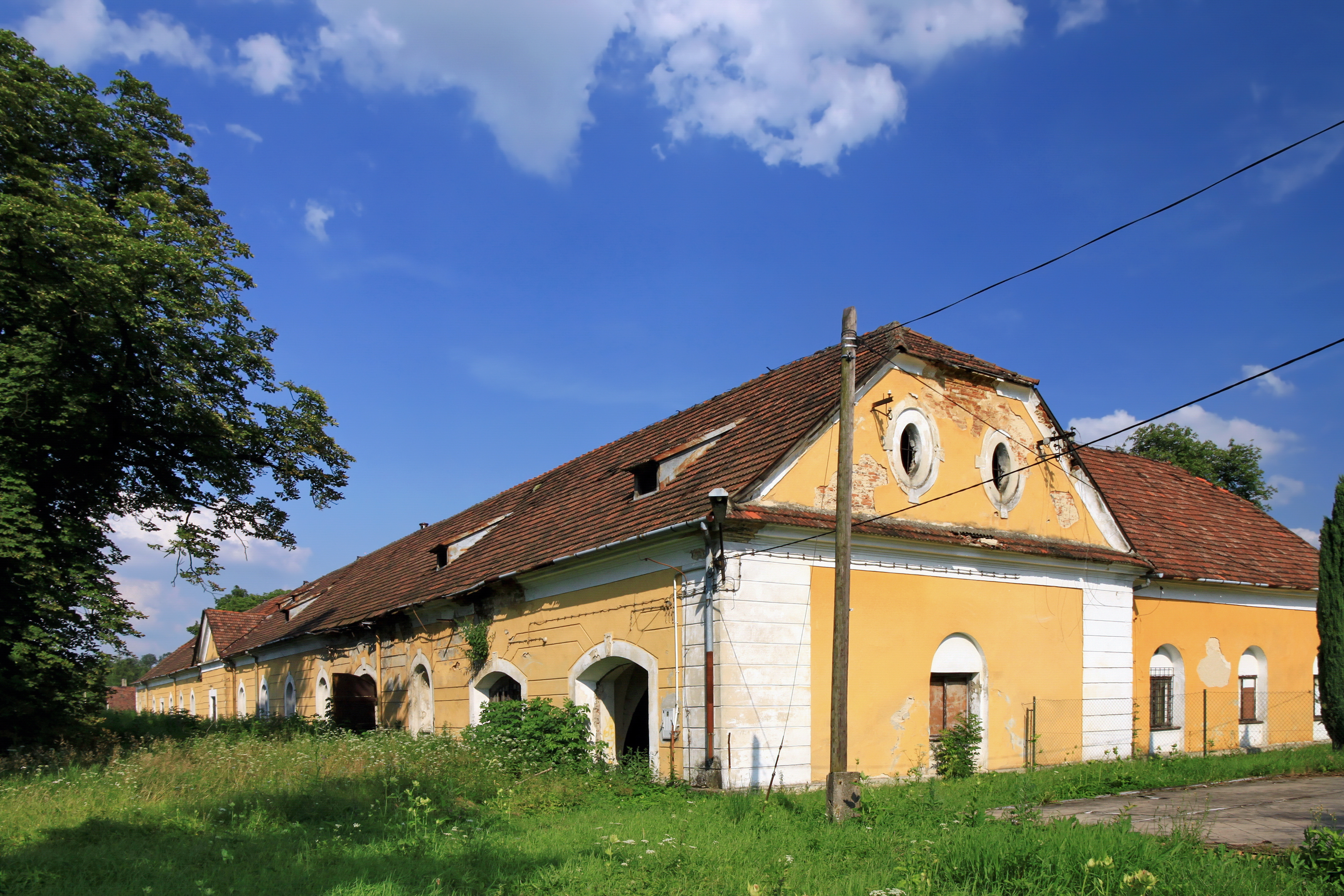
- Old farmhouse in Bażanowice

- Location within Poland
- Coordinates: 49°44′14.02″N 18°42′16.55″E
- Country: Poland
- Voivodeship: Silesian
- County: Cieszyn
- Gmina: Goleszów
- First mentioned: 1523

Government
  - Mayor: Jan Polok

Area
  - Total: 3.81 km^{2} (1.47 sq mi)

Population (2022)
  - Total: 1,255
  - Density: 329/km^{2} (850/sq mi)
- Time zone: UTC+1 (CET)
  - Summer (DST): UTC+2 (CEST)
- Postal code: 43–440
- Car plates: SCI

Bażanowice (baʐanɔvit͡sɛ) is a village in Gmina Goleszów, Cieszyn County, Silesian Voivodeship, southern Poland, close to the border with the Czech Republic. It lies in the Silesian Foothills in the historical region of Cieszyn Silesia.

The name is patronymic in origin derived from personal name Bażan.

== History ==
It was first mentioned in a written document in 1523 as Bazanowicze. Politically it belonged then to the Duchy of Teschen, a fee of the Kingdom of Bohemia, which after 1526 became part of the Habsburg monarchy.

After Revolutions of 1848 in the Austrian Empire a modern municipal division was introduced in the re-established Austrian Silesia. The village as a municipality was subscribed to the political and legal district of Cieszyn. According to the censuses conducted in 1880, 1890, 1900 and 1910 the population of the municipality grew from 361 in 1880 to 522 in 1910 with a majority being native Polish-speakers (between 94.8% and 98.5%) accompanied by a small German-speaking minority (at most 27 or 5.2% in 1910). In terms of religion in 1910 majority were Protestants (73%), followed by Roman Catholics (25.8%) and Jews (6 people). The village was also traditionally inhabited by Cieszyn Vlachs, speaking Cieszyn Silesian dialect.

After World War I, fall of Austria-Hungary, Polish–Czechoslovak War and the division of Cieszyn Silesia in 1920, it became a part of Poland.

In 1930 a dairy was founded in the village, it operates to date producing emmentaler and other milk products.

It was then annexed by Nazi Germany at the beginning of World War II. After the war it was restored to Poland.

== Religion ==
There is a church of the Evangelical-Augsburg Church in the village. It was built in 1981 by Stanisław Kwaśniewicz.

== Sites of interest ==
- Late Baroque stone figure of John of Nepomuk.
- Old farmhouse from the turn of the 18th and 19th centuries.
