= Godziszów, Silesian Voivodeship =

Godziszów
- Village
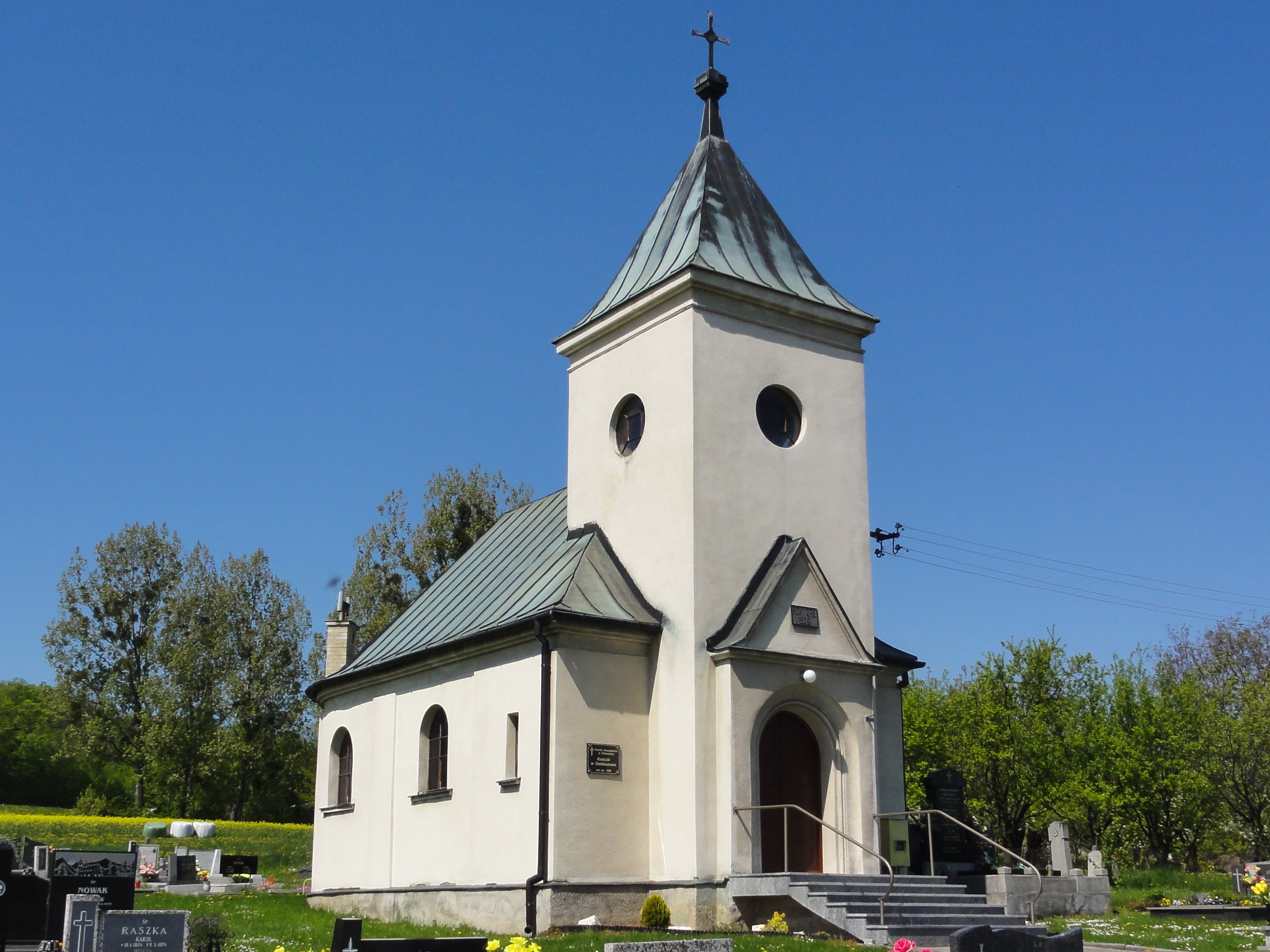
- Lutheran church

- Location within Poland
- Coordinates: 49°45′37.91″N 18°45′26.75″E
- Country: Poland
- Voivodeship: Silesian
- County: Cieszyn
- Gmina: Goleszów
- First mentioned: 1445

Government
  - Mayor: Beata Jaworek

Area
  - Total: 5.6 km^{2} (2.2 sq mi)

Population (2014)
  - Total: 604
  - Density: 110/km^{2} (280/sq mi)
- Time zone: UTC+1 (CET)
  - Summer (DST): UTC+2 (CEST)
- Postal code: 43-440
- Car plates: SCI

Godziszów is a village in Gmina Goleszów, Cieszyn County, Silesian Voivodeship, southern Poland, close to the border with the Czech Republic. The village lies in the Silesian Foothills, in the historical region of Cieszyn Silesia.

== History ==
The village was first mentioned in 1445 as na mezy Godyessowsske. Politically the village belonged then to the Duchy of Teschen, a fee of the Kingdom of Bohemia, which after 1526 became part of the Habsburg monarchy.

After Revolutions of 1848 in the Austrian Empire a modern municipal division was introduced in the re-established Austrian Silesia. The village as a municipality was subscribed to the political district of Bielsko and the legal district of Skoczów. According to the censuses conducted in 1880, 1890, 1900 and 1910 the population of the municipality grew from 412 in 1880 to 525 in 1910, with majority of the inhabitants being native Polish-speakers (96.6%-99.8%) and a few people German-speaking (most 15 or 2.9% in 1910) and Czech-speaking (most 9 or 2.2% in 1890), mostly Protestants (87.7% in 1910), followed by Roman Catholics (11.2% in 1910) and Jews (6 people). The village was also traditionally inhabited by Cieszyn Vlachs, speaking Cieszyn Silesian dialect.

After World War I, fall of Austria-Hungary, Polish–Czechoslovak War and the division of Cieszyn Silesia in 1920, it became a part of Poland. It was then annexed by Nazi Germany at the beginning of World War II. After the war it was restored to Poland.
