= Wojciech Korfanty =

Polish activist and politician (1873–1939)

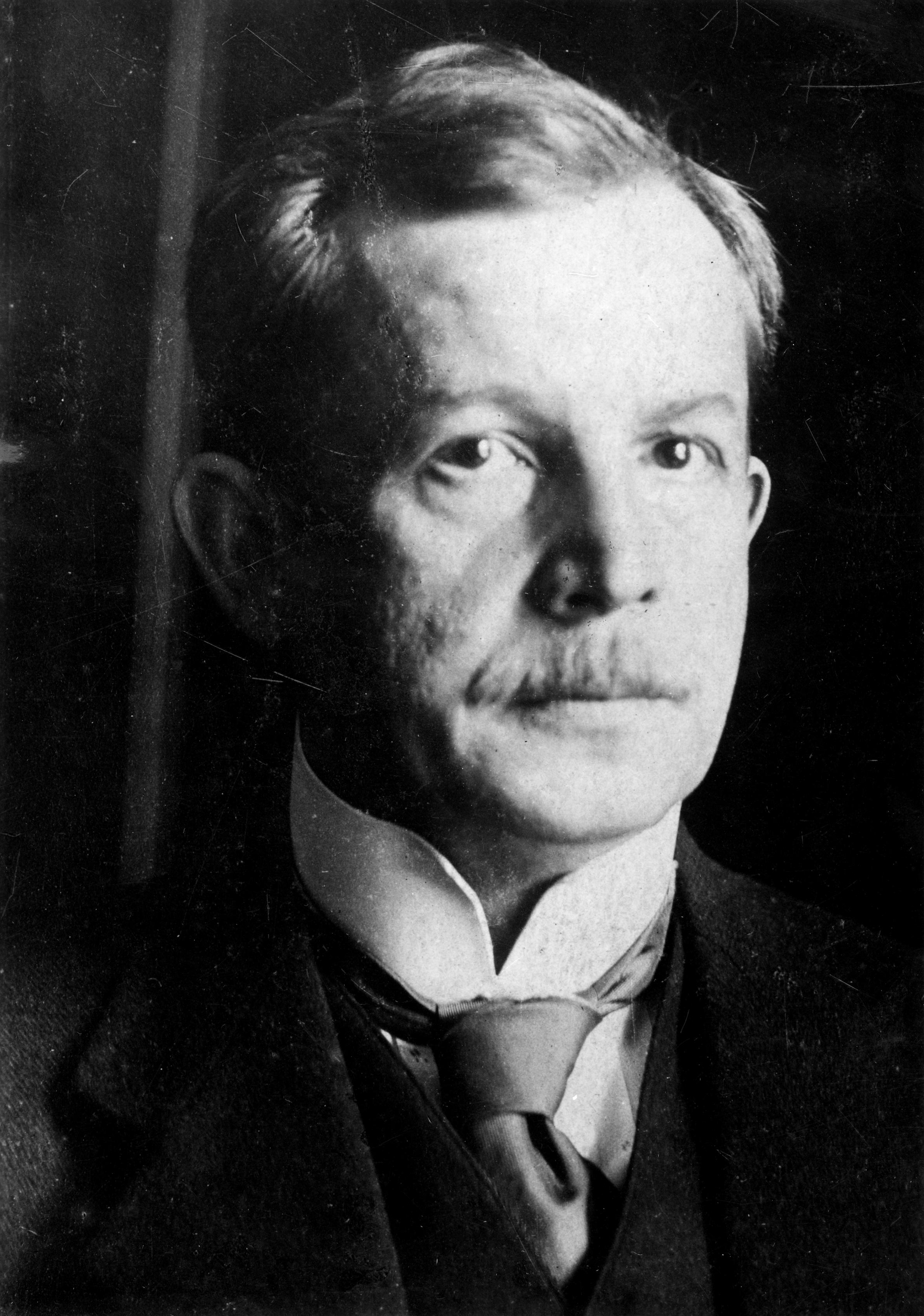
- Wojciech Korfanty in 1925

Deputy Prime Minister of Poland
- In office 27 October 1923 – 14 December 1923
- Prime Minister: Wincenty Witos
- Preceded by: Stanisław Głąbiński
- Succeeded by: Stanisław Thugutt

Personal details
- Born: Adalbert Korfanty; 20 April 1873 Siemianowitz-Laurahütte, German Empire (now Poland)
- Died: 17 August 1939 (aged 66) Warsaw, Poland
- Party: Polish Christian Democratic Party; Labour Party
- Spouse: Elżbieta Korfantowa
- Occupation: Politician, activist

Wojciech Korfanty (IPA: [ˈvɔjt͡ɕɛx kɔrˈfantɨ]; christened Adalbert Korfanty; 20 April 1873 – 17 August 1939) was a Polish activist, journalist and politician, who served as a member of the German parliaments, the Reichstag and the Prussian Landtag, and later, in the Polish Sejm. Briefly, he also was a paramilitary leader, known for organizing the Polish Silesian Uprisings in Upper Silesia, which after World War I was contested by Germany and Poland. Korfanty fought to protect Poles from discrimination and the policies of Germanisation in Upper Silesia before the war and sought to join Silesia to Poland after Poland regained its independence. His assessment varies, while in Poland he is viewed as a freedom fighter, in Germany he was viewed as a nationalist and coup leader.

== Early life ==
He was born the son of a coal miner in Sadzawka, part of Siemianowice (at the time Laurahütte), in Prussian Silesia, then part of the German Empire. From 1895 until 1901, he studied philosophy, law, and economics, first at the Technische Hochschule in Charlottenburg (Berlin) (1895) and then at the University of Breslau, where the Marxist Werner Sombart was among his teachers. Korfanty and Sombart remained friends for many years.

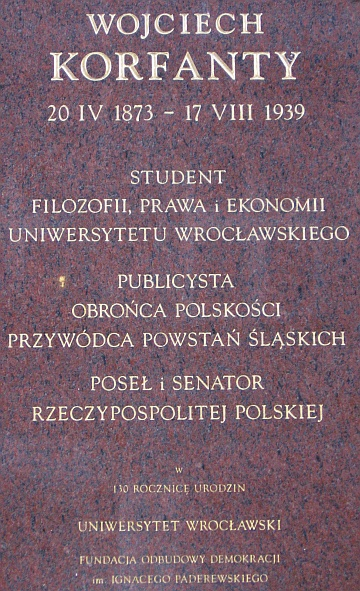
A plaque dedicated by the University of Wrocław to celebrate the 130th anniversary of Korfanty's birth in 2003. The text reads: Student of philosophy, law, and economics at Wrocław University; journalist, defender of Polishness, leader of the Silesian Uprisings; member of parliament and senator of the Polish Republic.

In 1901, Korfanty became editor-in-chief of the Polish language paper Górnoslązak (The Upper Silesian), in which he appealed to the national consciousness of the region's Polish-speaking population.

In 1903, Korfanty was elected to the German Reichstag and in 1904 also to the Prussian Landtag, where he represented the independent Polish circle (Polskie koło). That was a significant departure from tradition, as the Polish minority in Germany had so far predominantly supported the conservative Centre Party, which represented the large Catholic community in Germany, which felt inferior in the Protestant-dominated Reich. However, when it refused to advocate Polish minority rights (beyond the Poles' rights as Catholics), the Poles distanced themselves from it, seeking protection elsewhere. In a paper entitled Precz z Centrum (Away with the Centre Party, 1901), Korfanty urged the Catholic Polish-speaking minority in Germany to overcome their national indifference and shift their political allegiance from supra-national Catholicism to the cause of the Polish nation. However, Korfanty retained his Christian Democratic convictions and later returned to them in domestic Polish politics.

== Polish restoration ==
During World War I, in 1916, a Kingdom of Poland was proclaimed by the German and the Austro-Hungarian Empires, which was then replaced by an independent Polish state in 1918. In a Reichstag speech on 25 October 1918, Korfanty demanded that the provinces of West Prussia (including Ermeland (Warmia)) and the city of Danzig (Gdańsk), the Province of Posen, and parts of the provinces of East Prussia (Masuria) and Silesia (Upper Silesia) to be included in the Polish state.

After the war, during the Great Poland Uprising, Korfanty became a member of the Naczelna Rada Ludowa (Supreme People's Council) in Poznań and a member of the Polish provisional parliament, the Constituanta-Sejm. He was also the head of the Polish plebiscite committee in Upper Silesia. He was one of the leaders of the Second Silesian Uprising in 1920 and the Third Silesian Uprising in 1921, which were Polish insurrections against German rule in Upper Silesia. The German authorities were forced to leave their positions by the League of Nations. Poland was allotted by the League of Nations roughly half of the population and valuable mining districts, which were eventually attached to Poland. Korfanty was accused by Germans of organizing terrorism against German civilians of Upper Silesia. German propaganda newspapers also "smeared" him with ordering the murder of Silesian politician Theofil Kupka.

== Polish politics ==
Korfanty was a member of the national Sejm from 1922 to 1930 and in the Silesian Sejm (1922–1935), where he represented a Christian Democratic viewpoint. He opposed the autonomy of the Silesian Voivodship, which he saw as an obstacle against its reintegration into Poland. However, he defended the rights of the German minority in Upper Silesia because he believed that the prosperity of minorities enriched the whole society of a region.

He briefly acted as vice-premier in the government of Wincenty Witos (October–December 1923). From 1924, he resumed his journalist activities as editor-in-chief of the papers Rzeczpospolita (The Republic, not to be confused with the modern newspaper of the same name) and Polonia. He opposed the May Coup of Józef Piłsudski and the subsequent establishment of Sanacja. In 1930, Korfanty was arrested and imprisoned in the Brest-Litovsk fortress, together with other leaders of the Centrolew, an alliance of left-wing and centrist parties in opposition to the ruling government.

== Exile ==
In 1935, he was forced to leave Poland and emigrated to Czechoslovakia, from where he participated in the centre-right Morges Front group, founded by émigrés Ignacy Paderewski and Władysław Sikorski. After the German invasion of Czechoslovakia, Korfanty moved on to France. He returned to Poland in April 1939, after Nazi Germany had cancelled the Polish-German non-aggression pact of 1934, hoping that the renewed threat to Polish independence would help overcome the domestic political cleavage. He was arrested immediately upon arrival. In August, he was released as unfit for prison because of his bad health and died shortly afterwards, two weeks before World War II began with the German invasion of Poland. Although the cause of death remains unclear, it has been claimed that the treatment he received in prison may have caused his health to deteriorate.

== Legacy ==
After 1945, when the Polish Communists sought legitimisation as the champions and guarantors of Polish independence, Korfanty was finally rehabilitated as a national hero for his fight to protect the Polish population in Upper Silesia from discrimination and for his efforts to join the Polish population in Silesia to Poland.

Today, many streets, places, and institutions are named after him. When Opole Silesia became part of Poland in 1945, the town of Friedland in Oberschlesien, in German Upper Silesia, was renamed Korfantów in his honour.

== Literature ==
- Sigmund Karski: Albert (Wojciech) Korfanty. Eine Biographie. Dülmen 1990. ISBN 3-87466-118-0
- Marian Orzechowski: Wojciech Korfanty. Breslau 1975.
