= Šumbark =

- Municipal part of Havířov
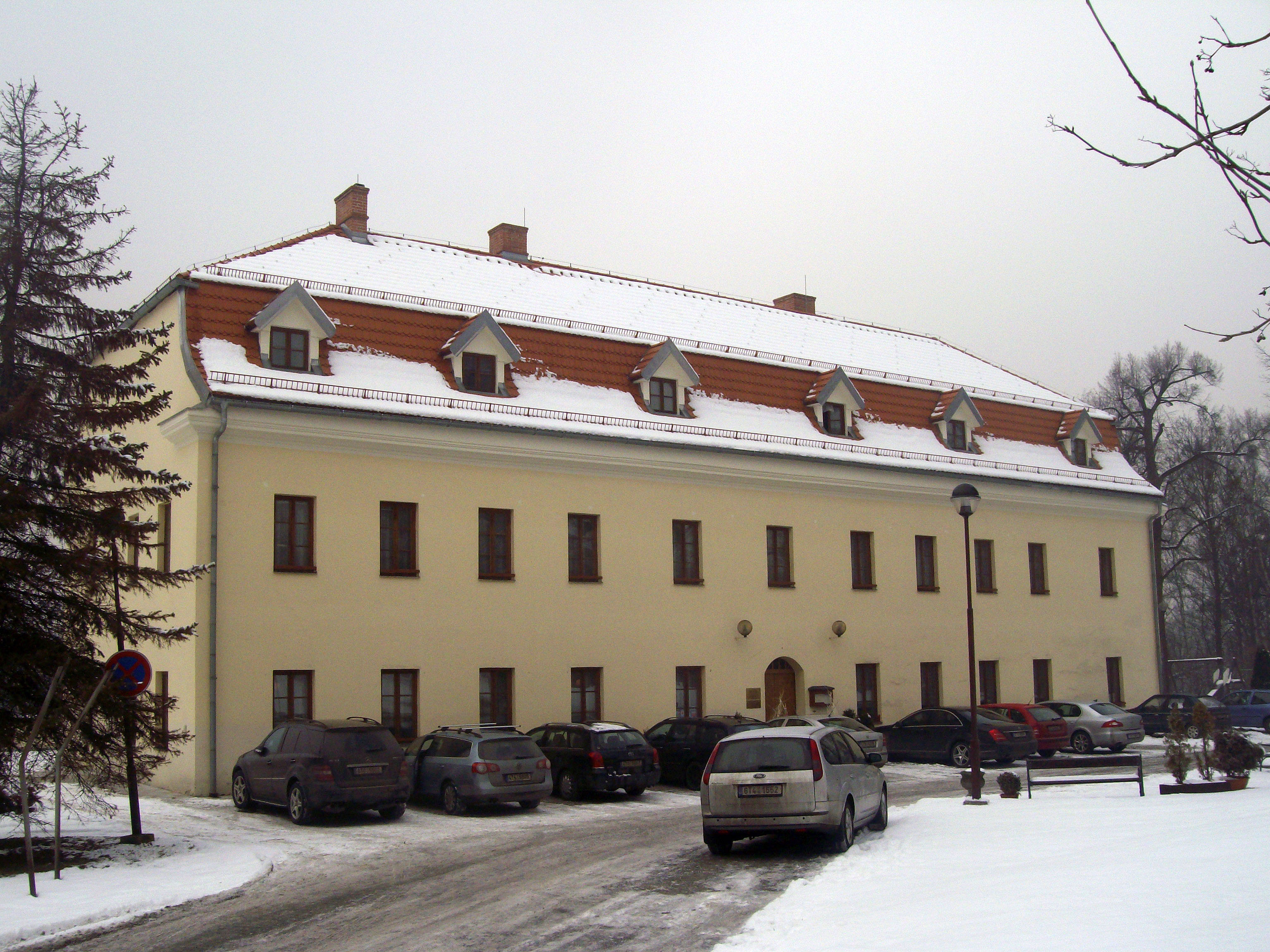
- Château in Šumbark
- Interactive map of Šumbark
- Coordinates: 49°47′55″N 18°24′53″E
- Country: Czech Republic
- Region: Moravian-Silesian
- District: Karviná
- Municipality: Havířov

Area
  - Total: 3.80 km^{2} (1.47 sq mi)

Population (2021)
  - Total: 15,668
  - Density: 4,120/km^{2} (10,700/sq mi)
- Time zone: UTC+1 (CET)
  - Summer (DST): UTC+2 (CEST)
- Postal code: 736 01

Šumbark (Polish: Szumbark, German: Schumbarg) was a village in Karviná District, Moravian-Silesian Region, Czech Republic. It was a separate municipality but in 1960 became administratively a part of the city of Havířov built in 1955. It has a population of about 16,000. It lies in the historical region of Cieszyn Silesia.

It was formerly a village but during the communist era a massive construction of so-called paneláks occurred during the construction of a new city of Havířov, and Šumbark was transformed to an urban neighbourhood. Still some old houses remain although the majority of the population of Šumbark live in paneláks.

== Etymology ==
The name is of German origin (Schönberg, German: beautiful hill) and was later polonized (not czechized as in Czech berg tends to change into perk, compare: Šumperk, Vimperk, etc.).

== History ==
The village was first mentioned in a written document in 1430 as Schomberg. Politically it belonged then to the Duchy of Teschen, formed in 1290 in the process of feudal fragmentation of Poland and was ruled by a local branch of Piast dynasty. In 1327 the duchy became a fee of the Kingdom of Bohemia, which after 1526 became part of the Habsburg monarchy.

The village became a seat of a Catholic parish probably prior to the 16th century. After the 1540s Protestant Reformation prevailed in the Duchy of Teschen and a local Catholic church was taken over by Lutherans. It was taken from them (as one from around fifty buildings in the region) by a special commission and given back to the Roman Catholic Church on 25 March 1654.

After Revolutions of 1848 in the Austrian Empire a modern municipal division was introduced in the re-established Austrian Silesia. The village as a municipality was subscribed to the political and legal district of Cieszyn. According to the censuses conducted in 1880, 1890, 1900 and 1910 the population of the municipality grew from 744 in 1880 to 1,380 in 1910. In 1880 the majority of inhabitants declared speaking Czech language (94.6%), followed by German (23 or 3.1%) and Polish (17 or 2.3%). In the next censuses majority declared speaking Polish (dropping from 98.9% in 1890 to 93.7% in 1910), minority declared speaking Czech (growing from 3 or 0.3% in 1890 to 64 or 4.9% in 1910) and German (growing from 7 or 0.8% in 1890 to 19 or 1.4% in 1910). In terms of religion in 1910 the majority were Protestants (50.4%), followed by Roman Catholics (47.9%), Jews (22 or 1.6%) and 2 persons adhering to another faiths. The village was also traditionally inhabited by Silesian Lachs, speaking Cieszyn Silesian dialect.

After World War I, fall of Austria-Hungary, Polish–Czechoslovak War and the division of Cieszyn Silesia in 1920, it became a part of Czechoslovakia. Following the Munich Agreement, in October 1938 together with the Zaolzie region it was annexed by Poland, administratively adjoined to Cieszyn County of Silesian Voivodeship. It was then annexed by Nazi Germany at the beginning of World War II. After the war it was restored to Czechoslovakia.

== Demographics ==
Historical population

Year	Pop.	±%
1869	692	—
1880	744	+7.5%
1890	897	+20.6%
1900	1,103	+23.0%
1910	1,380	+25.1%

Year	Pop.	±%
1921	1,279	−7.3%
1930	1,347	+5.3%
1950	1,522	+13.0%
1961	880	−42.2%
1970	9,564	+986.8%

Year	Pop.	±%
1980	8,229	−14.0%
1991	18,229	+121.5%
2001	23,323	+27.9%
2011	19,779	−15.2%
2021	15,668	−20.8%

Source: Censuses

== See also ==
- Polish minority in the Czech Republic
- Zaolzie
