= Theofil Kupka =

Theofil Kupka (Teofil/Theophil Kupka) (born 22 August 1885 in Marklowitz/Marklowice – died 20 November 1920 in Beuthen/Bytom) was a Silesian politician.

== Biography ==
Kupka's childhood was spent in Marklowitz (Marklowice), where he and his family (brothers Paul, Johann and Joseph and sister Paula) were active in the Polish-Catholic Association. He married his wife, Apolonia in Lipiny and lived with her in Beuthen. An official at a coal mine, he was put forward by Wojciech Korfanty to take over the management of the Organization Division of the Polish Plebiscite Commission in Beuthen. When Kupka became aware of its secret activities, Korfanty demanded that he change the direction and methods of plebiscite agitation. Afraid of a break, Korfanty expelled Kupka from the commission. Along with Kupka left other Silesian officials such as Cysarz, Zmuda, Gemander, Szymura, Pietruszka. This diminished Korfanty's support.

In September 1920 Theofil Kupka founded the Upper Silesian Plebiscite Committee (Das Oberschlesische Plebiszit-Komitee) in Beuthen. Initially this committee aimed for "free-state autonomy" (independence) of Upper Silesia and opposed the "corruption" of the Polish Plebiscite Commission.

Soon Theofil Kupka recognized that independence for Upper Silesia was unrealistic and therefore broke his cooperation with the Union of Upper Silesians and made contact with Kurt Urbanek, the German plebiscite commissioner. Afterwards, in November 1920, Kupka edited the first edition of the bilingual weekly Wola Ludu – Der Wille des Volkes (The Will of the People).

On 20 November 1920 at about five o’clock in the evening, two members of the Bojówka Polska (Polish Paramilitary Unit) named Myrcik and Jendrzej came to Kupka's house under the pretext of seeking jobs in the mine where he worked as an official. Once inside, they killed him with eight revolver shots to the head and chest in front of Kupka's pregnant wife and five children.

== Literature ==
- Dariusz Jerczyński, Orędownicy niepodległości Śląska, Zabrze 2005, ISBN 83-919589-4-9
- Władysław Zieliński, Ludzie i sprawy hotelu „Lomnitz“, Katowice 1985
- Sigmund Karski, Albert (Wojciech) Korfanty. Eine Biographie, Dülmen 1990, ISBN 3-87466-118-0

== See also ==
- Ewald Latacz
- Joseph Musiol
- Union of Upper Silesians
- Silesian People's Party
- Józef Kożdoń
