= Ewald Latacz =

German politician (1885–1953)

- Ywald Latacz
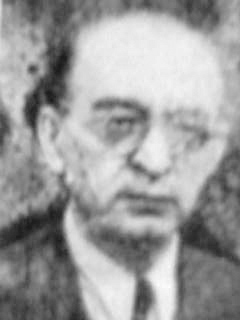
- Born: 24 June 1885; Kattowitz, German Empire
- Died: 12 February 1953 (aged 67); Frankfurt am Main, West Germany
- Occupations: Politician and Lawyer
- Movement: Union of Upper Silesians

Ewald Latacz (Silesian: Ywald Latacz; (born 24 June 1885 in Kattowitz (Katowice); died 12 February 1953 in Frankfurt am Main) was a Silesian politician. He practiced as a lawyer in Racibórz since 1913, and as a civil law notary since 1919. He also co-founded the Union of Upper Silesians, a movement dedicated to independence of Upper Silesia, in 1918.

He was active in the workers rights movement acting as a chairman of the Workers' Council in Wodzisław Śląski, and in the independence movement of Upper Silesia. He co-founded the Union of Upper Silesians in 1919. Latacz was a political prisoner from January to Spring 1919.

He was accused by German authorities of high treason. After his release, he became a civil law notary and lawyer in Berlin during 1922–1945, specialising in work with oil companies in the period 1922–1939.

A member of the Nazi party since 1933, Latacz joined three months after Hitler came to power. Latacz was also a member of the Nazi Union of German Lawyers until the end of the Second World War. In 1940, he applied for, but failed to receive, the permission of Nazi German judicial authorities of Silesian Province to open a law office in Upper Silesia.

Latacz never returned to Upper Silesia, which was undergoing the denazification process in the Soviet occupation zone in 1945.

== See also ==
- Joseph Musiol
- Silesian People's Party
- Józef Kożdoń
- Theofil Kupka
- Silesian Autonomy Movement

== Sources ==
- Stefan Pioskowik, Ewald Latacz (1885-1953). Ein Politiker in der Abstimmungzeit, Confinium – materiały do historii Górnego Śląska, 2/2007. ISBN 978-83-924291-8-0
- Oberschlesier, rettet Eucht selbst! Eine Streitschrift für ein freies und unteilbares Oberschlesien von Dr. Latacz – Geschäftsleiter des Bundes der Oberschlesier, Beuthen O/S 1921.
- Rudolf Vogel, Deutsche Presse und Propaganda des Abstimmungkampfes in Oberschlesien, Beuthen O.S. 1931.
- Edmund Klein, Miarodajne czynniki niemieckie a sprawa Górnego Śląska w grudniu 1918 roku, „Studia Śląskie” tom XIII, Opole 1968.
- Edmund Klein, Niemieckie plany separatystyczne na Śląsku w listopadzie i grudniu 1918, Prawo XXXIV, Wrocław 1971.
- Edmund Klein, Konferencja górnośląskich rad robotniczych i żołnierskich 22 listopada 1918 roku w Gliwicach (Podróż Hugona Haasego na Górny Śląsk), „Studia Śląskie” tom 23, Opole 1973.
- Edmund Klein, Niemieckie separatystyczne koncepcje na Śląsku w okresie konferencji wersalskiej, „Studia Śląskie” tom XXXV, Opole 1979.
- Piotr Dobrowolski, Ugrupowania i kierunki separatystyczne na Górnym Śląsku i w Cieszyńskiem w latach 1918–1939, Warszawa – Kraków 1972.
- Guido Hitze, Carl Ulitzka (1873-1953) oder Oberschlesien zwischen den Weltkriegen, Düsseldorf 2002.
- Andrea Schmidt-Rösler, Autonomie und Separatismusbestrebungen in Oberschlesien 1918–1922, „Zeitschrift für Ostmitteleuropa-Forschung” 48, 1999, 1, pp. 1–49.
