= Frydek =

- Village
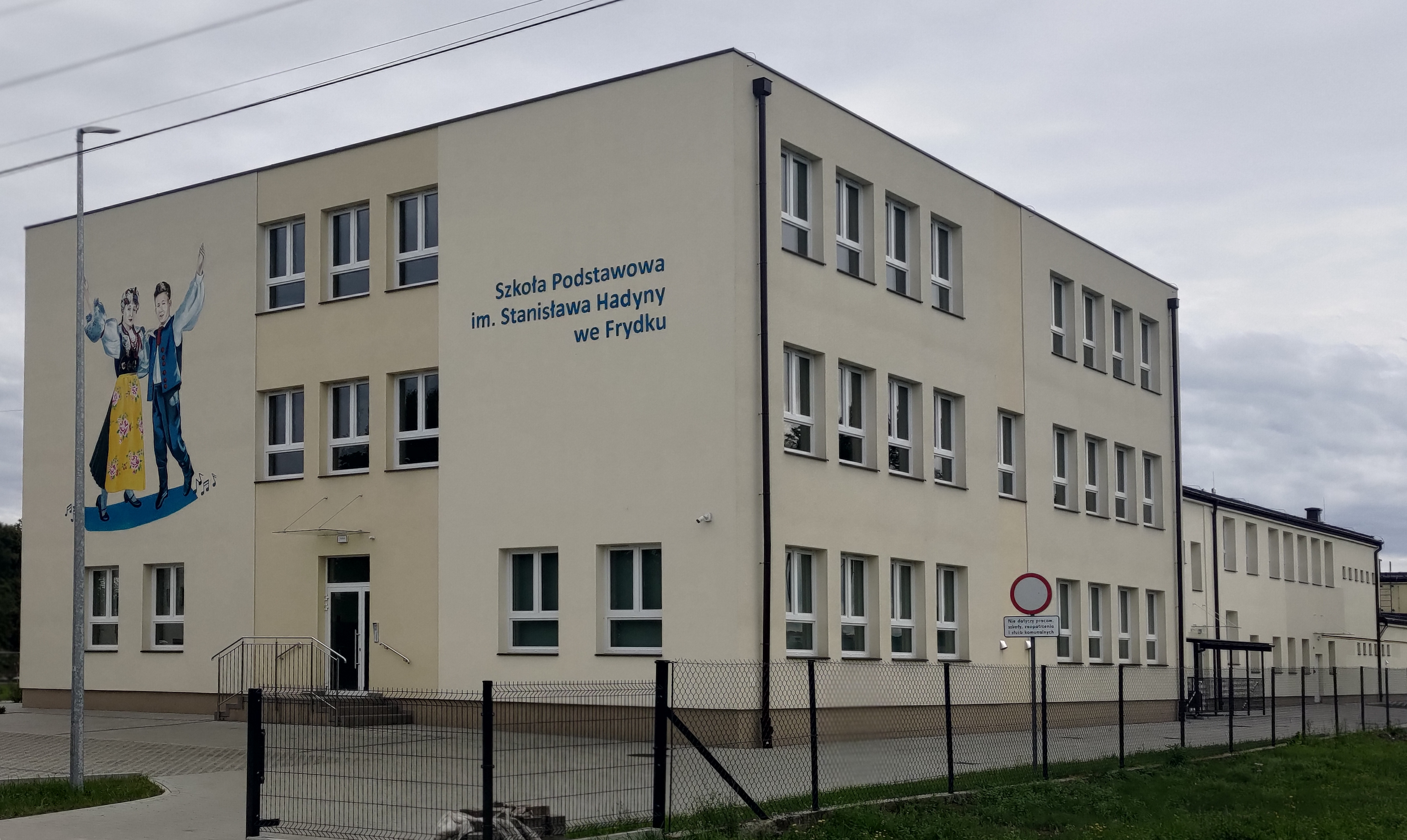
- School

- Location within Poland
- Coordinates: 49°55′N 19°5′E
- Country: Poland
- Voivodeship: Silesian
- County: Pszczyna
- Gmina: Miedźna
- Population: 1,020

Frydek [ˈfrɨdɛk] is a village in the administrative district of Gmina Miedźna, within Pszczyna County, Silesian Voivodeship, in southern Poland.
