= Knaj =

- Village
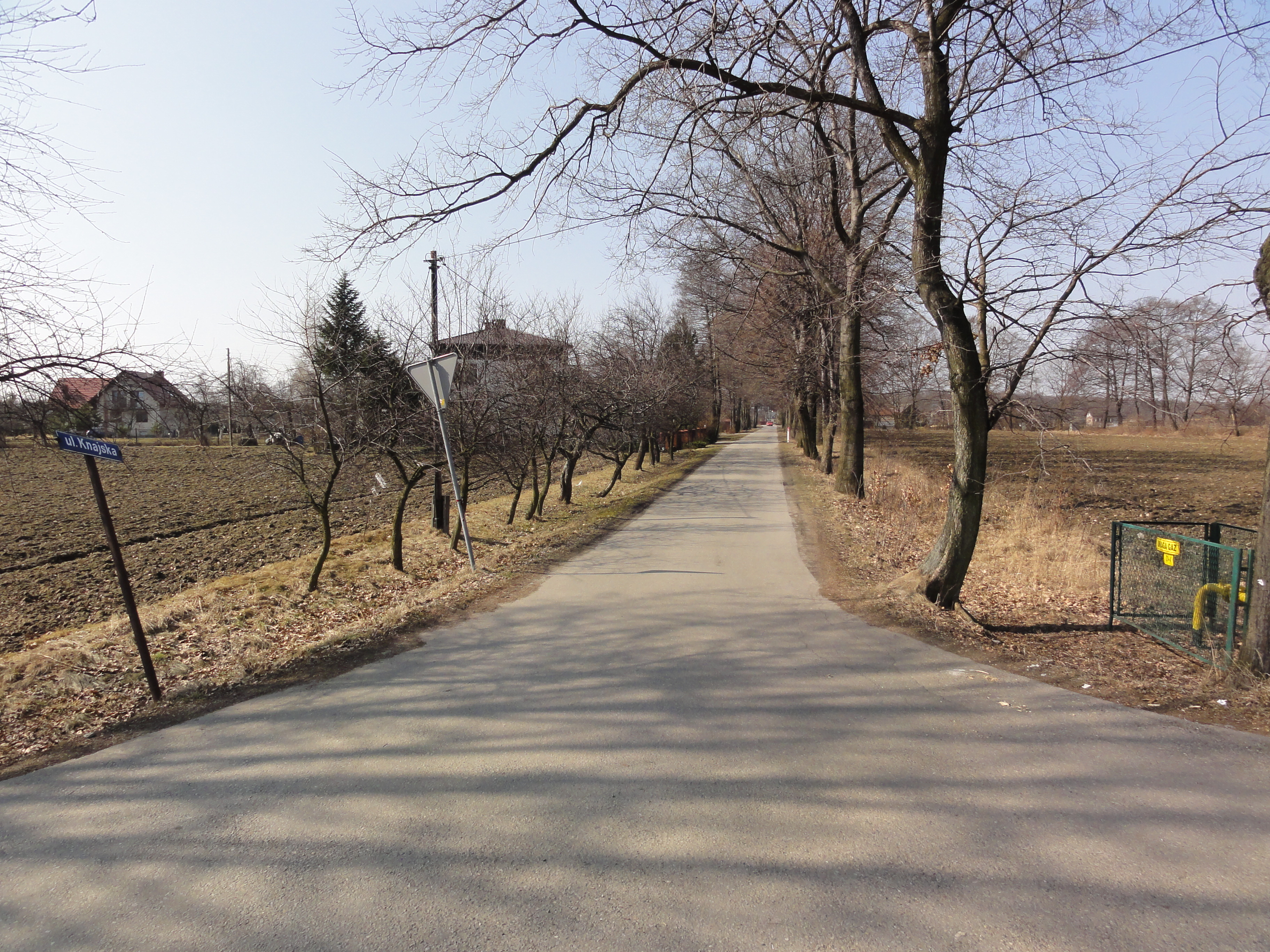
- Main street of the hamlet

- Location within Poland
- Coordinates: 49°52′32″N 18°43′51″E
- Country: Poland
- Voivodeship: Silesian
- County: Cieszyn
- Gmina: Strumień

Knaj [knai̯] is a hamlet of Drogomyśl in the administrative district of Gmina Strumień, within Cieszyn County, Silesian Voivodeship, in southern Poland. It lies approximately 7 kilometres (4 mi) south of Strumień, 16 km (10 mi) north-east of Cieszyn, and 46 km (29 mi) south-west of the regional capital Katowice.

The settlement originated as a folwark (German: vorwerk), mentioned in 1722 as zum vorwerg Knay. It lies on the Knajka stream and on the southern outskirts of Kniejski Las (lit. Knaj's Forest). All this names are derived from a word knieja denoting a wild, dense forest. In 1735 Knaj was adjoined to a Catholic parish in Pruchna. Later it became a part of the modern municipality of Drogomyśl.
