= Zabłocie, Silesian Voivodeship =

Zabłocie
- Village
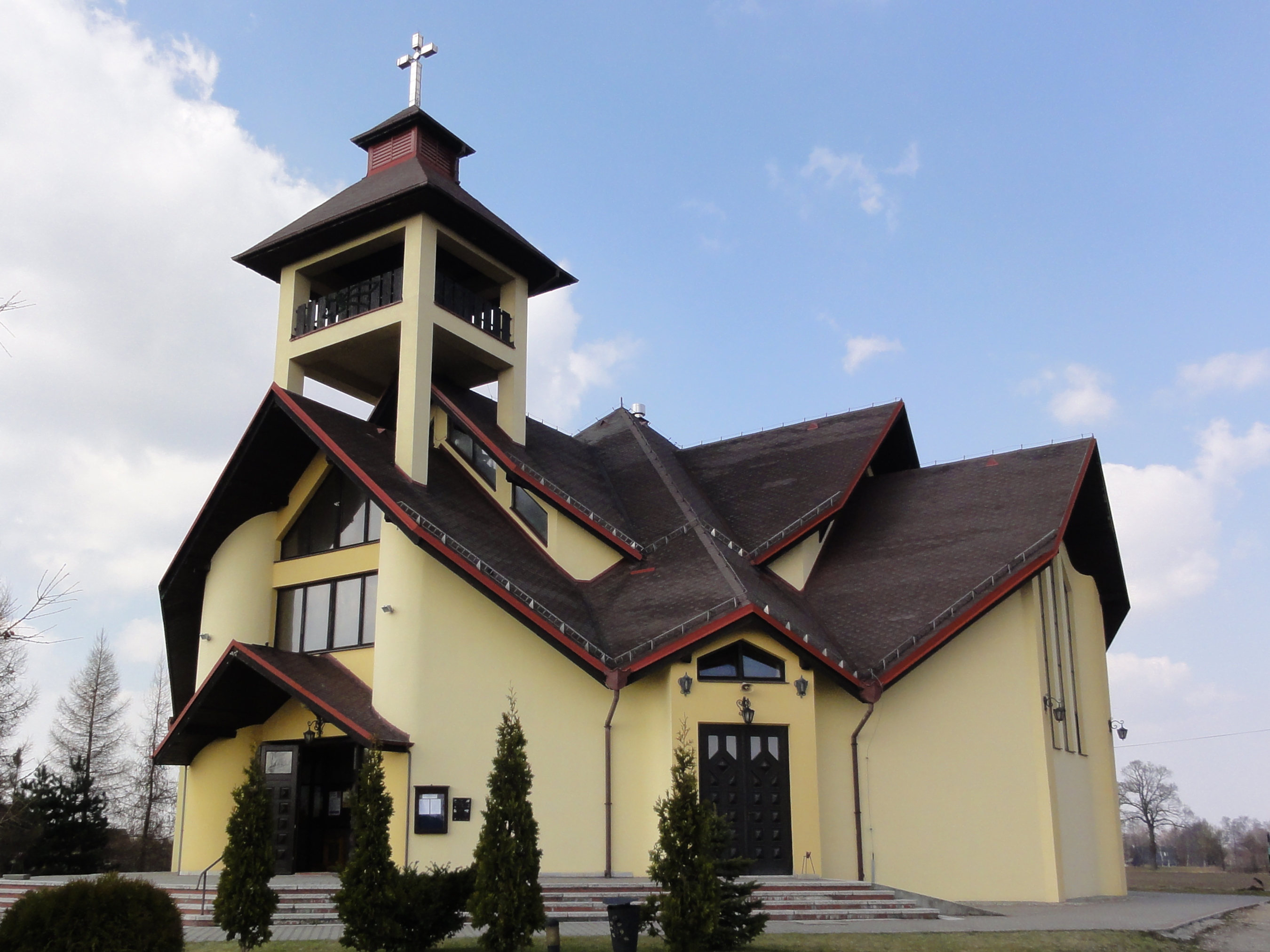
- Church of Our Lady of the Rosary

- Location within Poland
- Coordinates: 49°53′49.53″N 18°47′59.66″E
- Country: Poland
- Voivodeship: Silesian
- County: Cieszyn
- Gmina: Strumień
- First mentioned: 1486

Government
  - Mayor: Jarosław Szast

Area
  - Total: 19.03 km^{2} (7.35 sq mi)

Population (June 2008)
  - Total: 1,312
  - Density: 68.94/km^{2} (178.6/sq mi)
- Time zone: UTC+1 (CET)
  - Summer (DST): UTC+2 (CEST)
- Postal code: 43-246
- Car plates: SCI

Zabłocie [zaˈbwɔt͡ɕɛ] is a village in Gmina Strumień, Cieszyn County, Silesian Voivodeship, southern Poland. It has a population of 1,312 (2008) and an area of 1,903 km^{2} (735 sq mi). It lies in the historical region of Cieszyn Silesia.

== Etymology ==
The name is of topographic origin and literally means [a place] behind a mud (Polish: za błotem, whereas błoto means mud).

== History ==
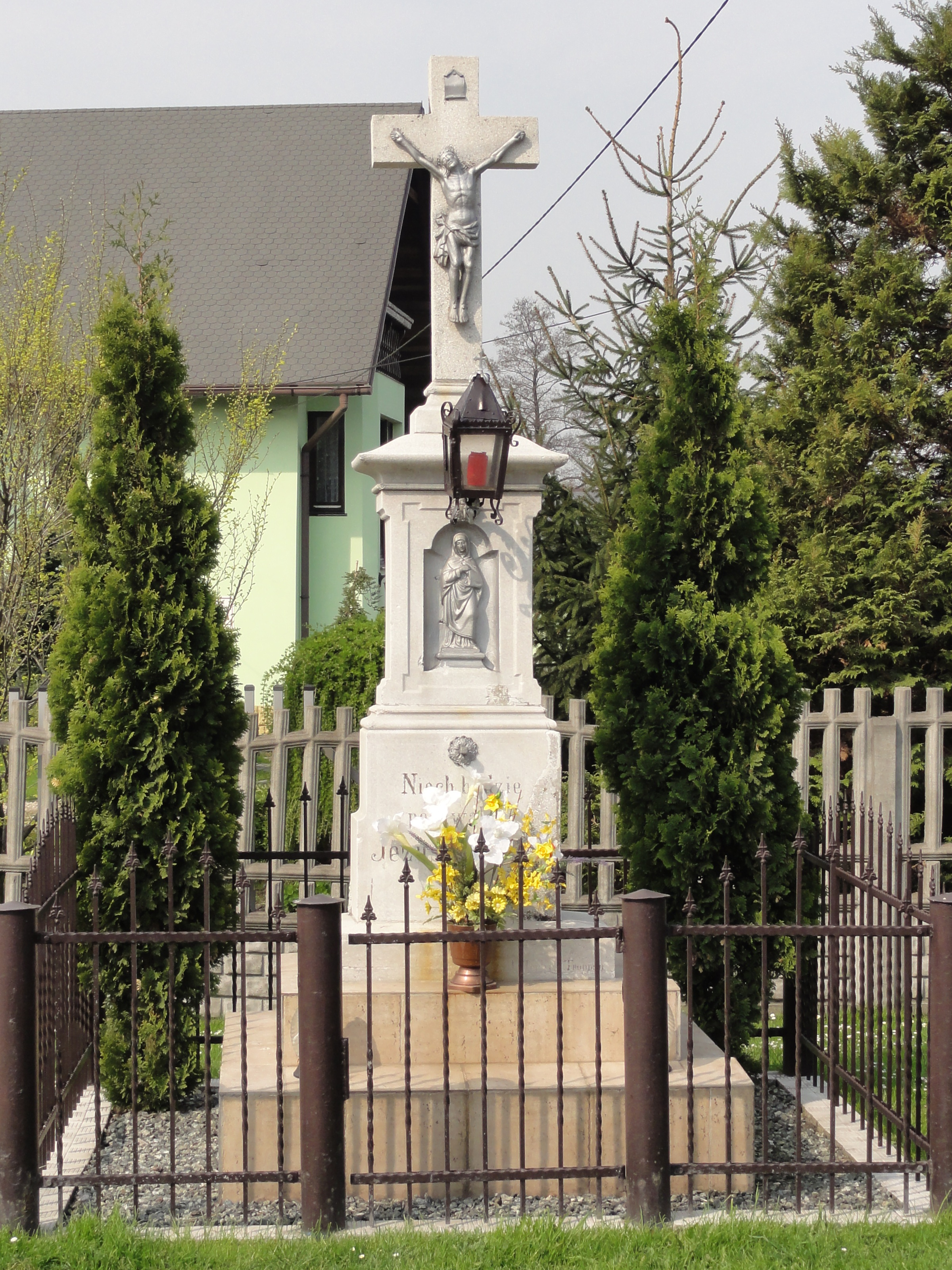
Old wayside cross

The area became part of the emerging Polish state in the 10th century, and after its fragmentation into smaller duchies it formed part of the duchies of Silesia, Opole and Racibórz and Cieszyn, remaining under the rule of the Piast dynasty. The village was first mentioned in 1486. It was later mentioned as Zablaty (1504), Zablatie (1515), Zablati (1621) and so on. Politically the village belonged then to the Duchy of Cieszyn, which by then became a fee of the Kingdom of Bohemia, which after 1526 became part of the Habsburg monarchy.

In years 1573/1577–1594 it belonged to Skoczów-Strumień state country that was split from the Duchy of Cieszyn but was later purchased back. Later it also belonged to Teschener Kammer.

After Revolutions of 1848 in the Austrian Empire a modern municipal division was introduced in the re-established Austrian Silesia. The village as a municipality was subscribed to the political district of Bielsko and the legal district of Strumień. According to the censuses conducted in 1880, 1890, 1900 and 1910 the population of the municipality grew from 763 in 1880 to 917 in 1910 with a majority being native Polish-speakers (98.5%-99%) accompanied by a small German-speaking minority (at most 11 or 1.5% in 1880) and Czech-speaking (at most 5 or 0.6% in 1890), in terms of religion in 1910 majority were Roman Catholics (98.5%), followed by 8 Jews and 6 Protestants.

After World War I, fall of Austria-Hungary, Polish–Czechoslovak War and the division of Cieszyn Silesia in 1920, it became again a part of Poland. It was then annexed by Nazi Germany at the beginning of World War II. After the war it was restored to Poland.
