= Valerianus Magnus =

Italian monk, missionary and writer

The Reverend Valerianus Magnus OFMCap
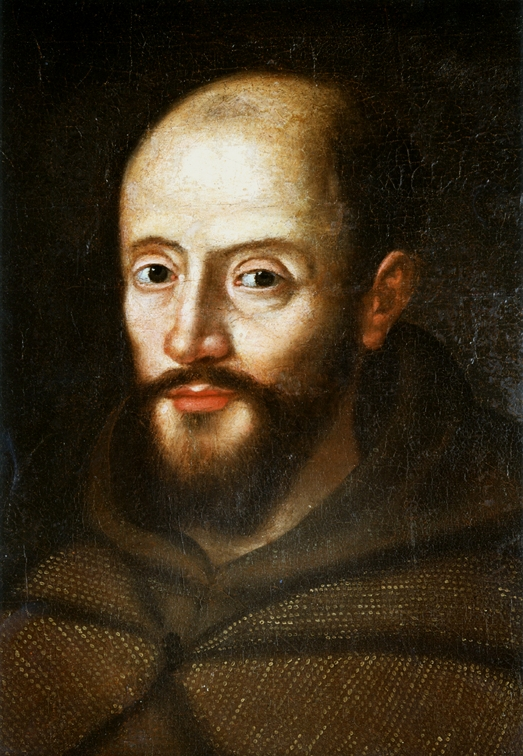
- Valerianus Magnus, about 1624, National Museum, Warsaw
- Born: Massimiliano Magni; 11 October 1587; Milan, Duchy of Milan
- Died: 29 July 1661 (aged 73); Salzburg, Archduchy of Austria
- Parent(s): Costantino Magni and Ottavia Magni (née Carcassola)

Education
- Education: Charles University

Philosophical work
- Era: 17th-century philosophy
- Region: Western philosophy; Italian philosophy
- School: Augustinianism
- Main interests: Metaphysics, physics, natural philosophy

Valerianus Magnus or Valeriano Magni OFMCap (October 11, 1586 – July 20, 1661) was an Italian Capuchin, missionary preacher in Central Europe, philosopher, polemicist and author. He was one of the pioneers with the Torricelli's experiment and published one of the first accounts of it, the Demonstratio ocularis (Warsaw, 1647).

== Biography ==
Valeriano was born in Milan on 11 October 1586. His father, Costantino Magni came from an ancient and noble Italian family. At the age of two, Magni was taken by his parents from Italy to Prague. As a young man, Magni entered the Capuchin Order in Prague. He spent his first years as lector, and soon gained a great reputation as a preacher. In 1624 he was appointed Franciscan provincial of Bohemia and two years later he was named Prefect and Apostolic Vicar of the church's mission to Poland, Bohemia, Hungary, and Germany. He collaborated with various papal diplomats, particularly with the apostolic nuncios Pier Luigi Carafa in Cologne, Giovanni Battista Maria Pallotta, Ciriaco Rocci and Malatesta Baglioni in the Archduchy of Austria; Onorato Visconti, Mario Filonardi and Giovanni de Torres in the Polish–Lithuanian Commonwealth. His activity is documented by a large collection of letters preserved in various European archives.

Magni was greatly respected by Holy Roman Emperors Ferdinand II and Ferdinand III, as well as by King Władysław IV Vasa, who employed him on several diplomatic missions. In July 1647 he performed a vacuum experiment (so-called Torricelli's experiment) before a distinguished audience at the Royal Castle in Warsaw. The publication of the experiment aroused great controversy in 1640s. The conversion of the Calvinist theologian Bartholomaeus Nigrinus, who was appointed confidential secretary to Władysław IV, was certainly a result of his influence, and it strengthened the Catholic party in Poland. Władysław IV solicited a cardinal's hat for Magni, but the opposition of the Jesuits prevented his elevation to the cardinalate.

Magni was very close to the Archbishop of Prague, Ernst Adalbert von Harrach. Landgrave Ernst of Hesse, who had been converted at Vienna on 6 January 1652, and who knew Father Valeriano, summoned Capuchins to St. Goar on the Rhine, and was present at the religious disputation between Valeriano and Peter Haberkorn of Giessen held at Burg Rheinfels in 1651. Magni had a long-standing feud with the Jesuits, against whom he harbored a strong aversion. It was by his advice that pope Urban VIII abolished the Jesuitesses in 1631. On the appearance of his pamphlet Contra imposturas Jesuitarum in 1659, he was summoned to appear before the papal court. As he did not obey the summons he was arrested in Vienna at the instance of the nuncio, but Ferdinand III's intervention secured his release.

He then moved to Salzburg, where he remained for the rest of his life. He died on 29 July 1661, aged 73.

== Selected works ==
Magni acquired great reputation in the seventeenth century by his polemical writings against the Protestants, and philosophical ones against Aristotelianism. Magni was a vehement anti-Aristotelian and an admirer of Galileo and Descartes. He is referred to approvingly in the fifteenth of Pascal's Lettres provinciales and one of his Apologetical Letters may be found in the collection entitled Tuba magna, tom. II. Cuthbert of Brighton considers Magni "the greatest and most vigorous of the Capuchin scholastic thinkers formed in the Bonaventuran tradition." His most important writings are:

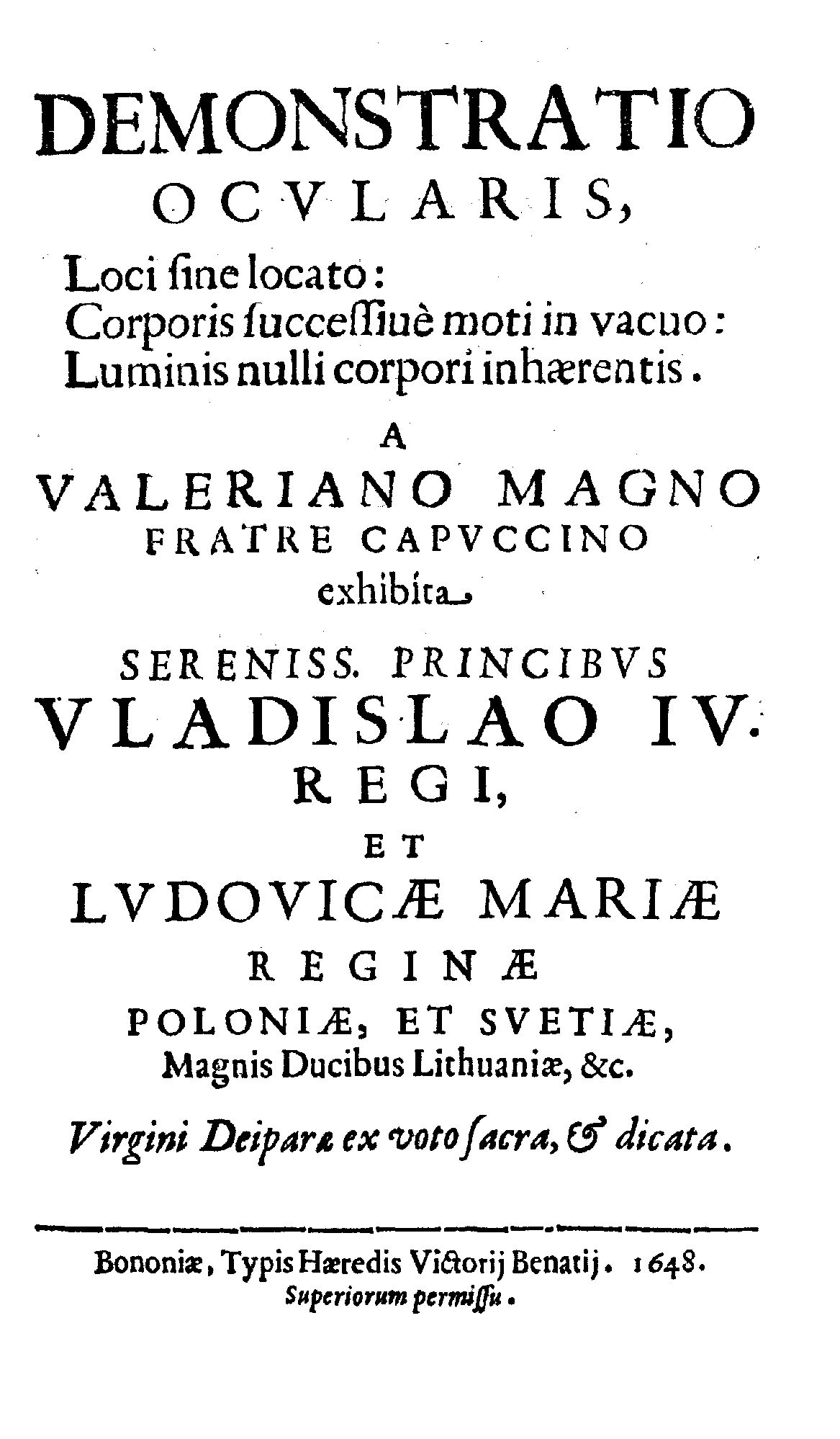
Demonstratio ocularis, loci sine locato, corporis successive moti in vacuo, luminis nulli corpori inhaerentis, 1648

- Judicium de catholicorum et acatholicorum regula credendi, 1628, 1641.
- De luce mentium, 1642.
- Organum theologicum, 1643.
- Methodus convincendi et revocandi haereticos, 1643.
- Echo Absurditatum Ulrici de Neufeld Blesa, 1646.
- Demonstratio ocularis, loci sine locato, corporis successive moti in vacuo, luminis nulli corpori inhaerentis (in Latin). Bologna: eredi Vittorio Benacci. 1648. The Demonstratio ocularis was the first printed record of the Torricelli's experiment.
- Principia et specimen philosophiae, 1652.
- Acta disputationis habitae Rheinfelsae apud S. Goarem, 1652.
- Epistola de quaestione utrum Primatus Rom. Pontificis ..., 1653.
- Commentarius de homine infami personato sub titulis Iocosi Severi Medii, 1654.
- Concussio fundamentorum ecclesiae catholicae, iactata ab Herm. Conringi ..., 1654.
- Conringiana concussio Sanctissimi in Christo papae catholici retorta ..., 1654.
- Epistola ... de responsione H. Conringii, 1654.
- Epistola Valeriani Magni Fratris Capucini ..., 1654.
- Opus philosophicum, 1660
- Apologia contra imposturas Jesuitarum, 1661.
- Christiana et catholica defensio adversus Societatem Jesu, 1661.

== Sources ==
- This article incorporates text from a publication now in the public domain: Herbermann, Charles, ed. (1913). "Valerianus Magnus". Catholic Encyclopedia. New York: Robert Appleton Company.
- Picinelli, Filippo (1670). Ateneo dei letterati milanesi. Milan: Francesco Vigone. pp. 509–10.
- Argelati, Filippo (1745). Bibliotheca scriptorum mediolanensium. Vol. 2. Milan. pp. 833–8.
- Chalmers, Alexander (1815). "Magni, Valerian". General Biographical Dictionary. Vol. 21. London: J. Nichols. p. 113. This article incorporates text from this source, which is in the public domain.
- Rose, Paul Lawrence (1974). "Magni, Valeriano". In C.C. Gilespie (ed.). Dictionary of Scientific Biography. Vol. 9. New York: Charles Scribner's Sons. pp. 15–17.
- Vasoli, Cesare (1980). "Note sulle idee filosofiche di Valeriano Magni". Italia, Venezia e Polonia tra medio evo e età moderna. Florence: Leo S. Olschki: 79–112. ISBN 8822229681.
- Miller, L. (2003). "Magni, Valeriano". New Catholic Encyclopedia. Vol. 9 (2 ed.). Detroit: Thomson-Gale. p. 43.
- Di Napoli, Alfredo (2015). Valeriano Magni da Milano e la riforma ecclesiastica in Boemia attraverso la corrispondenza della Congregazione de Propaganda Fide (1626-1651). Edizioni Biblioteca Francescana. ISBN 9788879622370.
- Catalano, Alessandro (2020). "VALERIANO da Milano". Dizionario Biografico degli Italiani (in Italian). Vol. 98: Valeriani–Verra. Rome: Institute of the Italian Encyclopaedia. ISBN 978-88-12-00032-6.
- Favaretti Camposampiero, Matteo (2024). "Leibniz e Valeriano Magni". In Roberto Palaia (ed.). Leibniz e l'Italia. Atti delle giornate di studio, Roma, Villa Mirafiori, 28-29 novembre 2019. Florence: Leo S. Olschki. pp. 17–40. doi:10.1400/298799.
