= Battle of Oświęcim (1866) =

1866 battle

- Part of the Austro-Prussian War
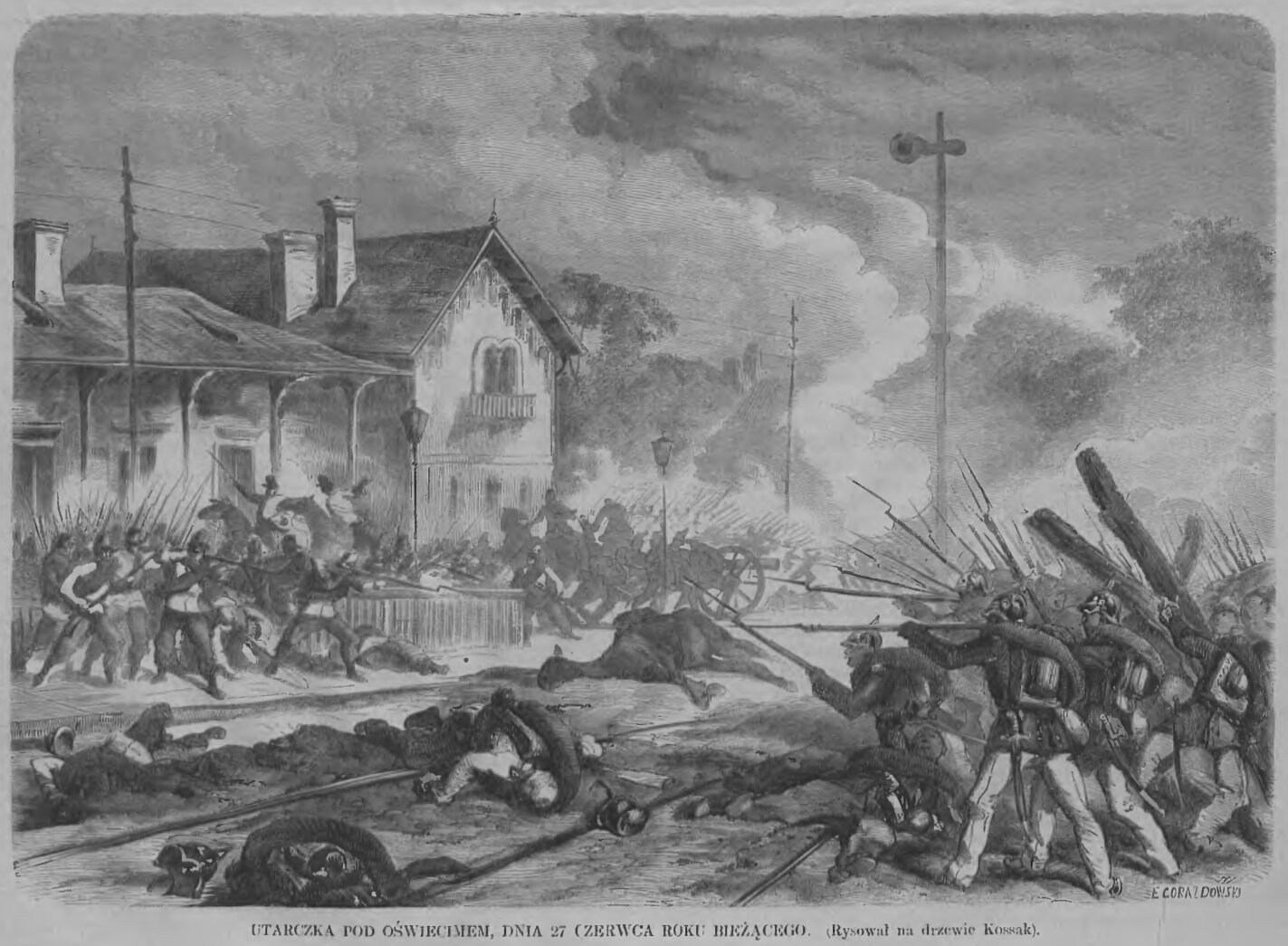
- Skirmish at Oświęcim on 27 June of this year (illustration by J. Kossak in Polish magazine Tygodnik Illustrowany, 21 July 1866)
Date	27 June 1866
Location	Oświęcim, Bohemia (nowadays Poland)
Result	Austrian victory

Belligerents
Prussia	Austria

Commanders and leaders
(Kingdom of Prussia) Wilhelm zu Stolberg-Wernigerode	(Austrian Empire) Johann von Trentinaglia; Friedrich von Ziegler und Klipphausen

Strength
3000−4000 men	?

Casualties and losses
172 killed, wounded or missing	?

The Battle of Oświęcim was a minor engagement during the Austro-Prussian War on its Northern Front on 27 June 1866 near the town Oświęcim, at the former border area between Austrian and Prussian part of Silesia. Prussian forces attacking the Oświęcim railway station and close by area were repulsed by the Austrian infantry and cavalry units, which meant one of the very few military successes of the Austrian Empire in this war. The event also remained as only significant military action of the war on the soil of modern-day Poland.

== Background ==
As the main conflict erupted mainly at the fronts in Bohemia and Bavaria, the Austro-Prussian border in Upper Silesia appeared as a calm section of an eventual war front. However, on June 21, 1866, General Wilhelm zu Stolberg-Wernigerode, stationed with his detachment on the border near Oświęcim, received orders for his men to destroy the railway viaducts at Pruchna, Bohumín and Nowy Bieruń in order to break the vital Austrian railway line from Kraków to Olomouc.

Compeleting those tasks on June 22, on June 26 afternoon Stolberg detachment received orders from Prussian High Command to conduct a thorough reconnaissance mission across the Vistula River, to ascertain the strength of the Austrian forces stationed at Oświęcim, and also to deceive the enemy about the perception of the East Bohemian campaign being the main Prussian direction of attack. Stolberg, already preparing his plan for such a mission, got reinforced by 10th and 11th Fusilier companies from the 62nd Regiment and also some Silesian homeguard volunteers (Landwehr), and ordered his men to get on the move.

The defence of this part of West Gallicia was entrusted to the Austrian brigade of Major-General Johann von Trentinaglia, consisting of four battalions, the 1st Lancer Regiment (Count Grünne), and a rifled 4-pounder battery of 4th Artillery Regiment, along the frontier from Mysłowice to Oświęcim. The troops at the latter place were commanded by Colonel Friedrich von Ziegler.

== Battle ==
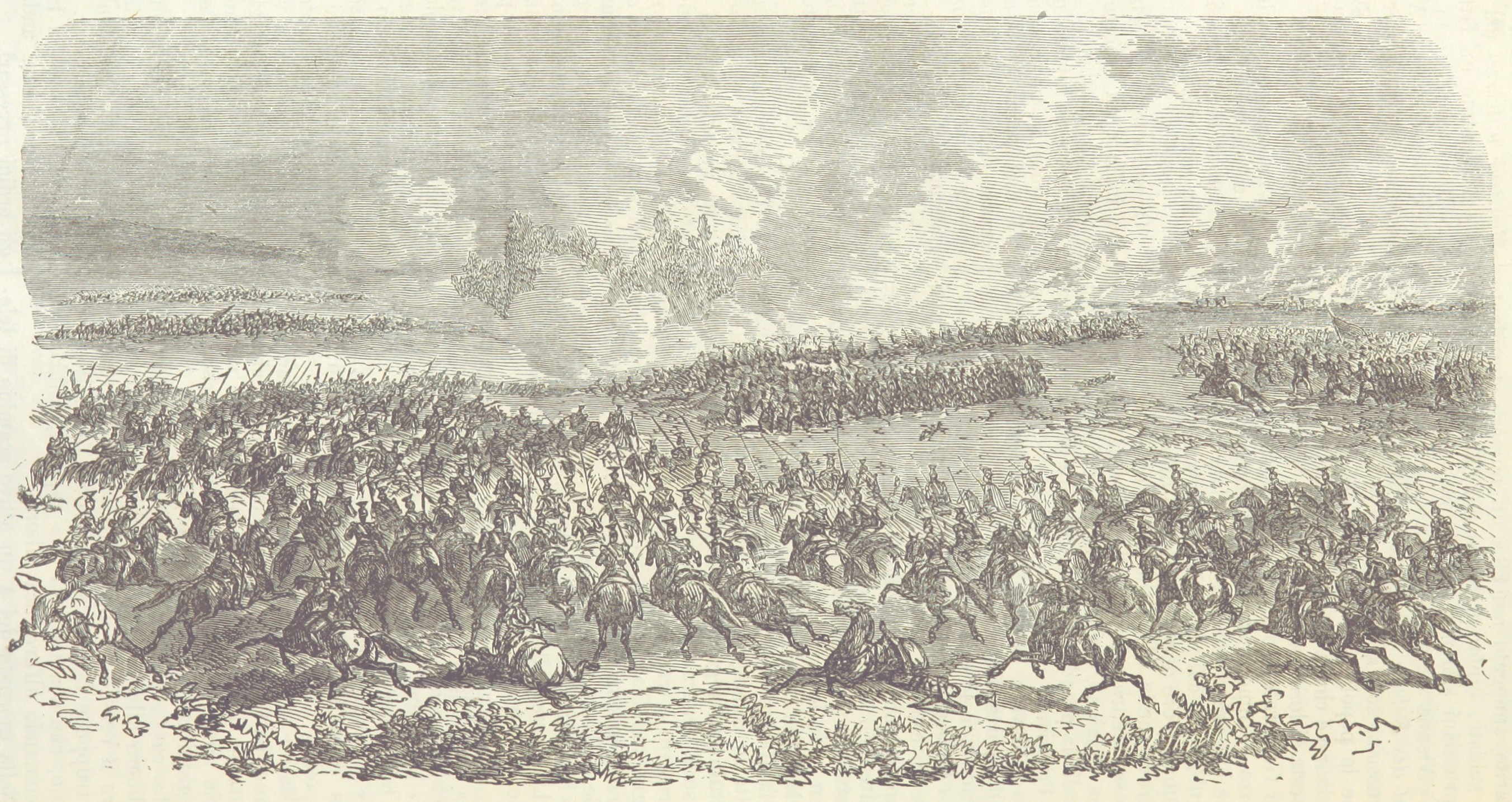
Cavalry battle outside of town (Album della guerra del 1866, 1867)

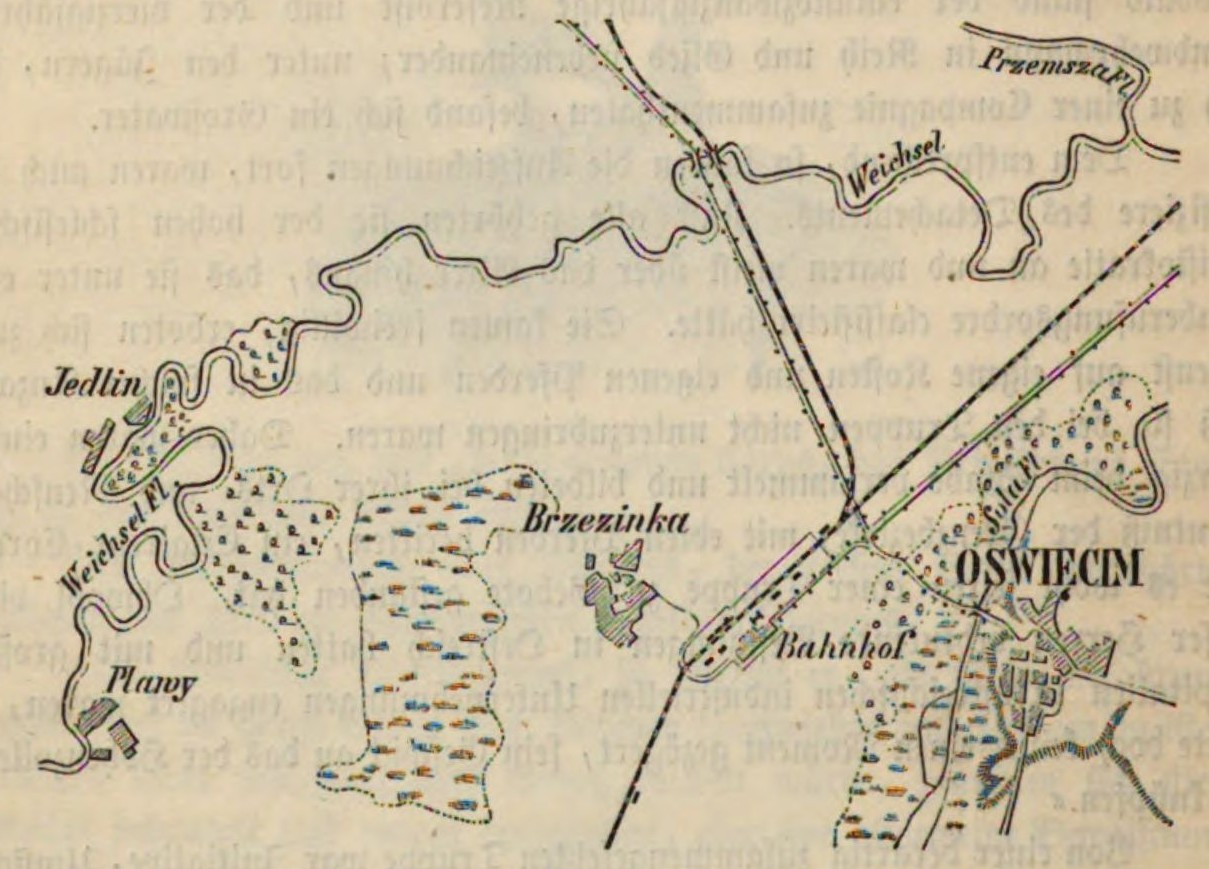
Map of the Oświęcim battlefield (1871)

Prussian forces assembled near Nicolai on the afternoon of June 26 in a total streigh of about three of four thousand men and advanced to the border later that same day. The battalions, some traveling by wagons, took different routes with a general rendezvous point in Jedlina (Jedl) Forest. At 4:00 a.m. on the 27th, the detachment, consisting of five battalions, the two Fusilier companies, the Landwehr Uhlan Regiment, and two cannons, set out from the forest, in two collums again. The 11th Company of the 62nd Regiment, under Captain von Calliat, the Landwehr Battalion Osten Sacken, the Uhlan Regiment, and the two cannons advanced at Pławy, while the 10th Company of the 62nd Regiment under Captain Count Königsdorff and the Landwehr Battalions von Bessel, von Kleist, and von Schmidt advanced via Brzezinka village towards Oświęcim. Rest of the Prussian forces stayed in their position on the Vistula River to protect cover.

In the morning of June 27 the 10th Company of the 62nd Regiment, led by Captain Königsdorff, reached the houses of Brzezinka village, north-west from Oświęcim, and took it after a short skirmish. Surprised Austrian forces of the 57th Infantry Regiment retreated on the site of Oświęcim train station, positioned in Brzezinka direction from the town and prepared their defence here. Meanwhile, incoming units of the Prussian 62nd Regiment supported by artillery fire from two cannons, initiated the attack at the station defended by approximately by three battalions of the Trentinaglia Brigade. Heavy fighting occurred mainly for the railway restaurant hall.

After a few hours of the battle at the station, Austrian forces got reinforced by the two squadrons of the 1st Uhlans Regiment, under the command of Captain Maurice von Lehman, deployed from Rajsko. Prussian commander von Busse led the repulsive attack with some forces detached from the attacking of the station, but they were not able to push the Austrians away, despite the death of Austrian commander von Lehman. Under fire from the infantry at the station building and incomong Uhlan regiment, at 8:30 a.m. Prussian commanders ordered to disengage from the retreat their units and retreat back towards Nicolai.

== Afterwards ==
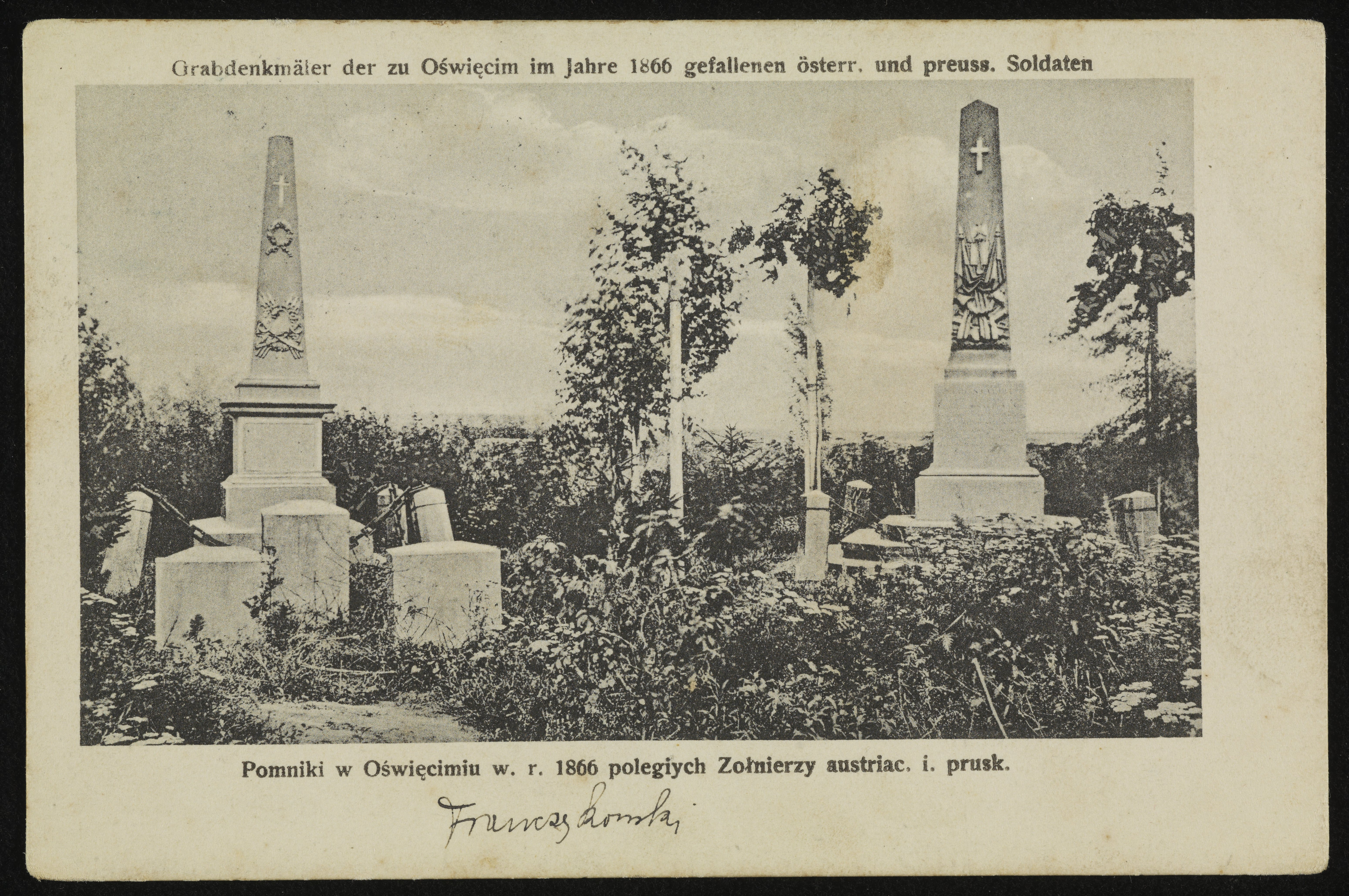
Austrian (left) and Prussian memorials at the Oświęcim parish cemetery (c. 1900 photograph)

Prussians counted their casualties on 172 men killed, wounded or missing.

Ethnical Poles fought on the both hostile sides.

Oświęcim military affair, staying out of the main war fronts of the 1866 conflict, remains strategically marginal event. Upper Silesian border did not experience any further major military operations following an early end of hostilities in July 1866. Although, on July 15 another skirmish between both sides occurred at the area, this time in a much smaller scale.

== Memory ==
At Oświęcim parish cemetery, two marble obelisks were erected in 1867, each commemorating the fallen of both the Austrian and Prussian side.

== Bibliography ==
- Geoffrey Wawro, The Austro-Prussian War. Austria's war with Prussia and Italy in 1866 (New York, 2007).
