= Zbytków =

- Village
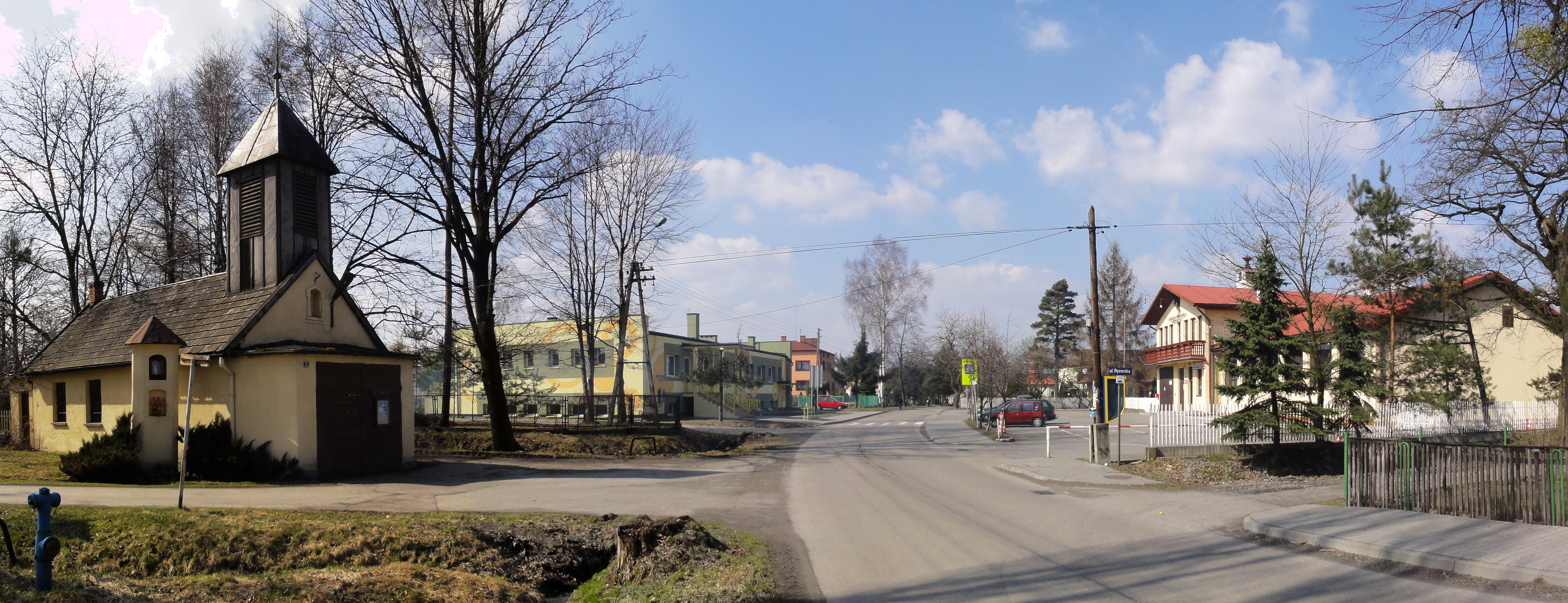
- Village's centre

- Location within Poland
- Coordinates: 49°55′23.33″N 18°43′41.78″E
- Country: Poland
- Voivodeship: Silesian
- County: Cieszyn
- Gmina: Strumień
- First mentioned: 1388

Government
  - Mayor: Bogusław Wawrzyczek

Area
  - Total: 4.94 km^{2} (1.91 sq mi)

Population (June 2008)
  - Total: 1,262
  - Density: 255/km^{2} (662/sq mi)
- Time zone: UTC+1 (CET)
  - Summer (DST): UTC+2 (CEST)
- Postal code: 43-246
- Car plates: SCI
- Website: Official website

Zbytków [ˈzbɨtkuf] is a village in Gmina Strumień, Cieszyn County, Silesian Voivodeship, southern Poland. It has a population of 1,262 (June 2008). It lies in the historical region of Cieszyn Silesia.

The name of the village is derived from personal name Zbytek.

== History ==
The village was first mentioned in 1388. Politically the village belonged initially to the Duchy of Teschen, formed in 1290 in the process of feudal fragmentation of Poland and was ruled by a local branch of Piast dynasty. In 1327 the duchy became a fee of Kingdom of Bohemia, which after 1526 became part of the Habsburg monarchy. In 1561 the village (Zbytkow) was bought by a town of Strumień. In years 1573/1577–1594 it belonged to Skoczów-Strumień state country that was split from the Duchy of Teschen but was later purchased back. Later it belonged to Teschener Kammer.

After Revolutions of 1848 in the Austrian Empire a modern municipal division was introduced in the re-established Austrian Silesia. The village as a municipality was subscribed to the political district of Bielsko and the legal district of Strumień. According to the censuses conducted in 1880, 1890, 1900 and 1910 the population of the municipality grew from 305 in 1880 to 368 in 1910 with a dwindling majority being native Polish-speakers (98% in 1880, 100% in 1890 and 1900 and dropping to 92.1% in 1910) accompanied by a growing small German-speaking minority (peaking at number 25 or 7.9% in 1910), in terms of religion in 1910 majority were Roman Catholics (88.3%), followed by Protestants (8.9%) and Jews (10 or 2.8%).

After World War I, fall of Austria-Hungary, Polish–Czechoslovak War and the division of Cieszyn Silesia in 1920, it became a part of Poland. It was then annexed by Nazi Germany at the beginning of World War II. After the war it was restored to Poland.
