= Lipowiec, Ustroń =

Lipowiec
- Osiedle of Ustroń
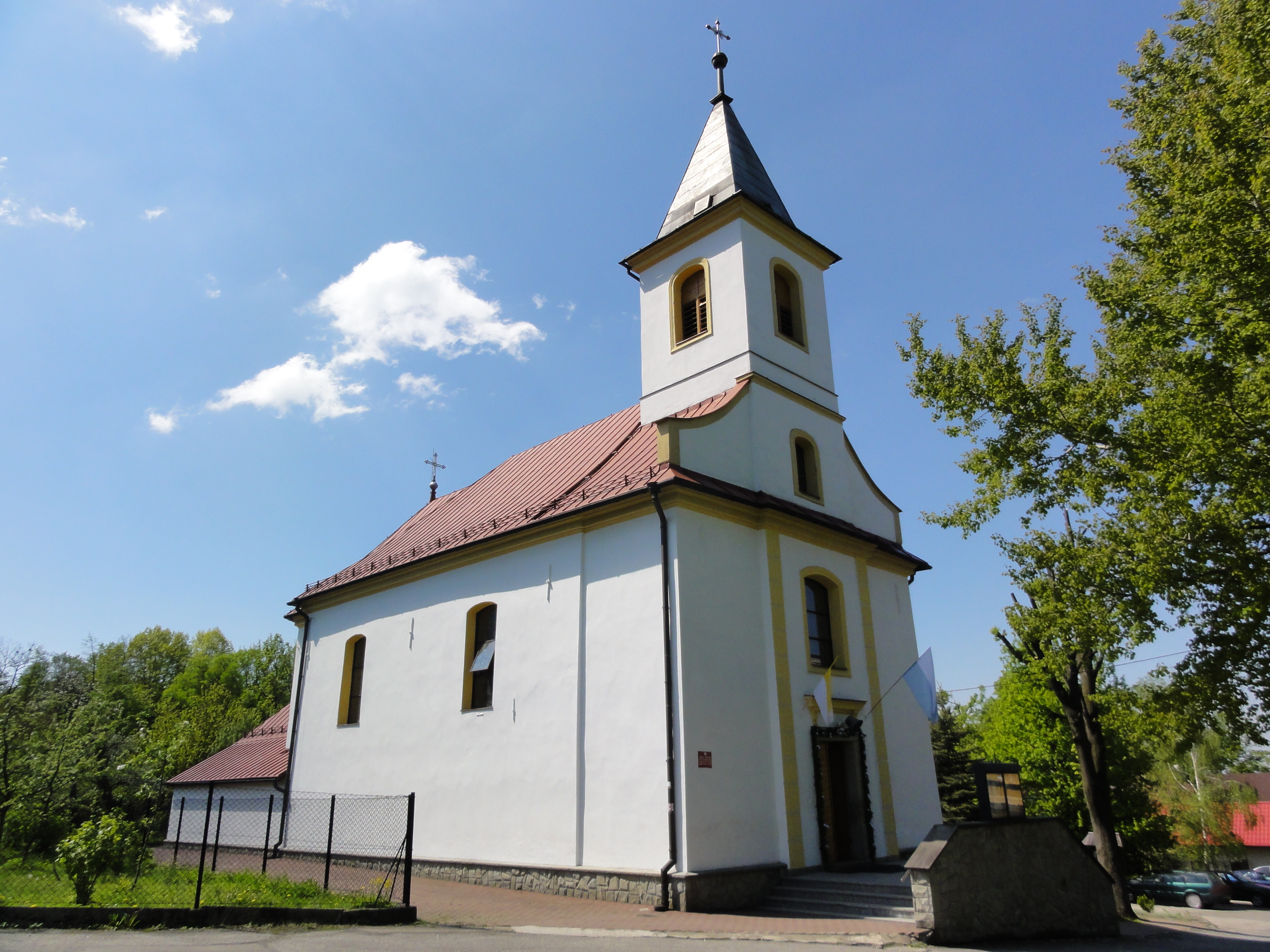
- Exaltation of the Holy Cross Church
- Interactive map of Lipowiec
- Coordinates: 49°44′55.7″N 18°49′58.9″E
- Country: Poland
- Voivodeship: Silesian
- County: Cieszyn
- Time zone: UTC+1 (CET)
  - Summer (DST): UTC+2 (CEST)
- Area code: (+48) 033

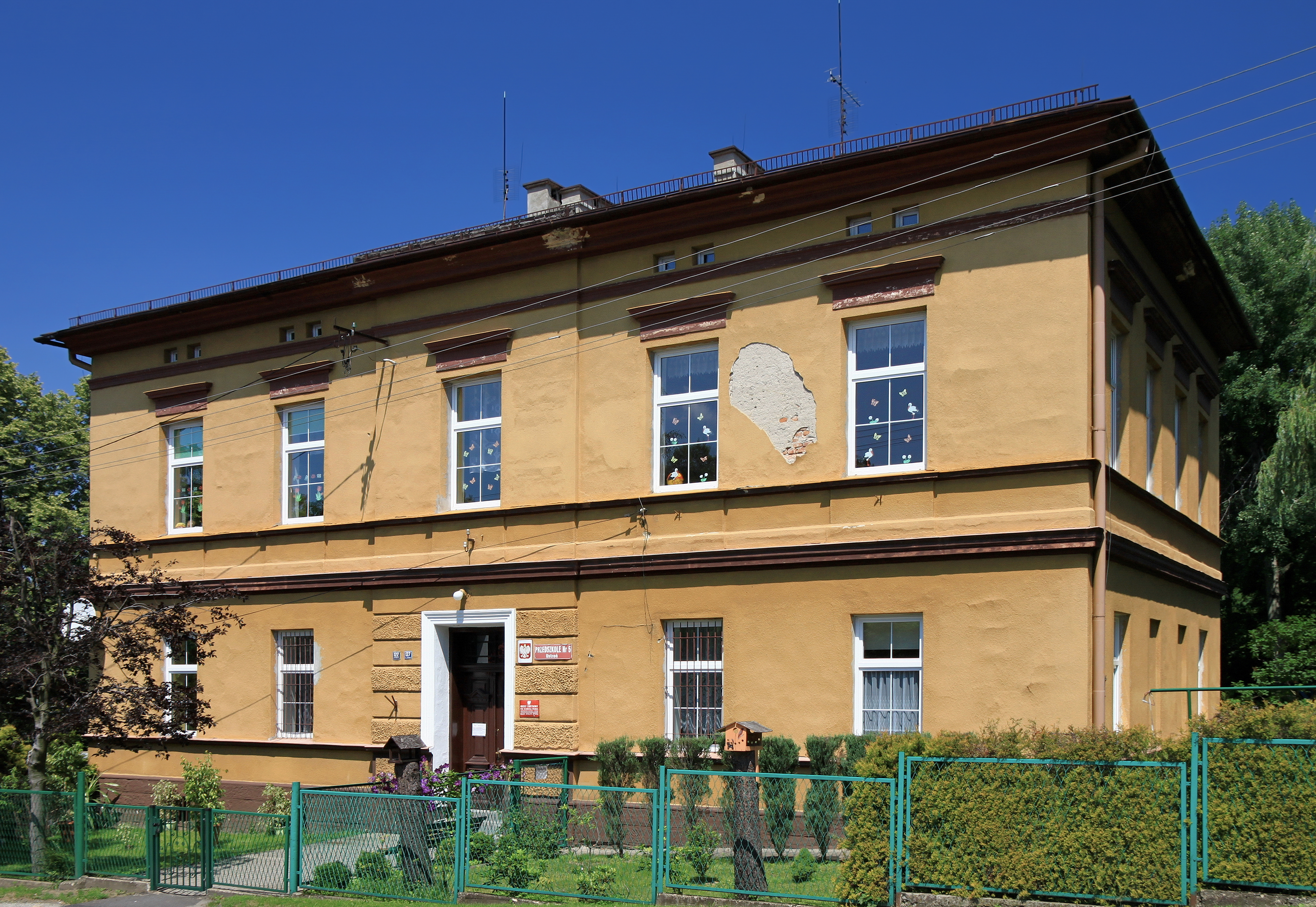
Former rectory, now kindergarten

Lipowiec is a district (osiedle) of Ustroń, Silesian Voivodeship, Poland. It was a separate municipality, but became administratively a part of Ustroń on January 1, 1973.

== History ==
The village was first mentioned in a Latin document of Diocese of Wrocław called Liber fundationis episcopatus Vratislaviensis from around 1305 as item in Lypowetz. It meant that the village was in the process of location (the size of land to pay a tithe from was not yet precised). The creation of the village was a part of a larger settlement campaign taking place in the late 13th century on the territory of what will be later known as Upper Silesia.

Politically, the village belonged initially to the Duchy of Teschen, formed in 1290 in the process of the feudal fragmentation of Poland and was ruled by a local branch of Piast dynasty. In 1327, the duchy became a fee of the Kingdom of Bohemia, which became part of the Habsburg monarchy after 1526.

The village became a seat of a Catholic parish, first mentioned in an incomplete register of Peter's Pence payment from 1335 as Lipovecz and as such being one of the oldest in the region. However local parish quickly ceased to exist and was not mentioned among local parishes in 1447.

In the years 1573/1577–1594, it belonged to Skoczów-Strumień state country that was split from the Duchy of Teschen but was later purchased back. Since 1653, it belonged to Teschener Kammer.

After the revolutions of 1848 in the Austrian Empire, a modern municipal division was introduced in the re-established Austrian Silesia. The village as a municipality was subscribed to the political district of Bielsko and the legal district of Skoczów. According to the censuses conducted in 1880, 1890, 1900 and 1910 the population of the municipality grew from 936 in 1880 to 961 in 1910, with majority of the inhabitants being native Polish-speakers (98.5%–99.9%) and a small German-speaking minority (most 12 or 1.3% in 1880) and at most two people Czech-speaking (in 1880 and 1890), in terms of religion majority were Roman Catholics (88.2% in 1910), followed by Protestants (11.6% in 1910) and Jews (2 people). The village was also traditionally inhabited by Cieszyn Vlachs, speaking Cieszyn Silesian dialect.

After World War I, the fall of Austria-Hungary, the Polish–Czechoslovak War and the division of Cieszyn Silesia in 1920, it became a part of Poland. It was then annexed by Nazi Germany at the beginning of World War II. After the war, it was restored to Poland.
