= Drogomyśl =

- Village
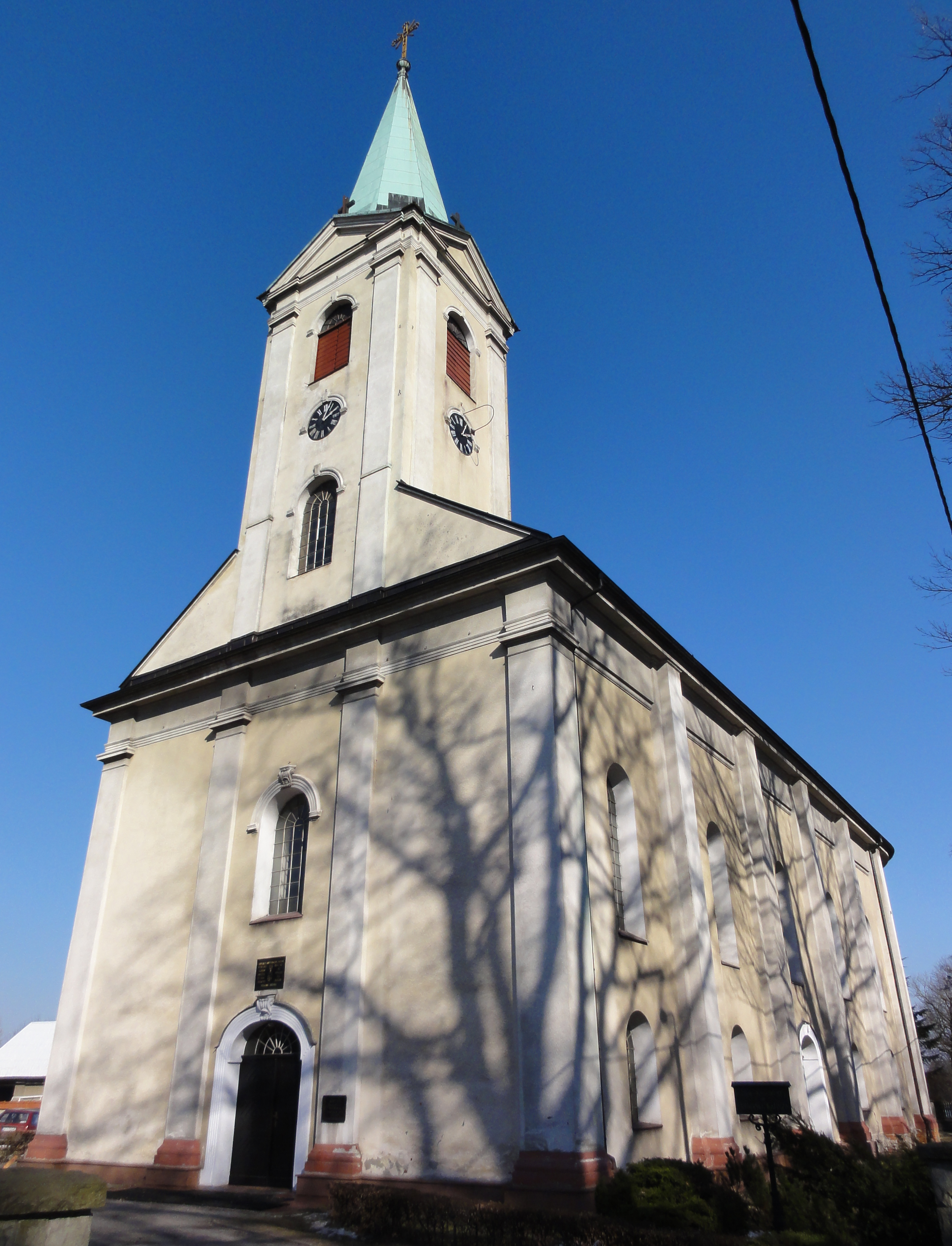
- Lutheran church in Drogomyśl

- Coat of arms

- Location within Poland
- Coordinates: 49°52′9.53″N 18°45′24.13″E
- Country: Poland
- Voivodeship: Silesian
- County: Cieszyn
- Gmina: Strumień
- First mentioned: 1452

Government
  - Mayor: Zbigniew Podyma

Area
  - Total: 14.65 km^{2} (5.66 sq mi)

Population (June 2008)
  - Total: 2,121
  - Density: 144.8/km^{2} (375.0/sq mi)
- Time zone: UTC+1 (CET)
  - Summer (DST): UTC+2 (CEST)
- Postal code: 43-424
- Car plates: SCI
- Website: Official website

Drogomyśl [drɔˈɡɔmɨɕl] is a village in Gmina Strumień, Cieszyn County, in the Silesian Voivodeship of southern Poland.

The name of the village is of possessive origin, derived from personal name Drogomysł (pl).

== History ==
The village lies in the historical region of Cieszyn Silesia. It was first mentioned in a written document in 1452 as Drogomissl. Politically it belonged then to the Duchy of Teschen, a fee of the Kingdom of Bohemia, which after 1526 became a part of the Habsburg monarchy.

After the 1540s Reformation prevailed in the Duchy of Teschen and many local citizens became Lutherans. After issuing the Patent of Toleration in 1781 they subsequently organized a local Lutheran parish as one of over ten in the region. The village belonged then to the Kalisch family (who bought it in 1737). They sponsored the church, whose construction commenced in 1788, although the process took over 10 years.

After the Revolutions of 1848 in the Austrian Empire a modern municipal division was introduced in the re-established Austrian Silesia. The village as a municipality was subscribed to the political district of Bielsko and the legal district of Strumień. According to the censuses conducted in 1880, 1890, 1900 and 1910 the population of the municipality dropped from 1441 in 1880 to 1285 in 1910 with the majority being native Polish-speakers (96.8% up to 1900 and dropping to 87% in 1910) followed by a small German-speaking minority (44-46 or 3.2% up to 1900 and growing up to 165 or 12.9% in 1910), in terms of religion in 1910 majority were Protestants (62.8%), followed by Roman Catholics (35.9%) and Jews (17 or 1.3%). The village was also traditionally inhabited by Cieszyn Vlachs, speaking Cieszyn Silesian dialect.

After World War I, fall of Austria-Hungary, Polish–Czechoslovak War and the division of Cieszyn Silesia in 1920, it became a part of Poland. It was then annexed by Nazi Germany at the beginning of World War II. After the war it was restored to Poland.

The Catholic Our Lady of Częstochowa Church was built in 1969.

== Geography ==
Drogomyśl lies in the southern part of Poland, approximately 5 km (3 mi) south of the nearest town, Strumień, 16 km (10 mi) north-east of the county seat, Cieszyn, 20 km (12 mi) north-west of Bielsko-Biała, 50 km (31 mi) south-west of the regional capital Katowice, and 11 km (6.8 mi) east of the border with the Czech Republic.

The village is situated in Oświęcim Basin, between roughly 260–270 m (850–890 ft) above sea level, 16 km (9.9 mi) north-west of the Silesian Beskids. The main part of the village (historical Drogomyśl) lies on the right bank of the Vistula which separates it from Knaj hamlet, which lies on the left bank of the river.
