= Torricelli's experiment =

1644 physics experiment

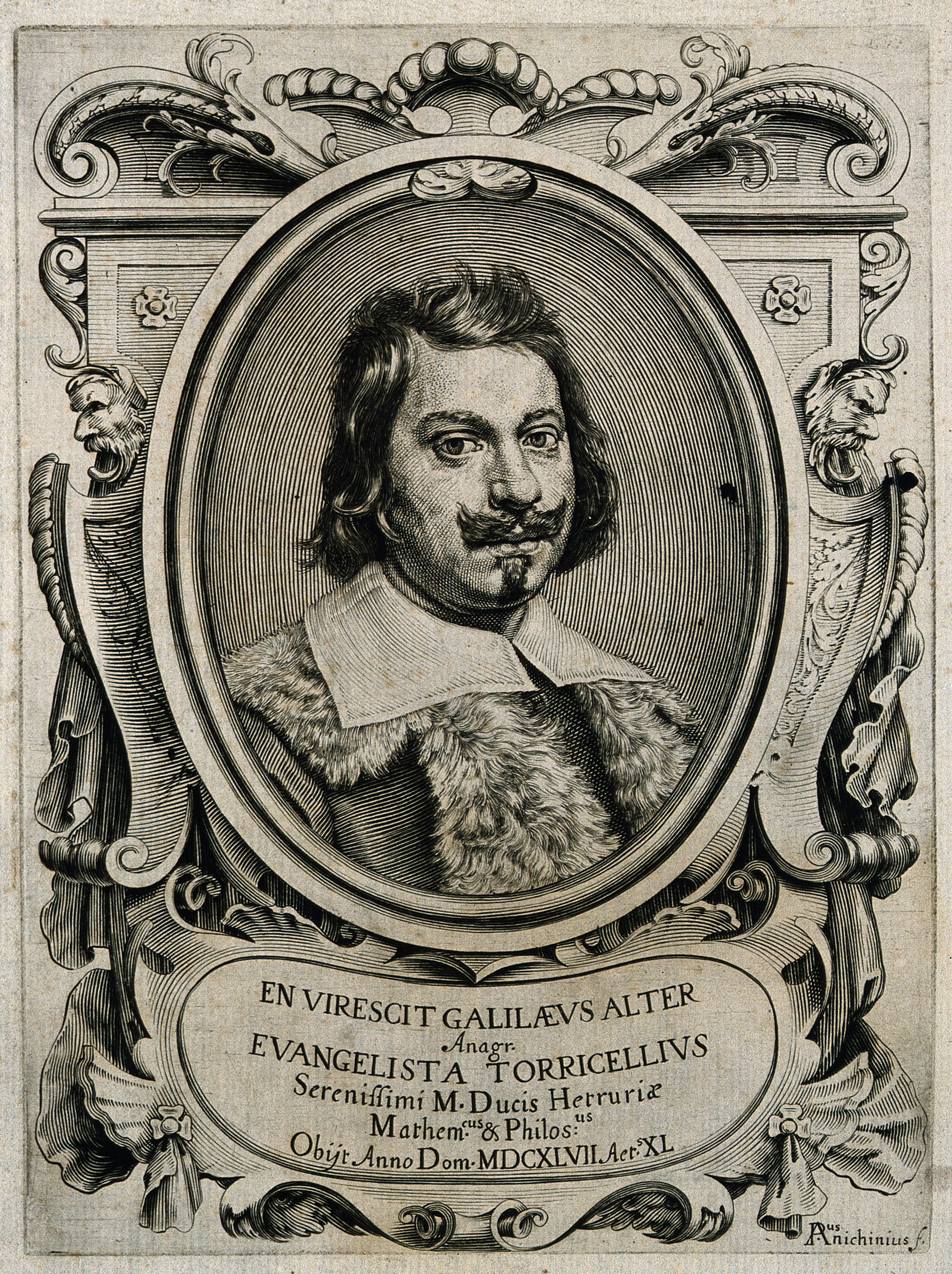
Evangelista Torricelli. Line engraving by P. Anichinius. Wellcome V0005861

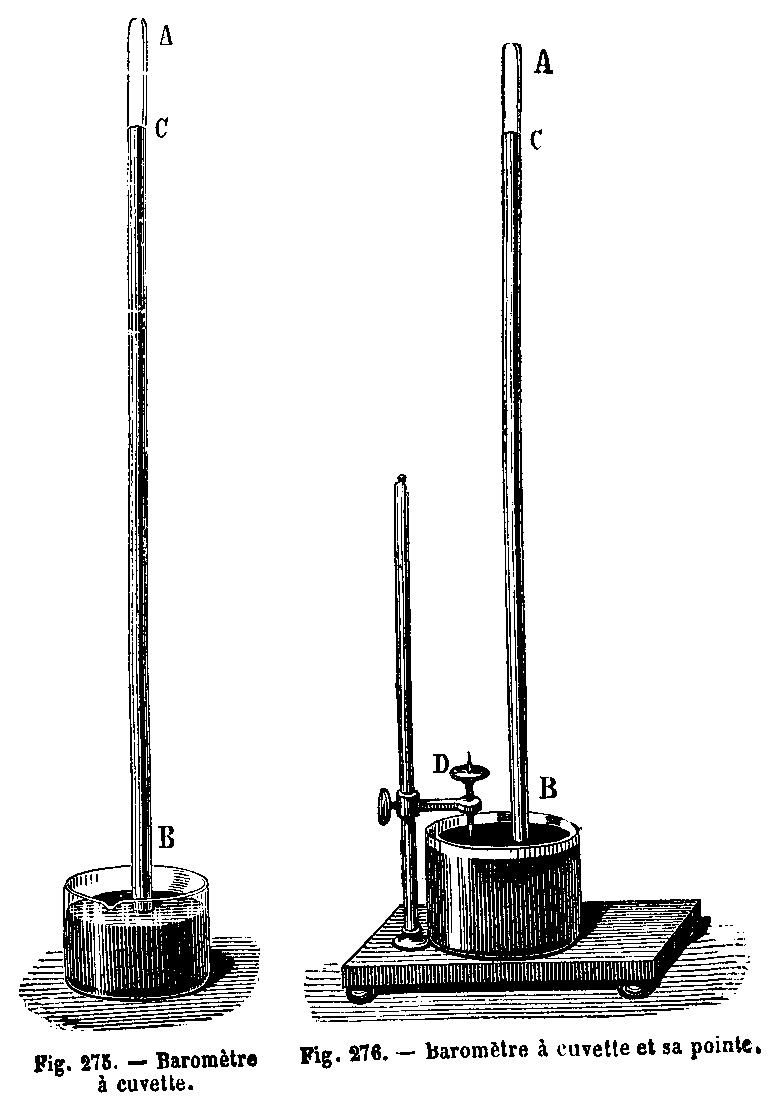
Torricelli invented the mercury barometer, recorded in the books of Camille Flammarion (1923)

Torricelli's experiment was invented in Pisa in 1644 by the Italian scientist Evangelista Torricelli (1608-1647). The purpose of his experiment is to prove that the source of "horror of the vacuum" by nature comes from atmospheric pressure.

== Context ==
For much of human history, the pressure of gases like air was ignored, denied, or taken for granted, but as early as the 6th century BC, Greek philosopher Anaximenes of Miletus claimed that all things are made of air that is simply changed by varying levels of pressure. He could observe water evaporating and changing to a gas and felt that this applied even to solid matter. More condensed air made colder, heavier objects, and expanded air made lighter, hotter objects. This was akin to how gases become less dense when warmer and more dense when cooler.

Aristotle stated in some writings that "nature abhors a vacuum" and also that air has no mass/weight. The popularity of that philosopher kept this the dominant view in Europe for two thousand years. Even Galileo accepted it, believing that the pull of vacuum creates a siphon and that the pull can be overcome if the siphon is high enough.

In the 17th century, Evangelista Torricelli conducted experiments with mercury that allowed him to measure the presence of air. He would submerge a glass tube, closed at one end, into a bowl of mercury ensuring the tube contained only mercury and no bubbles. He would then raise the closed-end of the tube out of the mercury while keeping the open-end submerged. Under its own weight, the mercury in the tube would fall a small distance and leave a partial vacuum at the top (closed-end) of the tube. This validated his belief that air/gas has mass, creating pressure on things around it: in this case, applying pressure on the surface of mercury in the bowl such that the mercury in the tube was unable to empty. The discovery helped bring Torricelli to the following conclusion:

We live submerged at the bottom of an ocean of the element air, which by unquestioned experiments is known to have weight.

This test was essentially the first documented pressure gauge.

In 1647 Valerianus Magnus published his Demonstratio ocularis, in which he claims to have proved the existence of the vacuum in the court of the king of Poland, Ladislaus IV, in Warsaw by means of an experiment identical to that carried out by Torricelli three years earlier. Three months after Magnus, Blaise Pascal published his Expériences nouvelles touchant le vide, giving details of his first barometric experiments.

Pascal went farther than Torricelli, having his brother-in-law try the experiment at different altitudes on a mountain and finding, indeed, that the farther down in the ocean of atmosphere, the higher the pressure.

== Procedure ==
The experiment uses a simple barometer to measure the pressure of air, filling it with mercury up until 75% of the tube. Any air bubbles in the tube must be removed by inverting several times. After that, a clean mercury is filled once again until the tube is completely full. The barometer is then placed inverted on the dish full of mercury. This causes the mercury in the tube to fall down until the difference between mercury on the surface and in the tube is about 760 mm. Even when the tube is shaken or tilted, the difference between the surface and in the tube is not affected due to the influence of atmospheric pressure.

== Conclusion ==
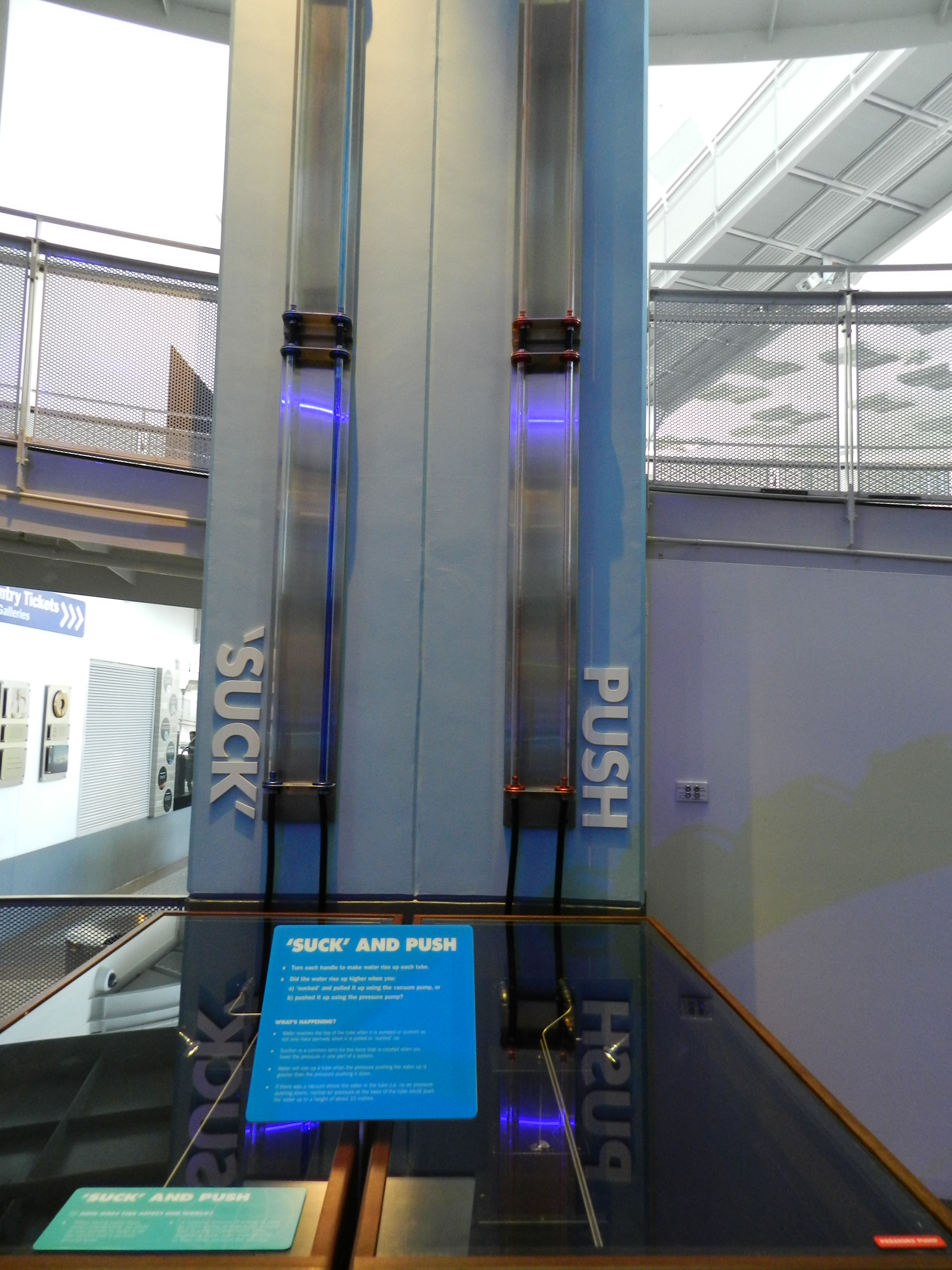
Demonstration of Torricelli pump at Questacon

Torricelli concluded that the mercury fluid in the tube is aided by the atmospheric pressure that is present on the surface of mercury fluid on the dish. He also stated that the changes of liquid level from day to day are caused by the variation of atmospheric pressure. The empty space in the tube is called the Torricellian vacuum.

- 760 mmHg = 1 atm
- 1 atm = 1,013 mbar or hPa
- 1 mbar or hPa = 0.7502467 mmHg

1 pascal = 1 Newton per square metre (SI unit) 1 hectopascal is 100 000 pascals

== Additional images ==
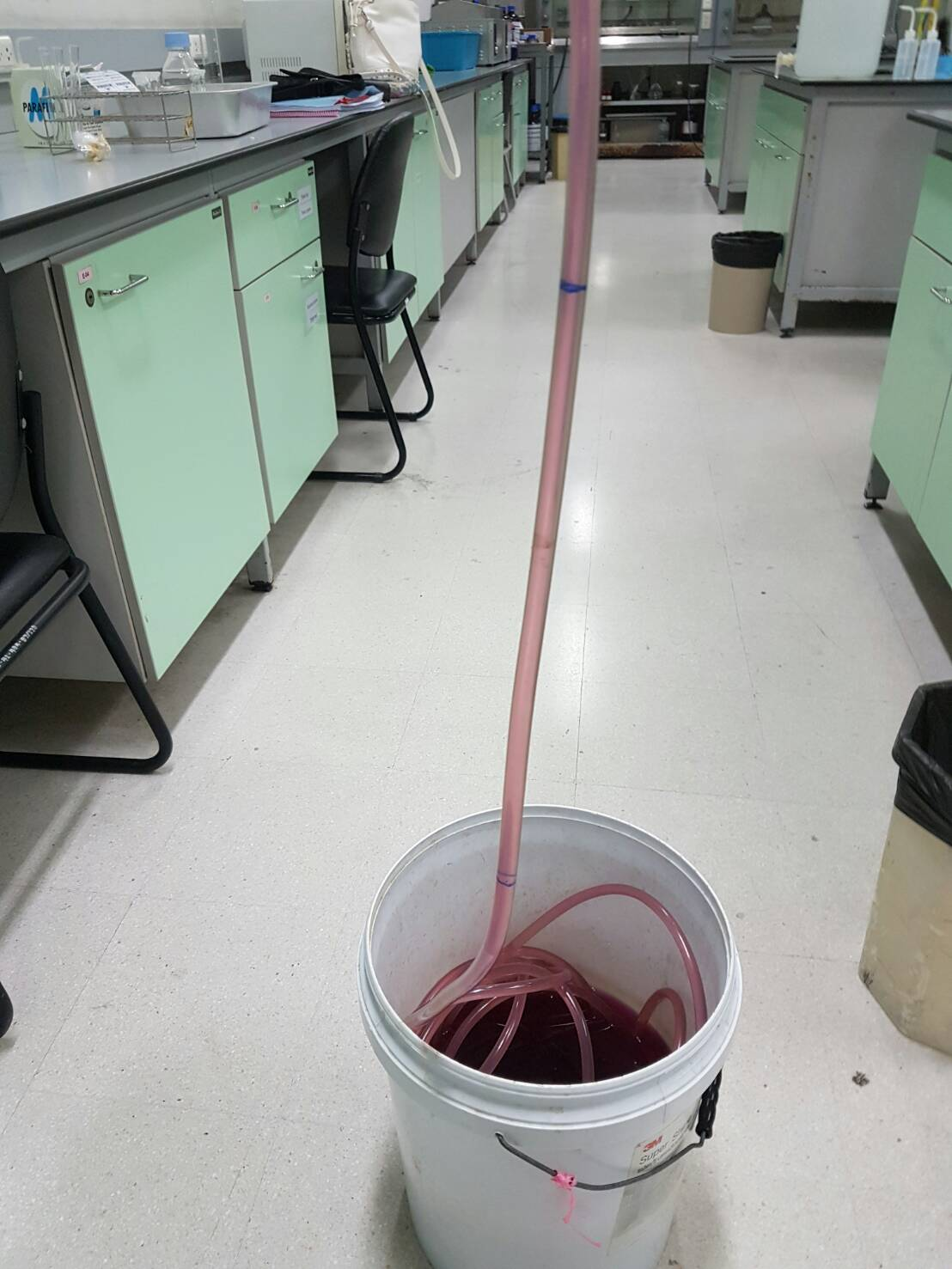
Water is coloured with potassium permanganate for easy visualization.

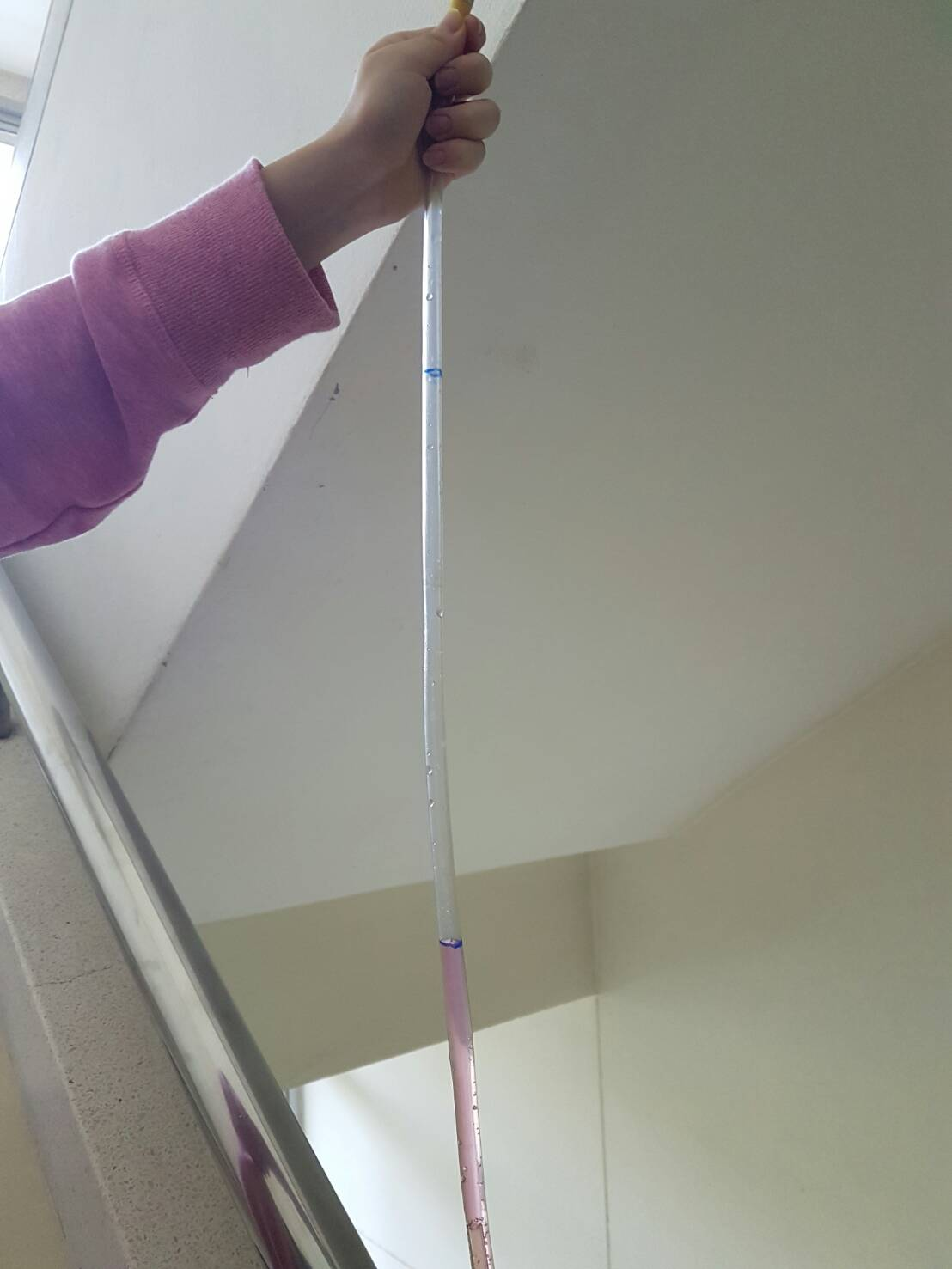
Tube from the bucket is pulled up to the third floor of the building and the point where the liquid ceases to rise observed.

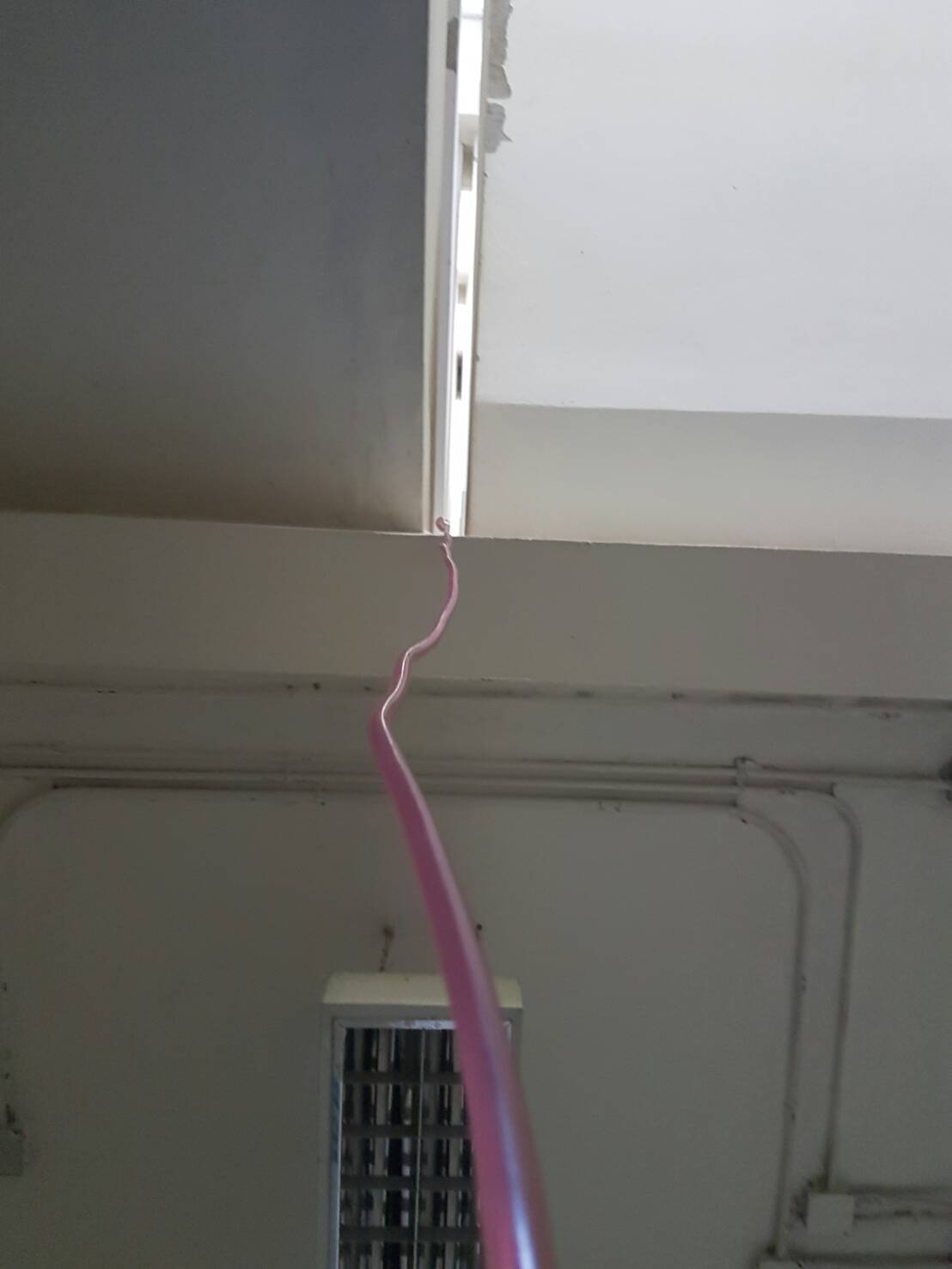
The photo is taken from upward angle while performing Torricelli's experiment.
