= Bąków, Silesian Voivodeship =

Bąków
- Village
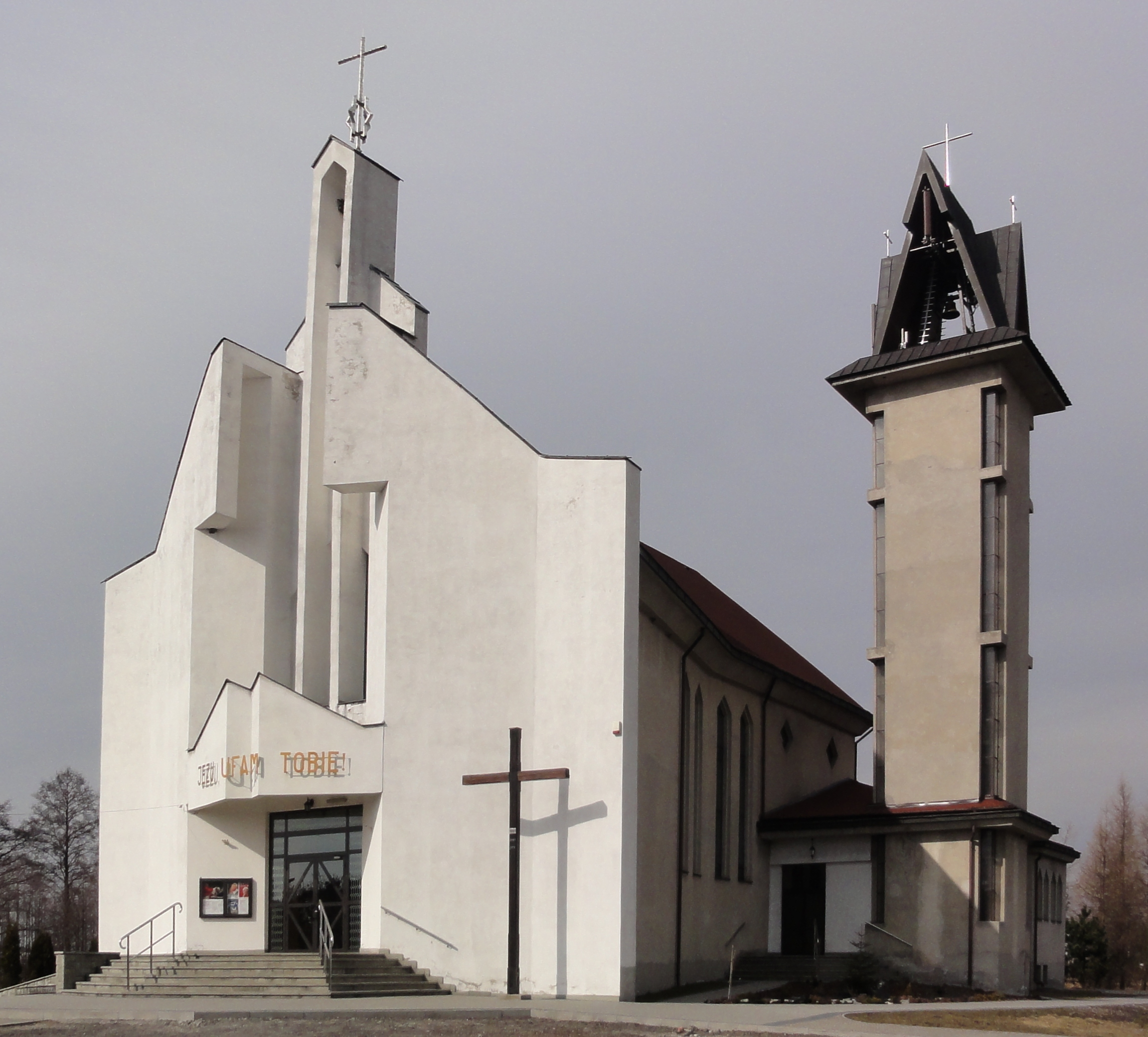
- Church of Divine Mercy

- Coat of arms

- Location within Poland
- Coordinates: 49°53′53″N 18°43′58.4″E
- Country: Poland
- Voivodeship: Silesian
- County: Cieszyn
- Gmina: Strumień
- First mentioned: 1536

Government
  - Mayor: Barbara Maślanka

Area
  - Total: 5.91 km^{2} (2.28 sq mi)

Population (June 2008)
  - Total: 1,534
  - Density: 260/km^{2} (672/sq mi)
- Time zone: UTC+1 (CET)
  - Summer (DST): UTC+2 (CEST)
- Postal code: 43-246
- Car plates: SCI
- Website: http://www.strumien.pl/bakow

Bąków [ˈbɔŋkuf] is a village in Gmina Strumień, Cieszyn County, Silesian Voivodeship, southern Poland. It lies in the historical region of Cieszyn Silesia. Former village of Rychułd is now a western part of Bąków.

== History ==
Rychułd was first mentioned in 1416 as Reicholtowacz. It had to be older as it was divided into two parts (one belonging to dukes and one to nobility), and was later mentioned also as Rycholtow (1440), Richuoltwo (1447), Rychultow (1473, 1529), Rychuld (1568). Bąków was a younger village and was first mentioned in 1536. Politically the villages belonged then to the Duchy of Teschen, a fee of the Kingdom of Bohemia, which after 1526 became part of the Habsburg monarchy.

In 1552 Bąków (Bunkow) was bestowed by Wenceslaus III Adam, Duke of Cieszyn upon Czelo family, which in the early 17th century owned also Rychułd. Bludowscy family became their owners by marriage in 1619. In 1737 they were sold to Christian Kalisch.

After Revolutions of 1848 in the Austrian Empire a modern municipal division was introduced in the re-established Austrian Silesia. Bąków and Rychułd were administratively joined as one municipality subscribed to the political district of Bielsko and the legal district of Strumień. According to the censuses conducted in 1880, 1890, 1900 and 1910 the population of the municipality grew from 415 in 1880 to 428 in 1910 (of whom 251 in Bąków and 177 in Rychułd) with a dwindling majority being native Polish-speakers (391 or 98.7% in 1880 to 371 or 89% in 1910) and growing German-speaking minority (5 or 1.3% in 1880 to 46 or 11% in 1910, of whom 40 in Rychułd), in terms of religion in 1910 the most populous were Protestants (214 or 48%; of whom 116 in Bąków and 98 in Rychułd), followed by Roman Catholics (205 or 50%, of whom 135 in Bąków and 70 in Rychułd) and 9 or 2% Jews (in Rychułd). The villages were also traditionally inhabited by Cieszyn Vlachs, speaking Cieszyn Silesian dialect.

After World War I, fall of Austria-Hungary, Polish–Czechoslovak War and the division of Cieszyn Silesia in 1920, it became a part of Poland. It was then annexed by Nazi Germany at the beginning of World War II. After the war it was restored to Poland.
