= Bartholomaeus Nigrinus =

German protestant theologian & pastor (1595–1646)

- Born: 1595; Bąków, Silesian Voivodeship
- Died: 12 October 1646
- Occupations: Theologian, philosopher

Bartholomaeus Schwartz (latinised to Bartholomaeus Nigrinus) (1595 – 12 October 1646) was a German protestant theologian, pastor of the St. Peter and St. Paul's Church in Danzig (Gdańsk), Royal Prussia (now Poland).

== Biography ==
Bartholomaeus Schwartz was born in 1595 in Bąków, of Socinian parents. He might be related to Wilhelm Nigrinus (1588-1638), a German philosopher.

Having converted to Lutheranism, he later became a Calvinist minister at Gdańsk. The famous poet Martin Opitz, a friend, lodged at pastor Nigrinus' place, while visiting Gdańsk. Both Opitz and Nigrinus corresponded with Robert Fludd. Fludd was connected to the Rosicrucian movement and the Gdańsk edition of the Rosicrucian manifesto Fama Fraternitatis was published by the printer Andreas Hünefeld (Huenefeldt or Hunsfeldus) (1609-1652), a friend of Nigrinus. Nigrinus was also a friend and disciple of the Czech philosopher John Amos Comenius, who has often been linked to the Rosicrucian movement.

After the death of Opitz, Nigrinus and two of his associates edited his poems (Gdańsk: Hünefeld, 1639).

Later in his life, Nigrinus converted to Catholicism. His conversion was not publicized until 1642. After his conversion, he was appointed confidential secretary to Władysław IV.

Nigrinus maintained, before the king and several bishops, that it would be possible to unite all Christian churches by means of a friendly discussion between some chosen doctors of the different confessions. The king adopted the advice of Nigrinus, and resolved to call to a friendly meeting (Colloquium Charitativum), a number of divines of all the Christian confessions. He communicated his idea to the primate Maciej Łubieński and Pope Innocent X, and ordered, as a preparatory step for the intended meeting, the convocation of a Roman Catholic synod, which was held at Warsaw towards the end of the year 1643. The meeting was finally called to convene at Toruń, on October 10, 1644. The date was later extended to August 28, 1645; but when it convened it was soon made evident that a union of Protestants and Catholics was out of the question, the latter refusing to give up communion under one kind, the former to accept papal supremacy; and after several protests had been made on both sides, the inutility of continuing the discussions became evident, and the colloquium was closed on November 21 with much less solemnity than it had been opened. Instead of producing, as had been hoped, a reconciliation of the adverse confessions, or even an approximation to it, the colloquium rather increased their mutual acrimony; and each party published pamphlets, charging its opponents with the ill success of the congress. After this we hear no more of Nigrinus.

== Bibliography ==
- This article incorporates public domain material from McClintock, John; Strong, James (1867–1887). Cyclopædia of Biblical, Theological and Ecclesiastical Literature. Harper and Brothers.

== See also ==
- Peter Georg Niger (Latinized from Schwartz) (1434 in Kaaden - 1481/1484)
