= Gmina Strumień =

Gmina Strumień Strumień Commune
- Gmina
- Coat of arms

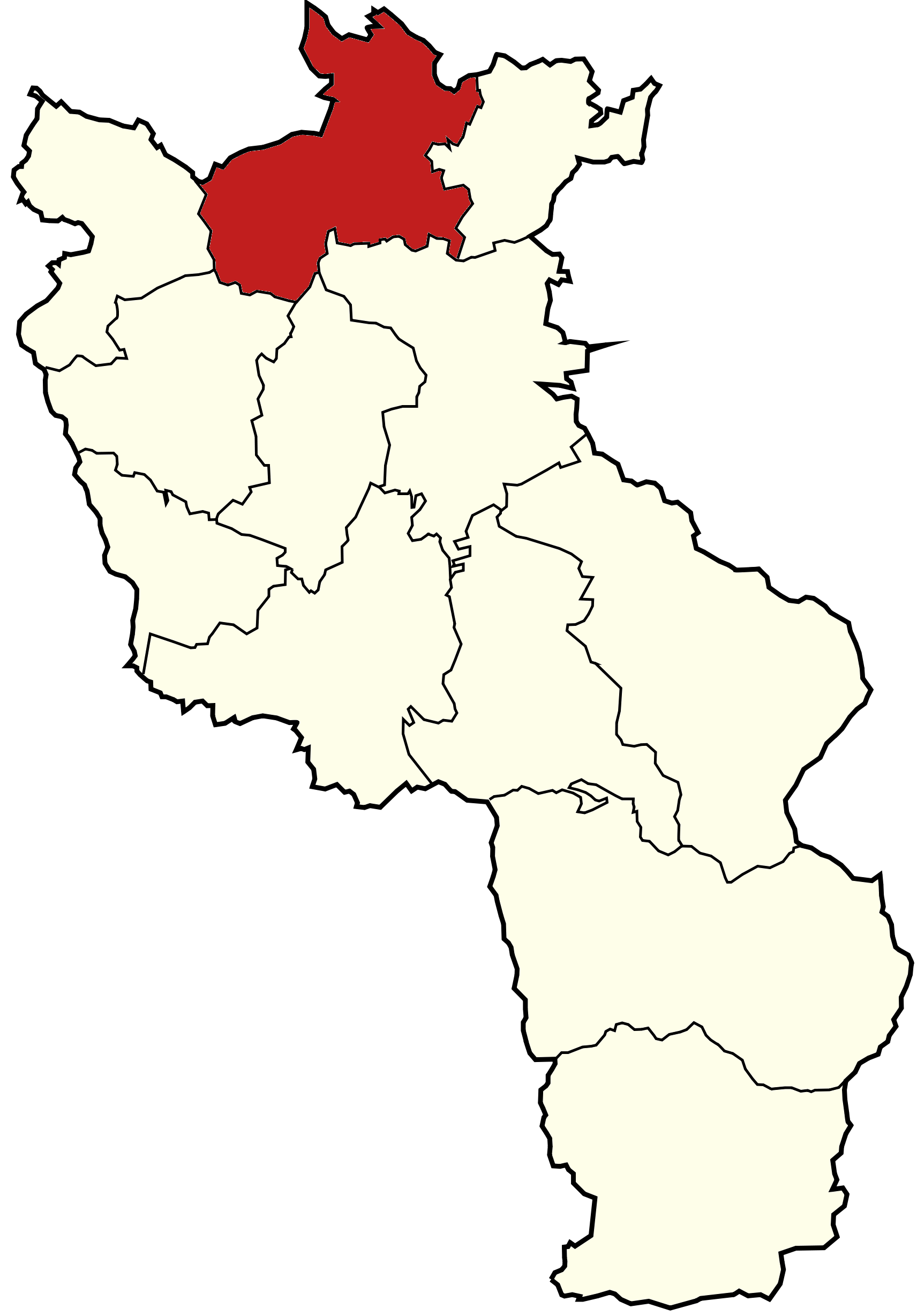
- Gmina Strumień within the Cieszyn County
- Coordinates (Strumień): 49°55′2″N 18°45′49″E
- Country: Poland
- Voivodeship: Silesian
- County: Cieszyn
- Seat: Strumień

Government
  - Mayor: Anna Agnieszka Grygierek

Area
  - Total: 58.4 km^{2} (22.5 sq mi)

Population (2019-06-30)
  - Total: 13,240
  - Density: 227/km^{2} (587/sq mi)
  - Urban: 3,718
  - Rural: 9,522
- Website: http://www.strumien.pl/

Gmina Strumień is an urban-rural gmina (administrative district) in Cieszyn County, Silesian Voivodeship, in southern Poland, in the historical region of Cieszyn Silesia. Its seat is the town of Strumień.

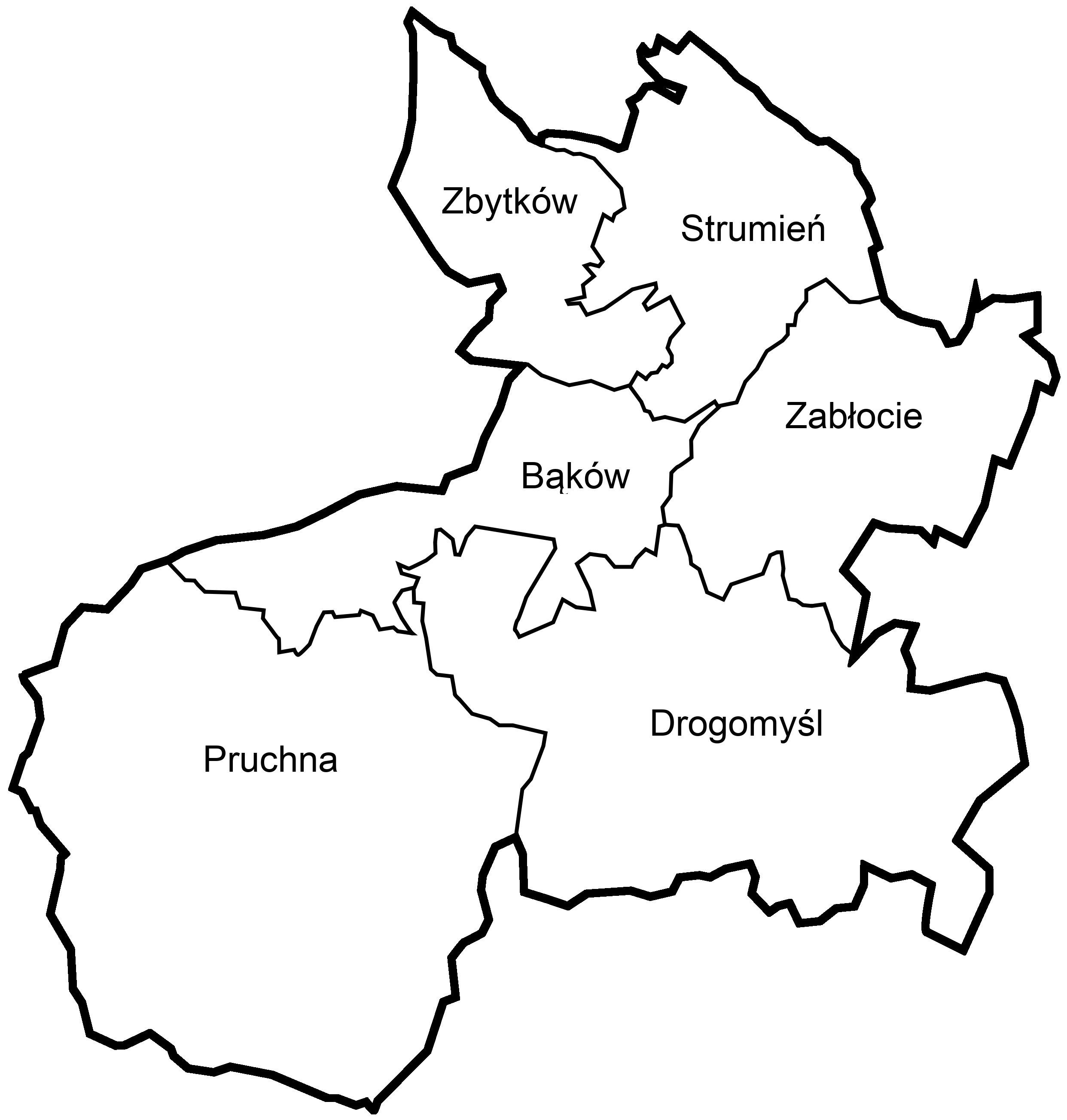
Division of the gmina

The gmina covers an area of 58.4 square kilometres (22.5 sq mi), and as of 2019 its total population is 13,240.

== Villages ==
Apart from the town of Strumień, Gmina Strumień contains the villages and settlements of Bąków, Drogomyśl, Pruchna, Zabłocie and Zbytków.

== Neighbouring gminas ==
Gmina Strumień is bordered by the gminas of Chybie, Dębowiec, Goczałkowice-Zdrój, Hażlach, Pawłowice, Pszczyna, Skoczów and Zebrzydowice.

== Twin towns – sister cities ==
Gmina Strumień is twinned with:

- Dolní Domaslavice, Czech Republic
- Dolný Hričov, Slovakia
- Krasňany, Slovakia
- Petřvald, Czech Republic
- Šenov, Czech Republic
- Súľov-Hradná, Slovakia
