= Pruchna =

- Village
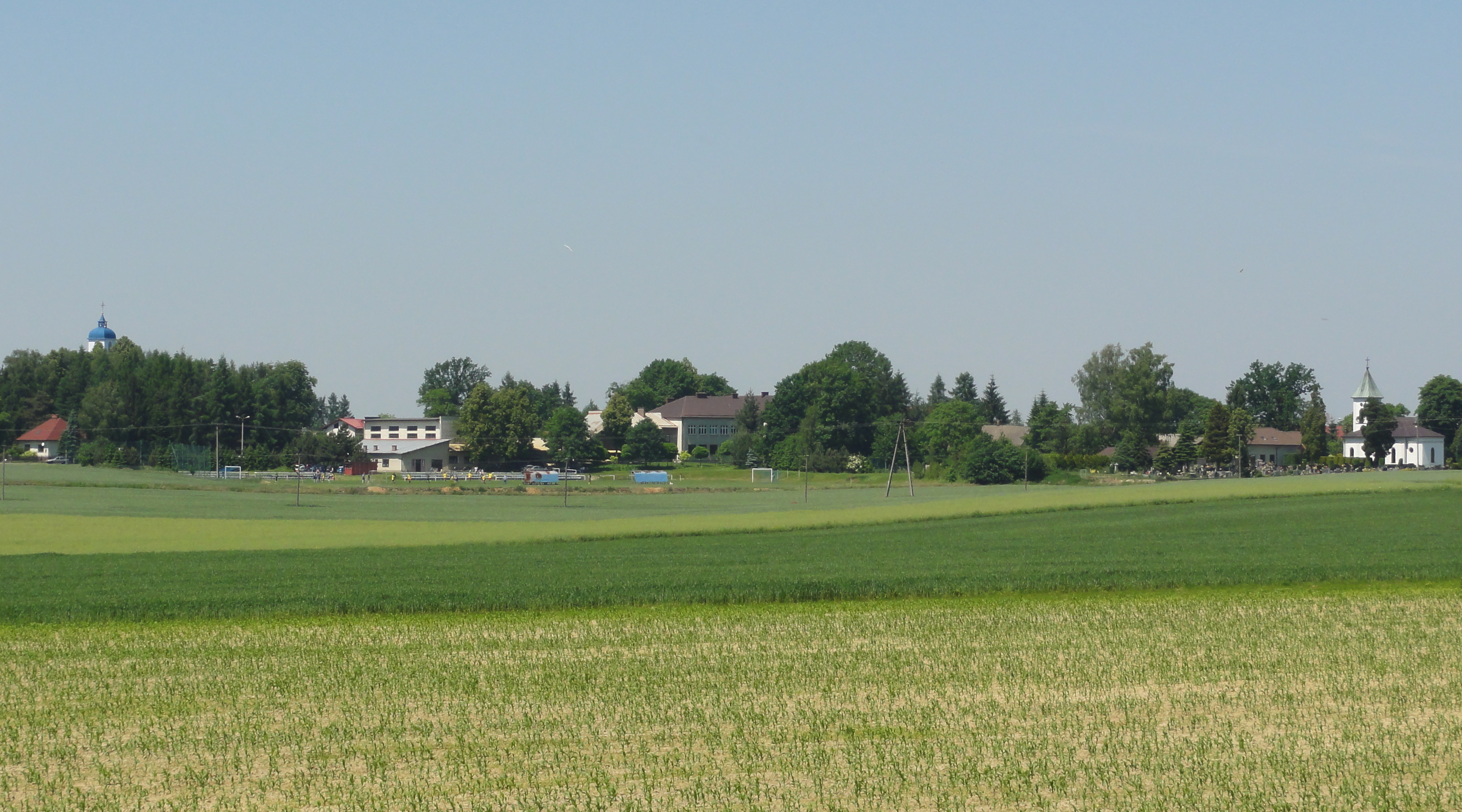
- General view

- Coat of arms

- Location within Poland
- Coordinates: 49°51′55.1″N 18°40′57.17″E
- Country: Poland
- Voivodeship: Silesian
- County: Cieszyn
- Gmina: Strumień
- First mentioned: ca. 1305

Government
  - Mayor: Leszek Czakon

Area
  - Total: 19.03 km^{2} (7.35 sq mi)

Population (June 2008)
  - Total: 2,442
  - Density: 128.3/km^{2} (332.4/sq mi)
- Time zone: UTC+1 (CET)
  - Summer (DST): UTC+2 (CEST)
- Postal code: 43-523
- Vehicle registration: SCI
- Website: http://www.strumien.pl/pruchna

Pruchna [ˈpruxna] is a village in Gmina Strumień, Cieszyn County, Silesian Voivodeship, in southern Poland.

== Etymology ==
Originally the name of the village was Prochna or Prochno. The name of the village is of topographic origin and is derived from the rotten trees (próchno in Polish denotes dry rot). It was sometimes Germanised as Pruchnau.

== History ==
The village lies in the historical region of Cieszyn Silesia. It was first mentioned in a Latin document of Diocese of Wrocław called Liber fundationis episcopatus Vratislaviensis from around 1305 as item in Prochna. It meant that the village was in the process of location (the size of land to pay a tithe from was not yet precise). The creation of the village was a part of a larger settlement campaign taking place in the late 13th century on the territory of what would later be known as Upper Silesia.

Politically the village belonged initially to the Duchy of Cieszyn, formed in 1290 in the process of feudal fragmentation of Poland and was ruled by a local branch of Silesian Piast dynasty until 1653. In 1327 the duchy became a fee of the Kingdom of Bohemia, which after 1526 became a part of the Habsburg monarchy.

The village became a seat of a Catholic parish, mentioned in the register of Peter's Pence payment from 1447 among 50 parishes of Teschen deanery as Prochna.

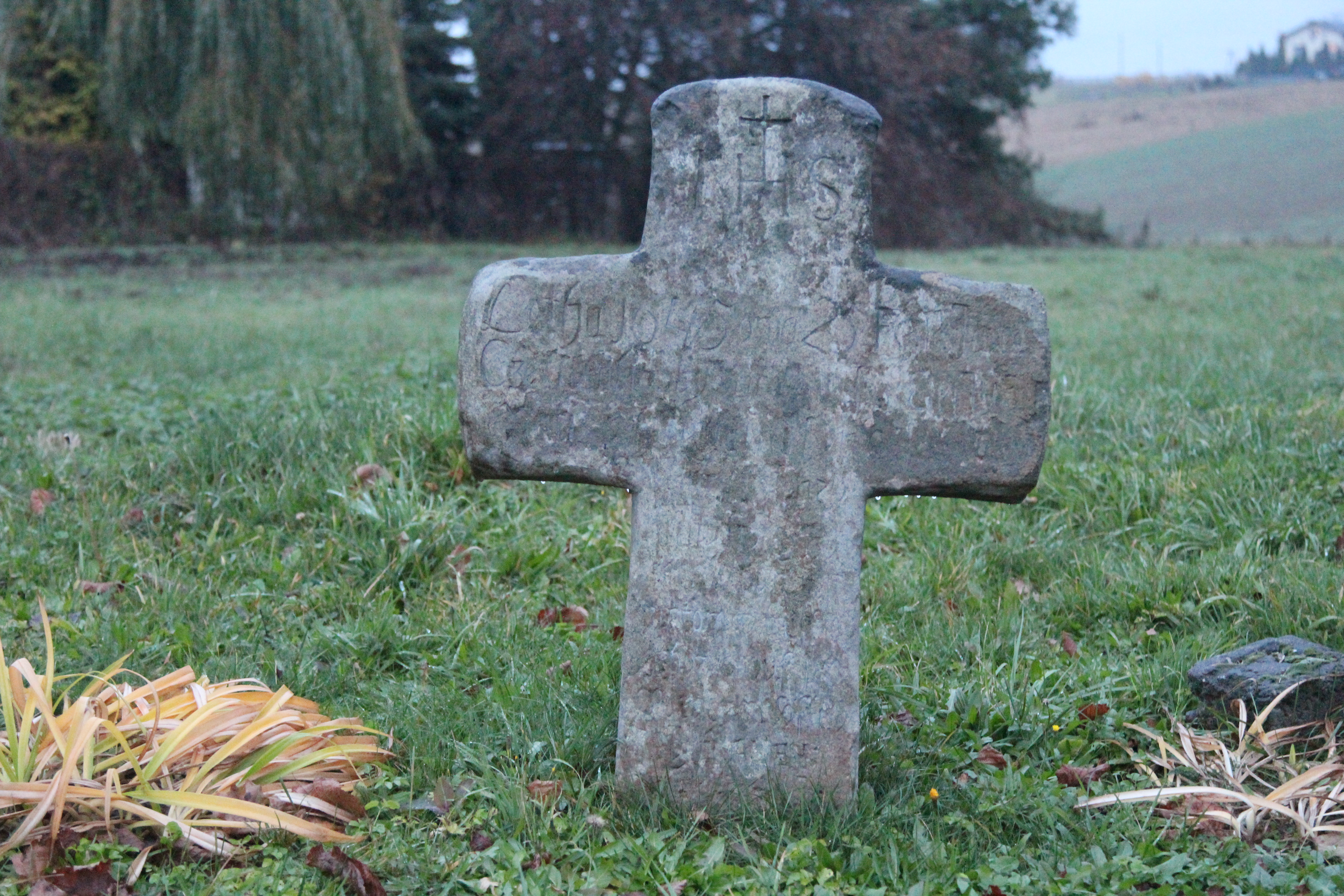
17th-century conciliation cross

After the 1540s Protestant Reformation prevailed in the Duchy of Cieszyn and a local Catholic church was taken over by Lutherans. It was taken from them (as one from around fifty buildings in the region) by a special commission and given back to the Roman Catholic Church on 15 April 1654.

In 1844-1863 a train station has been constructed in Pruchna on the Emperor Ferdinand Northern Railway.

After the Revolutions of 1848 in the Austrian Empire a modern municipal division was introduced in the re-established Austrian Silesia. The village as a municipality was subscribed to the political district of Bielsko and the legal district of Schwarzwasser. According to the censuses conducted in 1880, 1890, 1900 and 1910 the population of the municipality dropped from 1525 in 1880 to 1467 in 1910 with the majority being native Polish-speakers (95.6%-96.4%) accompanied by a small German-speaking minority (at most 59 or 4.1% in 1890) and Czech-speaking (at most 20 or 1.4% in 1900), in terms of religion in 1910 majority were Roman Catholics (64.1%), followed by Protestants (35%) and Jews (13 or 0.9%). The village was also traditionally inhabited by Cieszyn Vlachs, speaking Cieszyn Silesian dialect.

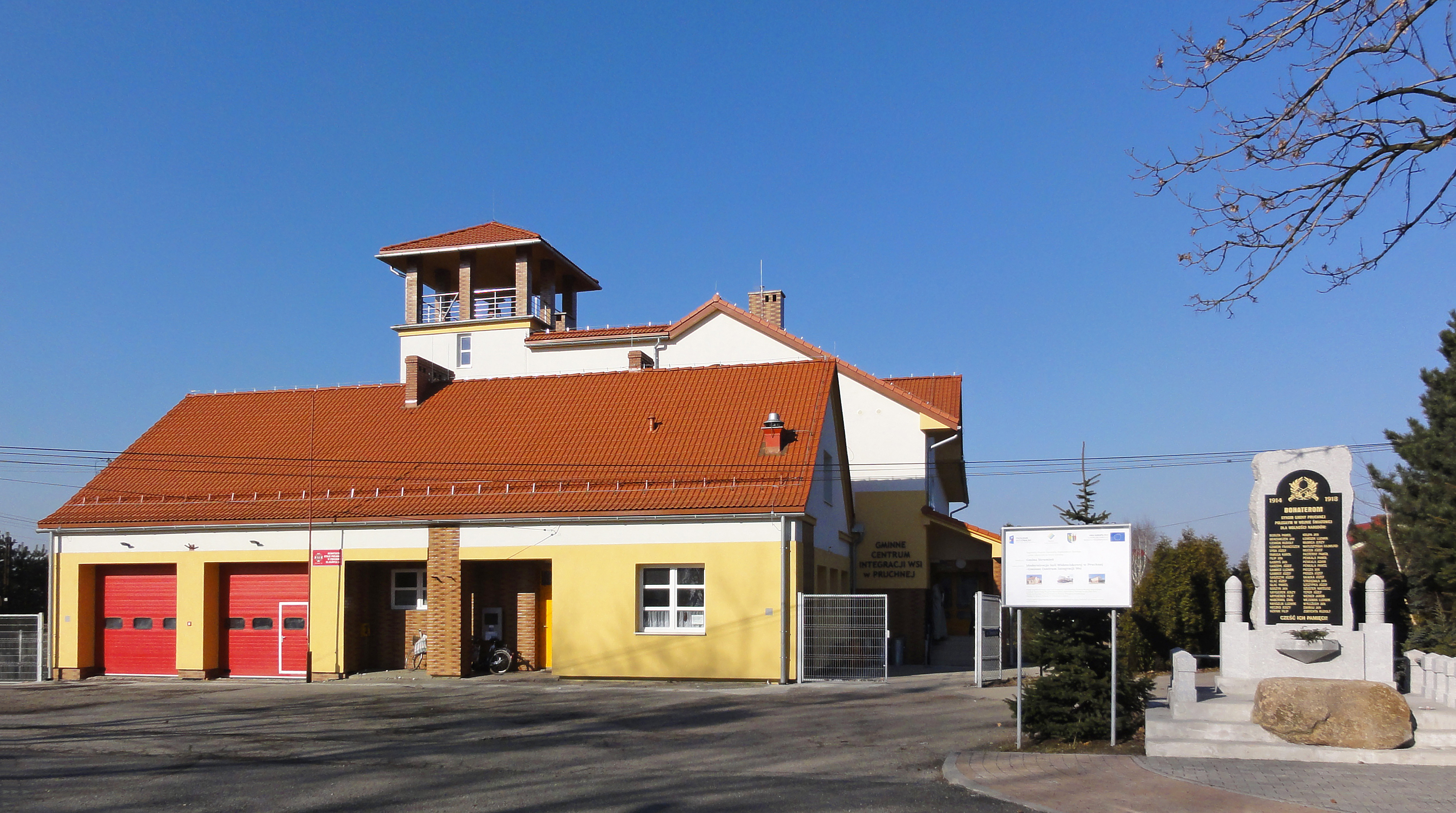
Fire department and World War I memorial

After World War I, the fall of Austria-Hungary, the Polish–Czechoslovak War and the division of Cieszyn Silesia in 1920, it became a part of Poland. It was then occupied and annexed by Nazi Germany at the beginning of World War II. A local Polish police officer was murdered by the Russians in the Katyn massacre in 1940. After the war it was restored to Poland.

In 1945 a Catholic Saint Anne church was almost completely destroyed, and it had to be rebuilt. There is also a Lutheran Resurrection of the Lord Church, and a memorial to soldiers of the Red Army fallen in Pruchna in the last months of World War II.

== Geography ==
Pruchna lies in the southern part of Poland, approximately 8 km (5 mi) south-west of the nearest town, Strumień, 14 km (9 mi) north of the county seat, Cieszyn, 26 km (16 mi) west of Bielsko-Biała, 50 km (31 mi) south-west of the regional capital Katowice, and 6 km (3.7 mi) east of the border with the Czech Republic.

The village is situated near the geographical border between Ostrava Basin in the west and Oświęcim Basin in the east, between roughly 260–280 m (850–920 ft) above sea level, 20 km (12 mi) north-west of the Silesian Beskids. It also straddles over the border between watersheds of Odra (through Olza to the west) and Vistula (through Knajka to the east); The largest stretch of forest, called Badula, is located in the south-east part of the village.
