= Teschener Kammer =

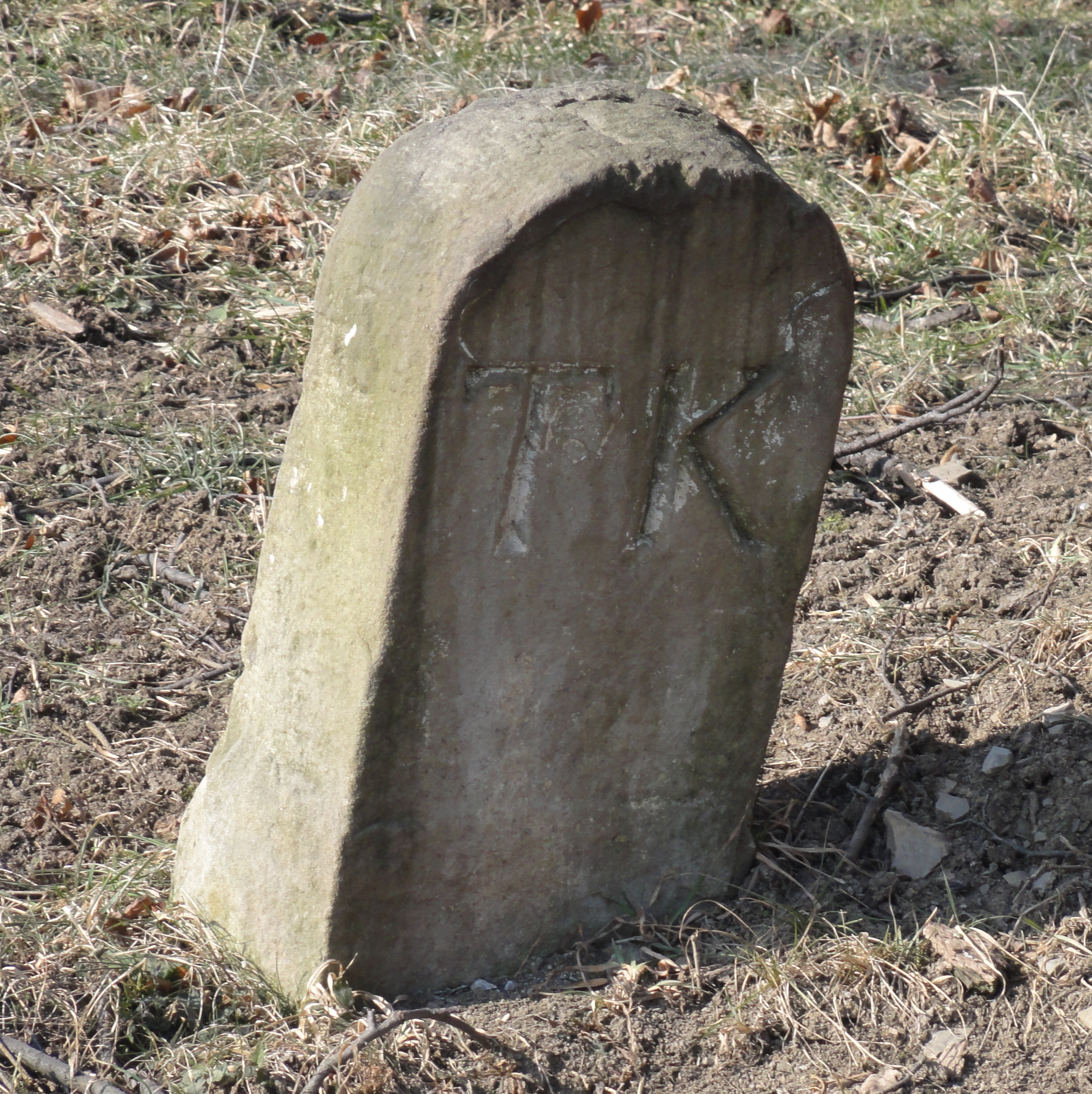
TK - Teschener Kammer, border stone in Iskrzyczyn

Teschener Kammer or Teschen Chamber (Polish: Komora Cieszyńska, Czech: Těšínská komora ) is a name of a latifundium owned directly by the Dukes of Teschen in the years 1653–1918 and a name of the institution managing it on their behalf.

== History ==
It was instituted after the death of Elizabeth Lucretia in 1653, which ended the Cieszyn Piast's rule in the duchy. The duchy lapsed directly to the Bohemian monarchs, at that time the Habsburgs. As opposed to the local Piast dukes they lived away from the duchy and this necessitated the deployment of administrators presided over by a regent. Kaspar Tłuk became the first regent in September 1653.

Initially the Teschener Kammer encompassed 4 towns (Cieszyn, Skoczów, Strumień and Jablunkov) and 31 villages organised into two circles (Cieszyn-Jablunkov and Skoczów-Strumień). In 1737 it had 4 towns, 49 villages and 21 folwarks.

A rapid development of the Teschener Kammer came after the First Partition of Poland in 1772. The abolition of socage facilitated industrial development. A steel mill was opened in 1772 in Ustroń. In 1791 Albert Casimir, Duke of Teschen, began to purchase numerous villages within Cieszyn Silesia. In 1797 he bought the independent territory of Friedeck. In the 19th century it grew considerably, with mines, sawmills, breweries etc. being launched by the Kammer. In 1838 Archduke Charles, Duke of Teschen, purchased Żywiec latifundium and included it in the Teschener Kammer. In 1839 steel mill in Třinec began operating.

After World War I and the fall of Austria-Hungary the Kammer was liquidated: its properties were nationalised in Poland and Czechoslovakia.
