= Strumień =

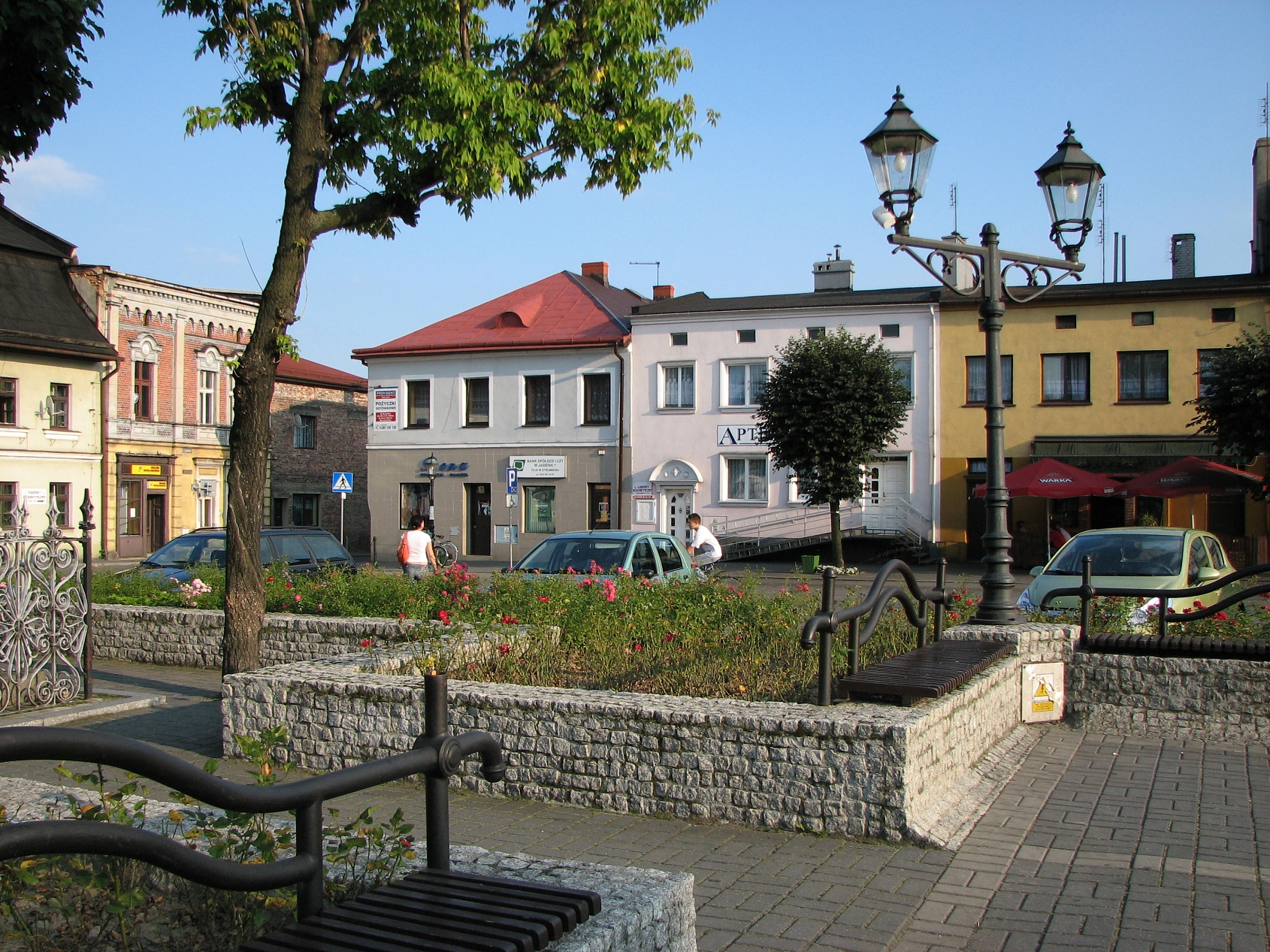
- Town square

- Coat of arms

- Location within Poland
- Coordinates: 49°55′2″N 18°45′49″E
- Country: Poland
- Voivodeship: Silesian
- County: Cieszyn
- Gmina: Strumień
- Founded: 13th century
- First mentioned: 1407
- Town rights: 1482

Government
  - Mayor: Anna Agnieszka Grygierek

Area
  - Total: 6.45 km^{2} (2.49 sq mi)

Population (2019-06-30)
  - Total: 3,718
  - Density: 576/km^{2} (1,490/sq mi)
- Time zone: UTC+1 (CET)
  - Summer (DST): UTC+2 (CEST)
- Postal code: 43-246
- Car plates: SCI
- Website: http://www.strumien.pl

Strumień ([ˈstrumʲɛɲ], Czech: Strumeň, Silesian: Strumiyń; German: Schwarzwasser) is a town and the seat of Gmina Strumień, in Cieszyn County, in the Silesian Voivodeship (province) of southern Poland, on the Vistula River.

It is located in the north-eastern part of the historical region of Cieszyn Silesia and is the smallest town in the county.

== Geography ==
Strumień is located in the northern part of the historic region of Cieszyn Silesia, on the border with Upper Silesia. The town lies in the southeastern part of the Silesian Voivodeship, about 20 km northwest of Bielsko-Biała and approximately 12 km from the centre of Jastrzębie-Zdrój.

The Vistula flows through the municipality. Since 1955, the river has been dammed by the Goczałkowice Reservoir, which borders the municipality.

== History ==
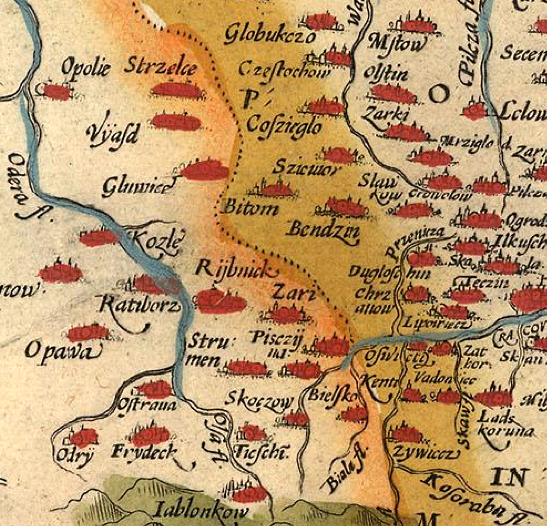
Fragment of a map from 1592 with Strumen marked

The name is of topographic origin and is derived from a local stream (now non-existent) first mentioned in 1293, known as Czarny Strumień (lit. black stream, therefore Schwarzwasser in German). It is not certain if the settlement already existed then as the village was first mentioned later in 1407 as Swarczenwassir. Later the village was also mentioned as Swarczenwasser (1409), Strumienie (1450), na Strumyeny (1470), miesto Strumien (1491). Politically it belonged then to the Duchy of Racibórz a fee of the Kingdom of Bohemia. During the political upheaval beginning in the 1470s caused by Matthias Corvinus the land around Pszczyna with Strumień was overtaken by Casimir II, Duke of Cieszyn, who bestowed the village to his retainer, Mikołaj (Nicolaus) Brodecki, who quickly managed to procure town rights for it in 1482. Casimir II sold Pszczyna circle in 1517 but the town of Strumień stayed within the Duchy of Teschen. In 1526 the Kingdom of Bohemia became part of the Habsburg monarchy.

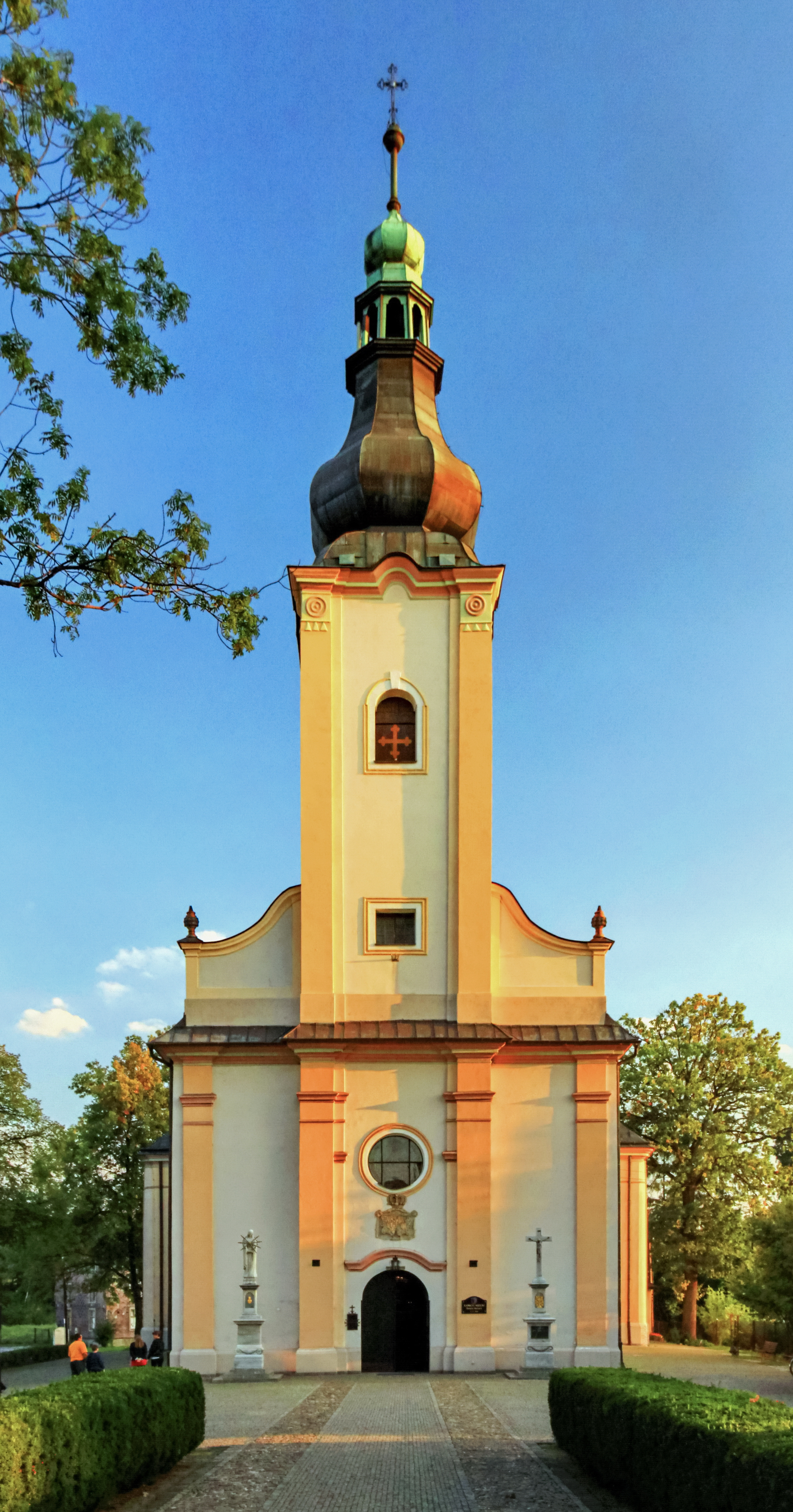
Baroque Saint Barbara church

In 1573–1577 the town together with Skoczów and their surrounding villages were sold to Gottard von Logau, and formed state country. (Note: Apart from Skoczów and Strumień 11 villages belonged to the state country: Brenna, Górki Małe, Kiczyce, Kowale, Lipowiec, Łazy, Wieszczęta, Wiślica, Zabłocie, Zarzecze and Zbytków, and furthermore Mnich was established at that time) It was retrieved by Adam Wenceslaus in 1594.

Since 1653 it belonged to Teschener Kammer. After Revolutions of 1848 in the Austrian Empire a modern municipal division was introduced in the re-established Austrian Silesia. The town became a seat of a legal district in the political district of Bielsko. According to the censuses conducted in 1880, 1890, 1900 and 1910 the population of the town dropped from 1731 in 1880 to 1579 in 1910. In 1880 the majority of its inhabitants were native Polish-speakers (83.6%) followed by German-speakers (15.4%) and Czech-speakers (16 or 1%). In the next years the Polish-speaking population dropped down to 45% in 1910, whereas German-speaking citizens grew in number up to 54.5% in 1910, Czech-speaking persons dwindled to 8 or 0.5%. In terms of religion in 1910 majority were Roman Catholics (1484 or 94%), followed by Jews (67 or 4.2%) and Protestants (28 or 1.8%). The town and especially its southern surroundings were also traditionally the northernmost area inhabited by Cieszyn Vlachs, speaking Cieszyn Silesian dialect. The growth of German language, then prestigious language of the state, can be partially attributed to various reasons, including cultural cringe of indigenous Slavic denizens.

After World War I, fall of Austria-Hungary, Polish–Czechoslovak War and the division of Cieszyn Silesia in 1920, it became again part of Poland. According to the 1921 census, Strumień had a population of 1,566, 94.0% Polish, 3.77% German, 1.98% Jewish and 0.19% Czech.

Following the invasion of Poland by the German army it was annexed by Nazi Germany at the beginning of World War II (as Schwarzwasser again). At least three local Polish policemen were murdered by the Russians in the Katyn massacre in 1940. After the war it was restored to Poland.

In 1975–1998 it was a part of the Bielsko-Biała Voivodeship and since 1999 it belongs to Silesian Voivodeship.

== Twin towns – sister cities ==
See twin towns of Gmina Strumień.
