= List of people from Silesia =

This is a list of notable people from Silesia.

== Nobel laureates ==
- Theodor Mommsen (1902, literature)
- Philipp Lenard (1905, physics)
- Eduard Buchner (1907, chemistry)
- Paul Ehrlich (1908, medicine)
- Gerhart Hauptmann (1912, literature)
- Fritz Haber (1918, chemistry)
- Friedrich Bergius (1931, chemistry)
- Carl von Ossietzky (1935, peace)
- Gerhard Domagk (1939, medicine)
- Otto Stern (1943, physics)
- Kurt Alder (1950, chemistry)
- Max Born (1954, physics)
- Maria Goeppert-Mayer (1963, physics)
- Konrad Bloch (1964, medicine)
- Johannes Georg Bednorz (1987, physics)
- Hans Georg Dehmelt (1989, physics)
- Reinhard Selten (1994, economics)
- Günter Blobel (1999, medicine)
- Olga Tokarczuk (2018, literature)

== Alphabetical order ==
=== A ===
- Erich Abraham, officer
- Andreas Acoluthus, theologian and orientalist
- Melchior Adam, literary historian
- bishop Stanisław Adamski
- Joy Adamson (born Friederike Victoria Gessner), naturalist and writer
- Eufemia von Adlersfeld-Ballestrem, novelist
- Kurt Alder, chemist
- Henryk Alszer, soccer player
- Johann Baptist Alzog, theologian and historian
- Zygmunt Anczok, soccer player
- Adolf Anderssen, chess grandmaster
- Georg Graf von Arco, physicist, radio pioneer
- Hans-Jürgen von Arnim, general
- Iris von Arnim, fashion designer
- Hans Erasmus Aßmann, statesman and poet
- Andreas von Aulock, colonel
- Hubertus von Aulock, general
- Walter Arndt, zoologist and physician

=== B ===
- Paul Baender, politician and chess player
- Adolf Aron Baginsky, pediatrician
- John Baildon, Scottish pioneer in metallurgy in Silesia
- Michael Ballack, soccer player
- the House of Ballestrem, de, pl
- Hans Baluschek, painter
- Jan Banaś, soccer player
- Franz Bardon, occultist
- Walter Bathe, swimmer
- bishop Herbert Bednorz
- Johannes Georg Bednorz, physicist
- Hans Bellmer, painter and sculptor
- Benedict of Poland, explorer
- Henryk Bereska; pl, de, translator and poet
- Max Berg, architect
- Friedrich Bergius, chemist
- Saul Berlin, scholar
- Gottfried Bermann, publisher
- cardinal Adolf Bertram
- Petr Bezruč, poet
- von Bibran-Modlau family
- Albert Bielschowsky, literary historian
- Max Bielschowsky, neuropathologist
- Horst Bienek, writer
- Stanisław Bieniasz, writer; pl
- Elżbieta Bieńkowska, politician, deputy prime minister of Poland
- Iva Bittová, violinist, singer, and composer
- rev. Franciszek Blachnicki
- William Blandowski, zoologist and mining engineer
- Leszek Blanik, gymnast
- Barbara Blida, politician
- Konrad Emil Bloch, biochemist
- Josef Block, painter
- Günter Blobel, biologist
- Fannie Bloomfield Zeisler, pianist
- Maurice Bloomfield, philologist
- Friedrich Blühmel; de
- Krystyna Bochenek, politician
- Hermann Boehm, admiral
- Sebastian Boenisch, soccer player
- Bishop Bernard Bogedain
- Lothar Bolz, politician
- Dietrich Bonhoeffer, theologian
- Karl Bonhoeffer, psychiatrist
- Karl Friedrich Bonhoeffer, chemist
- Klaus Bonhoeffer, lawyer
- Ernst Borinski, sociologist
- Max Born, physicist
- Willibald Borowietz, general
- Arka Bożek, politician; pl
- Josef Božek, engineer and inventor
- Ernst-Joachim Bradel, colonel
- Walter Brom, soccer player
- Lucjan Brychczy, soccer player
- Ignatz Bubis, politician
- Andrzej Buncol, soccer player
- Agata Buzek, actress
- Jan Buzek, physician and politician
- Jerzy Buzek, engineer and politician, prime minister of Poland
- Józef Buzek, economist and politician
- Jan Bystroń, linguist
- Jan Stanisław Bystroń, sociologist

=== C ===
- Ernst Cassirer, philosopher
- Ewald Cebula, soccer player
- Blessed Ceslaus; (bł. Czesław Odrowąż), Dominican friar
- Dietrich von Choltitz, general
- Jerzy Chromik, long-distance runner
- rev. Jan Piotr Chrząszcz; pl, de, historian
- Claudia Ciesla, female model
- Gerard Cieślik, soccer player
- Ferdinand Cohn (1828–1898), biologist
- Maria Cunitia (Cunitz) (1610–1664), astronomer
- Richard Courant, mathematician
- Johannes Crato von Krafftheim (1519–1585), imperial physician
- bishop Andrzej Czaja; pl
- Herbert Czaja, politician
- Richard Czaya; de, chess master

=== D ===
- Kurt Daluege, SS-general, Deputy Protector of Bohemia and Moravia
- Frank Damrosch, music conductor and educator
- Ernst Degner, motorcycle road racer
- Hans Georg Dehmelt, physicist, Nobel Prize laureate
- Hans Karl Graf von Diebitsch-Sabalkanski (Graf Ivan Ivanovich Dibich-Zabalkansky), Russian field marshal
- cardinal Melchior von Diepenbrock, Prince-Bishop of Breslau
- Leopold Wilhelm von Dobschütz, general
- the House of Henckel von Donnersmarck
- Hans-Jürgen Dörner, soccer player and coach
- Bernard Drzyzga; pl, colonel
- Ireneusz Dudek; pl, blues vocalist
- Jerzy Dudek, soccer player
- Rafał Dutkiewicz, politician
- Ewald Dytko, soccer player
- Wojciech Dzieduszycki; pl, count
- Johann Dzierzon, apiarist

=== E ===
- Katja Ebstein, singer
- Franz Eckert, musician who composed the national anthem of Japan
- Paul Ehrlich (1854–1915), physiologist
- Joseph Freiherr von Eichendorff, poet
- Bernd Eistert, chemist
- Norbert Elias (1897–1990), sociologist
- Józef Elsner, composer, music teacher and theoretician
- Emin Pasha (Isaak Eduard Schnitzer), physician
- Leszek Engelking, writer, poet, translator, scholar
- Berthold Englisch, chess master
- Anzelm Ephorinus; pl, physician
- Johann Samuel Ersch, bibliographer

=== F ===
- Eugeniusz Faber, soccer player
- Nikolaus von Falkenhorst, general
- Gottfried Bermann Fischer, publisher
- Grzegorz Fitelberg, conductor, violinist and composer
- Walenty Fojkis; pl, politician
- Jan Foltys, chess master
- Emanuel Aloys Förster, composer
- Friedrich Heinrich Ferdinand Leopold von Forcade de Biaix (1747–1808), Royal Prussian lieutenant colonel, Knight of the Order of Pour le Mérite
- Friedrich Wilhelm Ferdinand Ernst Heinrich von Forcade de Biaix (1787–1835), Royal Prussian major and Knight of the Iron Cross 2nd Class
- Friedrich Wilhelm Leopold Konstantin Quirin, Baron von Forcade de Biaix (1784–1840), Royal Prussian major, Knight of the Iron Cross, Knight of the Order of St. John Bailiwick of Brandenburg (1817), Royal Prussian Chamberlain, and Castellan of Neuenrade in the County of Mark
- Rudolf Fränkel, architect
- Heinz Fraenkel-Conrat, biochemist
- Egon Franke, fencer
- Zecharias Frankel, historian
- Gustav Freytag, writer
- Fritz von Friedlaender-Fuld; de (1858–1917), industrialist
- Johnny Friedlaender (1912–1992), painter
- Max Friedlaender (1852–1934), musicologist
- Carl Friedländer (1847–1887), bacteriologist
- Max Friedländer (1829–1872), journalist
- Max Jakob Friedländer (1867–1958), art historian
- Walter Friedländer (1873–1966), art historian
- Anni Friesinger-Postma, speed skater
- Willy Fritsch, actor
- rev. August Froehlich
- Radek Fukala, historian
- Jan Furtok, soccer player

=== G ===
- Hubert Gad, soccer player
- Christian Ganczarski, terrorist
- archbishop Józef Gawlina
- Dan Gawrecki, historian
- Adam Gdacjusz, writer
- Adam Abraham von Gaffron und Oberstradam, Danish general
- Gunther Gebel-Williams, circus performer, animal trainer
- Oscar Gelbfuhs, chess master
- Rudolf Christoph Freiherr von Gersdorff, general
- Eugeniusz Get-Stankiewicz; pl, sculptor
- Edmund Giemsa, soccer player
- Georg von Giesche; de, merchant and manufacturer
- Karl Gilg, chess master
- Krzysztof Globisz, actor
- rev. Joseph Glowatzki; de, politician
- Karl Godulla, industrialist
- Maria Goeppert-Mayer, physicist
- Eugen Goldstein, physicist
- Kurt Goldstein, neurologist
- Robert Gonera, actor
- Grzegorz Gerwazy Gorczycki, composer, musician
- Jerzy Gorgoń, soccer player
- Emil Görlitz; de, soccer player
- Jerzy Gorzelik, politician
- Rudolf von Gottschall, poet, dramatist, chess master
- Wilhelm Góra, soccer player
- Halina Górecka, athlete (sprinter)
- Henryk Górecki, composer
- Joachim Grallert, watchmaker and jeweler
- Heinrich Graetz, historian
- Jerzy Grotowski, theatre director
- Friedrich Grundmann; pl, businessman, co-founder of Katowice
- Ignatz Grünfeld; pl, architect
- Andreas Gryphius, poet
- Joanna Gryzik von Schomberg-Godula; pl, (Johanna Gräfin von Schaffgotsch); de, industrialist
- Karol Grzesik; pl, politician
- Bernhard Grzimek, zoologist
- cardinal Henryk Gulbinowicz
- Torsten Gütschow, soccer player

=== H ===
- the House of Habsburg; Branch of Toscania/Teschen
- Fritz Haber, chemist
- Stanisław Hadyna; pl, composer
- Richard Hanke, soccer player
- Daniel Harrwitz, chess master
- Alfred Hauptmann; de, neurologist
- Gerhart Hauptmann, dramatist
- Felix Hausdorff, mathematician
- Saint Hedwig of Andechs; (św. Jadwiga Śląska), Duchess of Silesia (1174–1243)
- Johann Heermann, poet and hymnwriter
- Sigfried Held, soccer player and coach
- Henry the Bearded, duke
- Henry II the Pious, duke
- Henry III the White, duke
- Henry IV Probus, duke
- Lothar Herbst; pl, poet
- Max Herrmann-Neisse; pl, de, writer
- Richard Herrmann, soccer player
- Arno Herzig; de, historian
- Dieter Hildebrandt, kabarettist
- Moses Hirschel, writer and chess master
- Ludwik Hirszfeld, microbiologist
- cardinal August Hlond; Primate of Poland
- Hans Heinrich XV von Hochberg, prince
- Karl Höfer, general
- Otto Höhne, general
- Christian Hoffmann von Hoffmannswaldau, poet and municipal politician
- Prince Adolf of Hohenlohe-Ingelfingen, nobleman, soldier, and politician
- Prince Kraft of Hohenlohe-Ingelfingen, nobleman and general
- August, Prince of Hohenlohe-Öhringen, general, industrialist, landowner and mining business people
- Karl Eduard von Holtei; poet and actor
- Richard Holtze; szl, politician, co-founder of Katowice
- Walther von Holzhausen, chess master
- Bernhard von Hülsen, general
- Herbert Hupka, politician
- Saint Hyacinth; (św. Jacek Odrowąż), Dominican friar, called the Apostle of the North

=== I ===
- Salomon Isaac; pl, merchant

=== J ===
- Anton Jadasch; de, politician
- Lech Janerka, composer
- Janosch, children's writer
- Michael Jary, composer
- Grzegorz Jarzyna; pl, theatre director
- Otylia Jędrzejczak, swimmer
- Jens Jeremies, soccer player
- Moritz Jursitzky, writer

=== K ===
- Ryszard Kaczmarek; pl, historian
- Zbigniew Kadłubek; pl, classical philologist
- Helmut Kajzar; pl, playwright, theatre director
- Theodor Kalide, sculptor
- David Kalisch, writer and humorist
- bishop Maximilian Kaller
- Theodor Kaluza, mathematician and physicist
- Tomasz Kamusella, linguist
- Manfred Kanther, politician
- Anna Louisa Karsch, poet
- Adolf Kaschny; pl, politician
- Georg Katzer, composer
- Lars Kaufmann, handball player
- Bernhard Kempa; de, handball player
- Alfred Kerr, art critic
- Jan Kidawa-Błoński; pl, film director
- Leon Kieres, historian
- Wojciech Kilar, composer
- Gustav Kirchhoff, physicist
- Martin Kirschner, surgeon
- August Kiss, sculptor
- Eckart Klein; de, social scientist
- Norbert Klein, Grand Master of the Teutonic Order (1923–1933)
- Otto Klemperer, conductor and composer
- Karl Ludwig Klose; de, historian
- Miroslav Klose, soccer player
- Samuel Benjamin Klose; de, historian
- Baladine Klossowska, painter
- Bernhard Adalbert Emil Koehne, botanist
- Alexander Kohut, orientalist
- Józef Kokot; pl, soccer player
- Heinz Kokott, general
- Jan Jakub Kolski, film director and writer
- cardinal Bolesław Kominek
- Jerzy Konikowski, chess master
- Richard Konwiarz; architect
- Kopaynski or Kopanski family
- cardinal Georg von Kopp
- Rudolf Koppitz, photographer
- Wojciech Korfanty, politician
- Julian Kornhauser, poet and literary critic
- Hubert Kostka, soccer player
- Jan Kotrč, chess master
- Viktor de Kowa, actor and singer
- Józef Kożdoń, Silesian autonomist
- Marek Krajewski, classical philologist and crime-story writer
- Adolf Kramer, chess master
- Paul Krause; de (December 27, 1905, † October 19, 1950), politician
- Emil Krebs, polyglot and sinologist
- Otto Kretschmer, commodore
- Rodolphe Kreutzer (father was born in Silesia), violinist and composer
- Henryk Kroll, politician
- Jan Kropidło, Duke of Opole, bishop of Chełmno, Kamień Pomorski, Kuyavia, Poznań, archbishop of Gniezno, Primate of Poland
- Rafał Kubacki, judo fighter and politician
- bishop Teodor Kubina; pl
- Richard Kubus, soccer player
- Michael Küchmeister von Sternberg, Grand Master of the Teutonic Order (1414–1422)
- Wojciech Kuczok, writer
- Hans Kudlich, politician and physician
- Quirinus Kuhlmann, poet and mystic
- Walter Kuhn, historian
- Friedrich Wilhelm Kuhnert, painter
- Jerzy Kukuczka; alpine and high-altitude climber
- Ernst Kunik; sv, historian and archeologist
- Theofil Kupka, politician
- Jan Kustos, politician
- Martin Kutta, mathematician
- Kazimierz Kutz, film director and politician

=== L ===
- Fritz Laband, soccer player
- Ferdinand Lassalle, politician
- Maciej Łagiewski; pl, historian
- Hans Lammers, politician
- Georg Landsberg, mathematician
- Otto Landsberg de, politician
- Benno Landsberger (1890–1968), linguist
- Franz Landsberger de, art historian
- Julius Landsberger de, orientalist and rabbi
- Horst Lange; de, writer
- Walter Laqueur, historian
- Ewald Latacz, Silesian politician
- Waldemar Legień, judoist
- Philipp Lenard, physicist
- Roman Lentner, soccer player
- Jan Liberda, soccer player
- the House of Lichnowsky
- Felix Graf von Lichnowsky, politician
- the House of Liechtenstein
- Felix Liebrecht, folklorist
- Paul Löbe, politician
- Friedrich von Logau, epigrammatist
- Daniel Casper von Lohenstein, diplomat and writer
- Stanisław Ligoń; pl, writer and painter
- Józef Lompa; pl, poet
- rev. Józef Londzin; pl, politician
- Fritz London, physicist
- Ortwin Lowack; de, lawyer and politician
- Fred Lowen, designer
- Erich Löwenhardt, fighter pilot, Oberleutnant
- Arthur Löwenstamm, rabbi
- Heinz A. Lowenstam, paleoecologist
- Włodzimierz Lubański, soccer player
- Emil Ludwig, writer
- Hans Lukaschek; de, politician
- Bobby E. Lüthge; de, screenwriter
- Alojzy Lysko, writer and politician
- Mariusz Łukasiewicz; pl, businessman
- Olgierd Łukaszewicz, actor
- Ondra Łysohorsky, poet

=== M ===
- Gottlieb Machate, chess master
- Wacław Maciejowski, historian
- Lech Majewski, film and theatre director
- Anton Franz Graf von Magnis; de, colonel
- Franz Magnis-Suseno; priest, missionary man and Indonesian public figure.
- Leonard Malik; pl, soccer player
- Richard Malik, soccer player
- Adam Małysz, ski jumper
- Andrzej Markowski; pl, linguist
- Martin of Opava, historian, archbishop of Gniezno, Primate of Poland
- Vojtěch Martínek; cs, writer
- Kurt Masur, conductor
- Michael Graf von Matuschka, politician
- Joachim Marx, soccer player
- Zygmunt Maszczyk, soccer player
- Franz Mauve, admiral
- Martin Max, soccer player
- Ludwig Meidner, painter
- cardinal Joachim Meisner
- Friedrich von Mellenthin, general
- Erich Mende, German politician of the FDP and CDU
- Gregor Mendel, biologist
- Adolph Menzel, painter
- Wolfgang Menzel, poet
- Blessed Maria Merkert
- Zbigniew Messner, economist, politician, prime minister of the Polish People's Republic
- Mieszko I Tanglefoot, Duke of Upper Silesia
- Jan Miodek, linguist
- Fr. Leopold Moczygemba, founder of the first Silesian-American parish in Panna Maria, Texas.
- Helga Molander, actress
- Helmuth James Graf von Moltke, jurist and politician
- Theodor Mommsen, historian and writer
- Gustaw Morcinek, writer
- Oskar Morgenstern, economist
- Ludwig Moshamer, architect
- Moritz Moszkowski, composer, pianist
- Czesław Mozil, singer
- Paul Mross, chess master
- Bogdan Musioł, bobsledder
- Joseph Musiol, politician
- bishop Jan Muskata

=== N ===
- bishop Nanker
- Benjamin Neukirch, poet
- Albert Neisser, physician
- Gustav Neumann, chess master
- Ernst Niekisch, politician
- Jaromír Nohavica, poet and songwriter
- Alfons Nossol, Roman Catholic archbishop
- Erwin Nyc, soccer player

=== O ===
- Teofil Ociepka; pl, naïve painter
- Jan Olbrycht, politician
- Reinhold Olesch, linguist
- Paul Ondrusch, sculptor
- Martin Opitz, poet
- Władysław Opolczyk, Duke of Opole
- Edmund Osmańczyk, writer
- Carl von Ossietzky, publicist
- Stanisław Oślizło, soccer player

=== P ===
- Franz Pacher, engineer
- Idzi Panic, historian
- Helmuth von Pannwitz, general and ataman
- Rudolf Pannwitz, writer and philosopher
- Eduard Pant, politician
- Joseph Partsch, geographer
- Ildefons Pauler, Grand Master of the Teutonic Order (1970–1988)
- rev. Paul Peikert; pl
- Teodor Peterek, soccer player
- the House of Piast
- Ryszard Piec, soccer player
- Wilhelm Piec, soccer player
- Antoni Piechniczek, soccer player and coach
- Franciszek Pieczka, actor
- bishop Tadeusz Pieronek
- Jerzy Pilch, writer
- David Pindur; cs, pl, historian
- Józef Pinior, politician
- Ferdinand Piontek, vicar
- Hans Piontek, politician
- Heinz Piontek, poet and writer
- Klaus Piontek, actor
- Leonard Piontek, soccer player
- Sepp Piontek, soccer player and coach
- Richard Pipes, historian
- Łukasz Piszczek, soccer player
- Bartholomaeus Pitiscus, mathematician and astronomer
- Marek Plawgo, athlete
- the House of Pless
- Lukas Podolski, soccer player
- Ernest Pohl, soccer player
- Hugo von Pohl, admiral
- Ewald Stefan Pollok, historian
- Yosef Porat, chess master
- Hans Poelzig, architect
- Vincenz Priessnitz, hydrotherapist
- Alfred Pringsheim, mathematician
- Ernst Pringsheim Sr., physicist
- Ernst Pringsheim Jr., biochemist and botanist
- Nathanael Pringsheim, botanist
- Rudolf Pringsheim, railway magnate
- Maximilian von Prittwitz, general
- the House of Promnitz
- Alfons Proske, politician
- Igor Przegrodzki, actor
- Carl Friedrich von Pückler-Burghauss, military officer

=== R ===
- Friedrich Wilhelm von Reden, engineer
- Jan Reginek; pl, politician
- rev. Tomasz Reginek; pl, politician
- Eva Gabriele Reichmann, historian and sociologist
- Johannes Reinelt, known as Philo vom Walde, poet
- Hanna Reitsch, aviator
- Erwin Respondek, politician
- Bolko von Richthofen, archeologist
- Ferdinand von Richthofen, traveller, geographer
- Hermann von Richthofen, diplomat
- Lothar von Richthofen, fighter pilot
- Manfred von Richthofen, fighter pilot
- Wolfram von Richthofen, fighter pilot, General Field Marshal
- Ryszard Riedel, blues/rock vocalist
- Fritz Riemann, chess master
- Günther Rittau, camera operator and film director
- Horst Rittner, chess master
- Abraham Robinson, mathematician
- Julius Roger, entomologist and folklorist
- Ottomar Rosenbach, physician
- Philipp Roth, cellist
- Walenty Roździeński; pl, industrialist and poet
- Tadeusz Różewicz, poet
- Johann Christian Ruberg, pioneer in the metallurgy of zinc
- Hans-Ulrich Rudel, fighter pilot, colonel
- Andrzej Rudy, soccer player
- Otto Rüster, chess master
- Wanda Rutkiewicz, mountain climber
- Józef Rymer, politician

=== S ===
- Julius von Sachs, botanist
- Otto Sackur, chemist
- Valery Salov, chess grandmaster
- Saint John Sarkander, priest
- the House of Schaffgotsch
- Hans Ulrich von Schaffgotsch, general
- Hans Ulrich von Schaffgotsch: de, industrialist
- Raphael Schäfer, soccer player
- Reinhard Schaletzki, soccer player
- Robert Schälzky, Grand Master of the Teutonic Order (1936–1948)
- cardinal Leo Scheffczyk, theologian
- Theodor von Scheve, chess master
- bishop Emanuel von Schimonsky; de
- Friedrich Schleiermacher
- Ludwig Schmitt, chess master
- August Schneider; de, politician
- August Scholtis; de, pl, writer
- Arnold Schottländer, chess master
- Heinrich Schulz-Beuthen, composer
- Peter Schumann, artist, puppeteer, theatre director
- Johann Gottlieb Schummel; de, writer
- Theodor Emil Schummel, entomologist
- Caspar Schwenckfeld, theologian and writer
- Hanna Schygulla, actress
- Karl Sczodrok; pl, writer
- bishop Leopold von Sedlnitzky
- Josef von Sedlnitzky; de
- Paul Segieth; de, painter
- Oskar Seidlin, writer
- Reinhard Selten, economist
- Gustavus Sidenberg, financier
- Janusz Sidło, athlete
- Tomasz Sikora, biathlete
- Angelus Silesius, poet
- Edward Simoni; de, pan flute musician
- Gerhard Skrobek, sculptor
- archbishop Wiktor Skworc
- Aleksandra Śląska, actress
- Henryk Sławik, diplomat
- Bohdan Smoleń, comedian
- Michał Smolorz; pl, publicist
- Franciszek Smuda, soccer player and coach
- Monika Soćko, chess grandmaster
- Emanuel Sperner, mathematician
- Edith Stein, philosopher, Roman Catholic saint
- Hugo Steinhaus, mathematician
- Fritz Stern, historian
- Otto Stern, physicist
- Ernst Steinitz, mathematician
- Feliks Steuer, educationist
- Hyacinth Graf Strachwitz von Groß-Zauche und Camminetz, general
- Moritz von Strachwitz, writer
- Pavle Jurišić Šturm, Serbian general
- Czesław Suszczyk, soccer player
- Carl Gottlieb Svarez, jurist
- Dariusz Świercz, chess grandmaster
- Waldemar Świerzy, poster artist
- rev. Józef Szafranek; pl, politician
- Karina Szczepkowska-Horowska, chess grandmaster
- Thomas Szczeponik, politician
- rev. Leopold Szersznik (Leopold Jan Šeršník); pl, bibliophile
- Sławomir Szmal, handball player
- Józef Szmidt, athlete
- Zygfryd Szołtysik, soccer player
- rev. Emil Szramek; pl (born Emil Michael Schramek)
- Edward Szymkowiak, soccer player

=== T ===
- Siegbert Tarrasch, chess grandmaster
- Max Tau, writer
- Adam Taubitz, musician
- Johannes Thiele, chemist
- Wolfgang Thierse, politician
- Georg Thomalla, actor
- Harry Thürk, writer
- prince-bishop Johannes V. Thurzo; de
- Olga Tokarczuk, writer
- Henryk Tomaszewski, mime
- Klaus Töpfer, politician
- Alfons Tracki, priest
- Ludwig Traube, physician
- Moritz Traube, biochemist
- Wilhelm Traube, chemist
- Oscar Troplowitz, pharmacist, inventor of Nivea
- rev. Jiří Třanovský, pastor and hymnwriter, the "Luther of the Slavs"
- Paul Tschackert, theologian and historian
- Szczepan Twardoch; pl, writer
- Sebastian Tyrała, soccer player

=== U ===
- Tomáš Ujfaluši, soccer player
- Alexander Ulfig; de, philosopher and sociologist
- Arnold Ulitz; de, writer
- rev. Carl Ulitzka; de, politician
- Kurt Urbanek; de, politician
- Zacharias Ursinus, theologian and author of the Heidelberg Catechism

=== V ===
- Julius von Verdy du Vernois, general and military writer
- Hieronymus Vietor, printer and publisher
- Ingmar Villqist; sv, writer

=== W ===
- Andrzej Waligórski; pl, actor and poet
- Henryk Waniek; pl, painter and writer
- Walter Warzecha, admiral
- Krzysztof Warzycha, soccer player
- Franz Waxman, composer
- Martin Websky; de, mineralogist
- Karl Weigert, pathologist
- Erich Weinitschke, chess master
- Edmund Weiss, astronomer
- Friedrich Weißler, lawyer
- rev. Augustin Weltzel; pl, historian
- Henry Wenceslaus, Duke of Oels-Bernstadt, Governor of Silesia (1629–1639)
- Carl Wernicke, neurologist
- archbishop Stefan Wesoły; pl
- Robert Więckiewicz, actor
- Ernest Wilimowski, soccer player
- Wincenty of Kielcza, poet
- Franz von Winckler; de, industrialist
- Johann Heinrich Winckler, physicist and philosopher
- Hubert von Tiele-Winckler; de, industrialist
- Eva von Tiele-Winckler; de, diakonissa
- Walter Winkler, soccer player
- Witelo ca.1230-ca.1300, physicist
- Paul Wittich, mathematician and astronomer
- Erwin von Witzleben, field marshal
- Peter Wlast, palatine
- Gerard Wodarz, soccer player
- Erich Peter Wohlfarth, physicist
- Józef Wojaczek, priest, member of the Mariannhill Missionaries.
- Rafał Wojaczek, poet
- Balduin Wolff, drawer and painter
- Konstanty Wolny; pl, politician
- Johann Gottlob Worbs; de, historian
- Jerzy Wostal, soccer player
- Dariusz Wosz, soccer player
- Remus von Woyrsch, general
- Tomasz Wylenzek, canoer
- Klaus Wyrtki, geophysicist

=== Y ===
- Peter Graf Yorck von Wartenburg, jurist and politician

=== Z ===
- Rudolf Žáček; cs, historian
- Adam Zagajewski, poet
- Vilém Závada; cs, poet
- Jolanta Zawadzka, chess grandmaster
- Karl Abraham von Zedlitz, politician
- Hans Zenker, admiral
- Alfons Zgrzebniok; pl, military officer and politician
- Jerzy Ziętek, politician
- Krystian Zimerman, pianist
- archbishop Damian Zimoń
- Benedict Zuckermann, scientist
- Arnold Zweig, writer
- Stefanie Zweig, writer

== The major Silesian cities ==
- Bielsko-Biała
- Bohumín
- Brzeg
- Bruntál
- Bytom
- Cieszyn
- Chorzów
- Frýdek-Místek
- Gliwice
- Głogów
- Görlitz
- Hoyerswerda
- Jelenia Góra
- Jeseník
- Katowice
- Karviná
- Kłodzko
- Kluczbork
- Krnov
- Legnica
- Lubin
- Oleśnica
- Opava
- Opole
- Ostrava
- Mysłowice
- Nysa
- Prudnik
- Pszczyna
- Racibórz
- Ruda Śląska
- Rybnik
- Tarnowskie Góry
- Tychy
- Wałbrzych
- Wrocław
- Zabrze
- Zielona Góra
- Żagań

== Literature ==
- Norman Davies and Roger Moorhouse: Microcosm: Portrait of a Central European City, London: Jonathan Cape, 2002. ISBN 0-224-06243-3
- Marek Czapliński, Elżbieta Kaszuba, Gabriela Wąs, Rościsław Żerelik: Historia Śląska, Wydawnictwo Uniwersytetu Wrocławskiego, 2002. ISBN 83-229-2213-2
- Hugo Weczerka: Handbuch der historischen Stätten: Schlesien. Stuttgart: Alfred Kröner Verlag, 2003. ISBN 3-520-31602-1.
- Historia Górnego Śląska, ed. Joachim Bahlcke, Dan Gawrecki, Ryszard Kaczmarek, Dom Współpracy Polsko-Niemieckiej, Gliwice 2011. ISBN 978-83-60470-41-1.
- Arno Herzig, Krzysztof Ruchniewicz, Małgorzata Ruchniewicz: Śląsk i jego dzieje, Wydawnictwo Via Nova, Wrocław 2012. ISBN 978-83-60544-91-4

== See also ==
- List of Poles
- List of Germans
- List of Czechs
- List of Austrians
