= Rudolf Pitschak =

Czech-German chess player

Rudolf Pitschak (5 August 1902 – 23 September 1988) was a Czech-German chess master.

Born in Rumburk (Rumburg), he once was the head of the Brünn (Brno) German Chess Club. He played in Silesian Chess Congress, where he tied for 3rd-4th at Gleiwitz 1927 (Ludwig Schmitt won), took 3rd at Reichenbach 1928 (Gottlieb Machate won), and took 2nd, behind Heinz Foerder, at Breslau 1930.

Pitschak won at Venice 1929, finished second to Flohr at Králičky 1929, tied for 3rd-4th at Bílina 1930 (Foerder won), took 7th at Mnichovo Hradiště 1930 (Efim Bogoljubow won), took 11th at Moravská Ostrava (Mährisch Ostrau) 1933 (Ernst Grünfeld won), tied for fourth at Bad Liebwerda (Lázně Libverda) 1934, the 13th DSV-ch, Salo Flohr won), tied for 7-8th at Konstantinsbad (Konstantinovy Lázně) 1935 (the 14th DSV-ch, Karl Gilg won), and tied for 2nd-3rd at Vienna 1943 (Hietzing, Lešnik won).

After World War II, Pitschak played at Cleveland in the 1957 (U.S. Open Chess Championship) where he drew a game with Bobby Fischer.
