= Walter Kuhn =

Austrian-born German folklorist (1903-1983)

Walter Kuhn (27 September 1903 – 5 August 1983), was an Austrian-born German folklorist (German: Volkskundler), historian and Ostforscher. Prior to World War II, Kuhn belonged to the German minority in Poland. His academic work specialized in German minorities outside Germany, particularly in the area of Ukraine, especially Volhynia. He focused his research on German language islands. In 1936, Kuhn moved to Germany to take a professorship at the University of Breslau. In 1940, he joined the Nazi Party. During the war, he advised various Nazi plans of ethnic cleansing aimed at Jews, Poles and their replacement by German settlers from further east.

Kuhn continued his academic work post-war in West Germany, becoming a professor at the University of Hamburg and an expert in the German Ostsiedlung. He retired in 1968, moving to Salzburg, where he died in 1983. Kuhn's post-war work was internationally recognized, but received some criticism from Polish scholars in particular. (Note: Kuhn's historical findings on geographical settlement have not only found recognition in Germany, but—with certain, sometimes justified, restrictions—also in Poland. People were even interested in Kuhn's History of the German Eastern Settlement in Modern Times for comparative reasons in western countries such as Ireland and Canada, and French scholar Charles Higounet from Bordeaux, who stayed in Hamburg as a visiting professor and became friends with Walter Kuhn, thanked him in the foreword to his book, The German Eastern Settlement in the Middle Ages (1986) for "providing new insights.")

Although they were largely ignored or denied in the post-war period, Kuhn's close connections to National Socialism before and during World War II have come under increased scholarly scrutiny since the publication of Michael Burleigh's Germany Turns Eastward (1988). Kuhn's pre-war work has been linked to anti-Semitism, anti-Slavism, and promoting a belief in German superiority.

== Biography ==
=== Early life and studies ===
Kuhn was born in 1903 in the town of Bielitz (Bielsko) in Austrian Silesia, in a German-speaking enclave surrounded by Polish speakers. Kuhn's parents belonged to the Away from Rome!-movement and were both supporters of the unification of Austria with Germany. As a boy, Kuhn distributed flowers to soldiers guarding against Polish youths who were celebrating the Assassination of Franz Ferdinand, which Michael Burleigh argues shows an early consciousness for national issues. After the First World War, this territory was annexed to Poland, confronting Kuhn with the issue of German enclaves in Slavic territory while still young, and Kuhn was, therefore, a Polish citizen in the interwar period. Kuhn met several later scholarly collaborators on matters of German minorities in Eastern Europe after joining the Wandervogel movement in Bielitz in 1919. While he initially studied electrical engineering in Graz till 1927, he later attended universities in Vienna and Tübingen.

Kuhn began to study German settlement in Eastern Europe while he was a student, including undertaking several trips to Poland and Ukraine and making several publications. In 1926 Kuhn went to Ukraine (Volhynia) with several other members from the Wandervogel movement funded by various German agencies where he studied German communities and praised "the strength and beauty of German Volkstum". While the official purpose of the visit was to study German communities, Michael Burleigh writes that it served mostly to reinforce the participants' notions of German superiority towards Polish people. Kuhn wrote five of the eight essays about the expedition that were subsequently published in the journal Deutsche Blätter in Polen. Kuhn argued that more recent German enclaves in Eastern Europe, because they felt themselves to be superior to the surrounding Slavs, were less like to intermarry or become "de-Germanised", as opposed to older enclaves which were more prone to assimilation. Kuhn viewed himself and his colleagues as "bearers of civilization" and his goal as "to transform the instinctive feeling of superiority and pride towards the surrounding peoples (…) into a true national consciousness". Unlike the formerly Prussian members of the expedition, Kuhn argued that the Volhynian Germans were true Germans and should be allowed to develop on their own under the guidance of more mature language islands, which Winson Chu takes to mean Kuhn's own hometown of Bielitz/Bliesko. Kuhn also secretly worked for the organization Volksbund für das Deutschtum im Ausland to verify the population numbers on the German minority in Poland given by the Polish government. Kuhn, writing under the pseudonym Andreas Mückler, claimed in a publication of the Viennese Institut für Statistik der Minderheitsvölker that the Polish census of 1921 had omitted half of Poland's German population.

Even before he had begun his doctoral studies, Kuhn was known as a scholar of language islands. Kuhn received his doctorate in 1931 from the University of Vienna, writing on German language islands in Poland. Kuhn's first attempt at achieving an academic position was a failure, and he returned to Bielitz, but Kuhn received a job as an assistant to Viktor Kauder at the Deutsche Kulturbund in Katowice (Kattowitz) in 1932. He received this job through the help of Otto Ulitz, leader of the German minority in Upper Silesia, and Eduard Pant, a German-Polish politician and member of the Sejm. While living in Poland, Kuhn was a sympathizer of the pro-National Socialist Jungdeutsche Partei.

=== Career under the Nazis ===
Alexander Pinwinkler writes that Kuhn's career benefited greatly from the Nazi's taking of power in 1933. Kuhn engaged in many activities in nationalist-conservative and Nazi organizations and participated in numerous Nazi organized conferences. Beginning in 1934, Kuhn's work was supported monetarily by Nord- und Ostdeutsche Forschungsgemeinschaft (NOFG), a Nazi research organisation. Kuhn served as a liaison between the leaders of the Deutscher Volksbund in Poland, who secretly supported German revisionist politics towards Poland, and scholars in Germany, performed various ethnographic work and promoting the interests of the German minority to the Volksbund für das Deutschtum im Ausland.

Kuhn became a professor for "folklore and East-German folk-ways" at the University of Breslau in 1936. His naming to this post was somewhat controversial, as Kuhn was not seen as a representative folklorist and had not written a habilitation; according to Alexander Pinwinkler and Ingo Haar, Kuhn achieving the professorship was mostly the work of nationally influential pro-Nazi historians Albert Brackmann and Hermann Aubin rather than the faculty in Breslau itself. In a report likely from the summer of 1936, Nazi Heinrich Harmjanz described Kuhn as a "good comrade-in-arms" (guter Kamarad) who was "fixed and secure in the world view of the Third Reich" (fest und sicher in der Weltanschauung des dritten Reiches). Throughout the thirties and into the war, Kuhn was seen as a "foreign-German National-Socialist". A secret protocol created for the Sicherheitsdienst by SS-Untersturmbahnführer Ernst Birke in 1937 noted that Kuhn's work supported the ideals of the German Youth Movement and ethnic politics, but that Kuhn was not interested in politics and would "see 'any closer connection to a certain political direction' as a disturbance of his work". Birke hoped that Kuhn's reticence about politics could be loosened by his connections to the group around historian Hermann Aubin.

In 1937, Kuhn took over duties as director of the Atlas der Deutschen Volkskunde. In 1939, Kuhn became director of the Silesian Society for Folk Studies and a representative of the NOFG at the Upper Education Office of the Nazi Party. He was also honored with the "Nikolaus-Kopernikus Prize" of the Johann-Wolfgang von Goethe-Stiftung, a prize for Volksdeutsche, for his academic publications. By the start of World War II, Kuhn was a famous scholar.

Kuhn was part of an irredentist training group set up on 23 February 1939 in Poznań under leadership of Richard Bloch that was housed in local German Consulate, the goal of the group was to organize evening lectures on techniques of intelligence-gathering work. (Note: Mniejszość niemiecka w Wielkopolsce w latach 1919-1939 page 330 Dariusz Matelski - Wydawnictwo Naukowe Universytetu Adama Mickiewicz. UAM, 1997 Centralą irredenty niemieckiej w województwie poznańskim był lokal Niemieckiego Konsulatu Generalnego w Poznaniu, w którym 23 II 1939 r. powołano tzw. grupę szkoleniową pod kierownictwem Richarda Blocha (tworzyli ją ponadto Helmut Haberhorn, Walther Kuhn i Herbert Czarnecki. Jej zadaniem było organizowanie tzw. "Schulungsabend", na których omawiano m. in. "technikę pracy informacyjno-wywiadowczej Center of German irredentist movement in Posnan membership was housed in the German Consulate in Poznań, in which on 23 II 1939 a training group under the leadership of Richard Block was founded (it was formed also by Helmut, Haberhorn, Walther Kuhn, and Herbert Czarnecki). Its goal was to organize so-called "Schulungsabend", during which "techniques of intelligence and information gathering work" were discussed.) Kuhn was in constant contact with the Deutsches Auslands-Institut, which worked on behalf of German Sicherheitsdienst, the German intelligence agency of the SS and the Nazi Party; in some cases Kuhn ranked people's migratory racial worthiness for Germanization based on a combination of present and historical circumstances. (Note: Szczególnie intensywną działalność rozwijał Walter Kuhn, zamieszkały do 1936 r. w Bielsku. Kuhn pozostawal w stalym kontakcie z Deutsches Ausland Institut w Stuttgarcie.Instytut ten, wykonujac zlecenia SD zbieral i opracowywal przy pomocy naukowcow, rekrutujacych sie z ze srodowisk mniejszosci, rekrutujących się ze środowisk mniejszości niemieckiej za granicami Rzeszy, materiały mające poważne znaczenie dla wywiadu. SS, czarna gwardia Hitlera - page 229 Ksiazka i Wiedza Karol Grünberg - 1984 especially intensive activity was carried out by Walter Kuhnw who lived in Bielsk till 1936. Kuhn remained in constant contact with Deutsches Ausland Institut w Stuttgart.This institute was following orders by SD and gathered and compiled with help of scholars, recruited from German minorities located beyond Reich borders, materials that had significant importance for intelligence.)

=== Second World War ===
Following the annexation by Nazi Germany of his hometown of Bielitz (Bielsko), Kuhn applied to join the Nazi party on December 6, 1939. He was admitted on February 1, 1940. However, in 1941 Kuhn refused to take a position at the Reich University of Posen (a new German university that replaced the older Polish University of Poznań) despite persistent attempts to get him to take the position. Kuhn himself would later explain his refusal as due to the incompatibility of his research interests with the new position.

In 1939, Kuhn served as an advisor to the SS for the resettlement of ethnic Germans. He returned to German communities in Ukraine to assist in determining their "racial qualities" connected to Nazi plans of resettlement; the SS considered his reports in determining which ethnic Germans would be repatriated to Germany. Kuhn advised the resettlement of German villages as groups to areas of Poland that had similar climatic and soil characteristics to the areas they were taken from, but advised that villages that showed signs of in-breeding, sectarianism, or "spiritual sickness" should be broken up. In practice, the resettlement did not tend to follow Kuhn's suggestions, and regional and social differences between various groups of Polish Germans were ignored.

On September 29, 1939, Kuhn authored a position paper titled "German settlement areas beyond the old Reich Borders" for the German-Soviet Border Commission in which he argued that Germany should annex various areas of Poland that had not belonged to the German Empire based on their ethnic makeup. On October 11, 1939, the Prussian Privy State Archives published a memorandum titled "Germanization of Poznań and West Prussia" (German: Eindeutschung Posens und Westpreußens), authored by several German historians including Kuhn. The memorandum called for the immediate "resettlement" of 2.9 million Poles and Jews and their replacement with German settlers. The memorandum also called for the "removal of Jewry" and of elites, and the "reduction" (Minderung) of the total population, in order that the territory could be settled as Lebensraum by the state. In the winter of 1940, Kuhn served as an advisor to the Immigration Headquarters of the Sicherheitsdienst in Litzmannstadt (Łódź) for German settlers being resettled out of the Soviet-occupied parts of Poland and the General Government. Prior to the resettlement of Germans in these villages and homes, Poles had been deported to the General Government. Kuhn also advised on the "Germanization" of Slavic groups in Silesia: Kuhn argued that many German-speakers in Silesia were in fact Polish immigrants to the territory who had adopted German and replaced Germans who had moved to the West.

In 1943 he was conscripted into the Wehrmacht and was captured by the British in 1944. He remained a prisoner until 1947; according to Kuhn, this was because as the British sent him to a re-education camp.

=== Postwar career ===
Kuhn was released from British captivity in 1947. Kuhn's wife had fled from Breslau (now Wrocław, Poland) to Magdeburg, but had not brought any of Kuhn's manuscripts, notes, or books with her. Kuhn briefly considered emigrating to Chicago in the United States due to financial troubles before Hermann Aubin arranged for him to take a temporary teaching position at the University of Hamburg that same year. Although before World War II Kuhn had belonged to a network of German folklorists from Bielitz (Bielsko), he was the only one of them to be able to continue his academic career after the war. The German language islands that Kuhn had studied before the war had been destroyed by the resettlement policy of the Nazis and the expulsion of Germans from Eastern Europe after World War II, so Kuhn changed his focus to the history of German settlement in the region (Ostsiedlung). Kuhn's pre-war work came under critical fire, especially from the folklorist Ingeborg Weber-Kellermann, who accused him of ethnocentrism and of deliberately polarizing the differences between Germans and Poles. Kuhn's activities advising the SS during the war were not brought up, however. Kuhn himself never acknowledged any wrongdoing, instead bemoaning the loss of his wartime work and framing himself as a victim.

In 1955, Kuhn became professor for the history of German settlement and folklore at the University of Hamburg, a position that was specifically created for him by Hermann Aubin. While Kuhn initially focused on German settlement in the modern period, following publications in the mid 1950s, he came to focus more on medieval German settlement, particularly in Silesia and Poland. Kuhn went on to advise many dissertations, including after his retirement in 1968, and frequently functioned as a reviewer of Polish-language scholarly works. He was also involved in various scholarly organisations and received various honors. He was the head of the Kommission für die Geschichte der Deutschen in Polen from 1952 until 1964. Kuhn retired to Salzburg, where he continued to publish numerous scholarly works. Norbert Angermann identifies him as "the most significant historian of the German Ostsieldung" ("bedeutendster Historiker der deutschen Ostsiedlung") in the period before his death in 1983. Kuhn's connections to National Socialism before and during World War II would not become a topic of discussion until 1988, when Michael Burleigh published Germany Turns Eastward (1988).

== Scholarly appraisals and reception ==
=== Pre-war work ===
Writing in 2010, the Polish scholar Dariusz Chrobak characterizes Kuhn as a "pioneer" who founded the study of German language islands. Norbert Angermann argues that Kuhn's pre-war work was not influenced by the racial theories of the Nazis. However, other assessments are less favorable. Wilhelm Fielitz argues that Kuhn's pre-war work shows Social Darwinist, ethnocentric tendencies, although he also used modern field-work techniques. Alexander Pinwinkler writes that Kuhn's work approached the Nazi concept of a utopian "racially pure" state. Matthias Weber, Hans Hennig Hahn, and Kurt Dröge write that Kuhn's work on language islands as particularly apt to support concepts of imperialistic aggression. Christian Lübke noted a strong similarity the vocabulary of Nazi propaganda and the vocabulary of Kuhn and other contemporary German scholars engaged in studying Eastern Europe: as a specific example, Lübke notes that Kuhn published an article in 1939 in which he wrote about the "vital force inherent in German culture in the East" at a moment in which according to him Germans were engaged in "ethnic struggle".

Kuhn's focus on language islands had mostly been replaced by inter-ethnic studies by 1970, largely through the work of folklorist Ingeborg Weber-Kellermann and historian Walter Schlesinger. Hugo Weczerka, a former of student of Kuhn from Hamburg, writes that Kuhn's pre-war work remains useful in its collection of facts, but less so in their systematic comprehension of the situation of language islands. Although works such as Kuhn's continue to provide the fullest accounts of German minority populations in areas such as Volhynia, Heinke Kalinke writes that their use today "requires especially careful source criticism and contextualization in academic history" ("bedarf [...] besonders sorgfältiger Quellenkritik und wissenschaftsgeschichtlicher Kontextualisierung").

=== Post-war work ===
Kuhn's post-war work was mostly positively reviewed in his lifetime, but received some criticism, particularly from scholars in Poland. Writing retrospectively, Norbert Angermann writes that Kuhn always strove to be objective in his work, despite his emotional attachment to the subject. Hugo Weczerka, Kuhn's former student at Hamburg, writes that Kuhn's work on the Ostsiedlung is "of lasting value" (von bleibendem Wert), and he notes the positive reception of Kuhn's work in countries besides Germany, including, "with certain, to some extent justified qualifications" (mit gewissen, z.T. berechtigten Einschränkungen) in Poland. Weczerka nevertheless criticizes Kuhn's fixation on Deutschtum ("German national traditions") to the exclusion of the people surrounding German settlers and enclaves and notes that not everyone could agree to some of Kuhn's conclusions. As a specific example, Weczerka notes that one of Kuhn's maps in the Atlas zur Geschichte der deutschen Ostsiedlung (1958, edited by Wilfried Krallert) depicted the Masurians, Kashubians, Sorbs, and Upper Silesians as "groups that according to language and feeling of belonging have become German" (Nach Sprache und Zugehörigkeitsgefühl deutsch gewordene Gruppen). Holocaust scholars Debórah Dwork and Robert Jan van Pelt refer to Kuhn as representative of "first-rate German historians". They state that Kuhn is the writer of "excellent histories of the medieval development of Upper Silesia in general and of Auschwitz in particular", yet that he nevertheless mentions Auschwitz concentration camp only twice in his entire oeuvre.

Polish historian Michal Lis writes that Kuhn and other Ostforschung scholars in post-war West Germany continued to propagate historical and sociological myths aimed at undermining and questioning the Polish identity of the population of Upper Silesia. (Note: Polityka Republiki Federalnej Niemiec wobec polskiej ludności rodzimej na Ṡląsku w latach 1949-1990/91 Michał Lis Wydawnictwo Instytutu Śląskiego w Opolu, 1992 page 20.) Andrew Demshuk writes: "As professor for Siedlungsgeschichte (history of settlement) at the University of Hamburg, [Kuhn] dedicated his work [Geschichte der deutschen Ostsiedlung] to all who remained "faithful" (now to Heimat rather than Hitler) and wrote tales of German suffering through the ages under Slavic oppression." Stefan Guth writes that study of post-war works about Ostsiedlung by Kuhn leave no doubt that he remained loyal to his concentration on Germanness (Deutschtum) in his post-war works just as in the '30s. (Note: For example, see the 2015 work from Stefan Guth: Geschichte als Politik: Der deutsch-polnische Historikerdialog im 20. Jahrhundert, München: De Gruyter Oldenbourg, page 271.) Dariusz Przybytek names the Atlas zur Geschichte der deutschen Ostsiedlung by Kuhn and Willifried Krallert about German Ostsiedlung as having a "propagandic character". (Note: See: Kartografia historyczna Ślaka XVIII-XX wieku (Historical cartography of Ślak 18th-20th centuries), page 102. Dariusz Przybytek Wydawnictwo Uniwersytetu Wrocławskiego, 2002.)

== Selected publications by Kuhn ==
=== Scholarly monographs ===
- Kuhn, Walter (1930). Die jungen deutschen Sprachinseln in Galizien; ein Beitrag zur Methode der Sprachinselforschung. Mit einem Vorworte von Eduard Winter. Münster: Aschendorff.
- Kuhn, Walter (1934). Deutsche Sprachinselforschung : Geschichte, Aufgaben, Verfahren. Plauen im Vogtland: Wolff.
- Kuhn, Walter (1954). Siedlungsgeschichte Oberschlesiens. Würzburg: Oberschlesischer Heimatverlag.
- Kuhn, Walter (1955–57). Geschichte der deutschen Ostsiedlung in der Neuzeit, 2 Bde. Cologne, Graz: Böhlau.
- Kuhn, Walter (1968). Die deutschrechtlichen Städte in Schlesien und Polen in der ersten Hälfte des 13. Jahrhunderts. Marburg an der Lahn: J. G. Herder-Institut.
- Kuhn, Walter (1971). Beiträge zur schlesischen Siedlungsgeschichte. Munich: Delp.
- Kuhn, Walter (1973). Vergleichende Untersuchungen zur mittelalterlichen Ostsiedlung. Cologne, Vienna: Böhlau.
- Kuhn, Walter (1981). Geschichte der deutschen Sprachinsel Bielitz (Schlesien). Würzburg: Holzner Verlag.
- Kuhn, Walter (1984). Neue Beiträge zur schlesischen Siedlungsgeschichte : eine Aufsatzsammlung. Sigmaringen: J. Thorbecke.

=== As editor ===
- Kuhn, Walter; Aschenbrenner, Viktor; Lemberg, Eugen, eds. (1967). Die Deutschen und ihre östlichen Nachbarn: ein Handbuch. Frankfurt am Main: M. Diesterweg.

=== Scholarly articles ===
- Kuhn, Walter (1931). "Die Rußlanddeutschen". Volk und Rasse. 6 (1): 1–12.
- Kuhn, Walter (1975). "Westslawische Landesherren als Organisatoren der mittelalterlichen Ostsiedlung". In Schlesinger, Walter (ed.). Die deutsche Ostsiedlung des Mittelalters als Problem der europäischen Geschichte : Reichenau-Vorträge 1970–1972. Sigmaringen: J. Thorbecke. pp. 225–261.
- Kuhn, Walter (2016). "German Town Foundations in Western Pomerania". In Berend, Nora (ed.). The expansion of Central Europe in the Middle Ages. London: Taylor and Francis. pp. 113–148. ISBN 9781351890083.

=== Autobiographical writing ===
- Kuhn, Walter (1982). "Eine Jugend für die Sprachinselforschung. Erinnerungen". Jahrbuch der schlesischen Friedrich-Wilhelms-Universität zu Breslau. 23: 225–278.

== See also ==
- Ostforschung
- Drang nach Osten

== Bibliography ==
- Angermann, Norbert. "Walter Kuhn". Die ostdeutsche Bibliographie.
- Appelt, Heinrich (1985). "Review: Walter Kuhn: Neue Beiträge zur schlesischen Siedlungsgeschichte. Eine Aufsatzsammlung". Mitteilungen des Instituts für Österreichische Geschichtsforschung. 93 (3–4): 493. doi:10.7767/miog.1985.93.34.493.
- Burleigh, Michael (1988). Germany Turns Eastwards: A Study of Ostforschung in the Third Reich. Cambridge, New York: Cambridge University Press. ISBN 0521351200.
- Burleigh, Michael (1992). "Scholarship, State and Nation, 1918–45". In Breuilly, John (ed.). The State oF Germany: The National Idea in the Making, Unmaking and Remaking of a Modern Nation-State. London and New York: Longman. pp. 128–140. ISBN 0-582-07864-4.
- Burleigh, Michael (1997). Ethics and Extermination: Reflections on Nazi Genocide. Cambridge; New York: Cambridge University Press. ISBN 978-0-52158-816-4.
- Chrobak, Dariusz (2010). "Das Phänomen der Sprachinsel. Geschichte der ehemaligen deutschen Sprachinseln in Oberschlesien und Galizien". Studia Śląskie. 69.
- Chu, Winson (2012). The German minority in interwar Poland. Cambridge: Cambridge University Press. ISBN 9781107008304.
- Demshuk, Andrew (2012). The lost German East : forced migration and the politics of memory, 1945–1970. New York: Cambridge University Press. ISBN 9781107020733.
- Dwork, Debórah; van Pelt, Robert Jan (1996). Auschwitz, 1270 to the present. New York: Norton. ISBN 0393039331.
- Fielitz, Wilhelm (2008). "Walter Kuhn". In Haar, Ingo; Fahlbusch, Michael (eds.). Handbuch der völkischen Wissenschaften : Personen, Institutionen, Forschungsprogramme, Stiftungen. Munich: K.G. Saur. pp. 387–390. ISBN 9783598117787.
- Haar, Ingo (2000). Historiker im Nationalsozialismus : deutsche Geschichtswissenschaft und der "Volkstumskampf" im Osten. Göttingen: Vandenhoeck & Ruprecht. ISBN 352535942X.
- Haar, Ingo (2005). "German Ostforschung and Anti-Semitism". In Haar, Ingo; Fahlbusch, Michael (eds.). German Scholars and Ethnic Cleansing. New York and Oxford: Berghahn Books. pp. 1–27. ISBN 1-57181-435-3.
- Kalinke, Heinke (2015). "Sprachinselforschung". Online-Lexikon zur Kultur und Geschichte der Deutschen im östlichen Europa. Carl von Ossietzky Universität Oldenburg und Bundesinstitut für Kultur und Geschichte der Deutschen im östlichen Europa (BKGE).
- Krzoska, Markus (2003). "Deutsche Ostforschung – polnische Westforschung: Prolegomena zu einem Vergleich". Zeitschrift für Ostmitteleuropa-Forschung/Journal of East-Central European Studies. 52 (3): 399–419.
- Lübke, Christian (2017). "Germany's Growth to the East: from the Polabian Marches to Germania Slavica". In Loud, Graham A.; Staub, Martial (eds.). The making of medieval history. Woodbridge, Suffolk, UK: York Medieval Press. pp. 167–184. ISBN 978-1903153703.
- Michelsen, Jakob (2003). "Von Breslau nach Hamburg: Ostforscher am Historischen Seminar der Universität Hamburg nach 1945". In Hering, Rainer; Nicolaysen, Rainer (eds.). Lebendige Sozialgeschichte: Gedenkschrift für Peter Borowsky. Wiesbaden: Westdeutscher Verlag. pp. 659–681. ISBN 3-531-13717-4.
- Mühle, Eduard (2005). Für Volk und deutschen Osten. Der Historiker Hermann Aubin und die deutsche Ostforschung. Düsseldorf: Droste. ISBN 377001619X.
- Pinwinkler, Alexander (2009). "Walter Kuhn (1903–1983) und der Bielitzer "Wandervogel e. V.". Historisch-volkskundliche "Sprachinselforschung" zwischen nationalistischem Pathos und politischer Indienstnahme". Zeitschrift für Volkskunde. 105: 29–52.
- Rhode, Gotthold (1983). "Walter Kuhn (1903–1983): Ein Leben für die Sprachinselforschung und die Siedlungsforschung". Jahrbücher für Geschichte Osteuropas. 31 (4): 629–632. JSTOR 41046753.
- Schleier, Hans (1999). "German historiography under National Socialism: dreams of a powerful nation-state and German Volkstum come true". In Berger, Stefan; Donovan, Mark; Passmore, Kevin (eds.). Writing National Histories: Western Europe since 1800. London and New York: Routledge. pp. 176–188. ISBN 0-415-16426-5.
- Weber, Matthias; Hahn, Hans Hennig; Dröge, Kurt (1999). "Ostmitteleuropaforschung statt "deutsche Ostforschung"". Einblicke: Das Forschungsmagazin der Universität Oldenburg. 30.
- Weczerka, Hugo (2001). "Walter Kuhn (1903–1983): Eine biographische Würdigung". In Kessler, Wolfgang (ed.). Fünfzig Jahre Forschung zur Geschichte der Deutschen in Polen : die Historisch-Landeskundliche Kommission für Posen und das Deutschtum in Polen und die Kommission für die Geschichte der Deutschen in Polen 1950–2000. Herne: Stiftung Martin-Opitz-Bibliothek. pp. 75–82.
- Wolff, Larry (1994). Inventing Eastern Europe : the map of civilization on the mind of the enlightenment. Stanford, Calif.: Stanford University Press. ISBN 0804723141.
