= Adolf Kramer =

German chess player

Adolf Kramer (1871 – 10 January 1934) was a Silesian German chess master.

He played in DSB Congress. He tied for 10-12th at Munich 1900 (Hauptturnier A), took 8th at Breslau 1912 (Hauptturnier B), shared 2nd at Hamburg 1921 (elim.), tied for 4-6th at Bad Oeynhausen 1922 (elim.), and took 5th at Duisburg 1929 (Hauptturnier B).

Kramer also participated several times in Silesian Chess Congress. He shared 1st with Ertelt and beat him in play-off at Beuthen (Bytom) 1923, shared 1st with Bergmann and lost to him in play-off at Bad Salzbrunn (Szczawno-Zdrój) 1924, took 4th at Altheide Bad (Polanica-Zdrój) 1926 (Fritz Sämisch won), took 5th at Gleiwitz (Gliwice) 1927 (Ludwig Schmitt and Heinz Foerder won), and took 4th at Reichenbach (Dzierżoniów) 1928 (Gottlieb Machate won).

Adolf Kramer famously beat former World Chess Champion Capablanca at Tartu in 1914 in just 9 moves (Capablanca apparently had a cold during this game)
