= Ruberg =

Ruberg is a surname. Notable people with the surname include:

- Bo Ruberg (born 1985), American game studies scholar
- Endel Ruberg (1917–1989), Estonian-Canadian artist
- Johann Christian Ruberg (1746–1807), German inventor
