= Angermann =

Angermann is a surname. Notable people with the surname include:

- Erich Angermann (1927−1992), German historian
- Marianne Angermann (1904–1977), German biochemist
- Norbert Angermann (born 1936), German historian
- Peter Angermann (born 1945), German painter

== See also ==
- Angermann River, a former spelling of the Swedish Ångerman
