= Reinder van der Meulen =

Dutch linguist (1882–1972)

- Born: 28 May 1882; Rotterdam, Netherlands
- Died: 17 April 1972 (aged 89); Emmen, Netherlands
- Education: Leiden University; Leipzig University
- Known for: contribution to Baltic and Slavic studies, editing the Dictionary of the Dutch language
- Scientific career
- Thesis: Die Naturvergleiche in den Liedern und Totenklagen der Litauer (1907)
- Doctoral advisor: August Leskien
- Website: Reinder van der Meulen // Leiden University professors (in Dutch)

Reinder van der Meulen (Dutch pronunciation: [ˈrɛindər vɑn dər ˈmøːlə(n)]; 28 May 1882 – 17 April 1972) was a Dutch linguist. He received his doctorate in 1907. He was appointed a Member of the Royal Netherlands Academy of Arts and Sciences in 1925. From 1900 to 1907, he was in Leiden, then at the University of Leipzig where he studied Baltic and Slavic languages. Under the supervision of August Leskien, he defended his thesis on Nature comparisons in Lithuanian songs and laments (Die Naturvergleiche in der Liedern und Totenklagen der Litauer 1907, Lithuanian 1919, translated by M. Biržiška). From 1946 to 1952, he was Full Professor of Baltic and Slavic languages at Leiden University. In 1908 he visited Lithuania. He participated in the II general meeting of the Lithuanian Science Society, and was elected a corresponding member of this society. From 1907 to 1912 worked as a teacher. From 1912 to 1935, he edited the Dictionary of the Dutch Language (Woordenboek der Nederlandsche Taal). He published articles on Lithuanian onomastics and the Prussian language in the publications of the Royal Netherlands Academy of Arts and Sciences.

== Works ==
- Schaeken, Jos; Mikhailov, Nikolai (1998). "Die Briefe von A. Leskien an R. van der Meulen" (PDF). Res Balticae (in German). 3: 213–231 – via Schaeken.nl.

=== By Meulen ===
- Meulen, Reinder van der (1882). Woordenboek der nederlandsche taal. (Wörterbuch der niederländischen Sprache.) (holl.) (in Dutch). Nijhoff.
- van der Meulen, Reinder (1907). Die Naturvergleiche in den Liedern und Totenklagen der Litauer. Leiden: A.W. Sijthoff.
- Meulen, Reinder Van der (1909). De Hollandsche zee- en scheepstermen in het Russisch (in Dutch). J. Müller.
- R. van der Meulen, Zwei litauische Totenklagen aus dem Gouvernement Wilna, "Zeitschrift für vergleichende Sprachforschung", 44, 1911, 360-366.
- Meulen R.van der. Peter de Grote en het Hollandsch // Onze Eeuw. 1913. Vol. 13. III. Р. 117-138;
- R. van der Meulen, Garntos prilyginimai lietuvi 14 dainose ir raudose. IS vokieei14 kalbos verte M. B[ iriis]-ka, Vilnius 1919
- "Malefijt : Portugeesch malfeito? [Paperback] Reinder van der Meulen [1939] | Untje". www.untje.com.
- van der Meulen, Reinder (1942). "Poolsch herbata". Mededeelingen der Nederlandsche Akademie van Wetenschappen, Afdeeling Letterkunde. Nieuwe Reeks. 5 (2): 107–112.
- Reinder Van der Meulen: Russisch leesboek met woordenlijst, 1947.
- Meulen, Reinder van der (1958). Over een eigenaardige Litouwse uitdrukking (in Dutch). Noord-Hollandsche Uitg. Mij.
- Meulen, Reinder van der. (1970). Over De Oudpools-litouwse Namen Jagiełło En Radziwiłł. Amsterdam: Noord-Hollandsche U. M..
- Meulen, R.van der: Het lexicon vokabularm novym ро alfavitu (Mededelingen Koninklijke Nederlandse Akademie van Wetenschappen, afdeling Letterkunde. Nieuwe serie. Deel 13. Ne 9). Amsterdam,

=== On Meulen ===
- "Reinder van der Meulen". Visuotinę lietuvių enciklopediją (in Lithuanian).
- Gerschenkron, Alexander (1960). "Reviewed work: Nederlandse Woorden in het Russisch. Supplement op de Hollandsche Zee- en Scheepstermen in het Russisch, R. Van der Meulen". The Journal of Economic History. 20 (1): 149–150. doi:10.1017/S0022050700106618. JSTOR 2115180.
- Kiparsky, V. (1960). "Reviewed work: Nederlandse woorden in het russisch (Supplement op de Hollandsche zee- en scheepstermen in het russisch), R. Van der Meulen; die ungarischen Lehnwörter der bulgarischen Sprache (Ural-altaische Bibliothek VII), Gyula Décsy". Neuphilologische Mitteilungen. 61 (2): 248–252. JSTOR 43342028.
- Kleczkowski, Adam (1950). "Russisch na bekreń, poolsch na bakier. Door R. van der Meulen. Mededeelingen der koninklijke Akademie van Wetenschappen, Afd. Letterkunde, deel 81, serie A, No 3 (str. 69—90), 1936. Recenzie". Język Polski (in Polish). XXX (1): 39–41.
- Круазе ван дер Коп (Croiset van der Kop), Анна (Anna) (1910). "К вопросу о голландских терминах по морскому делу в русском языке: По поводу труда г. Р. Ван-дер-Мэлен: "Голландские морские и судовые термины в русском языке"" [On the problem of Dutch terms for maritime affairs in Russian: Regarding the work of Mr. R. Van der Meulen: "De Hollandsche zee- en scheepstermen in het Russisch" ("Dutch maritime and ship terms in Russian")]. Известия Отделения Русского Языка И Словесности Императорской Академии Наук [Proceedings of the Department of Russian Language and Literature of the Imperial Academy of Sciences] (in Russian). 15 (4): 1–72.
- Louwerse, Nadja (2010-03-01). "Hollandse zee- en scheepstermen in het Russisch: Anna Croiset van der Kop versus Reinder van der Meulen". Studium (in Dutch). 3 (1): 18–30. doi:10.18352/studium.1488. ISSN 2212-7283.
- J. Schaeken, "Hollando-Slavica II: Reinier van der Meulen (1882-1972)", Zjoernal Severjanin 4 I 5, 1994,3-8. Schaeken 1998
