= Herbert Czaja =

German politician (1914–1997)

Herbert Czaja PhD
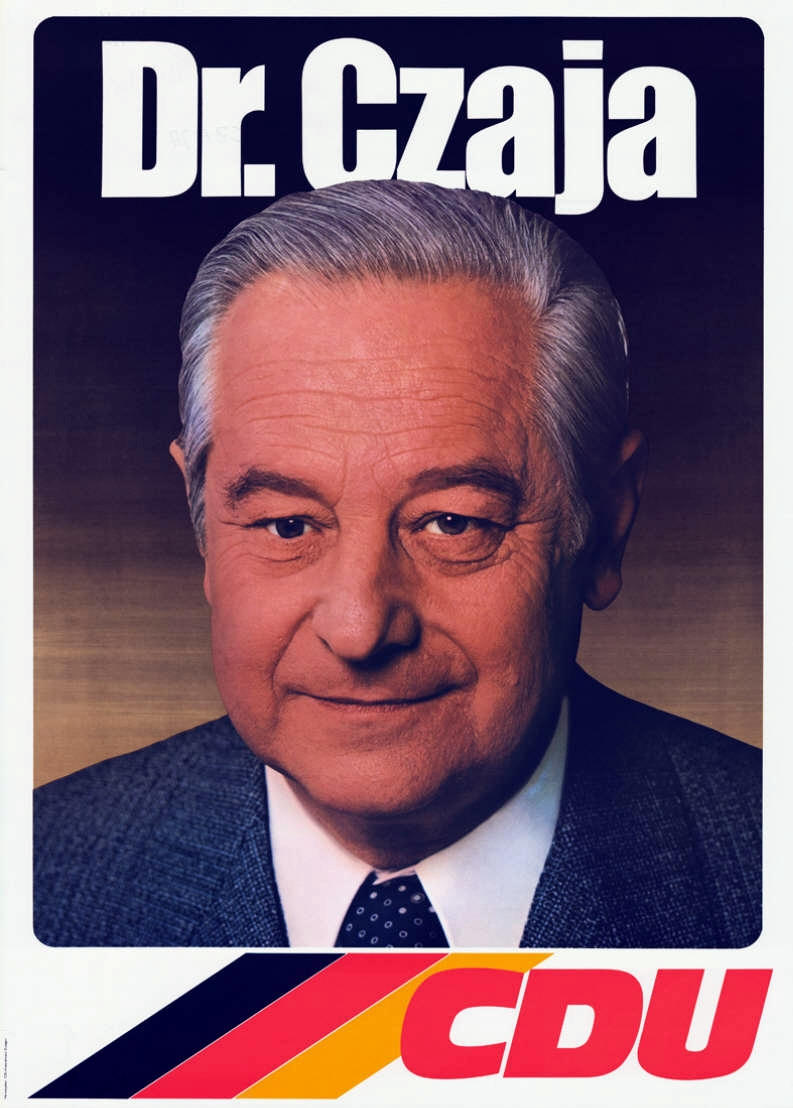
- Czaja CDU electoral poster, 1976

Member of the Bundestag; from Baden-Württemberg
- In office 6 October 1953 – 20 December 1990
- Preceded by: Multi-member district
- Succeeded by: Erika Reinhardt
- Constituency: State list (1953–1983); Stuttgart-Nord (1983–1990)

Personal details
- Born: 5 November 1914 Teschen (Cieszyn), Austria-Hungary (now Poland)
- Died: 18 April 1997 (aged 82) Stuttgart, Germany
- Citizenship: Austria-Hungary; Poland; West Germany; Germany
- Party: Christian Democratic Union
- Other political affiliations: German Christian People's Party
- Education: Jagiellonian University
- Awards: Knight Commander's Cross of the Order of Merit of the Federal Republic of Germany
- Scientific career
- Doctoral advisor: Adam Kleczkowski

Herbert Czaja (5 November 1914 – 18 April 1997) was a German Christian democratic politician. Czaja was born to a multi-ethnic and multilingual family in Cieszyn in Poland, which was part of Austria-Hungary at the time of his birth. During the Second Polish Republic he was politically active in the German Christian People's Party, a centrist party representing German-speaking Catholics in Poland, and obtained a doctorate in philology from the Jagiellonian University. In 1946 he was expelled from his native Poland by the communist regime during the expulsion of Germans after World War II and came as a refugee to Stuttgart in West Germany, where he worked as a teacher and became active in politics for the Christian Democratic Union.

He served as a member of the city council of Stuttgart from 1947 to 1953, as a member of the Bundestag from 1953 to 1990, was a long-time member of the Central Committee of German Catholics from 1948, and was President of the Federation of Expellees from 1970 to 1994. His political activity focused both on the refugees from Eastern Europe and on Catholic affairs. In the official propaganda of the Polish People's Republic, Czaja was portrayed as one of West Germany's most important politicians and his influence often exaggerated. After the Cold War, Czaja was involved in Polish-German reconciliation efforts. He was awarded the Knight Commander's Cross of the Order of Merit of the Federal Republic of Germany in 1984.

== Early life in Austria-Hungary and Poland ==
Herbert Czaja was born in Teschen (Cieszyn) in Austria-Hungary to a bilingual family of Polish, Czech and German origin. Cieszyn was a typically multi-ethnic city where many had both Polish and German (Austrian) roots. His father Albert Czaja was a respected notary who was fluent in Polish, German and Czech; his mother was Louise née Smekal. His father's name Czaja is Polish, while his mother's name Smekal is of Czech origin. Herbert Czaja became a Polish citizen at age four when his hometown became part of the Second Polish Republic. He was fluent in Polish and German.

Czaja studied German studies, history, and philosophy in Vienna and Kraków. Influenced by his bilingual family and upbringing, he became interested in minority issues, and during the 1930s, he was active in German student organisations in the Autonomous Silesian Voivodeship of Poland, as a member of Senator Eduard Pant's German Christian People's Party, a Catholic party working for the interests of the German minority in Poland. In 1937, he joined the German Association for the National Pacification of Europe, an anti-Nazi group in Poland founded by Eduard Pant. At the same time, he worked as a teacher in eastern Upper Silesia. In 1939, before the start of World War II, he received his doctorate in German literature at the Jagiellonian University with the dissertation Stefan Georges Ringen um autonomes Menschentum ("The struggle of Stefan George for autonomous humanity"). His doctoral advisor was Adam Kleczkowski, one of Poland's most respected German studies scholars. He then briefly worked as a scientific assistant at the Jagiellonian University.

During World War II, when his hometown was annexed by Germany, he was considered part of the ethnic German community by the German authorities. From October 1940 to March 1941 Czaja worked as a secondary school teacher in Zakopane and then from March 1941 to May 1942 in Przemyśl. He continued to be involved in anti-Nazi activities, but fearing prosecution for treason and upon the advice of a friend, he volunteered for the Wehrmacht in 1942 to get away from Silesia, serving until he was severely wounded in early 1945.

== Expulsion from Poland ==
When Czaja returned to Cieszyn, his parents' home had been destroyed, communists had taken control over Poland and the situation of ethnic Germans in Silesia was dire. The boundaries between Germans and Poles were blurry in multi-ethnic families like the Czajas, and Czaja appears to initially have been considered Polish upon his return to his hometown. Czaja's mentor and doctoral advisor Adam Kleczkowski offered him a position at the Jagiellonian University to undertake a Habilitation, but Czaja would be required to declare Polish nationality. Under the circumstances of ethnic persecution of the group he felt most attached to and a communist dictatorship now in place in Poland, Czaja was unwilling to declare Polish nationality. Shortly after in 1946, Czaja was expelled by the Polish People's Republic authorities during the expulsion of Germans after World War II.

== Political career in West Germany ==
Herbert Czaja settled in Stuttgart, where he immediately became involved in politics for the Christian Democratic Union and its youth wing, the Junge Union.

He was a member of the city council of Stuttgart from 1947 to 1953. He also co-founded the Union of Expellees in the CDU and chaired the branch in Northern Württemberg. In 1948 he was elected a member of the Central Committee of German Catholics, an office he held for decades. His political career in West Germany focused equally on refugee affairs and on Catholic issues. He was also a central member of the Ackermann Community, a Catholic organisation promoting ties between Germans and Czechs.

He served as a member of the Bundestag, the Parliament of West Germany, from 1953 to 1990. During this time he represented Stuttgart-Nord from 1983 to 1990. He also served as spokesman of the Landsmannschaft der Oberschlesier from 1969 and was president of the Federation of Expellees (Bund der Vertriebenen, BdV) from 1970 to 1994.

In the 1970s and 1980s, Czaja voted, along with several conservative politicians, against the recognition of the Oder-Neisse line as the Polish-German definitive border. Also in 1990, he argued that the reunification of the Federal Republic of Germany with the territory of the former German Democratic Republic was not a complete reunification according to the German constitution of 1949, as it did not include the eastern provinces of Germany as of 1937. Czaja proposed to establish out of Western Poland an autonomous zone under international administration.

During the Cold War, Herbert Czaja figured prominently in the official state propaganda of the communist regime of the People's Republic of Poland, and was often portrayed as an enemy of the state. His influence in West German politics was often exaggerated by the Polish communists.

After the end of the Cold War, he was active in Polish-German reconciliation efforts in the 1990s, and worked as an adviser for the authorities of Opole Voivodeship in modern Poland. While promoting ethnic peace between Poles and Germans, he maintained that the historically eastern German provinces could in the future be reunited with Germany, as he repeated in his 1996 book Unterwegs zum kleinsten Deutschland? Czaja however stated that no expulsions may ever be repeated; that millions of Poles had lived in a German state before and could so once again if these lands would be reintegrated into Germany. Czaja explicitly called for a Centre against Expulsions in Berlin to be established by Germany, Poland and the Czech Republic in a joint effort to promote peace and reconciliation.

== Family ==
Czaja died in Stuttgart in 1997, survived by a wife and ten children. His oldest daughter, Christine Maria Czaja, published a biography of her father in 2003, titled Herbert Czaja: Anwalt für Menschenrechte (Herbert Czaja: Advocate for Human Rights).

== Honours ==
Herbert Czaja was awarded the Officer's Cross of the Order of Merit of the Federal Republic of Germany in 1968. He was awarded the Commander's Cross of the same order in 1973 and the Knight Commander's Cross in 1984. He was awarded the Medal of Merit of Baden-Württemberg in 1988. A street in Stuttgart, Dr.-Herbert–Czaja-Weg, was named in his honour in 2002.

== Literature ==
- Christine Maria Czaja (2003): Herbert Czaja: Anwalt für Menschenrechte. Kulturstiftung der deutschen Vertriebenen
- Waldemar Zylla (ed.), Festschrift zum 70. Geburtstag von Dr. Herbert Czaja am 5. November 1984, Oberschlesischer Heimatverlag, 1984
- Gottfried Zieger, Boris Meissner, Dieter Blumenwitz (eds.), Deutschland als Ganzes: Rechtliche und historische Überlegungen – anläßlich des 70. Geburtstages von Herbert Czaja am 5 November 1984, Verlag Wissenschaft und Politik, 1985
