= German Christian People's Party =

Former political party in Poland

The German Christian People's Party (German: Deutsche Christliche Volkspartei), originally the Catholic People's Party (German: Katholische Volkspartei) and the German Catholic People's Party (German: Deutsche Katholische Volkspartei) was a Christian political party of the German minority in the Second Polish Republic. It had its stronghold in Upper Silesia and was represented in the Silesian Parliament, the Senate of Poland and other legislatives.

It was founded by Thomas Szczeponik in 1922. He served as its chairman until his death in 1927, when he was succeeded by Eduard Pant. Both Szczeponik and Pant were elected as Senators of Poland.

Herbert Czaja, who would later become a West German politician and head of the Federation of Expellees, was a member of the party during the 1930s.

While the party mainly focused on the rights of the German minority in the 1920s, it eventually came to advocate cooperation between Germans and Poles. Eduard Pant and other party members were fierce opponents of the National Socialists in Germany for political and religious reasons.

The party ceased to exist following the German occupation in 1939.
