= Friederike von Reden =

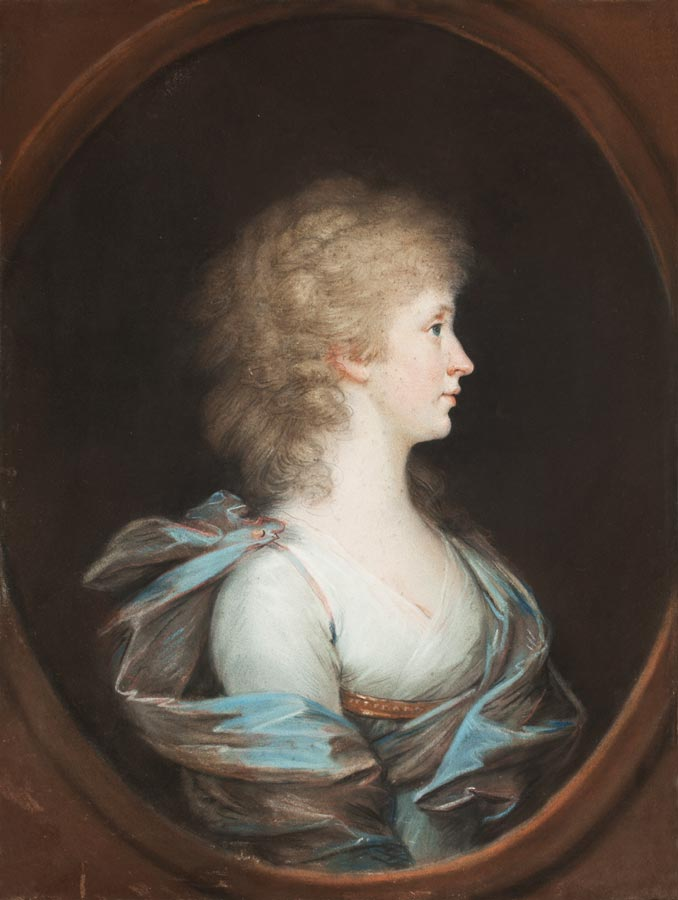
Portrait of Friederike von Reden

Friederike von Reden (1774–1854), was a German noblewoman, philanthropist and salon-holder. She is known as the Mutter des Hirschberger Tales.

== Early life ==
She was born as the daughter of Baron Friedrich Adolf Richard Riedesel zu Eisenbach (1738–1800) and his wife, Friederike Charlotte Louise von Massow (1746–1808).

== Biography ==
She married minister Friedrich Wilhelm von Reden in 1802. After being widowed in 1815, she became a significant philanthropist. She founded the bible society Buchwalder Bibelgesellschaft, whose president she was. She founded a number of charitable societies active in Silesia. She also hosted a literary salon in her home, Schloss Buchwald, which became a center of the Silesian aristocracy.
