= Walther von Holzhausen =

German chess player (1876–1935)

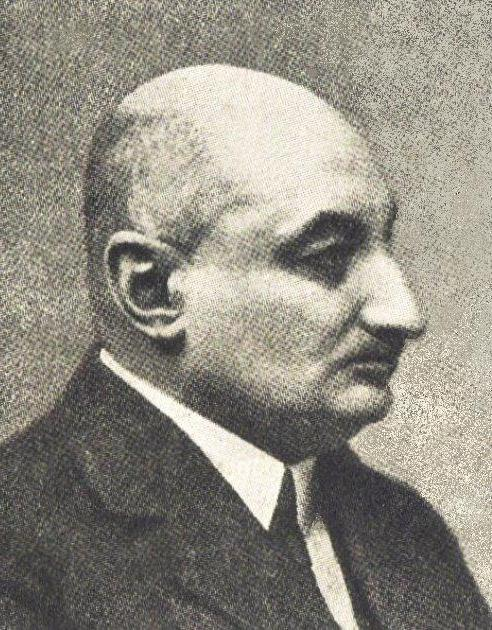
Von Holzhausen

Walther von Holzhausen (29 May 1876, Opava – 9 August 1935, Magdeburg) was a German chess master and problemist.

Born in Troppau (Opava), then Austrian Silesia, as the son of an Austrian officer (although his family lived in Frankfurt am Main), he graduated from states military academies at Graz (Austria) and Hanau (Germany). During World War I, he fought on the Eastern Front, where he was captured by Russians. He was captured as a prisoner of war and was sent to Khabarovsk in Russian Far East. In winter 1917/18 he escaped from the camp.

== Competitions ==
At the beginning of his chess career, he won at Leipzig 1898/99 (Schachklubs Augustea). After the war, he took 4th at Bad Oeynhausen 1922 (the 22nd DSB Congress, Hauptturnier B), took 3rd at Frankfurt 1923 (the 23rd DSB Congress, Haupturnier A), and shared 1st at Eisenach 1924.

Walther von Holzhausen was the director of international the 24th DSB Congress at Breslau 1925 (Efim Bogoljubow won), and won himself Hauptturnier A there. He took 10th place at Berlin 1926, 5th at Dresden 1926, 9th at Vienna 1926 (DSV Kongress), 3rd at Hanover 1926), 8th at Bremen 1927, 3rd-4th at Magdeburg 1927 (the 25th DSB Congress), 8th at Giessen 1928, 12th at Berlin 1928 (Café Koenig), 12th at Duisburg 1929 (the 26th DSB Congress), tied for 13-14th at Bad Pyrmont 1933 (the 1st German Chess Championship) and took 6th at Bad Salzbrunn 1933 (the 12th Silesian Chess Congress).

== Publications ==
He published two chess books: Brennpunktprobleme. Eine Schachstudie. (Leipzig 1926), and Logik und Zweckreinheit im neudeutschen Schachproblem. (Leipzig 1928).

== Namesakes ==
His name is attached to the Holzhausen Attack in the Giuoco Piano (1.e4 e5 2.Nf3 Nc6 3.Bc4 Nf6 4.0-0 Bc5 5.d4 Bxd4 6.Nxd4 Nxd4 7.Bg5 d6 8.f4 Qe7 9.fxe5 dxe5 10.Nc3).
