= Silesian Chess Congress =

German chess tournament (1922–1939)

The Silesian Chess Congress was a German chess tournament held from 1922 until 1939. On 19 September 1877 the Breslau Chess Association (Breslauer Schachverein) was founded by Theodor von Scheve. In 1895 Görlitz and 1899 Liegnitz were meetings of mainly Silesian clubs.

== History ==
After the World War I Germany had to cede a part of the Ostprovinzen, mainly Posen (Poznań). In 1922 the new Silesian Chess Federation (Schlesischer Schachverband) was founded and held congresses until 1939. Members of this federation (Oberschlesischer Schachverband, Groß-Breslauer Schachverband) and of the German Chess Federation in Czechoslovakia (Deutscher Schachverband in der Tschechoslowakei) played in each other's championships.

When the Nazis came to power in 1933, Heinz Josef Foerder, being a Jew, lost his job, and moved to Riga, Latvia. In 1934 he emigrated to British Mandate of Palestine where he had changed his name to Yosef Porat. In April 1935, he tied for 3rd-5th in Tel Aviv (the 2nd Maccabiah Games, Abram Blass won).

== Winners ==
#	Year	City	Winner	Comment
1	1922	Neisse	Hermann Thelen	Thelen won ahead of Kramer
2	1923	Beuthen	Adolf Kramer	Kramer won a play-off against Ertelt
3	1924	Bad Salzbrunn	Walter Bergmann	Bergmann won a play-off against Kramer
4	1925	Breslau	Otto Rüster	played alongside the 24th DSB Congress
5	1926	Altheide Bad	Gottlieb Machate	Friedrich Sämisch (off contest) won
6	1927	Gleiwitz	Ludwig Schmitt	Schmitt got extra-points more than Foerder
7	1928	Reichenbach	Gottlieb Machate	
8	1929	Bad Warmbrunn	Walter Bergmann	Bergmann from Glogau
9	1930	Breslau	Heinz Foerder	Foerder won ahead of Rudolf Pitschak
10	1931	Bad Salzbrunn	Heinz Foerder, Gottlieb Machate	
11	1932	Ratibor	Heinz Foerder	
12	1933	Bad Salzbrunn	Ludwig Schmitt	Schmitt won ahead of Carl Ahues
13	1934	Ottmachau	Ludwig Schmitt	
14	1937	Beuthen	Gottlieb Machate	
15	1938	Liegnitz	Dietrich Duhm	Prof. Duhm from Breslau
16	1939	Bad Warmbrunn	Erich Weinitschke	Weinitschke won a play-off against Heuaecker
