= Otto Rüster =

German chess player

Personal information
- Born: 1895
- Died: ??

Chess career
- Country: Germany; East Germany

Otto Rüster (Ruester, Ruster) (1895–??) was a German chess master.

He represented Germany in 2nd unofficial Chess Olympiad at Budapest 1926. He played several times in Silesian Chess Congress, and won at Breslau 1925 (the 4th SCC). After World War II, he lived in East Germany, and played at Jena 1953 (the 4th GDR-ch).

Before and after the war, he participated in many correspondence chess tournaments.
