= Thomas Szczeponik =

Thomas Szczeponik (born 4 December 1860 in Peiskretscham, Province of Silesia (now Poland), died 30 January 1927 in Katowice (Kattowitz)) was a German-Polish Catholic politician.

He was educated as a teacher at a Catholic seminary in Peiskretscham between 1874 and 1881, and worked as a teacher. He was elected to the Weimar National Assembly in 1919 as a representative of the Catholic Centre Party, and was a member of the German Reichstag until 31 August 1922. In 1920, he voted against the ratification of the Treaty of Versailles. After his hometown became Polish, and he became a Polish citizen, he left the Parliament of Germany in 1922.

After becoming a Polish citizen, he founded the Katholische Volkspartei, a Catholic party that promoted the interests of the German minority in Upper Silesia. He was a Senator of the Republic of Poland and a member of the Silesian Parliament from 1922 until his death. He was also a member of the city council of Katowice. After his death, Arthur Gabrisch succeeded him as Senator and Conrad Kunsdorf as Member of the Silesian Parliament. Eduard Pant was elected new chairman of the party.

A school in Hindenburg in the German part of Silesia was named in his honour from 1929 to 1935. He received the Order of St. Gregory the Great.

== Literature ==
- Gerhard Webersinn, "Thomas Szczeponik. Ein Leben für Glaube, Volkstum und Heimat", in: Jahrbuch der Schlesischen Friedrich-Wilhelms-Universität zu Breslau, Band XVI, Seiten 159 - 214, Göttingen 1971.

Party political offices
Preceded by	Chairman of the Katholische Volkspartei; 1922–1927	Succeeded by Eduard Pant
