= Friedrich Wilhelm von Reden =

German engineer (1752–1815)

Friedrich Wilhelm
- Freiherr von Reden
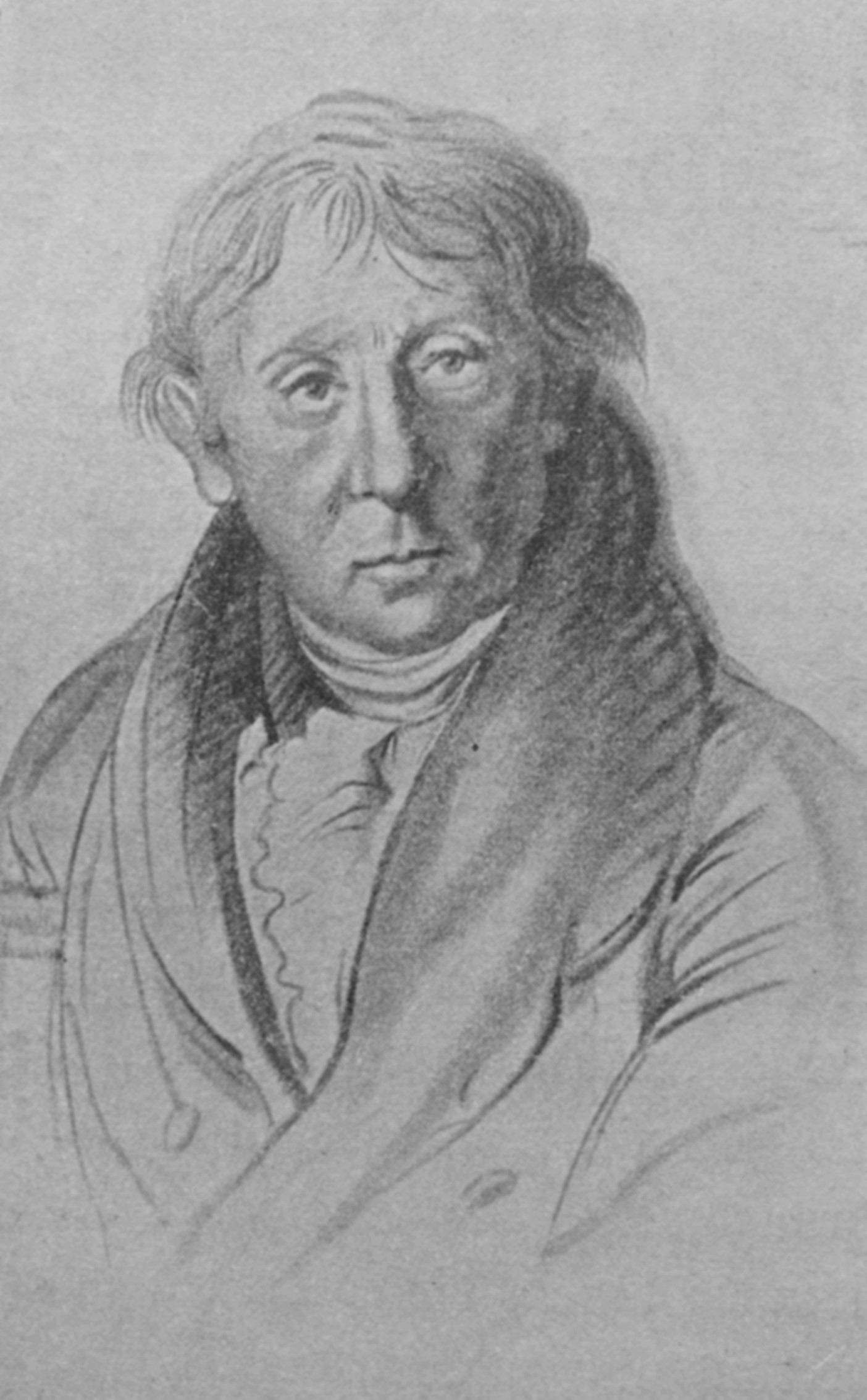
- Friedrich Wilhelm von Reden
- Born: 23 March 1752; Hamelin
- Died: 3 July 1815 (aged 63); Schloss Buchwald

Friedrich Wilhelm von Reden (23 March 1752 – 3 July 1815) was a German pioneer in mining and metallurgy. He was born in Hamelin in the Electorate of Hanover and died in Schloss Buchwald in Prussian Silesia.

== Life ==
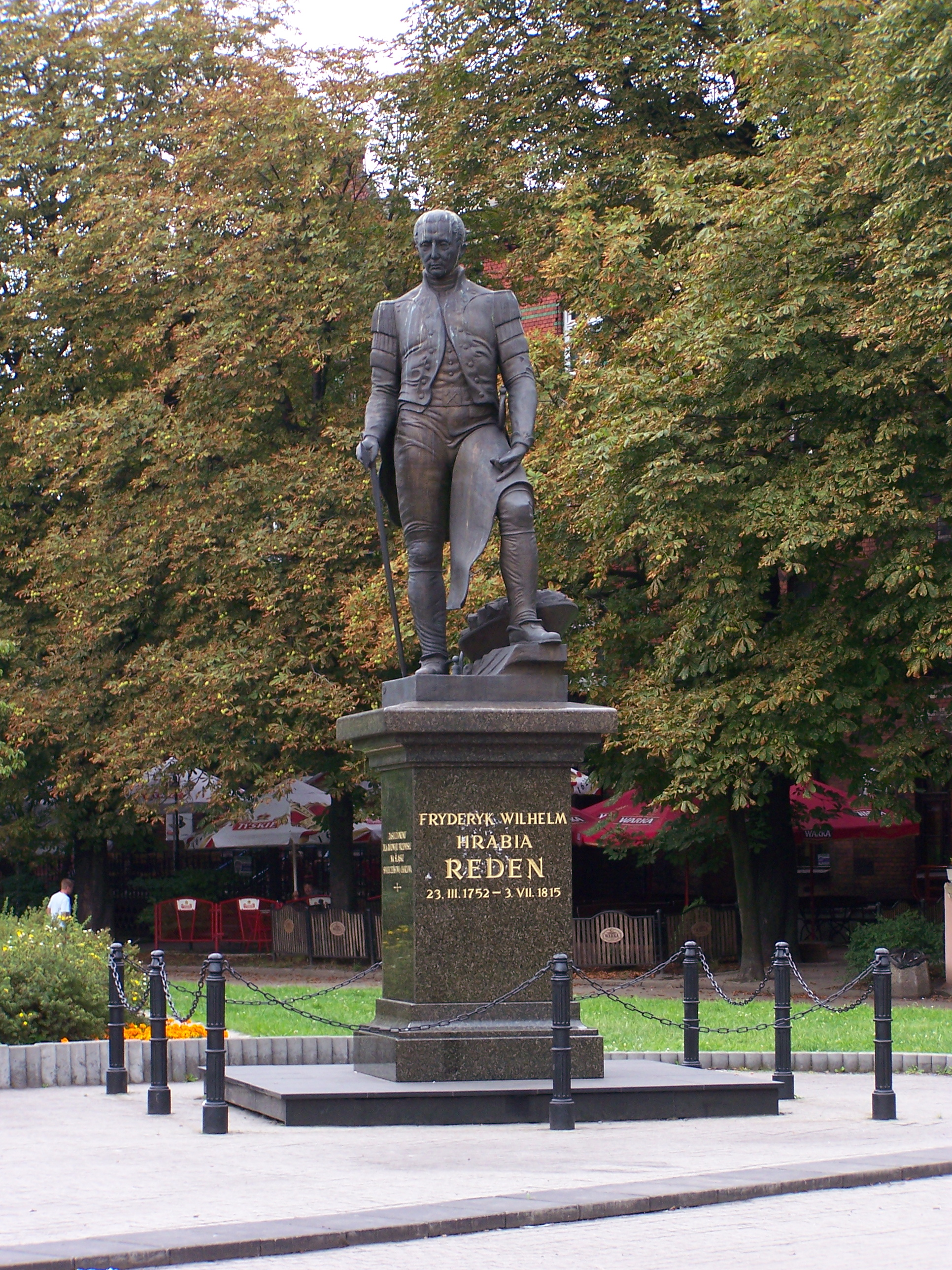
Monument to Friedrich Wilhelm von Reden on Market square, Chorzów.

Reden came from the noble family of Reden, in which mining was a long-standing interest. He was the nephew of the Hanoverian Berghauptmann Claus Friedrich von Reden (.de) (6 April 1736 – 8 October 1791), as well as of Friedrich Anton von Heynitz, a reformer of Prussian mining and metallurgy. One of his cousins was the leading American mountain man Friedrich Otto Burchard von Reden.

In 1768 Reden began an apprenticeship at various mines of the Oberharz. Between 1770 and 1773 he was a student at Göttingen and at Halle. After passing the civil service examination to become an administrative officer, he travelled through Holland, England, and France, visiting mines and metallurgical plants. At the Freiberg University of Mining and Technology, he took a degree in mineralogy and geology under the supervision of Abraham Gottlob Werner. In 1777, he entered the Hanoverian civil service, and was soon appointed by Friedrich Anton von Heynitz to Berlin, in the Department of Mines.

In the late 18th century, Reden played an important role in the development of industry in Silesia. For example, on Reden's initiative, in 1787 one of the first steam-powered pumps in continental Europe was installed in an ore mine at Tarnowitz. Together with John Baildon, Reden was responsible for the introduction of coke into modern steelmaking process in Europe (in Gleiwitz (Gliwice), 1796, and, on a large scale, in Königshütte (Chorzów), 1802).

Reden was knighted by Friedrich Wilhelm II. Following the Napoleonic occupation of Prussia, he remained in office as the Minister of Mines to prevent the plundering of the mines by the French. Because of speeches on 9 November 1806, on the French occupying power, he was sacked from his ministry by Frederick William III, on 9 July 1807.

In the evening of his life, Reden retired to the Hirschberger Tal (Kotlina Jeleniogórska), at the well situated Buchwald (Bukowiec), which he had acquired in 1785. In 1802, he married Friederike Riedesel, Freiin zu Eisenbach, (de:Friederike von Reden) daughter of Friedrich Adolf Riedesel and Frederika Charlotte Riedesel, but the marriage remained childless.

There is a recently (2002 by Augustyn Dyrda) rebuilt monument to Reden in Chorzów (German: Königshütte). The original statue, a bronce cast made by the german sculptor Theodor Kalide, was erected in 1853 on mining ground. This monument has a turbulent history having been demolished and restored several times with the changing political winds in Silesia (1945 definitely pulled down).

On 4 June 1935, the Society of German metalworks and miners donated the Reden medal, on the 25th Anniversary of the Wrocław University of Technology, as an award for excellent dissertations from mining and metallurgical engineers. This award has been given since 1948, by the Society for Mining, Metallurgy, Raw Material and Environmental Technology.

== Literature ==
- Alexander Reden:History of the Reden family", Wagner, Innsbruck 1893 (digital)
- Zbigniew Kapała (eds):Friedrich Wilhelm von Reden i jego czasy. Muzeum w Chorzowie, Chorzów 2002, ISBN 83-913421-7-4 (Friedrich Wilhelm von Reden and his time)
- Władysław Niemierowski:Frederic Reden, 1752-1815. Muzeum Śląskie, Katowice 1988, ISBN 83-85039-25-2
- Slip-Olaf Schmidt (eds):Friedrich Wilhelm Graf von Reden, 1752-1815. Contributions to the early industrialization in Upper Silesia and the Ruhr. LWL Industrial Museum, Dortmund, Essen 2008, ISBN 978-3-89861-931-8
