= Ingeborg Weber-Kellermann =

German folklorist, anthropologist and ethnologist

- Born: 26 June 1918; Berlin, German Empire
- Died: 12 June 1993 (aged 74); Marburg, Germany
- Education: Humboldt University of Berlin
- Occupations: Folklorist; Academic teacher
- Organizations: German Academy of Sciences at Berlin; University of Marburg

Ingeborg Weber-Kellermann (26 June 1918 – 12 June 1993) was a German folklorist, anthropologist and ethnologist. She was an academic teacher, from 1946 at the German Academy of Sciences at Berlin in East Berlin and from 1961 at the University of Marburg.

== Career ==
Born in Berlin, Ingeborg Weber-Kellermann studied ethnology, anthropology and prehistory, among others with Adolf Spamer. She received a doctor's degree at the Humboldt University of Berlin in 1940, on the topic of the ethnography of the German village Josefsdorf (now Josipovac) in Slavonia. It was based on field trips to German settlements in Slavonia. She also studied in Hungary, Banat, Transylvania, and Turkey, focusing on the relation between different ethnic groups.

At the end of World War II, she was a Red Cross nurse in Prague, where she met Jews who had been liberated from the Theresienstadt concentration camp. From 1946 to 1959 she was a scientific assistant and then from 1960 vice director at the Institut für deutsche Volkskunde at the German Academy of Sciences at Berlin in East Berlin, while she lived in West Berlin. When the Berlin Wall was built in 1961, she could no longer commute, and she accepted the offer of the University of Marburg to work at the Institut für mitteleuropäische Volksforschung, later to be called Institut für Europäische Ethnologie/Kulturwissenschaft.

== Works ==
Her 1982 Buch der Weihnachtslieder (Book of Christmas carols) is a collection of 151 German Christmas carols presented in a "cultural-historical context", including background information on lyricists and composers, of the history of each carol, and with period illustrations. Her book Landleben im 19. Jahrhundert (Rural life in the 19th century), published in 1987, renders the reality of the situation of dependent workers on farms and of the work of children, which was different from idyllic bias about life on the country versus life in industrial production.

She died in Marburg on 12 June 1993.

== Selected publications ==
The German National Library holds 35 of her publications, including:

- Josefsdorf: Lebensbild eines deutschen Dorfes in Slawonien (= Deutsche Schriften zur Landes- und Volksforschung. vol. 15). Hirzel, Leipzig 1942, Dissertation, Universität Berlin, 1941, 84 Seiten).
- Erntebrauch in der ländlichen Arbeitswelt des 19. Jahrhunderts. Auf Grund der Mannhardtbefragung in Deutschland von 1865 (= Veröffentlichungen des Instituts für Mitteleuropäische Volksforschung an der Philipps-Universität Marburg-Lahn. Reihe A, Bd. 2). Elwert, Marburg 1965 (Habilitation, Universität Marburg).
- Deutsche Volkskunde zwischen Germanistik und Sozialwissenschaften (= Sammlung Metzler. vol. 79). Metzler, Stuttgart 1969.
- (with Walter Stolle) Volksleben in Hessen 1970. Arbeit, Werktag und Fest in traditioneller und industrieller Gesellschaft. Schwartz, Göttingen 1971, ISBN 3-509-00565-1.
- Die deutsche Familie. Versuch einer Sozialgeschichte (= Suhrkamp-Taschenbuch. vol. 185). Suhrkamp, Frankfurt am Main 1974, ISBN 3-518-06685-4.
- Die Familie. Geschichte, Geschichten und Bilder. Insel, Frankfurt am Main 1976, ISBN 3-458-05020-5.
- Das Weihnachtsfest. Eine Kultur- und Sozialgeschichte der Weihnachtszeit. Bucher, Luzern / Frankfurt am Main 1978, ISBN 3-7658-0273-5.
- Die Kindheit. Kleidung und Wohnen, Arbeit und Spiel. Eine Kulturgeschichte. Frankfurt am Main 1979, ISBN 3-458-05095-7.
- Volksfeste in Deutschland (= HB-Bildatlas spezial. Bd. 3). HB, Hamburg 1981.
- Das Buch der Weihnachtslieder. Mit Klavier- oder Orgelbegleitung. Musical arrangements by Hilger Schallehn. Schott, Mainz 1982, ISBN 3-7957-2061-3. Pocket book (Serie Musik Atlantis-Schott, Band 8213). 12th ed. Atlantis, Mainz 2010, ISBN 978-3-254-08213-8.
- Der Kinder neue Kleider. 200 Jahre deutscher Kindermoden in ihrer sozialen Zeichensetzung (= Suhrkamp-Taschenbuch. vol. 1128). Suhrkamp, Frankfurt am Main 1985, ISBN 3-518-37628-4.
- Saure Wochen, frohe Feste. Fest und Alltag in der Sprache der Bräuche. Bucher, München / Luzern 1985, ISBN 3-7658-0471-1.
- Landleben im 19. Jahrhundert. Beck, München 1987, ISBN 3-406-32177-1.
- Vom Handwerkersohn zum Millionär. Eine Berliner Karriere des 19. Jahrhunderts. Beck, München 1990, ISBN 3-406-34707-X (Biography of Wilhelm Weber).
- Die Kinderstube (= Insel-Bücherei. Band 1126). Insel, Frankfurt am Main 1991, ISBN 3-458-19126-7.
- Die helle und die dunkle Schwelle. Wie Kinder Geburt und Tod erleben (= Beck'sche Reihe. vol. 1035). Beck, München 1994, ISBN 3-406-37425-5.
- Erinnern und vergessen: Autobiographisches und weitere Materialien. ed. Siegfried Becker, Andreas Bimmer. Jonas, Marburg 1993, ISBN 3-89445-240-4.
- Das Buch der Kinderlieder. 235 alte und neue Lieder. Kulturgeschichte, Noten, Texte, Bilder. Klaviersätze von Hilger Schallehn and Manfred Schmitz. Schott, Mainz 1997, ISBN 3-7957-2063-X. Taschenbuch: Melodieausgabe mit Akkordbezifferung (Serie Musik Atlantis-Schott, Band 8370). 2. Auflage. Atlantis, Mainz 2010, ISBN 978-3-254-08370-8.

== Literature ==
- Siegfried Becker, Andreas C. Bimmer (Hrsg.): Ländliche Kultur. Internationales Symposion am Institut für Europäische Ethnologie und Kulturforschung, Marburg, zu Ehren von Ingeborg Weber-Kellermann. Göttingen 1990.
- Annemie Schenk: Interethnische Forschung. In: Rolf W. Brednich (ed.): Grundriss der Volkskunde: Einführung in die Forschungsfelder der europäischen Ethnologie. 3rd ed. Reimer, Berlin 2001, p. 363–390.
- Von der Sprachinselforschung zur Interethnik. In: Ingeborg Weber-Kellermann, Andreas C. Bimmer, Siegfried Becker: Einführung in die Volkskunde/Europäische Ethnologie. Eine Wissenschaftsgeschichte. 3rd ed. Metzler, Stuttgart 2003, p. 175–180.
