= Theodor Kalide =

German sculptor (1801–1863)

Theodor Erdmann Kalide
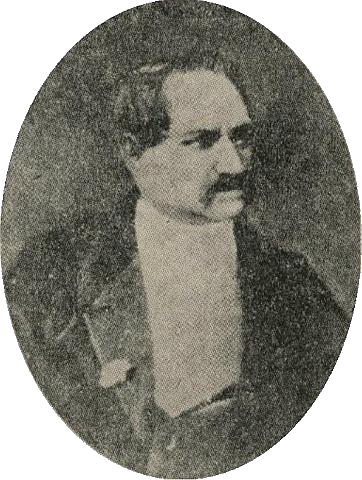
- Born: 8 February 1801; Königshütte, Silesia, Prussia
- Died: 26 August 1863 (aged 62); Gleiwitz, Silesia, Prussia
- Occupation: Sculptor
- Notable work: "Boy with a Swan", "Bacchante on a Panther", "Madonna of Miechowice"

Theodor Erdmann Kalide (8 February 1801 in Königshütte – 26 August 1863 in Gleiwitz) was a German sculptor.

On the recommendation of the mining office (Oberbergamt) Kalide went from Silesia to Berlin around 1818/1819 where he studied at the Royal Prussian Academy of Arts. At about the same time he entered the workshop of the sculptor Johann Gottfried Schadow. Afterward, Kalide was taken over into the sculptor's studio of Christian Daniel Rauch. Under Rauch's direction, he created the "Sleeping Lion", a bronze cast of which reached the grave monument for general Gerhard von Scharnhorst at the Invalids' Cemetery in Berlin, as well as the "Guarding Lion" as a counterpart. The two deer sculptures for Neustrelitz Castle were also created under Rauch's supervision, so that in both cases authorship in research is often granted to Rauch.

Three small, sculptured equestrian figures are known from Kalide's early work, statuettes of Frederick the Great, Frederick William III of Prussia, and the Crown Prince Frederick William IV of Prussia, which enjoyed great popularity and were also purchased by the Prussian Royal House.

Kalides first life-size work completely after their invention, "Boy with a Swan" was first commissioned by Frederick William III of Prussia in bronze for the Charlottenburg Palace garden. This group of figures had great success, was awarded prizes at numerous trade exhibitions and was produced several times in cast iron and zinc; copies of the group were sold worldwide, for example to the Isle of Wight (Park of Osborne House) and to Central Park in New York.

Returning to Berlin from his only trip to Italy in 1846, Kalide performed the group of bacchante on a panther". This first verifiable work in marble by his hand, the execution of which was made possible by Franz von Winckler, is generally regarded as his main work. During the devastation of the National Gallery in World War II, the marble group was severely damaged and is preserved only as a torso. Also, Kalide's monument for Franz von Winckler in Katowice is destroyed.

For Königshütte the sculptor modelled the statue for the memorial of the minister Friedrich Wilhelm von Reden in miner's uniform. The Friedrich Wilhelm von Reden monument with the bronze cast statue was erected in 1853 on the mine site (demolished in 1945). From then on, the sculptor, who worked in Berlin, participated in monument competitions with designs for statues and equestrian statues.

Kalides late work includes the group of a "boy with a goat in battle" (lost) and a second marble statue, the "Madonna of Miechowice" for the "Kreuzkirche", a church in Miechowice near Bytom.

Kalide, who worked in his own sculptor's studio in Berlin (Unter den Linden, corner of Pariser Platz), died in 1863 of a stroke in Gliwice and was buried there at the cemetery. His tomb in Gliwice was reconstructed in 2005.

In Chorzów a street is named after Kalide (the "Kalidestraße" in Gliwice after his brother).

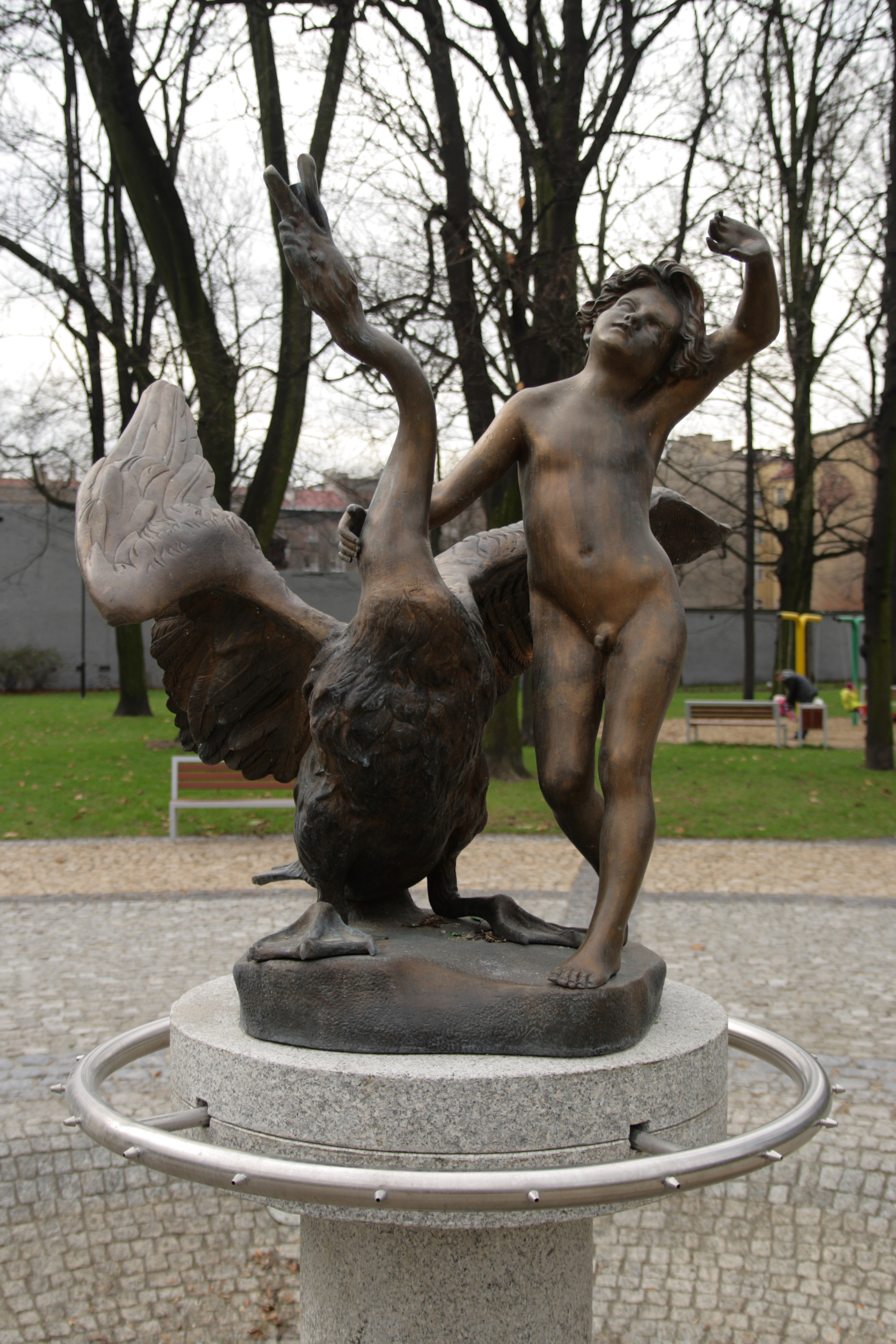
Boy with Swan, Gliwice

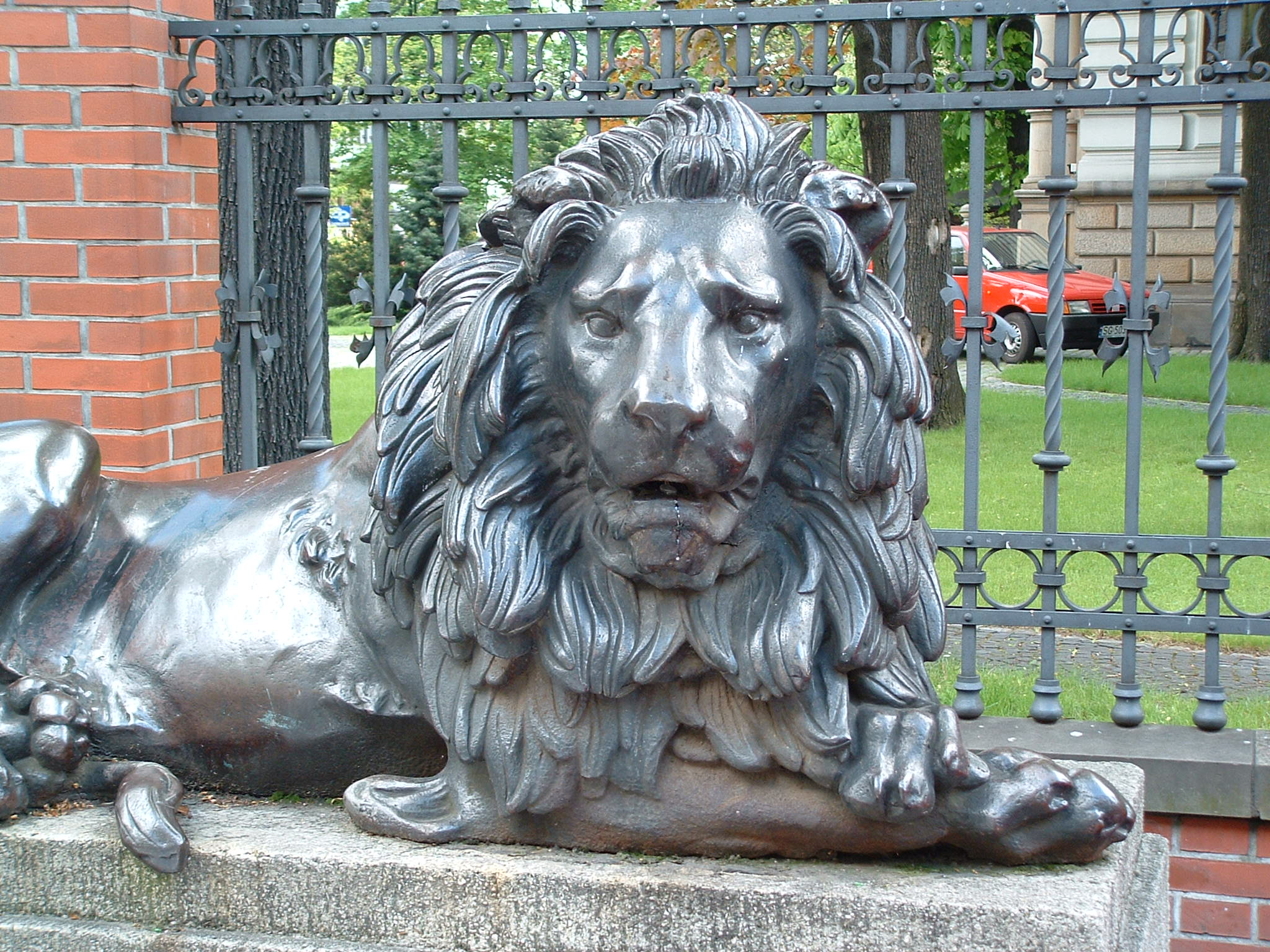
Watchful Lion, Gliwice

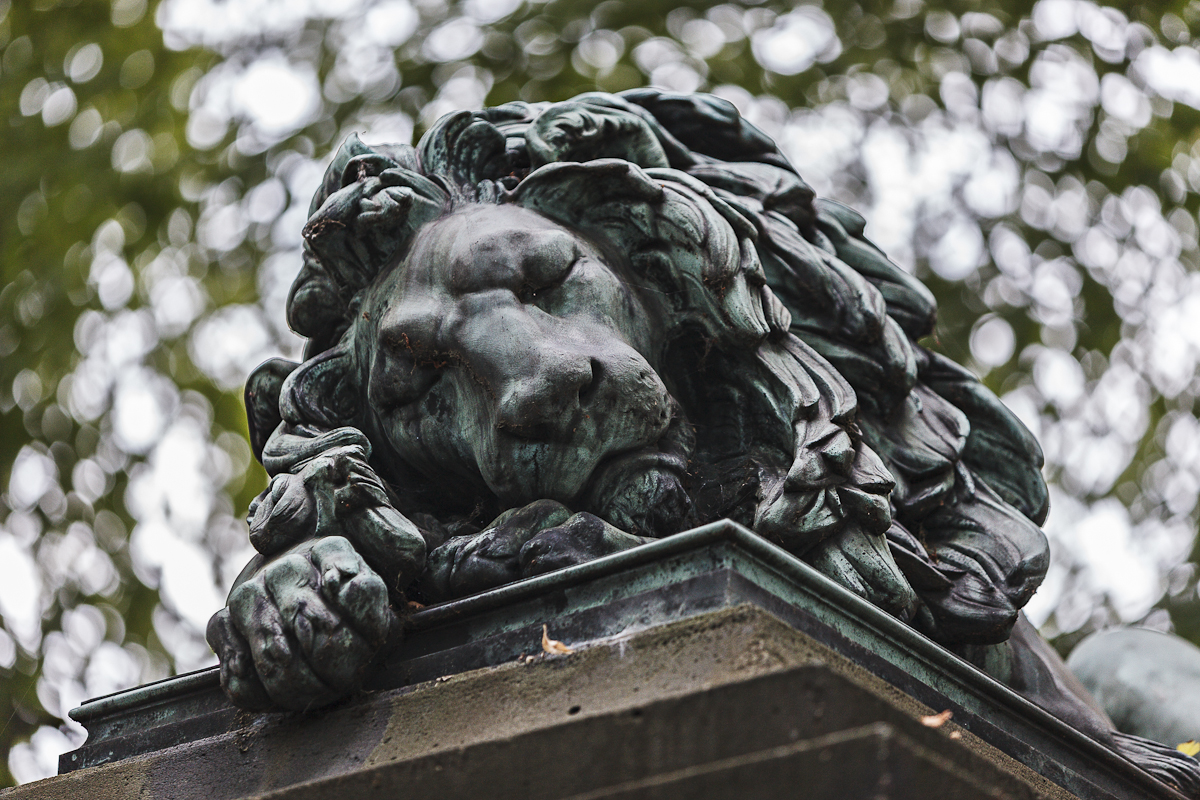
Sleeping Lion, a cemetery in Mainz

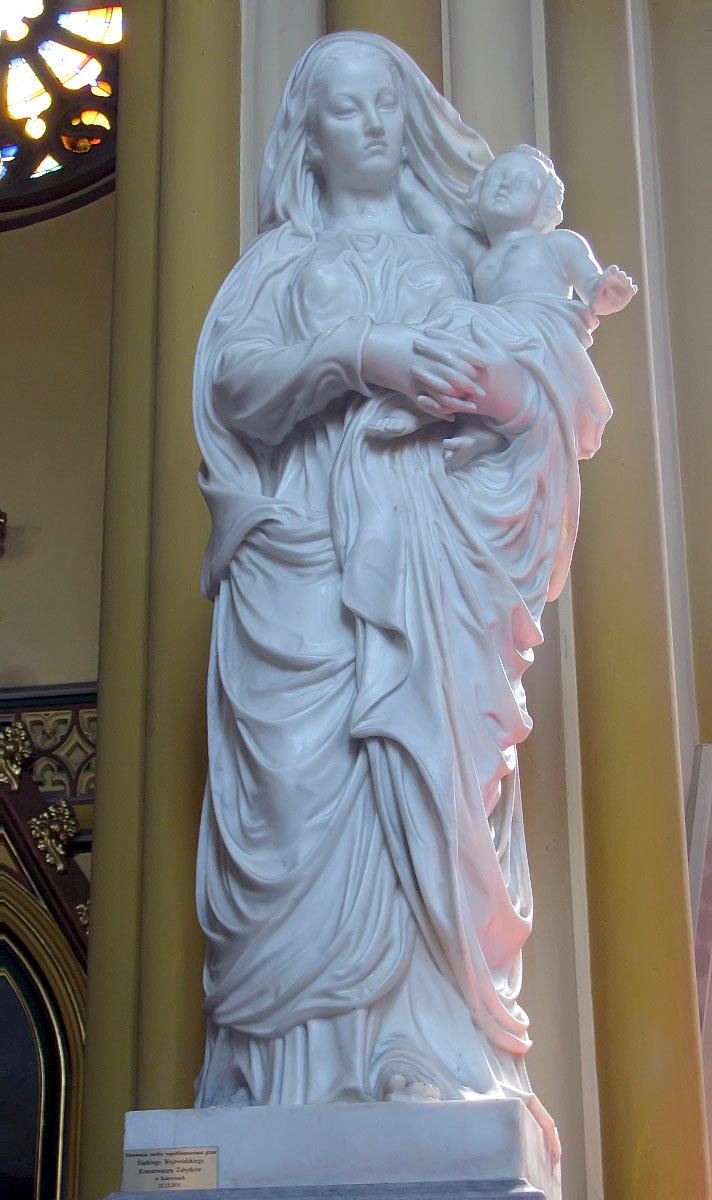
Madonna, Heiligkreuzkirche in Miechowice, Bytom

== References & Sources ==
Justine Nagler: Theodor Kalide. Monographie und Werkverzeichnis des Berliner Bildhauers (1801–1863). Lukas Verlag, Berlin 2018, ISBN 978-3-86732-314-7.
