= Adam Kleczkowski =

Adam Marian Kleczkowski (born 25 March 1883 in Kraków, died 17 November 1949 in Kraków) was a Polish philologist and Professor of Linguistics at the Jagiellonian University. He was a member of the Polish Academy of Learning. He was a specialist in German linguistics.

== Works ==
- Dialekty niemieckie na ziemiach polskich (1915)
- Neuentdeckte Altsaechsische Psalmenfragmente aus der Karolingerzeit (1923-1926, 2 vols.)
- Wyrazy niemieckie w staroczeskim i staropolskim (1927-1928)
- Polski język żeglarski (1928)
- Ein neues Fragment von Willirams Paraphase des Hoches Liedes (1930)
- Wpływ języka polskiego na dialekty prusko-niemieckie (1931)
- Niemiecko-polskie stosunki językowe i literackie (1935)
- Trudności w etymologiach słowiańsko-niemieckich języka Wenedów Lueneburskich (1946)
- Germanistyka, anglistyka i skandynawistyka w Polsce (1948)
- Słowiańskie wpływy językowe w Szlezwigu i Holsztynie (1948)
- Stary marsz berneński (1949)
- Dialekt Wilamowic w zachodniej Galicji. Fonetyka i fleksja.
- Dialekt Wilamowic w zachodniej Galicji. Składnia (szyk wyrazów)
