= Norbert Angermann =

German historian

Norbert Angermann (born 2 November 1936 in Forst (Lausitz)) is a German historian.

Angermann studied Baltic history in Middle Ages, especially the history of Livland, and Russo-German relationships during the same period. His teacher was Paul Johansen. He was Professor of Eastern European History in University of Hamburg and has been Emeritus since 2002. Norbert Angermann served as an editor for several books, so aside of Robert Auty (volume 1) and Robert-Henri Bautier (volumes 2 bis 5) for the volumes 6 to 9 of the Lexikon des Mittelalters. He lives in Buchholz in der Nordheide.

== Literature ==
=== Author ===
- Die Deutschen in Litauen. Ein geschichtlicher Überblick. Nordostdeutsches Kulturwerk, Lüneburg 1996, ISBN 3-922296-98-X.
- Die baltischen Länder. Ein historischer Überblick. Nordostdeutsches Kulturwerk, Lüneburg 1990.
- Hermann Kellenbenz (Hrsg.) unter Mitarbeit von Norbert Angermann: Europäische Wirtschafts- und Sozialgeschichte vom ausgehenden Mittelalter bis zur Mitte des 17. Jahrhunderts. Klett-Cotta, Stuttgart 1986, ISBN 3-12-904750-6.
- Studien zur Livlandpolitik Ivan Groznyjs. Dissertation. Herder-Institut, Marburg (Lahn) 1972, ISBN 3-87969-098-7.

=== Editor ===
- Robert Auty, Robert-Henri Bautier, Norbert Angermann (Hrsg.): Lexikon des Mittelalters. Metzler, Stuttgart und Weimar, ISBN 3-476-01742-7
- with Michael Garleff and Wilhelm Lenz: Ostseeprovinzen, baltische Staaten und das Nationale. Festschrift für Gert von Pistohlkors zum 70. Geburtstag, Schriften der Baltischen Historischen Kommission Band 14; LIT Verlag, Münster 2005 ISBN 3-8258-9086-4
  - in it: Norbert Angermann: Carl Schirrens Vorlesungen über die Geschichte Livlands, Seiten 213 - 226
- Norbert Angermann and Klaus Friedland (Hrsg.): Novgorod. Markt und Kontor der Hanse. Böhlau, Köln u.a. 2002, ISBN 3-412-13701-4.
- Norbert Angermann and Paul Kaegbein (Hrsg.): Fernhandel und Handelspolitik der baltischen Städte in der Hansezeit. Nordostdeutsches Kulturwerk, Lüneburg 2001, ISBN 3-932267-19-2.
- Norbert Angermann and Ilgvars Misāns (Hrsg.): Wolter von Plettenberg und das mittelalterliche Livland. Nordostdeutsches Kulturwerk, Lüneburg 2001, ISBN 3-922296-89-0
- as editor: Deutschland - Livland - Russland. Ihre Beziehungen vom 15. bis zum 17. Jahrhundert. (= Beiträge aus dem Historischen Seminar der Universität Hamburg), Verlag Nordostdeutsches Kulturwerk, Lüneburg 1988 ISBN 3-922296-35-1
