= Gottlieb Machate =

German chess player

- Born: 20 November 1904; Breslau
- Died: 27 May 1974 (aged 69); Stuttgart

Gottlieb Machate (20 November 1904, in Breslau – 27 May 1974, in Stuttgart) was a German chess master.

He participated several times in Silesian Chess Congresses. In 1926 roku he took 2nd, behind Fritz Sämisch (off contest), in Altheide Bad (Polanica-Zdrój), and won the Silesian Champion title. He shared 3rd at Gleiwitz (Gliwice) 1927, won at Reichenbach (Dzierżoniów) 1928, took 4th at Breslau (Wrocław) 1930 (Heinz Foerder won), shared 1st with Foerder at Bad Salzbrunn (Szczawno-Zdrój) 1931, took 7th at Bad Salzbrunn (Szczawno-Zdrój) 1933 (Ludwig Schmitt won), and again won at Beuthen (Bytom) 1937.

He played for Germany at first board in 2nd unofficial Chess Olympiad at Budapest 1926, tied for 9–11th at Magdeburg 1927 (DSB Congress, Rudolf Spielmann won), tied for 5–6th at Swinemünde (Świnoujście) 1933, and took 10th at Bad Elster 1936.

After World War II, he took 12th at Stuttgart 1947 (Ludwig Rellstab won), took 6th at Riedenburg 1947, tied for 8–10th at Kirchheim unter Teck 1947, and played in West Germany champions. He took 3rd at Weidenau 1947 (Georg Kieninger won), took 3rd at Essen 1948 (Wolfgang Unzicker won), tied for 5–9th at Bad Pyrmont 1949 (Efim Bogoljubow won), tied for 11–12th at Bad Pyrmont 1950 (Unzicker won).
