= Erich Weinitschke =

German chess player

Erich Weinitschke, born 10 March 1910, was a German chess master.

Weinitschke was born in Dzierżoniów in Silesia in March 1910, 1910. He took 10th at Bad Elster 1938 (Efim Bogoljubow won), took 4th at Bad Warmbrunn (now Cieplice Śląskie–Zdrój) 1939 and won a play-off match against Heuaecker for the Silesian Champion title (Silesian Chess Congress), tied for 13-14th at Bad Oeynhausen 1941 (the 8th GER-ch, Paul Felix Schmidt and Klaus Junge won).
