= Eduard Pant =

German politician (1887–1938)

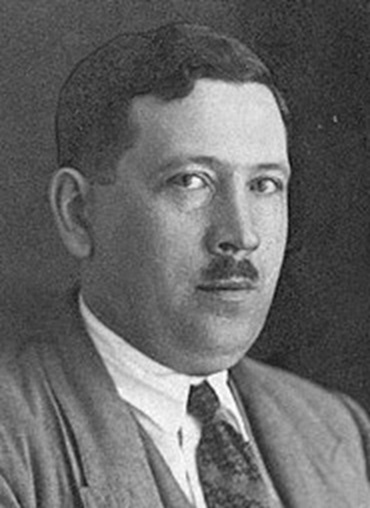
Eduard Pant in the 1920s

Eduard Pant (29 January 1887 – 20 October 1938) was a journalist and politician of the Catholic German minority in the Silesian Voivodeship of Poland in the interwar period. He was Deputy Speaker of the Silesian Parliament from 1922 to 1935 and a Senator of the Second Polish Republic from 1928 to 1935.

Eduard Pant came from a working-class Catholic family, but went on to study Classical philology, German and Philosophy at the University of Prague, where he earned a doctorate in 1911. He worked as a teacher in German-language schools in Austria (Prague, Linz and Vienna). In 1914, he returned to Silesia, where he worked at a school in Bielitz before he was conscripted into the Austro-Hungarian Army during the First World War. After the area became part of Poland, he became a Polish citizen in 1920. He was the editor of the German-language newspaper Oberschlesischer Kurier from 1926 to 1930. He was elected President of the Deutsche Katholische Volkspartei in 1927, succeeding the deceased Thomas Szczeponik, and was also President of the Association of German Catholics in Poland.

During the 1930s, Pant was an outspoken opponent of the National Socialists and a proponent of cooperation between Germans and Poles. He also founded the conservative Catholic and outspokenly anti-Nazi newspaper Der Deutsche in Polen (1934–1939).

Herbert Czaja, who later became a politician in West Germany and President of the Federation of Expellees, was a member of Pant's party in the 1930s.

== Literature ==
- Pia Nordblohm (2001). "Pant, Eduard". Neue Deutsche Biographie (in German). Vol. 20. Berlin: Duncker & Humblot. pp. 39–40.
- Pia Nordblom: Eduard Pant (1887-1938), in: Schlesische Lebensbilder, 9th volume, ed. by Joachim Bahlcke, Insingen 2007, p. 361-372.
- Pia Nordblom: Mniejszość w mniejszości – Eduard Pant i jego koło. Studia Śląskie, Tom LXII (2003), p. 227–254.
- Pia Nordblom: Für Glaube und Volkstum. Die katholische Wochenzeitung „Der Deutsche in Polen“ (1934–1939) in der Auseinandersetzung mit dem Nationalsozialismus. Paderborn, München, Wien 2000 (Published by the Kommission für Zeitgeschichte: serial B, Forschungen; vol. 87)
- Pia Nordblom: Dr. Eduard Pant. Biographie eines katholischen Minderheitenpolitikers in der Woiwodschaft Schlesien (bis zum Jahr 1932). In: Oberschlesisches Jahrbuch, Heidelberg, 3 (1987), p. 112–146 [Cf. hierzu Redaktionelle Bemerkung (= editorial remark) (Addentum to vol. 3), in: Oberschlesisches Jahrbuch 4 (1988), p. 222].
