= Johann Christian Ruberg =

Johann Christian Ruberg (baptized 4 September 1746 – 5 September 1807) was a German inventor and a pioneer in metallurgy.

About 1798, Ruberg devised the first large-scale method for the production of zinc. This method (so-called "Silesian method"), used horizontal muffle furnaces which permitted for continuous operation, i.e., loading the input and unloading the product without cooling. This greatly improved the energy economy and labour intensity of the process. It subsequently led to the development of large zinc manufacturing industry in Silesia. Ruberg also authored several inventions and optimizations in glass-making.

Ruberg is buried at the Lutheran parish church cemetery in Lędziny, where a memorial to him was installed in 1998. In 2000, an elementary school at Lędziny (Szkola Podstawowa No 3) received his name.
