= Ludwig Schmitt (chess player) =

Ludwig Schmitt (15 April 1902 – 1980) was a German chess master.

Schmitt was born in Augsburg (Bavaria) and later lived in Breslau, Prussian Silesia. He won the Silesian Chess Congress in 1927, 1933 and 1934, took 6th in 1930 (Heinz Foerder won), and 5th place in 1939 (Erich Weinitschke won) in these events. He was a Champion of Sachsen in 1929, 1932, 1933, and of Bayern in 1953.

He took 13th at Magdeburg 1927 (DSB Congress, Rudolf Spielmann won), tied for 8-10th at Brno 1931 (Salo Flohr won), took 18th at Bad Aachen 1934 (2nd German Chess Championship, Carl Carls won), tied for 5-7th at Bad Oeynhausen 1937 (4th GER-ch, Georg Kieninger won), tied for 12-14th at Bad Oeynhausen 1938 (5th GER-ch, Erich Eliskases won),

After World War II, he took 16th at Augsburg 1946 (Wolfgang Unzicker won), shared 1st with Unzicker at Leipzig 1953 (15th GER-ch) and lost a play-off match for the title to him (0.5 : 3.5) in January 1954.
