= Yosef Porat =

German-Israeli chess player

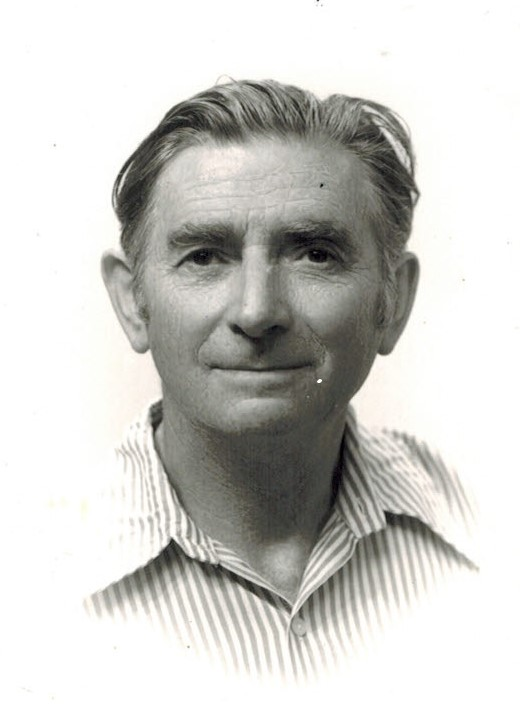

Personal information
- Native name: יוסף פורת
- Born: Heinz Josef Foerder; 7 June 1909 Breslau, Silesia, Germany
- Died: 18 May 1996 (aged 86) Ramot HaShavim, Israel

Chess career
- Country: Germany; Israel

Yosef Porat (Hebrew: יוסף פורת; 7 June 1909, Breslau, Germany – 18 May 1996, Ramot HaShavim, Israel) was a German-Israeli chess player.

== Biography ==
Yosef Porat was born Heinz Josef Foerder in Germany. He took the name Yosef Porat in Israel. In 1933, he lost his job after the Nazis assumed power in Germany, and moved to Riga. In 1934 he emigrated to Palestine. In April 1935, he tied for 3rd-5th in Tel Aviv (the 2nd Maccabiah Games, Abram Blass won).

== Chess career ==
Yosef Porath competed in the Chess Olympiads twelve times. In 1928, Foerder was a member of the German team at the 2nd Olympiad in The Hague. He played several times in Silesian Chess Congress: shared 1st with Ludwig Schmitt at Gleiwitz 1927; took 2nd, behind Gottlieb Machate, at Reichenbach 1928; and won at Breslau 1930, shared 1st at Bad Salzbrunn 1931, and again won at Ratibor 1932. He also won, ahead of Salo Flohr, at Bilina 1930, and took 2nd, behind Gottlieb Machate, at Breslau 1933.

Porath represented the Palestine team at first board in the 6th Olympiad at Warsaw 1935, and at second board in the 8th Olympiad at Buenos Aires 1939. After World War II, Porath played for the Israeli team in nine consecutive Olympiads from 1952 through 1968. He won the Palestine Championship in 1937 and 1940 (after a play-off), and the Israeli Championship in 1953, 1957, 1959, and 1963. In 1963, he won in Ulaanbaatar (zonal tournament). In 1964, he took 21st in Amsterdam (interzonal).

Porat was awarded, along with Moshe Czerniak, the International Master (IM) title in 1952.
