= Silesian Separatist Movement =

Silesian Separatist Movement Śląski Ruch Separatystyczny
- Abbreviation: ŚRS
- Leader: Dariusz Jerczyński
- Founded: 19 March 2007
- Dissolved: 9 June 2010
- Preceded by: Federation for Silesian Development
- Headquarters: Moniuszki 12/8, 40-005 Katowice
- Membership: ~20
- Ideology: Silesian independence Silesian regionalism Linguistic separatism Direct democracy Social democracy
- Political position: Centre-left
- National affiliation: People of the Silesian Nation
- Regional affiliation: Silesian Autonomy Movement
- Colours: Yellow
- Slogan: "Long live independent Silesia!"
- Silesian Regional Assembly: 0 / 45
- Opole Regional Assembly: 0 / 30

Party flag
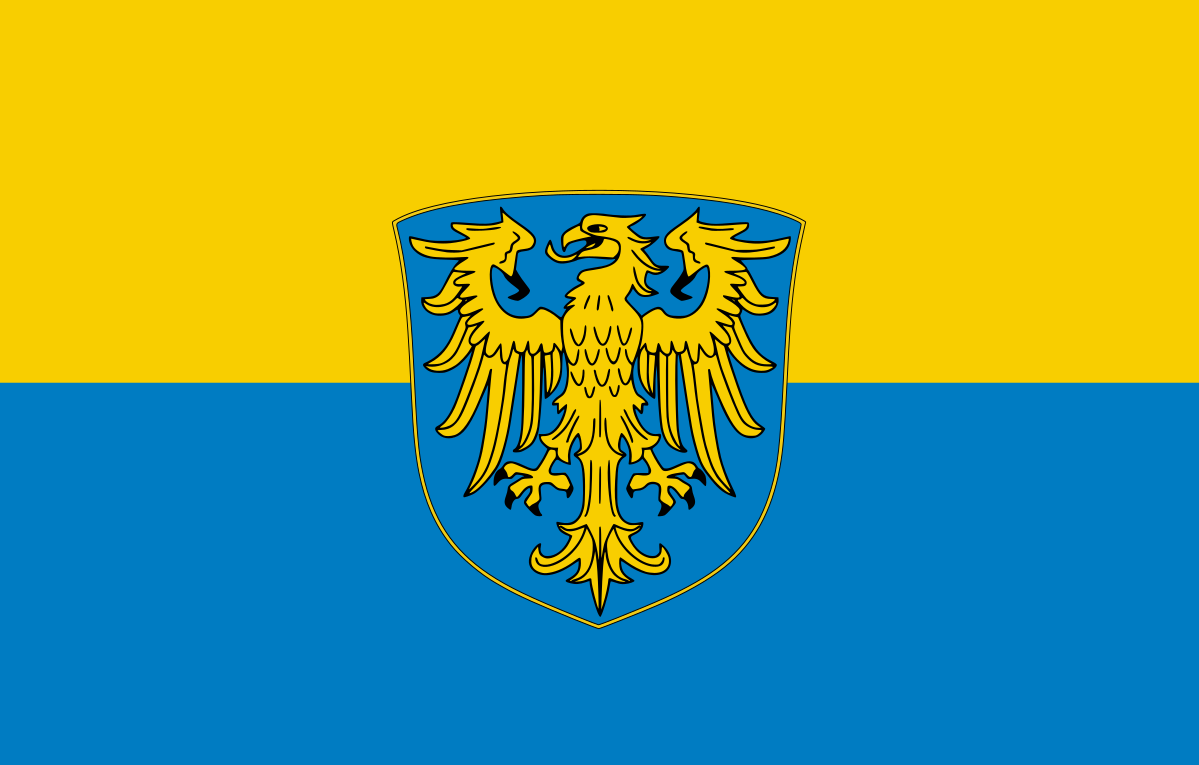

The Silesian Separatist Movement (Polish: Śląski Ruch Separatystyczny, ŚRS) was a minor Silesian party that advocated for Silesian independence from Poland. The party was founded on 19 March 2007 by Silesian activists Dariusz Jerczyński, Grzegorz Kot and Marcela Tampa. The party was affiliated with a Silesian regionalist organisation People of the Silesian Nation and the Silesian Autonomy Movement, and Grzegorz Kot ran for the Senate of Poland in the 2007 Polish parliamentary election on behalf of this party. Silesian Separatist Movement listed "national and territorial separation of Silesia from Poland" and "the sanctioning of Silesian nationality" as its main goals. According to its program, the party was dedicated to the concept of an independent Silesian state in tradition of interwar Silesian movements such as Silesian People's Party (1908–1938) and the Union of Upper Silesians (1919–1924), which wanted to realise this concept. In May 2010, the movement was put into liquidation, and was removed from the Register of Associations on June 6.

The party has declared its goals to be the national and territorial separation of Silesia and the recognition of the Silesian nationality, and believed that the Polish government ignores the interests of Silesian people. The Silesian Separatist Movement was largely inspired by the autonomist politician Józef Kożdoń, consider the party's "patron", and declared the continuation of his legacy, including the social-democratic values of his movement. The party participated in the 2007 Polish parliamentary election and the 2010 Polish local elections, where the member of the party Grzegorz Kot ran on behalf of People of the Silesian Nation and the Silesian Autonomy Movement. The movement supported other independence movements such as the Catalan independence movement, and petitioned Polish government to legally recognise Silesian as a regional language in 2012.

== History ==
The Silesian Separatist Movement was registered as a political association on 19 March 2007, with Grzegorz Kot, Dariusz Jerczyński and Marcela Tampa listed as the leadership of the party. The Movement was closely associated with Związek Ludności Narodowości Śląskiej (People of the Silesian Nation) and was to be a branch of the organisation. The Party was initially registered as Federacja Rozwoju Śląska (Federation for Silesian Development), but was renamed to Silesian Separatist Movement and became a part of People of the Silesian Nation. The party also cooperated electorally with the much larger Silesian Autonomy Movement. One of the party's founders, Grzegorz Kot, stated: "We knew we would have trouble registering as separatists, so we registered first under a different name".

Dariusz Jerczyński is a Silesian historian, publicist and a supporter of Silesian independence, who worked as an editor for the newspaper of the Silesian Autonomy Movement called Jaskółka Śląska. In autumn 2007, Dariusz Jerczyński made contact with the leaders of the Federation for the Development of Silesia - Grzegorz Kot and Marceli Potempa, to create a new Silesian National Movement on the basis of their former organisation. Because the local district court objected to this name, the organisation was finally registered under the name Silesian Separatist Movement, and Jerczyński became its general secretary.

The founders of the Silesian Separatist Movement participated in the march for Silesian autonomy in Warsaw, where they were photographed with prominent Silesian activists such as Kazimierz Kutz and Jerzy Gorzelik. In 2007, Grzegorz Kot participated in the Polish parliamentary election, where he ran for a seat in the Senate of Poland on behalf of the People of the Silesian Nation; he obtained 385 votes. Kot also participated in the 2010 Polish local elections, running for the Katowice city council as a candidate of the Silesian Autonomy Movement; he won 51 votes.

In 2010, a right-wing local Katowice politician Witold Naturski wrote an article "Silesian separatists dream of seats and power" for a Silesian newspaper Dziennik Zachodni. Naturski referred to the Silesian Autonomy Movement as separatist and denounced its proposals to federalize Poland as a scheme to fracture the Polish state. Naturski claimed that Silesian regionalists take advantage of the ignorance of less-educated and poor voters, and that the ultimate goal of Silesian autonomists is to join Germany.

The Silesian Separatist Party wrote a response to Naturski's article, explaining that the Silesian Autonomy Movement is not a Silesian party and stating that "any Silesian who holds separatist views has every right to join the legally operating association Silesian Separatist Movement instead". The party stated that while the Silesian Autonomy Movement strives to restore the interwar Silesian autonomy under the Second Polish Republic, the ŚRS takes Józef Kożdoń as its official patron and refers to the concept of an independent Silesian state as envisioned by Silesian regionalists after the First World War, and in its statute refers to the tradition of the Silesian People's Party and the Union of Upper Silesians, which wanted to put this concept into practice. The party also stated that any pro-German sentiments amongst Silesians can be solved by restoring Silesian autonomy, as the main appeal of joining Germany is that Silesia would enjoy autonomy as a part of Germany. However, the ŚRS does not support this view as Germany failed to grant autonomy to Frisia and Lusatia. The party also argued that autonomy would not fracture Poland, arguing that Basque autonomy deradicalised the Basque national movement.

In 2018, the Silesian Separatist Movement was attacked by a Polish local right-wing politician Piotr Spyra, who founded an association called Koalicja Polski Śląsk meant to federate minor anti-separatist and Polish nationalist groups in Silesia. Spyra argued that the existence of the party is illegal, and accused it of anti-Polish sentiment.

== Ideology ==
The party declared "national and territorial separation of Silesia from Poland" as its main goal, along with "the sanctioning of Silesian nationality". The Silesian Separatist Movement wished to continue "the legacy and achievements of the eminent Silesian, Józef Kożdoń, as well as Silesian organisations since 1909". The party was largely inspired and based on the views of interwar parties Silesian People's Party (1908–1938) and the Union of Upper Silesians (1919–1924), as well as the writings of Kożdoń, who in 1910 wrote: "We do not know Polish patriotism, we do not know the Polish homeland. Silesia does not long for mother Poland". Dariusz Jerczyński stated that the party is "deutschfreundlich", which he defined as taking "a similar view of Silesian history, culture, geography, linguistic relations, mentality to Germanness, rather than seeking German statehood". Jerczyński clarified that while Bavaria never denied its "Germaness", it did strongly oppose being annexed into the German Empire in 1871, and that Switzerland never wanted to join Germany despite most of Swiss population belonging to the "German cultural sphere".

Despite its separatist character, the party also supported moderate proposals of Silesian Autonomy Movement, such as restoring the financial autonomy of the Silesia and the promotion of Upper Silesian culture. One of the founders of the Silesian Separatist Movement, Grzegorz Kot, explained: "Our aim is national separatism. It is not about building new borders, but about recognising Silesian nationality". The Silesian Separatist Movement expressed its support for other independence movements, and published a statement together with the People of the Silesian Nation where it endorsed Catalan independence and accused the European Union of denying the right to self-determination of Catalonia and ignoring the abuses of the Spanish government.

In regards to national Polish politics, the party leaned towards the political left - the Silesian Separatist Movement was strongly critical of the conservative Law and Justice party, and supported the idea of a coalition between Civic Platform and the Silesian Autonomy Movement. The party also claims to be strongly inspired by and following the legacy of Józef Kożdoń, who co-founded the Silesian Social Democratic Party. The movement supported the 2015 Polish referendum and stated its belief that Silesia should adopt a system of direct democracy similar to that of Switzerland.

According to the Silesian Separatist Movement, the Silesian people form a nation separate from Poland. The leader of the party, Dariusz Jerzyński, published a controversial book "History of the Silesian people" which argued that Silesia is culturally separate from Poland and had undergone different socioeconomic, political and historical developments. The party also protested the 2007 proposal of Polish government to change the name of KL Auschwitz from "concentration camp" to "former German Nazi camp", arguing that the name should "reflect both their period of functioning as Nazi camps and as Soviet and Polish concentration camps, functioning in the same places between 1945 and 1948 and intended for prisoners of war and civilians: Silesians, Germans, Ukrainians and the Volksdeutsche".

On 17 May 2012, the party was one of the organisers of a written a request to Prime Minister Donald Tusk to legally recognise the Silesian language as a regional language and to recognise Silesians as an ethnic minority in Poland, in the Act on National and Ethnic Minorities. National and Ethnic Minorities and the Regional Language, as per the Polish act of 6 January 2005 on national and ethnic minorities and on the regional language.

One of the main demands of the party was to recognise Silesian language as a language rather than a dialect or an ethnolect of Polish. The movement emphasises not only the historical separateness of Silesia from Poland, but also the linguistic distinctiveness of Silesian. Dariusz Jerczyński wrote: "The Silesian language is a fully-fledged Slavic language [...] and not a creole language or a dialect of the Polish language. People who speak it and do not feel Polish, Czech, Moravian, Slovak, German or Austrian are of Silesian nationality and not, as Poles claim, deprived of a sense of national identity or feeling a regional identity."

== See also ==
- Silesian Regional Party
- Silesian Autonomy Movement
- Union of Upper Silesians
- Silesian People's Party
- German Minority (political party)
- Silesians Together
