= Silesian Autonomy Movement =

Silesian Autonomy Movement Ruch Autonomii Śląska Ruch Autōnōmije Ślōnska
- Abbreviation: RAŚ
- Leader: Jerzy Gorzelik
- Founded: January 1990 (organisation); 27 June 2001 (voluntary association)
- Headquarters: Plac Wolności 7, 44-200 Rybnik
- Membership (2010): ~7,000
- Ideology: Economic progressivism Silesian autonomism Silesian regionalism Left-wing populism
- Political position: Left-wing
- National affiliation: Civic Coalition (2019)
- Regional affiliation: Silesian Regional Party
- European affiliation: European Free Alliance
- International affiliation: European Free Alliance
- Colours: Cerulean Blue; Gold
- Silesian Regional Assembly: 0 / 45
- Opole Regional Assembly: 0 / 30

Party flag
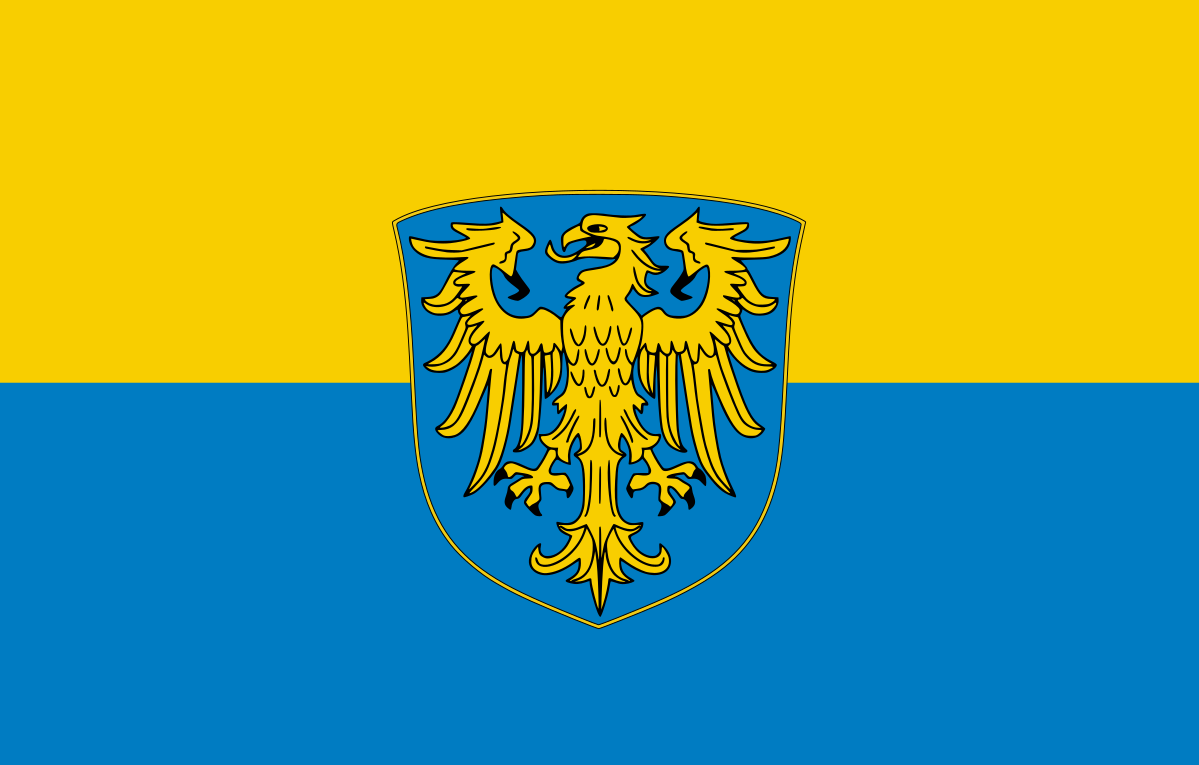

Website
- http://autonomia.pl
- Politics of Poland; Political parties; Elections; Old logo of the party from 2018.

The Silesian Autonomy Movement (Silesian: Ruch Autōnōmije Ślōnska, Polish: Ruch Autonomii Śląska, German: Bewegung für die Autonomie Schlesiens), abbreviated as RAŚ, is a movement that seeks the creation of an autonomous Silesia including a separate Silesian Treasury, a Silesian Parliament, as well as a Silesian constitution and an elected president. The party envisions an autonomous Silesia either within Poland, or as part of the Europe of 100 Flags, where the competences and sovereignty of modern states will be transferred to the regions. RAŚ considers Silesians a separate nation and promotes Silesian nationalism. The party supports regionalist and separatist movements in Europe, and has also been described as separatist itself.

In 2002, RAŚ became a member of the European Free Alliance. In 2007, RAŚ activists reestablished football club 1. FC Katowice. Also, since 2007 RAŚ has organized annual "Autonomy Marches" in Poland.

Nationally, the party is considered left-wing, and it is affiliated with Civic Coalition. In 2019, the RAŚ signed an agreement with the Civic Coalition for elections to the Sejm and Senate, in which both parties ran on a joint list in Upper Silesia. The two parties continued to cooperate afterwards, and the secretary of RAŚ, Jacek Tomaszewski, is also a member of the Civic Coalition.

== History ==
Silesia had been well known for its regional sense of identity and both separatist as well as autonomists ambitions. In 1869, Polish linguist Lucjan Malinowski wrote: "Silesian people shun from the Polish population". In Silesia at the end of the 19th century, the term Pole was offensive, and associated with groups of 'vagabonds' to the inhabitants of towns. Stereotypically, Poles were associated with migrant workers from Galicia, employed for manual labour in Silesian mines and factories - they had a bad reputation and were associated with brawls, drunkenness and theft, which alienated the local Silesian population. Silesians believed that they were a nation on their own and distanced themselves from Poland, often arguing that Silesian people have more in common with Germany than Poland. Szerzej Dobrowolski observed: "Our people are more similar to the German people with whom they neighbour to the west than to the Polish people in Galicia [...]. This mixed Silesian nationality is the necessary result of the historical development which our people have undergone; centuries ago they were separated from Poland, came under much better German rule, and, preserving their original language, acquired through contact with high German civilisation those qualities which make them superior to the people still under Polish rule".

In the Polish literature on the subject, such an attitude of the Silesian people was explained by "a lack of normal bonds with the Polish nation", which resulted, according to some authors, in "a stronger attachment to the region, regional pride". Despite the intensive activities of the Polish national movement at the turn of the 19th and 20th centuries in Silesia, and Polonisation in the interwar period, there was still a large group of Silesians who thought of themselves as a separate nation. Wojciech Korfanty believed that this was over 30% of the population of the Silesian Voivodeship. While Silesians did not manage to create a state, they formed a clearly defined cultural and linguistic community.

One of the first political organisations of separatist Silesians was the social-democratic Silesian People's Party (SPL), founded in 1909 by Józef Kożdoń, whose political goal was to promote regional culture and defend against Polish nationalism. After the First World War, states began to make claims to Silesian lands on the international arena. Silesian politicians did not look passively at the development of events, and in 1919, on the initiative of Edward Latacz and brothers Tomasz and Jan Regink, the Union of Upper Silesians was established in Bytom, which postulated the creation of an independent state in Upper Silesia with two official languages, Polish and German. After establishing contacts with Kożdoń's supporters, they wanted to include the lands of Cieszyn Silesia, Opava Silesia and the Sudetenland. The new state was to have a system similar to Switzerland. The project of the Silesian separatists was supported by industrialists and landowners including the Prince von Pless Alexander Hochberg and his Father Hans Heinrich XV von Hochberg, whose intention was to create a free Silesian state (Freistaat Schlesien) and to possibly crown Hochbergs as the Dukes of Silesia. Independence and territorial integrity were to be guaranteed by the world powers, in particular the United States.

An unfavourable international situation, opposition from France and the actions of Germany, Poland and Czechoslovakia led to the collapse of separatist Silesian project and the division of Silesia. Before this happened, however, a battle for the support of the Silesian population was fought by Poland and Germany. Each side promised Silesia wide autonomy within their own state. The Sejm of the Republic of Poland passed the Constitutional Act containing the Organic Statute of the Silesian Voivodeship on 15 July 1920. In turn, the Reichstag Act of 27 November 1920 on Upper Silesia provided that within two months from the date of the German takeover of the plebiscite area, a referendum would be held in the entire Upper Silesian province on the creation of an Upper Silesian state within the Reich. To this end, many Silesians partook in the Silesian uprising not for the incorporation of Silesia into Poland, but for autonomy, with most Silesians believing that autonomy within Poland would be the lesser evil.

After a part of Upper Silesia was annexed to Poland, separatist activity waned. The newly created Silesian Voivodeship became an arena of struggle between German and Polish influences, with no room for a third force. Silesians were forced to take one side or the other, because, as the then Silesian Voivode Michał Grażyński stated: "we Poles like clear-cut situations and value defined characters. That is why we respect honest Czechs and Germans, but we cannot tolerate any intermediate types". However, the policy of Polonisation was not appreciated by some Upper Silesians, which was reflected in the results of the municipal elections of 19 November 1926, also known as the second Silesian plebiscite. At that time, the majority of seats were won by German groupings, e.g. in Katowice - 56.7%, in Świętochłowice - 54.3%, and in Królewska Huta (Chorzów) - as much as 70.3%. Upper Silesians voted for German minority groupings (the German minority accounted for approximately 7% of the population of the Silesian Voivodeship).

The revival of Silesian regionalism did not take place until after 1989, with the collapse of the communist regime in Poland. According to some Silesians, the political breakthrough did not bring the expected changes. In 1990, the Silesian Autonomy Movement was founded, with the main aim of forcing the central authorities to change their attitude to Silesia. The association called for the restoration of the pre-war autonomy of Upper Silesia. It proposed, following the model of Western European regionalism, the introduction of strong autonomous provinces in Poland, which would be financially independent of the central government and would decide their own affairs independently. In 1993, RAŚ became a member of the League of Regions, an organisation postulating the division of Poland into 12 autonomous regions (its members also include the Upper Silesian Association, the Podhale Association and the Kashubian-Pomeranian Association).

The Silesian Autonomy Movement was founded on 13 January 1990 in Rybnik, in the Saint Jadwiga Śląska Church. There were 15 founders of the Silesian Autonomy Movement, composed of Catholic priest as well as Silesian social activists associated with the Catholic Church. The first ideological declaration of the RAŚ from 1990 was named "Movement for the Full Autonomy of Silesia", and focused fully on postulates for restoring the interwar autonomy of Silesia. The Silesian Autonomy Movement became a registered political association a year later, on 19 February 1991. The party co-organized the First Congress of the League of Regions in Poznań, in October 1994. The congress was attended by most major regionalist organizations in Poland, including the Union of Wielkopolska, the Kashubian-Pomeranian Association and the Union of Podhalans. The congress also included the future prime minister of Poland, Donald Tusk, who was back then a Kashubian regionalist.

The Silesian Autonomy Movement, as an organisation claiming to represent the interests of the region and the ethnic group, initially demanded in its political programme that the organic statute of the Silesian Voivodeship from 1920 be restored. The statute was abolished in 1945 by a decision of the National Council. The party argued that this was done in violation of the provisions of the March Constitution in force at the time. The activists of the Silesian Autonomy Movement demanded in 1995, in an open letter to the president of the Republic of Poland Lech Wałęsa, that the decision of the KRN abolishing the organic statute of the Silesian Voivodeship be annulled. Referring to the law of 15 July 1920, RAŚ wanted to establish the Silesian Treasury, which was to be funded from local taxes. Most of the tax revenue from the Silesian Voivodeship (up to 60%) was to remain in the region. Another initiative was the idea of reactivating the Silesian Sejm as a regional legislature and a popularly elected provincial governor - the regional executive. All but the last of these postulates was in fact a demand for a return to the 1920 legal status. A new idea was the direct election of a voivode, who in the pre-war Silesian Voivodeship was appointed by the president of the Republic of Poland upon the proposal of the Prime Minister.

The programme of the Silesian Autonomy Movement has evolved somewhat over the years, from supporting the idea of a return to pre-World War II autonomy to the project of a modern organic statute, whose authors modelled themselves on the autonomy solutions of Catalonia. The early years of the 21st century saw a generational change in the party's authorities. The members of the new party structures felt that the organic statute of 1920 corresponded to that reality, but that in the 21st century the situation required solutions that moved with the times. An expression of these trends was the new draft organic statute for Silesia, which was announced in 2010. According to the new draft, the autonomous unit would be called the Autonomous Region of Upper Silesia, which would form part of the territory of the Republic of Poland. Executive authority would be exercised by a prime minister together with a government, elected by a bicameral parliament. The government thus elected would be appointed by the president of the Republic of Poland. In addition to these political institutions, the region is to have its own administrative court, the Upper Silesian Administrative Court, whose president would be appointed by the President of Poland. The seat of the court would be in Opole.

In 1999, the Silesian Autonomy Movement became a member of the League of Regions, an organisation advocating the division of Poland into 12 autonomous or semi-independent nations. Members of the League include the Union of Greater Poland, the Upper Silesian Association, the Podhale Association and the Kashubian-Pomeranian Association. In 2003, it was admitted to the European Free Alliance (EFA) - a supranational representation of dozens of regional (separatist) movements seeking the abolition of the nation state. The European Free Alliance advocates a Europe of One Hundred Flags - because in their view - there are at least 100 nations and ethnic groups in Europe. The European Free Alliance advocates the establishment of constituencies for the European Parliament that correspond to the principles of regionalism.

In 2002, the Silesian Autonomy Movement fielded 14 candidates in Katowice constituency no. 572. In the elections to the Silesian Sejmik it did not exceed 5% (in this district 5% - 62,674 votes), 53,118 votes were cast for the RAŚ list. The situation was similar in 2006, when the Electoral Committee of the Silesian Autonomy Movement did not win any seats to the Sejmik of the Silesian Voivodeship, gaining 4.35% of the votes in the voivodeship and ranking behind PO, PiS and PSL, but ahead of Self-Defence of the Republic of Poland - 3.96% and League of Polish Families - 3.46%. The elections to the Silesian Voivodeship were held in 2006. By 2010, the autonomists had won elections in, among others, two rural municipalities (Lyski and Godów municipalities), and had several councillors in the Municipal Council in Czerwionka Leszczyny. They also co-governed the Rybnik district, where Krzysztof Kluczniok, chairman of the RAŚ in 1999–2002, was deputy mayor between 2006 and 2010.

The policy of supporting regionalism and explicitly excluding nationalist slogans in the programme caused some RAŚ members, for whom the issue of Silesian nationality was a priority, to establish a separate organisation - the Union of Silesian Nationalities. Some publicists believed that this decision was motivated by a desire to obtain the status of a national minority and thus to receive, like the German minority, a guaranteed pool of seats in parliament. Between 1997 and 2004, the founding committee was headed by the later chairman of the Silesian Autonomy Movement, Jerzy Gorzelik. In 2004, Silesian nationalist activists led by Andrzej Roczniok took over. Since then, relations between the two organisations have deteriorated. RAŚ activists claim that the ZLNŚ extreme harms the idea of regionalism. This was particularly evident in the RAŚ authorities' comments on the controversial statements made by the chairman of the Union of Silesian Nationalities, Andrzej Roczniok. Radical regionalists such as Dariusz Jerczyński would go on to create the Silesian Separatist Movement.

In the elections to the Sejm of the Republic of Poland and to the Senate of the Republic of Poland held on 25 September 2005, the Silesian Autonomy Movement placed its candidates on the lists of the agrarian Polish People's Party (PSL). This took place, among others, in the constituency comprising the districts of Mikołów, Racibórz, Rybnik and Wodzisław. As a result of an agreement concluded by the autonomists with the PSL as well as the Trade Union of Volunteer Fire Brigades, three candidates of the Silesian Autonomy Movement were on the lists for the Senate, and two for the Sejm. In the Opole Voivodeship, autonomy supporters ran from the lists of the German minority. The strategy of the autonomists did not bring the expected results, as none of the candidates was elected.

In 2004, the leader of RAŚ Jerzy Gorzelik also attempted to run for the European Parliament from the list of the National Electoral Committee founded by Maciej Płażyński. In the 2007 Polish parliamentary election, the recommendation of the Silesian Autonomy Movement was received by the candidates running on the PSL list for the Sejm in the Katowice constituency - Dietmar Brehmer (German Minority) and Grzegorz Juranek. The Senate candidate supported by RAŚ was Cecylia Machulska. In the Gliwice district, the regionalists formed the Autonomy for Upper Silesia Electoral Committee. The Senate candidate from this list was Jerzy Bogacki, vice-chairman of RAŚ. Regionalists also tried to get into the Sejm in this constituency from the PSL lists. In the Rybnik district, four candidates ran for the Sejm from the PSL lists, and Rudolf Kołodziejczyk, founder of RAŚ and ZLNŚ, ran for the Senate. None of them received a sufficient number of votes to enter parliament.

In June 2008, the RAŚ submitted a petition to the Polish prime minister's office to restore the autonomy of the Silesian Voivodeship. Heavily publicized, the petition was also reported by the Russian state newspaper Rossiyskaya Gazeta, which was accused of attempting to discredit the Silesian Autonomy Movement by praising its support for independence of Abkhazia and South Ossetia, and speculatig that Silesia could become "Polish Kosovo". After the petition was ignored by Polish authorities, leader of the party Jerzy Gorzelik argued that Silesian are increasingly frustrated by policies of Polonization and exploitation of Silesia's natural resources by the Polish state.

In December 2009, Silesian Autonomy Movement activists submitted a petition (signed by 5,000 people) to the Marshal of the Silesian Voivodship calling for the abandonment of plans to give the Silesian Stadium in Chorzów the white and red colours, so that the seats at the venue would be in the regional colours of yellow and blue.

In the 2010 Polish local elections, the Silesian Autonomy Movement, received around 123,000 votes, which amounted to the 8.49% of the popular vote, in the Silesian Voivodeship. The best result was achieved in the Chrzanów (17.5%), Katowice (16%) and Rybnik (14.6%) districts. In the district council of Rybnik, RAŚ won as much as 25.6% of the votes. This allowed for the introduction of three representatives to the Provincial Assembly; in addition, the party gained 40 councillor seats in the Silesian Voivodeship. Gorzelik, the party leader, became deputy speaker of the Silesian Sejmik. Silesian Autonomy Movement formed a regional coalition together with Civic Platform and Polish People's Party.

In 2011, the Silesian Autonomy Movement organized "pre-referendums" in Lędziny, Imielin and Pszczyna, during which the inhabitants were asked the question "Are you in favour of restoring to Upper Silesia the autonomy it had in Poland in the inter-war period?", as an attempt to popularise and publicise this topic. Around 1,700 were polled by the party, and it was found that 96,4% of participants supported Silesian autonomy. Polish political scientist Grzegorz Węgrzyn noted that polls conducted by the media in the 1990s showed a somewhat similar proportion of support, with support for autonomy reaching 70% of those surveyed. He also stated that "just as the census made many inhabitants of Upper Silesia aware of the possibility of an option other than Polish or German, the activities of the RAŚ introduced the issue of autonomy into the social discourse, both regionally and nationally."

== Polish parliamentary elections ==
The movement participated in the 1991 parliamentary elections and received 40,061 votes (0.36%) and two seats, one of its MPs was Kazimierz Świtoń.

In the 2001 parliamentary elections, two candidates of the movement were included on the lists of the Civic Platform (PO).

In the elections of 2005, several candidates from the movement, including its vice president Krzysztof Kluczniok, took part in the list of the Polish People's Party (PSL).

| Election year | Seats won | | +/– |
| Election year | Sejm | Senate | +/– |
|---|---|---|---|
| 1991 | 2 / 460 | — | ▲2 |
| 1993 | 0 / 460 | 0 / 100 | ▼2 |
| 1997 | — | 0 / 100 | Steady |
| 2001 | — | 0 / 100 | Steady |
| 2005 | — | 0 / 100 | Steady |
| 2007 | — | 0 / 100 | Steady |
| 2011 | — | 0 / 100 | Steady |
| 2015 | 0 / 460 | — | Steady |

== Ideology ==
The main representative of the party and its ideology is Jerzy Gorzelik, known for his controversial statements regarding the historical relations between Silesia and Poland. One of his most known statements include "To give Poland Silesia is like giving a monkey a watch, and after eighty years one can see that the monkey broke the watch." (paraphrase of a statement by David Lloyd George from Paris Peace Conference) and "I am a Silesian, not a Pole, and I have not pledged to Poland, so I have not betrayed her and I do not feel obliged to be loyal to this country." Gorzelik describes the party as being "between" nationalism and regionalism, condemning ethnic nationalism in the sense of a "perennial vision of the nation as a community shaped by the forces of history", emphasising party's belief in a "strictly modern and voluntarist nationalism" instead.

Speaking of its vision of regionalist Europe, the party wrote:

In the future Europe, the nation-states, having brought about the unification of the continent, will recede into the background and the regions will take the first row. Matters affecting Europeans will be decided almost at home - in Bavaria, in Wales, in Silesia, in Greater Poland (...). Whether we like it or not, the political map of Europe is not yet complete. Its future edition will include, in place of Spain, among others, Baskonia, Navarre, Catalonia, in place of Poland, Mazovia, Kuyavia, Warmia, Masuria, Greater Poland and Silesia. A continent thus united would be freed from all the conflicts into which the nation-states born by the 19th century had fallen. (...) It will be a Europe of peoples: Silesians, Moravians, Lusatians, Scots, Bretons, Basques, etc., i.e. a Europe returning to its roots. The RAŚ is already working for such a Europe, maintaining extensive contacts abroad, participating in international meetings and conferences.

The party cites Józef Kożdoń and his Silesian People's Party, as well as Ewald Latacz and his Union of Upper Silesians, as the main inspirations for the movement. According to Gorzelik, these two parties had risen at the time when Silesians already emphasised their regional identity beyond the division into Poles, Germans and Czechs. The struggle between Poland, Germany and Czechoslovakia for the ownership of the region resulted in indifference amongst the population, with many identifying themselves exclusively as Silesians and being ready to join whichever nation would give Silesia the greatest autonomy. Silesian Autonomy Movement therefore defines contemporary Silesian identity as inherently pluralist, with Gorzelik stating that "The concept adopted by the animators of the Silesian national movement is at odds with the monistic image of culture and identity propagated by integral nationalism. This is because it assumes multiculturalism. A Silesian is part Czech, part Moravian, part German or part Pole, without having to become any of them. Diversity is therefore at the centre of the Silesian national ideology, and its affirmation becomes the essence of Silesianness." As such, the party affirms that Silesian identity is completely compatible with Polish and European identity as well.

=== Autonomy ===
The party postulates decentralization of Poland based on the Spanish model for Catalonia, although with strong economic and financial elements that would allow Polish regions to manage local finances. Polish Senate is to be reformed and distribute its seats amongst autonomous voivodeships. The main proposal of RAŚ is the concept of "asymmetric decentralization", where the regions themselves would define their autonomous tasks based on the interests of the given area. As its goal is to decentralize Poland into culturally autonomous regions, RAŚ launched "Polish Regions" and "League of Regions" programs, which unite regionalist movements in Poland outside of Silesia. An example includes the Greater Polish Union, an organization founded in 1990 that promotes regionalism of the Greater Poland region.

According to party's programme, autonomy should not be the exclusive prerogative of Upper Silesia, but a right of all regions, distributed according to the principles of a regional state, citing the territorial system of Spain and its tradition of localism known as Fuero as a model to follow. The party considers decentralisation and workplace democracy necessary steps towards ensuring economic prosperity of Silesia, arguing that the economy must be controlled by the local workers and community. Socially, RAŚ declares that Silesian autonomy is required for the preservation of Silesian language and culture. On economic matters, the party believes that the main problem in Silesia is demographics. According to RAŚ, the hallmark 500+ social program of Law and Justice does not fully solve the problem and instead Silesia needs massive social investment based on "revitalisation of industrial towns, the repair of public spaces and public transport" as well as "modern education".

=== Foreign policy ===
The party has an ambiguous stance on the European Union. On one hand, it is considered pro-European with German political scientist Reinhard C. Heinisch writing: "RAŚ and ŚPR have adopted a more pro-European and cosmopolitan approach, although this does not involve abandoning their promotion of the traditional values of the region." However, the party also criticized support for the European Union - in its newspaper Jaskółka Śląska, RAŚ stated: "Among Upper Silesian autonomists, this sympathy is often reinforced by the conviction that the EU is exceptionally pro-regional, contrasted in this narrative with the more supposedly centralist nation-states. Reality, however, prompts a revision of this view." The party argues that the European Union has failed to put any pressure on its nation states to share power more equally with the regions and respect the aspirations of regional cultures, and instead autonomous regions only exists because of some member states having and retaining their tradition of pluralism and power dispersion. RAŚ believes that the European Union has amassed too much power and control over the member states' sovereignty, which runs contrary to the demands of Silesian regionalism:

For years, the key economic demand of the RAŚ has been fiscal autonomy. Meanwhile, the logic of EU development is now leading to depriving not only the regions, but also the nation-states, of it. What is more, under more favourable conditions - i.e. if the Poles had made a better choice in May 2003, leaving Poland out of the Union - it could have been supplemented by monetary autonomy, so the right to issue one's own currency, which - astonishing nowadays - was not at all exotic in the not so distant past, as it was still demanded 20 years ago by the young Donald Tusk for a future autonomous Kashubia. Unfortunately, this is impossible today - not only the regions, but even the central banks of those EU countries that have already managed to join the Eurozone do not enjoy independence in monetary policy. Poland will sooner or later join them. One currency, one tax system and economic policy for the entire continent, all implemented in the privacy of offices by officials anonymous to most citizens.

In its publications, RAŚ compares Silesia to Bavaria, especially in terms of unique cultures and national separation, as well as in that the party believes that Silesia should have autonomy comparable to that of Bavaria. It cites the old programs of Polish parties, such as that of the Civic Platform, which in its 2011 program included a proposal to significantly decentralise the disposal of public funds to local governments, as well as one to cede various powers of the central government to local ones. The Silesian Autonomy Movement argues that just like Bavaria, Silesia should have a separate and unique political partisan system, have its own, separate constitution that would be approved by Silesians in a referendum, have freedom to determine its own judicial and devolution systems, as well as have rights to influence the constitution and Sejm of Poland itself.

Some of the party's statements on international matters sparked controversy. The Silesian Autonomy Movement supported Russia in the Russo-Georgian War and appealed to Polish government to recognize independence of Abkhazia and South Ossetia. RAŚ also works together with the Basque Nationalist Party, organizing employment for Silesian miners in Spain. The party also spoke in favour of Basque independence and Scottish independence, arguing that Scots and Basques do not need "London or Madrid". RAŚ also supported the 2017 Catalan independence referendum, endorsed the Catalan declaration of independence, and supports the broader Catalan independence movement.

=== Ideological spectrum ===
The party is placed on the left side of the Polish political spectrum - Katarzyna Stelmach wrote that "in its election appeal, the party used 'equality' arguments that brought it close to the rhetoric presented by SLD Left Together." In 2012, liberal conservative newspaper Rzeczpospolita argued that RAŚ incorporates far-left elements into its rhetoric, such as the vehement opposition to Polish nationalism. The party was also compared to left-wing nationalist movements in Catalonia in terms of both program and rhetoric. Silesian Autonomy Movement did declare its support for nationalist Catalan movements, and also supports Catalan separatism. In Polish politics, RAŚ consistently aligns with the Civic Coalition and formed coalition government in Upper Silesia with the Civic Platform in 2010 and then again in 2015. Both parties took their cooperation further in 2019 by forming joint electoral lists for the 2019 Polish parliamentary election.

Political commentators also highlighted the rhetoric used by the party, such as its pledge to end the "colonial treatment of Silesia" by Warsaw. Polish political scientist Magdalena Solska argued that the Silesian Autonomy Movement is a left-wing populist party, being an example of a "left-wing, progressive regionalist populism" as contrasted with the "right-wing national conservative" populism of Law and Justice, a party that ruled Poland between 2015 and 2023. She also noted that together with other left-wing parties such as the Polish Initiative and Polish Greens, the party included plans to phase out coal in its election program, despite the economic reliance of Silesia on this resource. In addition, the Silesian Autonomy Movement campaigned against unjust wealth redistribution in the socioeconomic sense, while also postulating regional redistribution. For the latter, the party used the slogan "Silesian Money for Silesian People”, inspired directly by the slogan “It’s Scotland’s Oil!” used by left-leaning Scottish National Party. The party also called for clean coal technology, soil detoxification and renewable energy.

The party itself also noted sharing many similarities with the proposals of left-wing parties, with RAŚ highlighting, amongst others, its fierce opposition to conscription and draft, instead arguing for a strictly voluntary army. The party also stated that after the downfall of the socialist system in Poland, Silesia and Poland at large found itself in slow decline, characterized by "emigration, environmental degradation, the selling off of assets and the death of hundreds of industrial plants industries". The party believes that the "central management" of Poland had been a "spectacular failure", and that "all attempts to rebuild a regional identity are sought to disgust the people of Silesia, because a mob without its own convictions is easier to steer to keep the tax stream flowing in the right direction." RAŚ is also critical of what it described as attempts to deflect the culpability of Silesian oppression from Poland to communism. According to RAŚ, it was Polish nationalism rather than communism that fuelled the anti-Silesian policies, arguing that Polish communism was mixed with nationalism in varying proportions, and because of that pursued a nationally homogenous state, which the capitalist Poland continues to pursue. The party also noted that communism recognizes the existence of nations and their relevance to class conflicts, and that in itself communism is not cosmopolitan either.

=== Religion ===
The Silesian Autonomy Movement is supportive of the Roman Catholic Church, and the party was founded by 15 Silesian priests and Catholic activists in January 1990. RAŚ argues that the Catholic Church used to be a "refuge of Silesianness" in the 19th century, and wishes to restore this cultural position of the Church. The party is strongly critical of Catholic nationalist and conservative Catholic currents in Poland, in particularly noting their hostility towards Silesian regionalism and constructing the myth of "Pole equals Catholic". In its newspaper Jaskółka Śląska, RAŚ declared that the anti-Silesian or nationalist currents amongst Polish Catholics represent a minority and advises Silesians to rather listen to "the hierarchs of Rome than to those of Warsaw". The party also wrote that "The [Catholic] Church and [Silesian] regionalist tradition are inextricably linked".

== International contacts ==
Since its inception, the Silesian Autonomy Movement has established cooperation with other European regionalists. Already in the 1990s, the Silesian Autonomy Movement cooperated with regional movements from the Czech Republic (Movement for Self-Governing Democracy - Association for Moravia and Silesia HSD-SMS) and Italy (Piedmont League and Lombard League). RAŚ is also a co-founder of the European Free Alliance (2004), co-author of the group's political programme - the Barcelona Declaration. Within this organisation, Silesian autonomists cooperate with regionalists from EU countries, mainly Scotland, Wales, Friesland, South Tyrol and Spain (Basques, Catalans). In 2008, the vice-president of Bilbao, Ibon Areso Mendiguren, a member of the Basque Nationalist Party (PNV), came to Katowice at the invitation of the RAŚ. During the visit, the future of Katowice was discussed, and comparisons were made between the path that the two industrial cities have travelled and the impact that the acquisition of political and fiscal autonomy has had on the development of Bilbao.

RAŚ also maintains contacts with organisations from Central Europe and Hungary from Slovakia (Party of Slovak Regions), Lusatian Serbs (Lusatian People's Party), Hungarians from Transylvania (Forum of Hungarians and Szeklers). Members of the Silesian Autonomy Movement take part in conferences organised by regionalist groups, e.g. the Basque Nationalist Party (PNV) entitled "Europa ante su futuro", where the situation of regionalists in Poland was presented. A group of RAŚ youth activists visited the Basque Country in 2010, where they represented Silesia at a convention of youth organisations on the 'Right to self-determination of communities in contemporary Europe'. The event was organised by Euzko Gaztedi, the youth branch of the Basque Nationalist Party (PNV). Where the Silesian Autonomy Movement does not have legal representation, its members set up organisations and websites dedicated to the idea of autonomy in Upper Silesia: Initiative für Autonomie Schlesiens e.V. (Germany), Silesian Autonomy Movement UK (UK) and Bevegelsen for Autonomia Silesia (Norway).

The Silesian Autonomy Movement cooperates with like-minded organisations advocating a decentralised Europe in which most of the competences of the nation-states will be transferred to the historic regions. They envisage a Europe of peoples: Silesians, Moravians, Lusatians, Scots, Bretons, Basques. Poland is to become a decentralised state. The RAŚ is "part of the European family of parties, regionalist and autonomist movements, and advocates a Europe of regions, according to the concept of a 'Europe of 100 flags'." The Europe of 100 flags as envisioned by Silesian Autonomy Movement would include replacing the nation-states of contemporary Europe such as Poland and Spain with regionalised, sovereign nations, such as Silesia, Moravia, Lusatia, Scotland, Brittany, Basque Country, Catalonia, Bavaria and Wales. The party also supports the autonomist and regionalist efforts of other nations in Poland, such as Kashubia and Masuria.

== Local elections ==
=== Polish local elections, 2006 ===
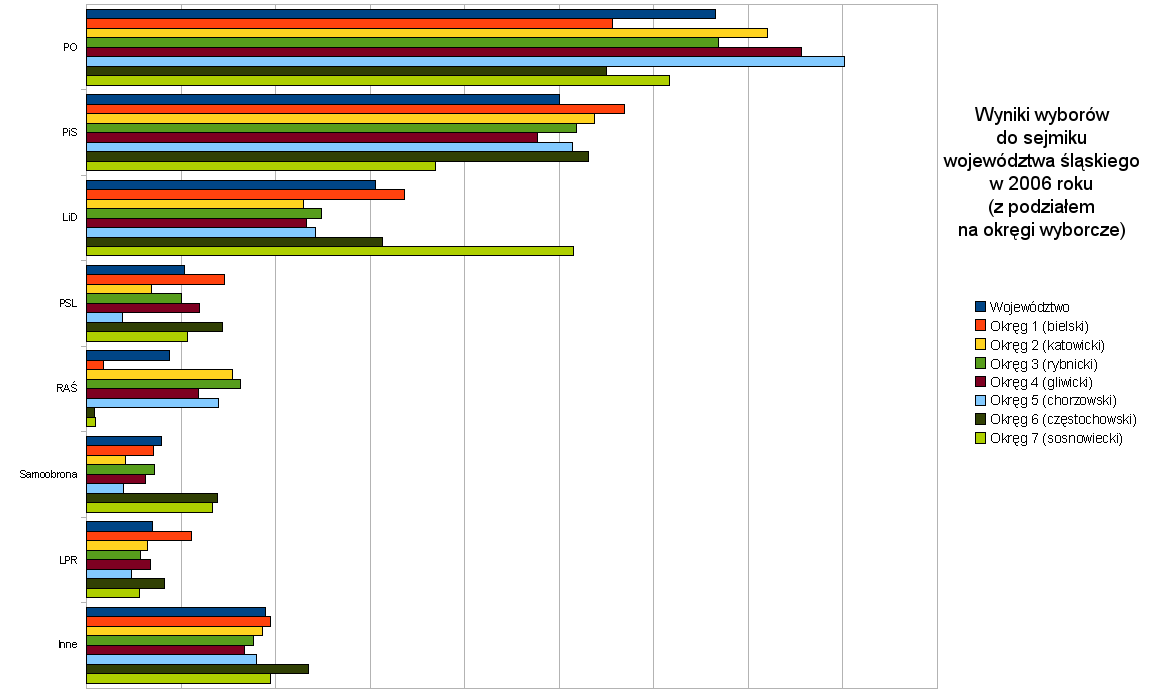
The results of the elections in Polish local election 2006, divided into committees and constituencies

In the 2006 Polish local elections, the movement did not win a single seat in the sejmik of the Silesian Voivodeship, gaining 4.35% of the popular vote. It finished behind the main parties: Civic Platform (PO), Law and Justice (PiS), Democratic Left Alliance (SLD) and Polish People's Party (PSL), but ahead of other parties such as Self-Defense of the Republic of Poland (Samoobrona), which won 3.96%, and the League of Polish Families (LPR), which won 3.46%. In Opole Voivodeship, RAŚ won 1.46% of all ballots. RAŚ won mandates in a few municipalities and county councils: in Katowice (7.7% of the popular vote), Ruda Śląska (9.39%), Zabrze (5.71%), Tychy (5.1%), Bytom (6.8%), Mysłowice (8.3%) and Gliwice county (7.54%), Bieruń-Lędziny county (10.4%), Tarnowskie Góry county (7.73%), Siemianowice Śląskie (4.94%), Piekary Śląskie (5.06%), Rybnik county (8.1%).

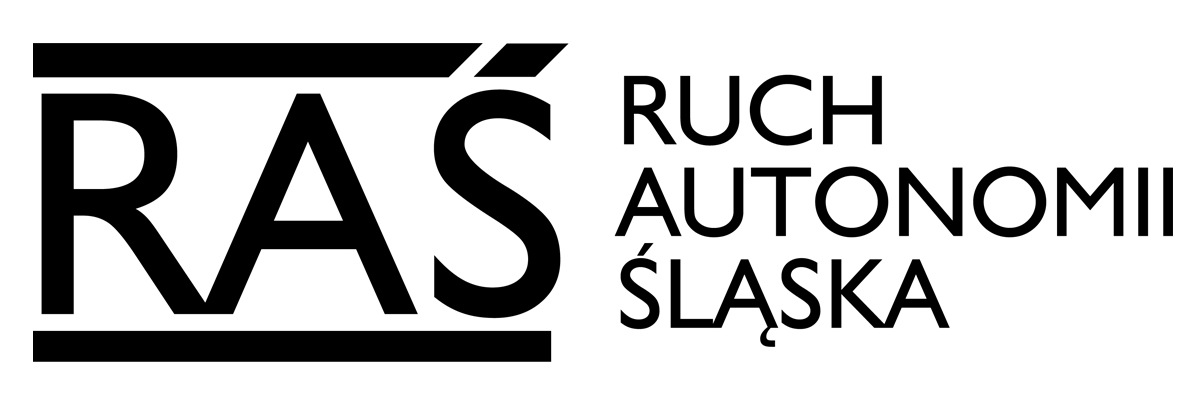
Former RAS logo

=== Polish local elections, 2010 ===
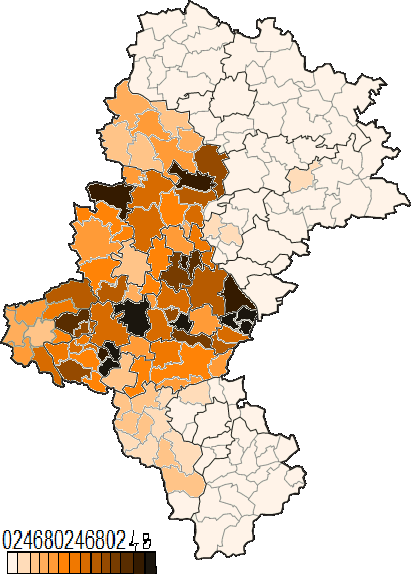
The movement's results at the Polish local election 2010

In the 2010 Polish local elections, the movement got three seats (for Jerzy Gorzelik, Henryk Mercik, Janusz Wita) in the sejmik of the Silesian Voivodeship, gaining 8.5% of the popular vote. It is double the result of the previous elections (in 2006). It placed RAŚ after the main parties in Poland: Civic Platform (PO), Law and Justice (PiS) and Democratic Left Alliance (SLD), but ahead of other main National parties: Polish People's Party (PSL), Self-Defense of the Republic of Poland (Samoobrona) and the League of Polish Families (LPR).

In the Silesian part of the Silesian Voivodeship RAŚ had the following percentage of votes: Chorzów area - 17,50%, Katowice area - 15.96%, Rybnik area - 14.57%, Gliwice area - 8.70% and Bielsko-Biała area - 1.58% (actually only half of Bielsko-Biała lies within Silesia). Generally, the average result in Silesia within the Silesian Voivodeship (Katowice, Chorzów, Rybnik and Gliwice areas) was nearly 15%.

In districts of the Silesian Voivodeship which lie outside of the historical Silesian region RAŚ had the following support percentage: Sosnowiec area - 1.37% and Częstochowa area - 0.69%. Towns, cities, communes or municipality councils: Gmina Godów - (10 of 15 seats), Gmina Lyski - (8 of 12 seats), Gmina Cisek - 41.26% (4 seats), powiat rybnicki - 25.61% (5 seats), Czerwionka-Leszczyny 20.48% (4 seats), Mysłowice - 9.29% (2 seats), Katowice - 8.86%, Chorzów - 8.69%, Ruda Śląska - 8.18%, powiat wodzisławski - 7.91%, Powiat Opolski - 5.27%, powiat bieruńsko-lędziński - 4.54% and Gmina Gaszowice (1 seat), Gmina Marklowice (1 seat).

Candidates in the towns, cities, communes or municipalities majors: Gmina Godów - 90.3%, Gmina Lyski - 64.67%, Mysłowice - 9.79%, Ruda Śląska - 7.75%, Chorzów - 7.61%, Rybnik - 3.78%. RAŚ in comparison with the other parties did not have a developed election campaign, moreover, RAŚ is not a political party but a social organization.

==== Silesian Regional Assembly ====
| Political groups | Mandates |
|---|---|
| Platforma Obywatelska | 22 |
| Prawo i Sprawiedliwość | 11 |
| Sojusz Lewicy Demokratycznej | 10 |
| Ruch Autonomii Śląska | 3 |
| Polskie Stronnictwo Ludowe | 2 |
| Total | 48 |

=== Polish local elections, 2014 ===
==== Silesian Regional Assembly ====
| Political groups | Mandates |
|---|---|
| Platforma Obywatelska | 17 |
| Prawo i Sprawiedliwość | 16 |
| Polskie Stronnictwo Ludowe | 5 |
| Ruch Autonomii Śląska | 4 |
| SLD Lewica Razem | 3 |
| Total | 45 |

=== Polish local elections, 2018 ===
The 2018 local elections were considered an electoral defeat for the party, as the party finished 8th and captured 3.10% of the popular vote in the Silesian voivodeship, which was not enough to win any seat. That election, the Silesian Autonomy Movement ran on the behalf of the Silesian Regional Party; after the election, the leadership of the Silesian Autonomy Movement acknowledged that it was a mistake, as while the move was an attempt to unite the Silesian regionalists, it ended up confusing voters. Political commentators also noted the presence of the Silesians Together party, which ran separately and won 3.23% of the popular vote.

==== Silesian Regional Assembly ====
| Political groups | Mandates |
|---|---|
| Prawo i Sprawiedliwość | 22 |
| Platforma Obywatelska | 20 |
| SLD Lewica Razem | 2 |
| Polskie Stronnictwo Ludowe | 1 |
| Total | 45 |

=== Polish local elections, 2024 ===
In the 2024 elections, the party tried to enter the Silesian Regional Assembly and thus gain at least one seat. The Silesian Autonomy Movement did not run on the list of the Silesian Regional Party and instead registered its own electoral committee and electoral lists. However, the party failed to gain any seats, winning 3.21% of the popular vote, which was only slightly more than its 2018 result. The Silesian Autonomy Movement was also unable to reach angreement with Silesians Together, who again ran independently and won 2.34% of the popular vote. The media attributed the electoral failure of Silesian regionalists to the fact that most Polish mainstream parties pledged to recognize the Silesian language as an official regional language in Poland, which undermined the appeal of the Silesian Autonomy Movement.

==== Silesian Regional Assembly ====
| Political groups | Mandates |
|---|---|
| Koalicja Obywatelska | 20 |
| Prawo i Sprawiedliwość | 18 |
| Trzecia Droga | 5 |
| Nowa Lewica | 2 |
| Total | 45 |

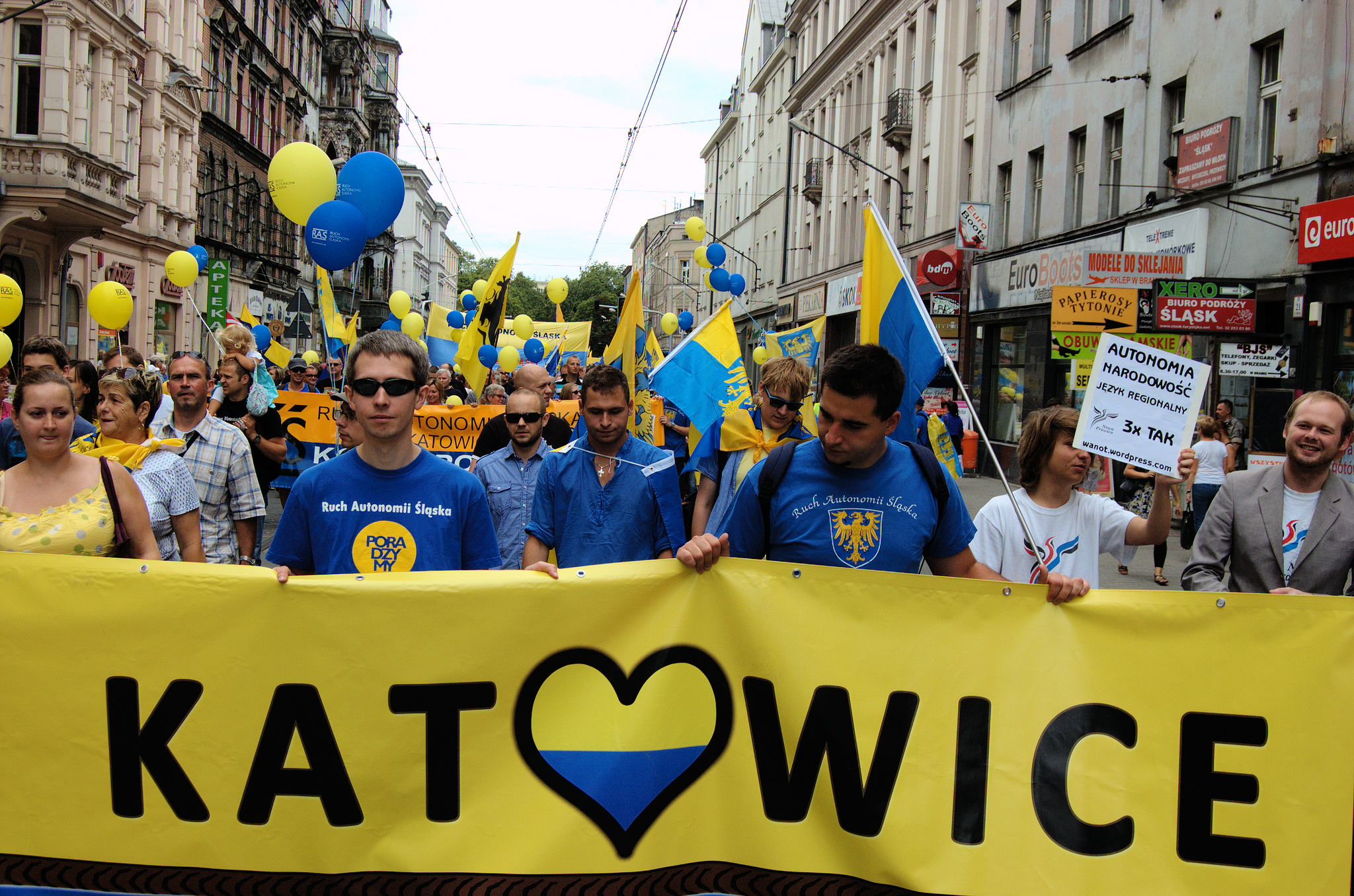
Autonomy March in 2012

== Controversies ==
- In 2000 the Polish Office For State Protection warned in its report that RAŚ may be a potential threat to Poland's interests.
- In 2007, reestablishment of the 1. FC Kattowitz soccer club by the RAŚ activists caused controversy. 1. FC Kattowitz was a soccer club established in 1905 by Germans, the club played in the German football league. Following the Silesian Uprisings in 1921 and a subsequent League of Nations plebiscite, part of the region – including Kattowitz – was granted to Poland and the name of the city was changed to Katowice. With the transfer of the city of Katowice to Poland, the name of the club was Polonized in 1922 to 1. Klub Sportowy Katowice. That same year, the membership of the club successfully challenged the change in court and won the right to play as 1. FC Kattowitz. By 1924, the team was part of regional Polish competition and playing as 1. FC Katowice. Katowice faltered in 1929 and was relegated from first division Polish football, descending to play in the regional Silesian league where they became champions in 1932.

In June 1939, the club's activities were suspended by Polish authorities when they were accused of promoting and supporting the interests of Nazi Germany (through the 1930s, club was overtaken by the radical pro-Nazi nationalists from the Jungdeutsche Partei). After the German invasion of Poland which began World War II in September 1939, the team resumed play with German authorities looking to hold up 1. FC Kattowitz as a model side in Upper Silesia for propaganda purposes.

- In 2010, controversy sparked over the controversial photo on the official RAŚ site. The photo itself showed a young man who held a trophy in his hand and diploma in the other while behind him was a commemorative plaque with words in German "Zum gedenken den gefallenen" (In memory of the fallen), above the plaque was the Iron Cross with dates 1939-1945. On the sides of the commemorative plaque were Silesian and modern Germany flags. When the scandal broke, the Silesian Autonomy Movement has been accused by some of being a "Volksdeutsche organization which real goal is to break the Silesia region from Poland and return it to Germany" and also a "German fifth column in Poland". The photo vanished from the RAŚ site as soon as it was acknowledged in the media. Ryszard Czarnecki, a Polish politician who is a Member of the European Parliament for the Lower Silesian and Opole constituency from Law and Justice, stated on his official Europarliament site that: "On the one hand it proves how contumely and effrontery are Silesian separatists, on the other Polish media can play a positive role only if they want to oppose such iniquity, such defamation of the fallen Poles [who died] from the German hands during the II World War. One must want and can place a dam on this pro-German effrontery."

Meanwhile, writing in a party document entitled "The State of the Nation", the Law and Justice (PiS) leader, Jarosław Kaczyński, said “Being a Silesian is a simple way to cut ties [with a Polish identity], and indeed could be a way to camouflage a German identity”. At a later press conference, the former Prime Minister said that anybody who declared their Silesian nationality was in some way “declaring their Germaness”.

- Jerzy Gorzelik, the current leader and representative of the Silesian Autonomy Movement, has claimed numerous times that he is not Polish by nationality but rather "Upper Silesian". He once stated: I'm Silesian, not Polish. My fatherland is Upper Silesia. I did not pledge anything to Poland nor I promised anything to it so it means that I did not betray it. The state called the Republic of Poland, of which I'm a citizen, refused to give me and my friends a right to self-determination and so that's why I do not feel obligated to loyalty towards this country.

In 2010, Gorzelik was elected to the Sejmik of Silesian Voivodeship. Upon taking a councillor's seat in the Sejmik, he swore an oath (as is mandatory for every councilor of each Voivodeship Sejmik), and thus automatically pledged loyalty to the Republic of Poland (before Gorzelik was elected, oaths were always sworn collectively in the Sejmik of the Silesian Voivodeship). The oath reads as follows:

I do solemnly swear to honestly and diligently carry out my duties to the Polish nation, to protect the sovereignty and the interests of the Polish State, to do everything for the prosperity of the Fatherland, for the community of the autonomous government of the Voivodeship and for the good of its citizens, and to abide by the Constitution and other laws of the Republic of Poland.

- Fear of separatism, instead of officially declared autonomy, was flamed up by some publications in "Jaskółka Śląska" - RAŚ's official magazine. Articles were published that openly called for a sovereign, independent Silesian state.

== Leadership ==
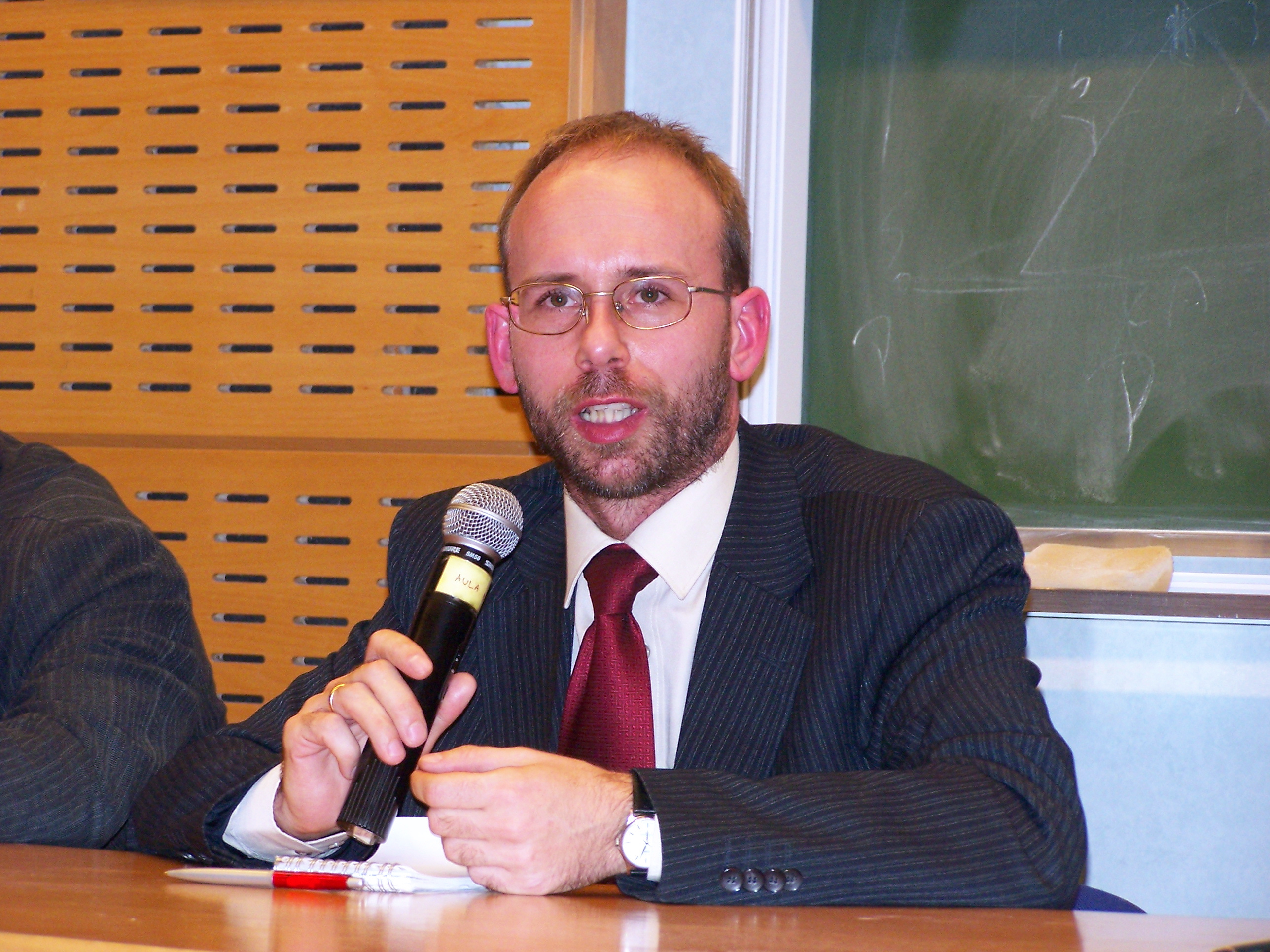
dr Jerzy Gorzelik

- Paweł Musioł (1991–1995)
- Zenon Wieczorek (1995–1999)
- Krzysztof Kluczniok (1999–2003)
- Jerzy Gorzelik (since 2003)

== See also ==
- Union of Upper Silesians
- Silesian People's Party
- Silesian Regional Party
- German Minority (political party)
- Silesians Together
