= Silesians Together =

Silesians Together Ślonzoki Razem
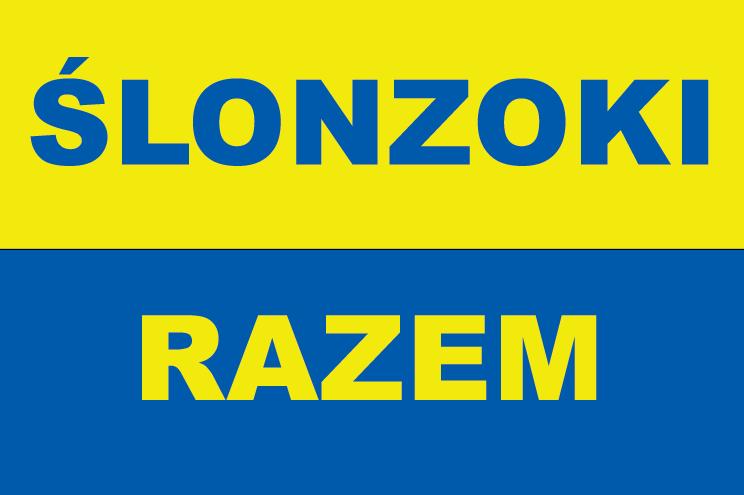
- Chairperson: Leon Swaczyna
- Secretary: Andrzej Roczniok
- Founded: 2017
- Headquarters: Chorzów
- Ideology: Localism; Silesian autonomism Silesian regionalism Decentralization; Federalism; Linguistic separatism German minority interests Silesian separatism (minority)
- Political position: Centre-left
- National affiliation: Polish Coalition
- Regional affiliation: Silesian Regional Party
- Colours: Cerulean Blue; Gold
- Vice Chairperson: Jerzy Bogacki
- Sejm: 0 / 460
- Senate: 0 / 100
- European Parliament: 0 / 53
- Regional assemblies: 0 / 552

Silesians Together (official name in Silesian-Polish mix: Ślonzoki Razem, name in Silesian: Ślōnzŏki Cuzamyn, Polish: Ślązacy Razem) is Silesian regionalist political party in Poland founded in August 2017 by Witold Berus, Andrzej Roczniok (Union of People of Silesian Nationality, formerly the Silesian Autonomy Movement) and Leon Swaczyna (formerly the Silesian Autonomy Movement). The party was founded with the idea of creating a Silesian party that would work with the German minority, a concept that originated in 2014.

The party is not officially in favor of Silesian independence. It believes that the pre-war autonomy of the Silesian Voivodeship should be restored. However, politicians of Silesians Together does not exclude the support of the project of the independent Silesian state in the event that this project is supported by the majority of Silesians. Silesians Together is considered the most secessionist party in Silesia, often stressing the separation of Silesian culture from Polish culture and emphasising the existence of a separate Silesian nation; many of the party's activists also hold separatist views.

== History ==
In the 2018 local elections, Silesians Together formed its own election committees in few constituencies. In the 2019 European elections, its politicians started from lists of Poland Fair Play and Kukiz'15. For parliamentary elections in the same year Silesians Together became part of Polish Coalition led by Polish People's Party. The leader of the party, Leon Swaczyna, stated that while he is strongly opposed to Law and Justice and is willing to cooperate with the national opposition, he was deeply disappoined by Civic Platform and endorsed voters outside Silesia to support Polish People's Party instead. In a summit of the Polish Coalition, the coalition pledged to promote social welfare and green energy initiatives, along with Silesian initiatives such as including the Silesian language in the law as a regional language, and introduce teaching it at schools as additional subject for willing people.

Elaborating on the role of Silesians Together in Polish Coalition, Leon Swaczyna declared that the party wishes to promote regional identities and local diversity in the rest of Poland as well: "Our aim is to enter the Polish parliament in order to persuade other parliamentarians to form sister parties, i.e. Masovians Together, Greater Poland People Together, Pomeranians Together, etc., and so that it will finally be understood in Poland that the Polish system is incompatible with rapid development. The economy develops fastest when people feel that their work, their development benefits first and foremost their land, and only a part of it is at the disposal of the centre. Money is needed to be able to educate and raise the next generation. We don't want the next generation to be cosmopolitan, to forget the heritage they come from."

In April 2023, the leadership of the party held a meeting with members of the Silesian Regional Party, and pledged to form a regional coalition for future local elections.

In the 2023 Polish parliamentary election, the party contested two Senate seats in Upper Silesia. The party ran a left-wing, but modest, campaign; it proposed expanding Polish welfare with programs such as pension inheritance (spouses inheriting their loved one's pension upon their death), converting Silesia to renewable energy sources such as wind farms, photovoltaics and nuclear power plants to prevent unemployment caused by coal mine shutdowns, expanding Silesian infrastructure and recognition of Silesian people as an ethnic minority in Poland. The first party candidate, Leon Swaczyna, won 13.44% of the vote, while the second one, Adam Pustelnik, won 10.74%. Ultimately, the party failed to win either seat and won 50,274 votes in total.

== Election results ==
=== Senate ===
Election	Votes	%	Seats	Change	Government
2023	50.274	0.23 (#19)	0 / 460	0	Extra-parliamentary
The party only contested two Upper Silesian seats, where its total share of the vote was 12%. As a part of Third Way, which won 65 seats in total.

=== European Parliament ===
Election	Leader	Votes	%	Seats	+/–	EP Group
2024	Leon Swaczyna	20,308	0.17 (#8)	0 / 53	New	–
2024	In a joint list with NK, that didn't win any seat.					

=== Regional assemblies ===
Election	Votes	%	Seats	+/−
2018	56,388	0.37 (#15)	0 / 552	New
2024	36,730	0.25 (#13)	0 / 552	0

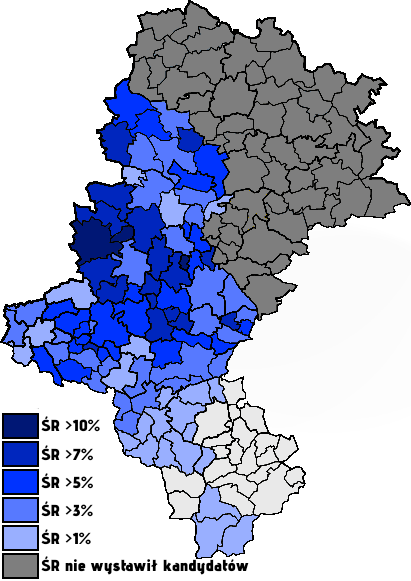
2018 Polish local elections in Silesian Voivodeship

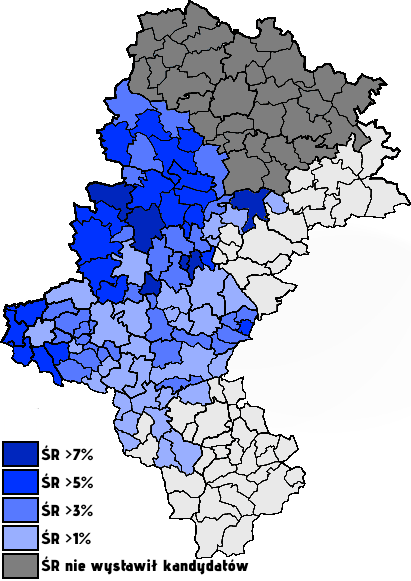
2024 Polish local elections in Silesian Voivodeship

== Ideology ==
The party has an ethno-regionalist character, with its programme defining the preservation of Silesian identity as the most important issue for the party. Silesians Together cooperate with the German minority in Silesia, and promote minority languages such as Silesian German and Czech Silesian, in addition to the Silesian language itself. The party wishes to consolidate and integrate the Silesian community, while also financing the teaching of and preserving the Silesian language, as well as regional German and Czech dialects. The party also plans to support the development and preservation of Silesian culture and traditions. Silesian Together considers Polish a "foreign language", and expressed concerns that the Polonization of Silesia through the domination of the Polish language in schools and offices will strip Silesians of their culture and heritage. The party considers it very important to make Silesian a language of education and administration in Silesia.

The party argues that Silesia does not share common history with Poland, and underwent a separate cultural and historical development from that of Poland between the 12th and 20th centuries. Silesians Together consider local autonomy an integral part of Silesian history, as Silesia was autonomous in the Czech state, the Austrian state and also in interwar Poland. The party sees Silesian as an independent language rather than an ethnolect of Polish and calls for its revival, arguing that Silesian had been relegated to the role of a "household language" due to its exclusion from most media, official communication, and education. The party also claims that the modern Silesian Voivodeship is "Silesian in name only" as significant part of it is culturally Lesser Polish rather than Silesian. To this end, the party pledges to allow culturally Polish lands to possibly secede from autonomous or independent Silesia.

Silesians Together advocate for further decentralisation of Poland through the introduction of autonomous powers and solutions, especially in the area of financial autonomy, as the interwar autonomous Silesia had its own treasury. According to the party programme, Poland should be divided into autonomous regions with legislative prerogatives and separate regional treasuries; financial autonomy is to apply to municipalities as well. The party's suggested solution is to empower municipalities and allow them to collect and pool all public revenues such as taxes and fees on their territory and transfer part of them to the autonomous region, and further to the central government itself. The programme envisages the boundaries of the autonomous regions within their historical boundaries.

In the 2023 election, the party proposed to introduce pension inheritance; upon death of a pensioner, their spouse would be entitled to 100% of the pension. The party argues that this program, while more ambitious than the one in Germany (where the spouse inherits 20-50% of the pension), is necessary given how low Polish pensions are. The party also attacked the policy of closing coal mines in Silesia, believing that the current energy transition policy is careless and results in unemployment and poverty in Silesia. The alternative proposed by the party is to build renewable energy sources such as wind farms, photovoltaics and nuclear power stations; only then were the mines be slowly decommissioned.

== See also ==
- Union of Upper Silesians
- Silesian People's Party
- Silesian Regional Party
- German Minority (political party)
- Silesian Autonomy Movement
