= Silesian Regional Party =

Silesian Regional Party Ślōnskŏ Partyjŏ Regiōnalnŏ
- Abbreviation: ŚPR
- Leader: List: Marek Nowara (2018–2019); Rafał Adamus (2019–2021); Henryk Mercik (2021–2022); Ryszard Ucher (2022-2023); Ilona Kanclerz (since 2023)
- Founded: 21 June 2017; 9 years ago
- Headquarters: Katowice
- Youth wing: Młodzi Regionaliści Śląscy
- Membership (2019): ~300
- Ideology: Silesian regionalism Silesian autonomism Linguistic separatism
- Political position: Centre-left
- Regional affiliation: Silesians Together
- Colours: Blue; Yellow

Party flag
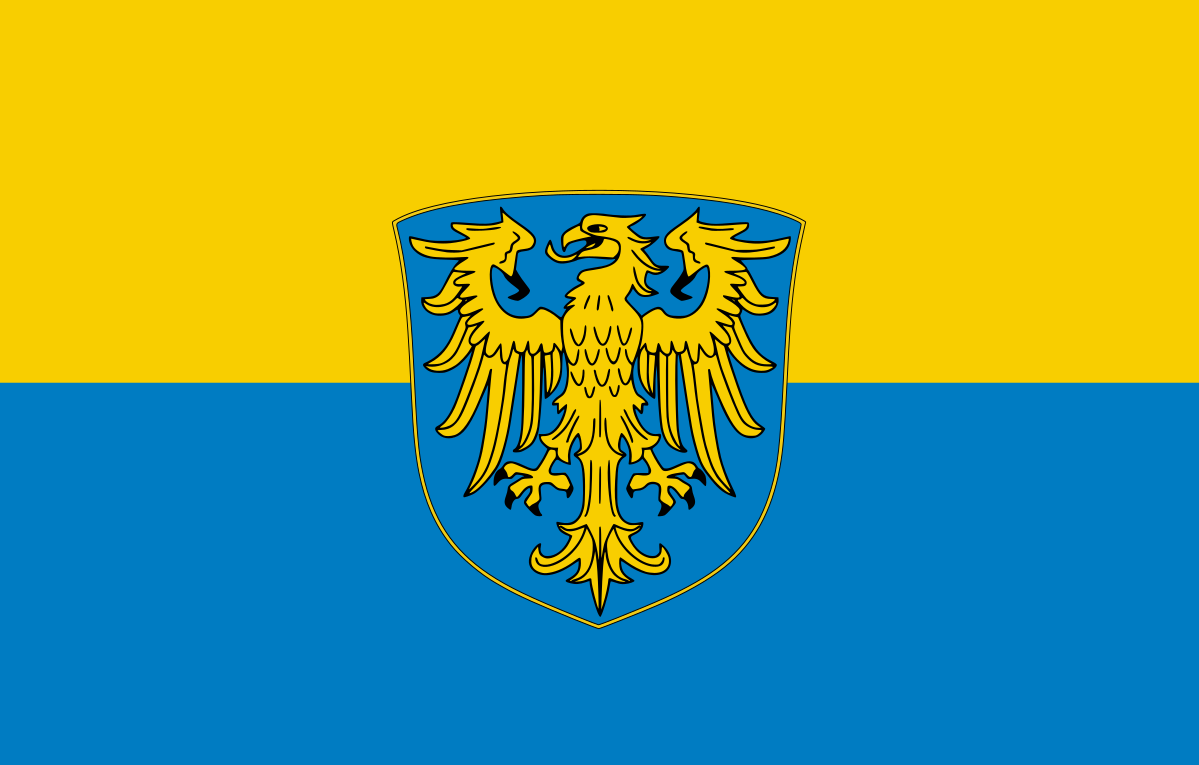

Website
- partiaslaska.pl

Silesian Regional Party (Silesian: Ślōnskŏ Partyjŏ Regiōnalnŏ, German: Schlesische Regionalpartei, Polish: Śląska Partia Regionalna, ŚPR) registered as Regionalists (Polish: Regionaliści) since 2024, is a regionalist political party in Poland's Upper Silesia. It was founded on 21 June 2017 and registered on 12 April 2018. The party brought together members of the Silesian Autonomy Movement, the Upper Silesian Union, the Silesian Ferajn, the Democratic Union of Silesian Regionalists, the Union of Silesians, the Silesian Alliance, as well as independent local government officials and local leaders. Nationally, the party was previously affiliated with the Civic Coalition in 2019 and ran on its behalf in some electoral districts of Upper Silesia. Regionally, the party also cooperates with another Silesian party, Silesians Together.

== History ==
The formation of the party was announced on 21 June 2017 by a member of the board of the Silesian Voivodeship, a councillor of the Silesian Voivodeship Assembly and vice-chairman of the Silesian Autonomy Movement, Henryk Mercik, and the president of the Upper Silesian Union, Grzegorz Franki. However, the latter withdrew from the initiative in November 2017, due to joining the Civic Platform. Henryk Mercik and Ilona Kanclerz became leaders of the ŚPR, with Janusz Dubiel as spokesperson. Waldemar Murek was temporarily appointed chairman of the main board. The chairman of RAŚ Jerzy Gorzelik also became a leading party activist. The application for party registration was submitted on 13 October 2017 and the court registered the party on 12 April 2018. Four days later, a programme convention of the ŚPR was held in Katowice. In May of the same year, the RAŚ councillors' club in the local assembly was transformed into the ŚPR club. On 12 June, the party's authorities were elected. A 15-member political council was set up, with Henryk Mercik as chairman and Joachim Otte as vice-chairman. It also included Dietmar Brehmer and Marian Makula, among others. The group's main executive board was elected from among the council members. Marek Nowara was elected chairman, Ilona Kanclerz was elected vice-chairman, Jerzy Gorzelik was elected general secretary, Rafał Adamus was elected treasurer and Waldemar Murek and Piotr Snaczke were the other members.

In the 2018 local elections, the ŚPR ran for the regional assemblies in the Silesian and Opole provinces. It gained 3.1% (losing, among others, to another regional party, Ślonzoki Razem, which won 3.23%) and 1.13%, respectively, which translated into 0.38% nationally (14th result among all committees). On the other hand, ŚPR won three seats on county councils (two in Rybnik and one in Bieruńsko-Lędziński) and 11 seats on municipal councils, including five in the municipality of Lyski (2nd result), where also a ŚPR candidate was elected mayor. Seven other party candidates ran unsuccessfully for mayor (four for mayor, one for mayor and two for alderman).

On 2 March 2019, the party convention took place, at which the new leaders of the party were elected. Rafal Adamus became chairman, Zenon Lis became vice-chairman, Piotr Snaczke became secretary and Łukasz Giertler became treasurer. Dietmar Brehmer was also elected to the board.

In the parliamentary elections of the same year, ŚPR activists (three for the Sejm and Henryk Mercik for the Senate) ran on behalf of the Civic Coalition, but failed to gain seats. ŚPR candidates for the Sejm, on the KO lists, received a total of 2452 votes (representing 0.01% nationally).

On 18 February 2021, new party authorities were elected. After Rafał Adamus stepped down as chairman, his successor was Henryk Mercik. The then secretary Roman Kubica was replaced by Tomasz Skowron. In April 2022, Secretary Tomasz Skowron and Vice-chair Marta Bainka were dismissed. Ilona Kanclerz became the new secretary, Marek Bromboszcz the vice-chairman and Marek Polok the treasurer.

As a result of Henryk Mercik's support for Marek Wesoły, MP of the Law and Justice party, in the early elections for the mayor of Ruda Śląska, in August 2022 the chairman of the RAŚ Jerzy Gorzelik announced his departure from the party, and on 18 October of the same year Henryk Mercik was dismissed from the position of chairman of the ŚPR. Marek Bromboszcz then became acting chairman. A part of the party led by Henryk Mercik did not recognise this decision, and a few days later voted to dismiss Marek Bromboszcz and Ilona Kanclerz from the ŚPR board and to self-dissolve the party. Formally, however, Ryszard Ucher became the party chairman, who was registered by the District Court in Warsaw. On 11 January 2023, this court deregistered ŚPR due to the party's late submission of its 2019 financial report. However, in a statement from 18 February 2023, the party authorities declared that the party did not decide to dissolve and the decision of the court to deregister it has been appealed to the court of appeals in Warsaw.

On 15th of April 2023, the party held a summit in Żory, where Ilona Kanclerz was elected as the new party leader, with the party's board and other positions being replaced as well. The decision to remove the party from the register of political parties was revoked. Regional newspapers spoke of the "rebirth" of the party, and the new leadership of the Silesian Regional Party held a meeting with Silesians Together, where both parties decided to form a coalition for the next election.

In 2023, the party was deregistered, and was re-registered in December 2024, under the name "Regionalists". Ilona Kanclerz remained the party's leader and its headquarters are in Katowice.

== Ideology ==
The main political aim of the party is to "transform the Polish state into a regional state, with a significant proportion of legislative and financial powers transferred to regional authorities". The party offers an expansive program of investment called Śródmieście+ that aims at renovating Silesian cities, extensive urban greening and other environmental measures, while also decentralising and extending social welfare in Silesia. The SPR also wants to reorganise and decentralise the state bureaucracy in Poland, relocating most of the state institutions away from Warsaw. The party's main objectives are listed as "broadening and strengthening self-government by transferring certain legislative powers to the regions and decentralizing financing; creating optimal conditions for preserving and protecting the identity of Silesians; protection of Silesian cultural heritage; improving the quality of Silesian life; and raising the level of education in the region".

The Silesian Regional Party proposes a catalogue of social programs that would be financed by gradual decentralization of the Polish state, where regional governments would be given at least 3% of their region's tax revenue. According to the party, this revenue should then be spend on education and healthcare, with the focus on extending the accessibility of these institutions in the poorest areas. Other economical goals of the party is the development of rail transport, environmental programs to curb smog, urban greening of Silesian cities, and the revitalisation of brownfield lands (degrades areas).

The party is placed left of centre on the political spectrum; Dziennik Zachodni noted the party's connection to feminism and the fact that the party leader, Ilona Kanclerz, attended an academy of gender studies. The party's focus on secularism and cultural innovation was also noted. In the 2019 European Parliament election in Poland, the party endorsed Łukasz Kohut, who was a member of the New Left coalition at the time.

=== Program ===
During the party's convention held on 16 April 2018 in Katowice, the main goals of the party were presented. The party's mission includes four issues: "self-government", "identity", "innovation" and "dialogue". The party called for regional self-governments to be given extensive powers for their regions, arguing that the national government in Warsaw was too centralized holds too much power. The party also advocates for "codifying" the Silesian language by having it replace Polish as the official and administrative language in Silesia. The SPR proposed a programme to increase funds of local governments, and redistribute tax revenues to local and regional governments. The headquarters of central governmental institutions - ministries - were als to be decentralised and moved to other regions. In addition, the party also stressed the need for environmental initiatives, especially policies that would reduce environmental pollution, especially smog, in Silesia. Despite the heavy reliance of the Silesian economy on coal, the party opposes expanding coal extraction and campaigned against specific coal mines such as one in Imielin; SPR believes that the environmental damage done by current coal mining levels is too great, and warns of dire consequences for Silesia such as the destruction of wildlife, air pollution and pinges. In its statement from 2019 regarding the Imielin coal mine, the party wrote:

The Silesian Regional Party does not agree with the further exploitation of Silesian lands and the extraction of coal from beneath areas where there has been no mining activity to date. Too many towns and cities in Silesia have been ruined by decades of predatory coal mining from beneath their surfaces. Bytom is the most glaring example of this. Meanwhile, the Polish state, which owns the vast majority of the mining facilities in Silesia, not only does not take sufficient care of already degraded areas, but, by intensifying mining activities in new areas, is directly contributing to the environmental and social disaster of these areas in the future.

The move away from coal as an energy resource should be implemented as quickly as possible. In this way, it will be possible to protect miners and other industries linked to mining from the negative effects of such a transition. Nevertheless, there has not been, and cannot be, any consent to the opening of new mining facilities which, in a few decades' time, could lead to the degradation of the areas where they will operate.

Party objectives include the following declarations:

- expanding and strengthening local governments by transferring most of the powers of the legislative powers to the regions and the decentralisation of public finances;
- developing conditions for the preservation and development of the identity of the inhabitants in the region, preservation of the cultural heritage of the Silesian lands, including linguistic diversity;
- improving of the quality of life of the region's inhabitants, especially through the development of public transport public transport, rational spatial development, environmental and green policies, comprehensive revitalisation of city centres and decaying towns and their districts;
- improving education in the region by directing education towards the development of independent critical and innovative thinking and supporting regional education;
- promoting and protecting freedoms, human rights and civil liberties by promoting openness and dialogue.

=== Regionalism ===
In April 2023, the leader of the party at that time, Ilona Kanclerz, named "decentralisation" as the main focus of the party. The party wants to decentralise Poland and empower local government along the ideals of regionalism and localism, but it also wishes to decentralise the administrative organisation of Silesia itself; the party argues against the current concentration of all governmental institutions of Silesia in Katowice, and advocates for an even distribution of administrative forces in the region instead. The SPR believes that Silesia itself, either as an autonomous or sovereign state, also should not be unitary, but rather focus on the local governments and protecting its local dialects. The party demands the Polish government to recognise the Silesian language as a regional language, and to recognise Silesians as an ethnic minority. In April 2023, the SPR criticised Polish government for its policies of cultural assimilation, arguing that the national government pressures Silesians to use Polish language only and forces Silesian to be reduced to a household language.

=== Foreign policy ===
SPR is also strongly pro-European and desires closer ties to the European Union. The party condemns Brexit and argues that European states should not let "xenophobia and intolerance against foreigners" stay in the way of further cooperation between the nations of Europe. SPR condemns Euroscepticism and expressed its support for the Welsh and Scottish independence movements. In 2017, the party supported the Catalan declaration of independence and expressed its admiration for Carles Puigdemont. SPR expressed solidarity with the Catalan independence movement and wrote that the Catalan struggle for independence in many ways mirrors the Silesian autonomy aspirations. When Poland's Constitutional Tribunal ruled that some provisions of the EU treaties and some EU court rulings go against Poland's highest law on 7 October 2021, SPR strongly condemned this decision. The party argued that by questioning the primacy of European law, the Law and Justice party under Prime Minister Mateusz Morawiecki threatens the future of Poland and Silesia in the European Union. SPR accused the Polish government of dooming Silesia to "marginalisation and economic stagnation", as the tribunal's decision was instrumental in denying Poland the EU economic recovery package from the EU's Next Generation Programme. SPR argued that only a strong European community could provide Silesia with "an exit from infrastructural, economic and environmental decline", and will allow Silesians to preserve their cultural heritage.

== Leadership ==
- Marek Nowara - (12 June 2018 - 2 March 2019)
- Rafał Adamus - (2 March 2019 - 18 February 2021)
- Henryk Mercik - (18 February 2021 - 18 October 2022)
- Marek Bromboszcz - (October 2022)
- Ryszard Ucher - (October 2022 - 15 April 2023)
- Ilona Kanclerz - (since 15 April 2023)

== Election results ==
=== European Parliament ===
Election	Leader	Votes	%	Seats	+/–	EP Group
2024	Ilona Kanclerz	813,238	6.91 (#4)	0 / 53	New	–
2024	As part of the Third Way coalition, that won 3 seats in total.					

=== Silesian Voivodeship Assembly ===
Election	Votes			Seats	
Election	Number	%	+/−	Number	+/−
2018	54 092	3,10 (8.)	–	0 / 45	–

=== Opole Voivodeship Assembly ===
Election	Votes			Seats	
Election	Number	%	+/−	Number	+/−
2018	4034	1,13 (9.)	–	0 / 30	–

== See also ==
- Silesian Autonomy Movement
- Union of Upper Silesians
- Silesian People's Party
- German Minority (political party)
- Silesians Together
