= Michał Grażyński =

Polish politician, soldier, Scouting activist

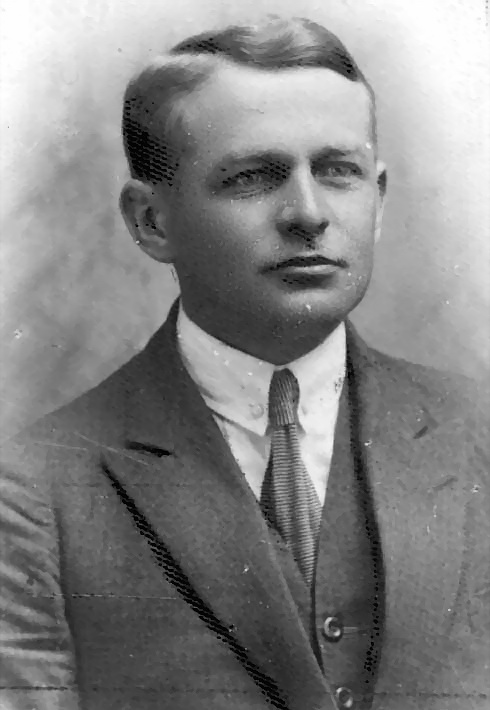

Voivode of Silesian Voivodeship
- In office 6 September 1926 – 5 September 1939
- Preceded by: Mieczysław Bilski
- Succeeded by: Abolished (German occupation)

Minister of Propaganda
- In office 2 September 1939 – 30 October 1939
- Preceded by: Position created
- Succeeded by: Abolished (German occupation)

Personal details
- Born: 27 October 1871 Gdów, Galicia, Austria-Hungary
- Died: 10 December 1965 (aged 94) London, United Kingdom
- Cause of death: Car accident
- Resting place: Putney Vale Cemetery
- Party: Sanation
- Education: Jagiellonian University
- Awards: Virtuti Militari, Order of Polonia Restituta, Cross of Independence, Cross of Valour, Cross of Merit, Order of the Three Stars, Virtuti Militari

Michał Grażyński (born Michał Tadeusz Kurzydło; 12 May 1890 – 10 December 1965) was a Polish military leader and activist. He was doctor of philosophy and law, voivode of the Silesian Voivodeship, Scouting activist and president of Związek Harcerstwa Polskiego.

== Biography ==
He was born to a teacher's family in Gdów in Austrian-ruled Polish Galicia. In 1897, his family changed their surname from Kurzydło to Grażyński. He attended Gimnazjum Św. Anny (St.Anna-Gymnasium) in Kraków and Jagiellonian University, where he graduated in 1913, receiving the degree of Doctor of Philosophy for a dissertation about the history of the Polish monetary system. In 1914 he started work as teacher in Stanisławów (now Ivano-Frankivsk, Ukraine), but after the 1st World War broke out he was mobilized into the Austro-Hungarian Army in the rank of Sub-Lieutenant, served on the Eastern Front and was wounded. In 1918, following Poland's independence he joined the Polish Army and served in the intelligence and propaganda branch with the rank of Lieutenant. In 1919 during the Polish-Czechoslovak border dispute he was involved in preparations for a plebiscite in Spisz (Spiš) and Orawa (Orava). In 1920 Grażyński was engaged in preparations for a plebiscite in Upper Silesia and the Silesian Uprising. He served under the nom de guerre "Borelowski" in the underground staff of Dowództwo Ochrony Plebiscytu (Plebiscite Protection Command), moving quickly to the staff of the Polish Military Organisation of Upper Silesia (Polska Organizacja Wojskowa, POW). He took part in the Third Silesian Uprising as Chief of Staff of Grupa "Wschód" (Combat Group "East"). After the uprising he retired from military service with the rank of Captain.

Between 1921 and 1926 Grażyński worked in state administration, studied law at the Jagiellonian University and graduated with the degree of Doctor of Law. During this time he also joined the "Zet" association, an elite political society with historical roots in the National League (Narodowa Demokracja), but after 1914 linked rather with Józef Piłsudski and future Sanacja.

In 1926, when Piłsudski came to power (by a coup d'état of a part of the Polish army), Grażyński was appointed voivode of the Silesian Voivodeship. He served in this post till 1939. He was awarded the Latvian Order of the Three Stars 1st Class on 15 November 1935.

Grażyński was one of the prominent leaders of the Związek Naprawy Rzeczypospolitej (Union for Improvement of the Republic), which was the left wing of Sanacja. From 1930 to 1939 Grażyński was also President of Związek Harcerstwa Polskiego. He was awarded an honorary highest scout rank Honorowy Harcerz Rzeczypospolitej (Honorary Scout of the Republic), but never had been a Scoutmaster.

In 1939 Grażyński fled to exile. Between 1943 and 1946 he served in the Polish Army and was promoted to the ranks of Major and Lieutenant-Colonel. From 1946 until 1960 he was President of Związek Harcerstwa Polskiego poza granicami Kraju (Polish Scouting Association in Exile). He died in London in 1965 of a traffic accident and buried at the Putney Vale Cemetery.
