= Silesian Treasury =

Silesian Treasury (pl: Skarb Śląski) - name of the treasury of the Silesian Voivodeship.

== General information ==
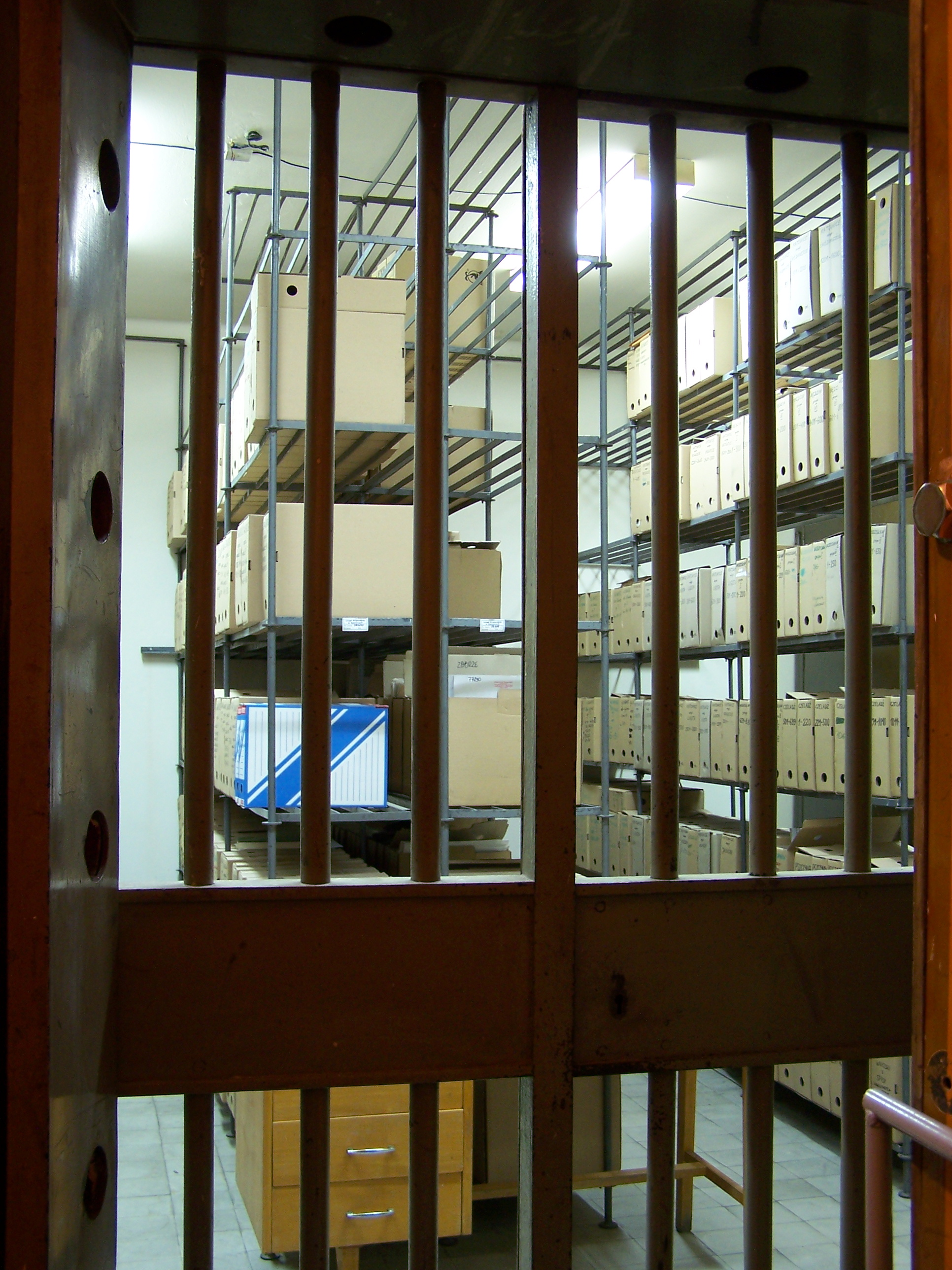
The vault of the National Treasury of Silesia, nowadays an archive

The Silesian Treasury consisted of about 1 ton of gold in 1939. It was managed by the Silesian Parliament. The voivodeship produced about 46% Polish GDP; 90% of the local income remained in the autonomous region, while the remaining 10% used to become part of the state budget.

== Vault ==
A vault containing the Treasury of Silesia was placed in the basements of the building of the Silesian Parliament. At the outbreak of the second world war, there was about a ton of gold in staffs kept inside. The walls of the vault were thicker than in the rest of the building, they were about 1,5 metre thick, and so were the ceilings. The vault contains a mechanism which, if a stranger attempted to open the manhole, sinks the treasure in a pool below. The vault serves today as a place where archive documents are being formed.

== See also ==
- Silesian Parliament
