= Jerzy Gorzelik =

Polish politician

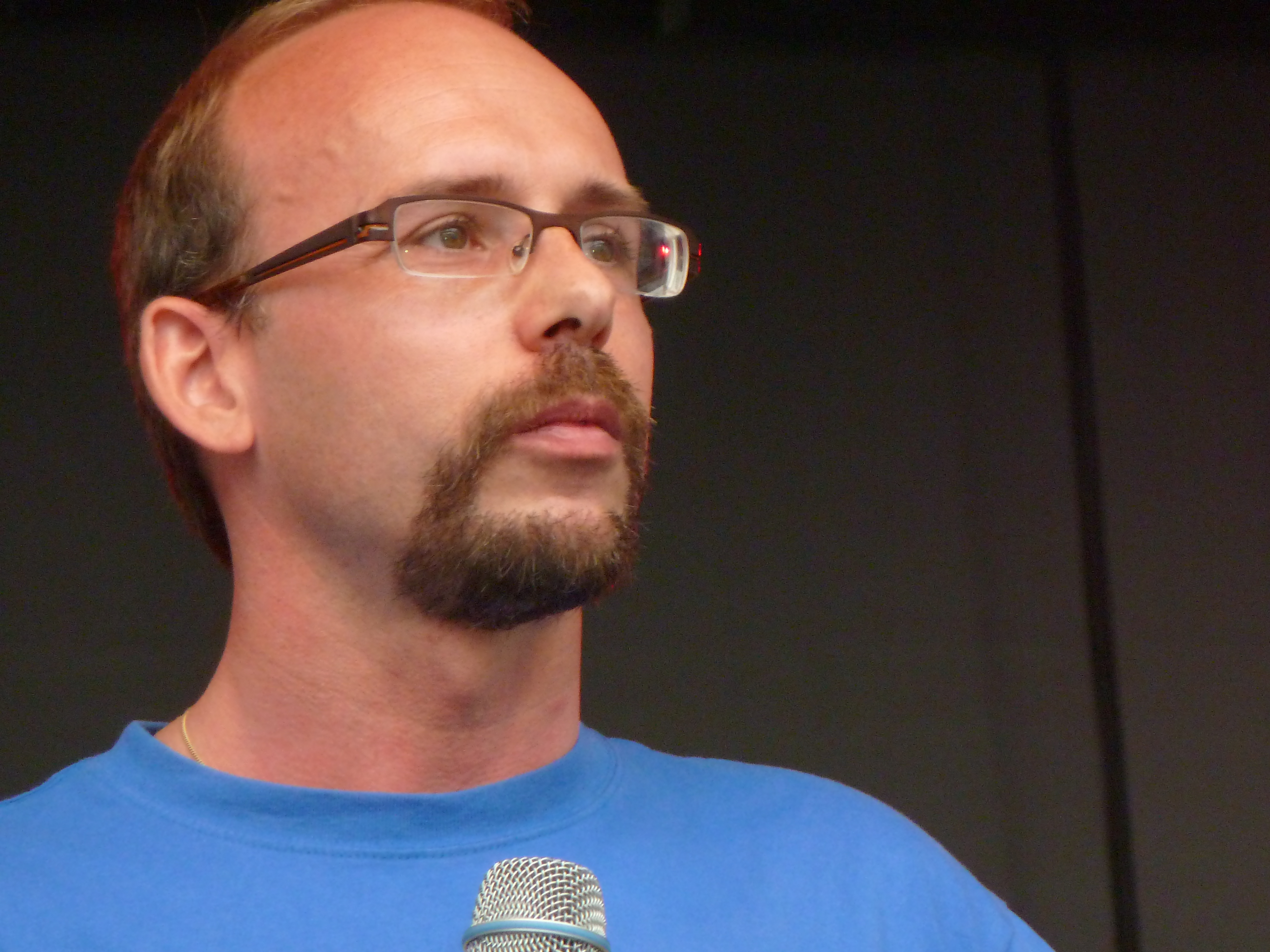
- Gorzelik during a demonstration for autonomy, 2011
- Born: Jerzy Zdzisław Gorzelik; October 25, 1971 (age 54); Zabrze, Katowice Voivodeship, Polish People's Republic
- Education: University of Silesia in Katowice
- Political party: RAŚ
- Awards: (2025)
- Website: Jerzy Gorzelik publications on Academia.edu

Jerzy Zdzisław Gorzelik (szl: Jorg Gorzelik, born 25 October 1971, in Zabrze) is a Silesian politician and an art historian. He is the president of the Silesian Autonomy Movement and an advocate for decentralization of the Polish administrative structure.

Gorzelik earned his doctorate in art history from the University of Silesia in Katowice. His academic work focuses on the relationship between art and group identities, including confessional, national, and regional aspects.
