= Silesian Voivodeship (1920–1939) =

Former voivodeship of Poland

Silesian Voivodeship Województwo Śląskie
- Voivodeship of Poland
- 1920–1939
- Coat of arms

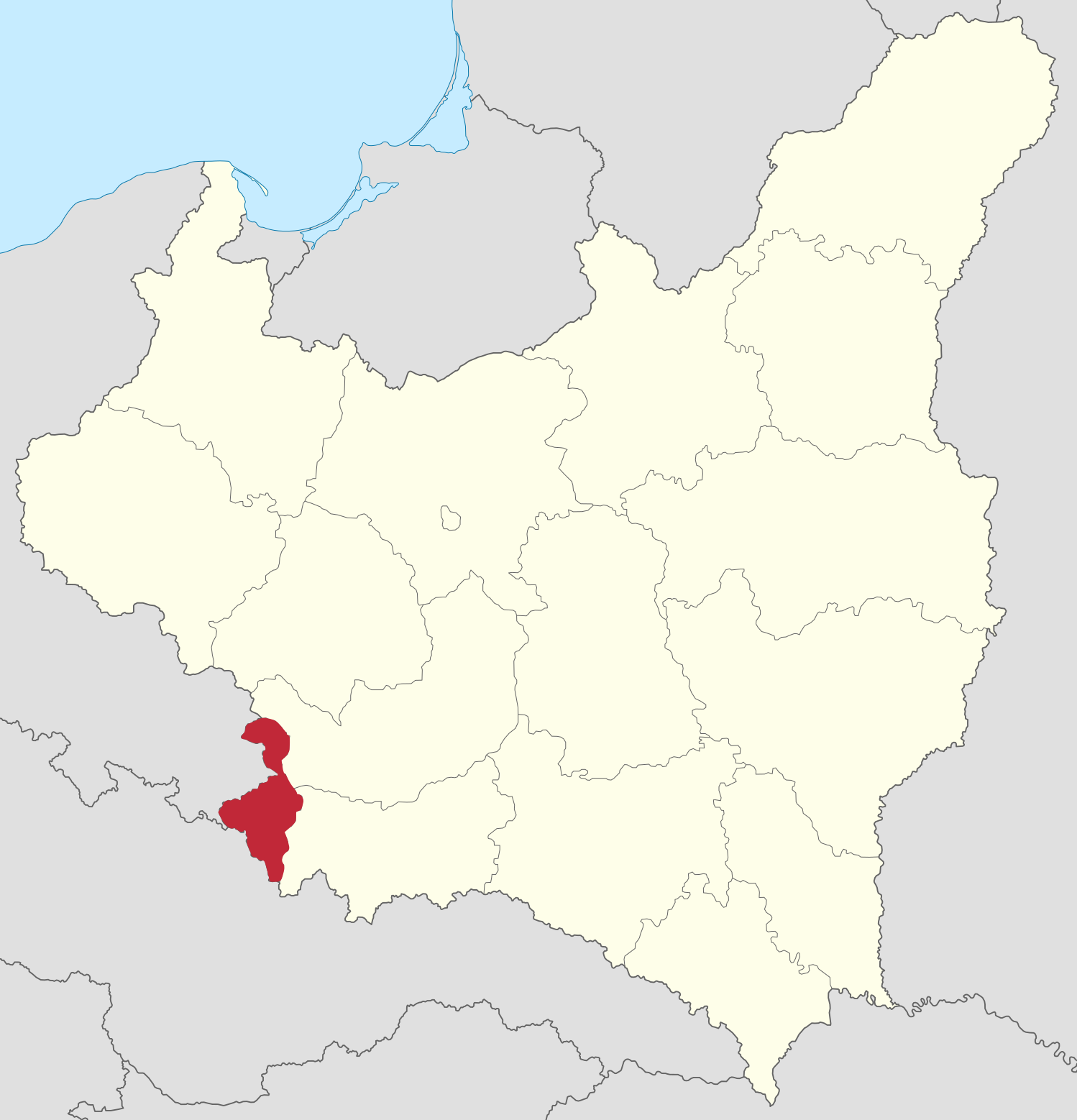
- Location of the Silesian Voivodeship within Poland (1938).
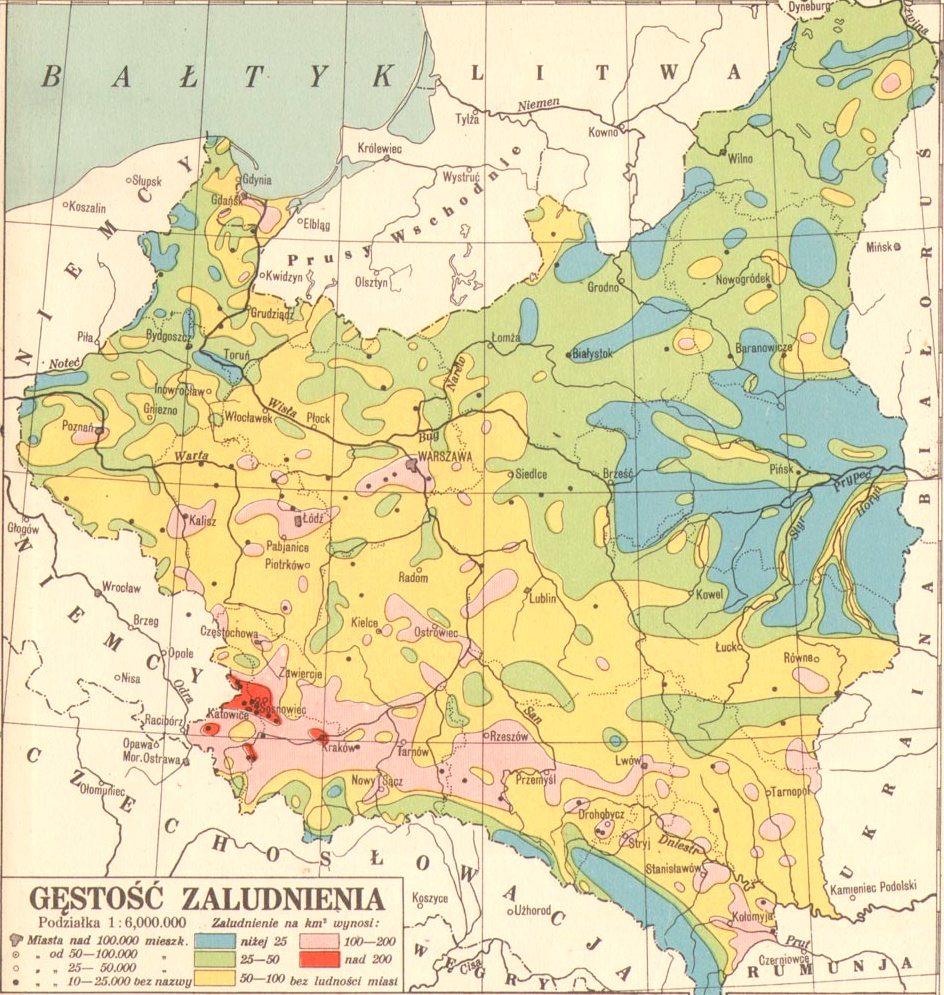
- Poland, population density, 1931
- Capital: Katowice
- Area
  - 1921: 5,100 km^{2} (2,000 sq mi)
- Population
  - 1921: 1,125,528
  - 1931: 1,295,027
  - 1939: 1,533,500
- Government
  - Type: Autonomous voivodeship
- Voivodes
  - June-Dec 1922: Józef Rymer
  - 1926-1939: Michał Grażyński
- Legislature: Silesian Parliament
- Historical era: Interwar period
  - Established: 15 July 1920
  - Annexed by Germany: 8 October 1939
- Political subdivisions: See list
Preceded by	Succeeded by
Province of Upper Silesia; Austrian Silesia	Province of Upper Silesia
- Today part of: Poland

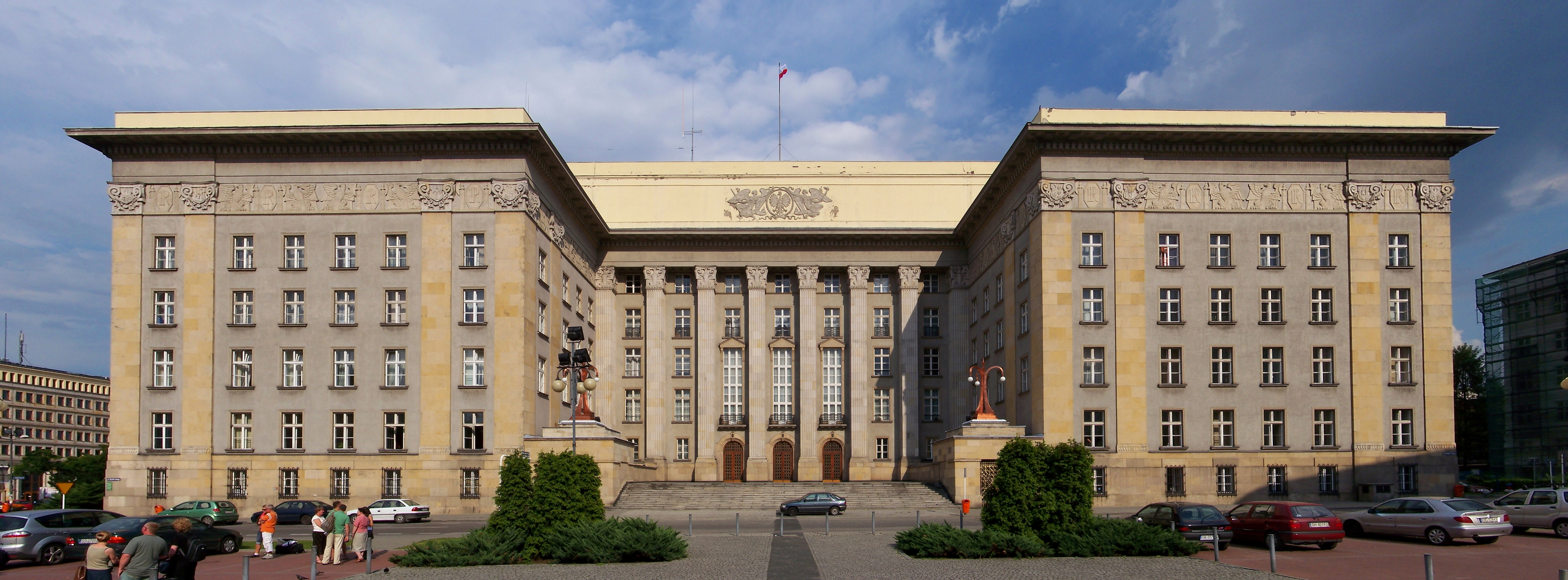
Katowice, the building of the Silesian Parliament, today the Provincial Office

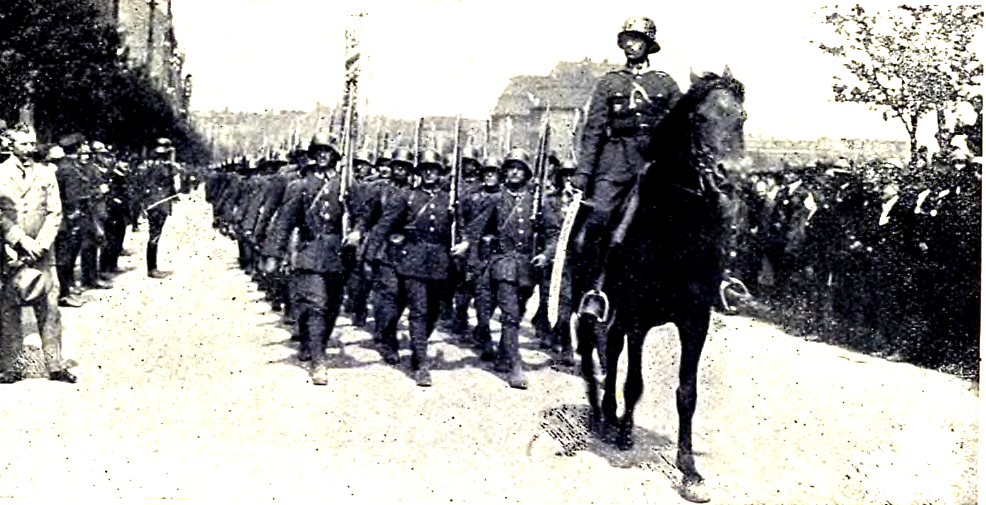
Polish army enters Katowice in 1922

The Silesian Voivodeship (Polish: województwo śląskie; German: Woiwodschaft Schlesien) was an autonomous province (voivodeship) of the Second Polish Republic. The bulk of its territory had formerly belonged to the German/Prussian Province of Silesia and became part of the newly reborn Poland as a result of the 1921 Upper Silesia plebiscite, the Geneva Conventions, three Upper Silesian Uprisings, and the eventual partition of Upper Silesia between Poland, Germany and Czechoslovakia. The remainder had been the easternmost portion of Austrian Silesia (see Cieszyn Silesia) which was partitioned between Poland and Czechoslovakia following the collapse of Austria-Hungary, the Polish–Czechoslovak War and the Spa Conference of 1920. The capital of the voivodeship was Katowice.

The voivodeship was dissolved on 8 October 1939 following the German invasion of Poland, and its territory was incorporated into the German Province of Silesia. After the defeat of Nazi Germany in World War II, its territory was incorporated into a new, larger Silesian Voivodeship which existed until 1950.

== General description ==
The Silesian Voivodeship was one of the richest and best developed provinces of inter-war Poland. It owed its wealth to rich deposits of coal, which resulted in the construction of numerous coal mines and steelworks. For this reason, this Voivodeship was crucial to Polish armaments production. However, its location on the border with Germany made it vulnerable. In the mid-1930s, the Polish government decided to move some sectors of heavy industry to the nation's heartland, creating the Central Industrial Region. Due to efficient agricultural practices, the Silesian Voivodeship also was a major producer of food, in spite of its small size.

According to the 1931 Polish census, 92.3% of the population stated Polish as their mother tongue. Germans made up 7% and Jews only 1.5%. Poles lived mainly in the villages (95.6% of the population there), while Germans and Jews preferred cities (12.9% of Polish Upper Silesian cities' population was German, especially Bielsko and Katowice).

Population density was the highest in the country at 299 persons per 1 km^{2}. On 1 January 1937, forested areas made up 27.9% of the province. Rail density was the highest in the country at 18.5 km per 100 km^{2}. In 1931, the illiteracy rate was the lowest in the country at 1.5% of the population.

== History ==
After the First World War a dispute arose about the future of Upper Silesia. This part of the Silesia region was the least affected by centuries of Germanisation. The population was predominantly Slavic, especially in rural areas, although over the years the percentage of the German population increased and in many cities Germans constituted the majority. Many of Slavic people considered themselves Poles (majority), and some Czechs (minority). The rest did not feel any strong connections to either of those nations; according to Wojciech Korfanty's estimations, this last group represented up to a quarter of the total whole population of the region.

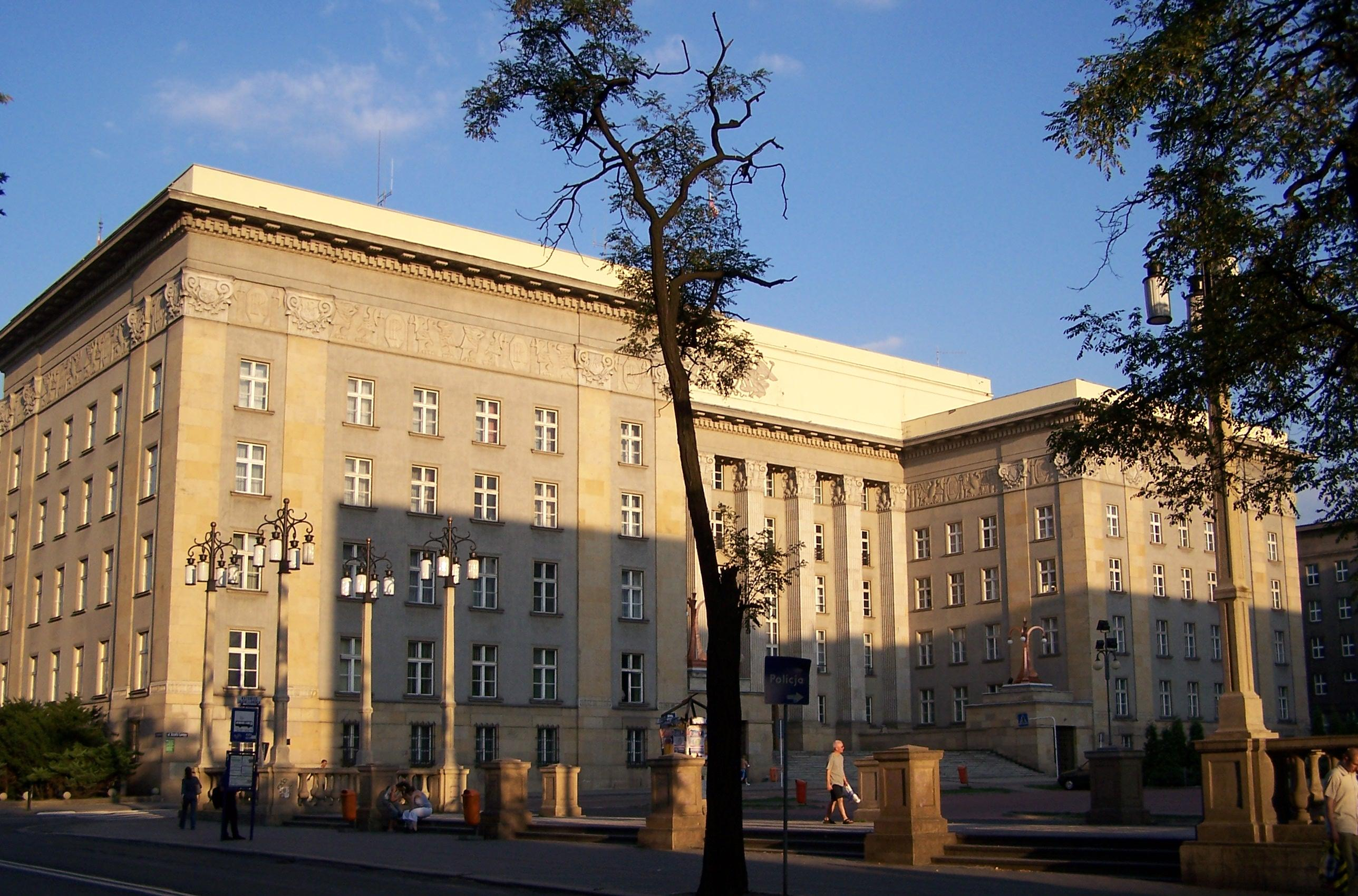
Silesian Parliament building in Katowice as it looks today

The Treaty of Versailles resolved that a plebiscite be conducted so that the local population could decide whether Upper Silesia should be assigned to Poland or to Germany. Before the plebiscite took place, two Silesian Uprisings supporting the Polish option had broken out. A third uprising occurred after the plebiscite.

Based on the results of the plebiscite, which was held on 20 March 1921, Upper Silesia was divided between Poland and Germany. The Polish part was incorporated as the Silesian Voivodeship. After the referendum of 1921, the German-Polish Accord on East Silesia (Geneva Convention) was concluded on 15 May 1922 and dealt with the constitutional and legal future of Upper Silesia, as part of it had become Polish territory.

The voivodeship was one of the most economically-developed parts of Poland. It had been granted autonomous status by an Act of the Polish Sejm dated 15 July 1920. That status was secure until the May Coup in 1926, which started various attempts to limit it in favour of a strong and centralised state.

After the German invasion of Poland, the voivodeship was dissolved on 8 October 1939, and its territory was incorporated into the German Province of Upper Silesia. The territory returned to Polish possession at the end of the war, and the 1920 act giving autonomous powers to the Silesian Voivodeship was formally repealed by a law of 6 May 1945. An enlarged Silesian Voivodeship (unofficially called Silesia-Dąbrowa Voivodeship, województwo śląsko-dąbrowskie) continued in existence until 1950, when it was divided into Katowice Voivodeship and Opole Voivodeship. (For details, see Administrative division of the People's Republic of Poland.)

== Politics ==
The voivodeship possessed wide autonomy in domestic matters excluding foreign and military policy. It had its own Silesian Parliament with 48 MPs (24 since 1935) elected in democratic elections. Legislation, however, had to be consistent with the Polish constitution. The voivodeship also had its own national treasury - the Silesian Treasury (Polish: Skarb Śląski). Only around 10% of taxes were transferred to Polish national treasury. The head of the administration was headed by a voivode appointed by the president of Poland to act as a representative of the central government.

== Administrative divisions ==
=== Counties (powiaty) ===
In mid-1939, in the wake of invasion, the population of the voivodeship was 1,533,500 (together with Trans-Olza, annexed in October 1938. Its total area was 5,122 square kilometres (1,978 sq mi). The voivodeship was divided into the following counties; with largest cities based on the 1931 population census).

Powiat	Population	Area
Katowice county (powiat katowicki)	357,300	213 km^{2}
Rybnik county (powiat rybnicki)	212,900	890 km^{2}
Cieszyn county (powiat cieszyński)	176,600	1 305 km^{2}
Pszczyna county (powiat pszczyński)	151,500	1 046 km^{2}
Frysztat County (powiat frysztacki)	143,000	262 km^{2}
City of Chorzów	128,900	32 km^{2}
City of Katowice	126,200	42 km^{2}
Tarnowskie Góry county (powiat tarnogórski)	107 000	268 km^{2}
Bielsko county (powiat bielski)	59,500	339 km^{2}
Lubliniec county (powiat lubliniecki)	45,200	715 km^{2}
City of Bielsko	25,400	10 km^{2}

Cities	Population
Chorzów^{a}	128,900
Katowice	126,200
Siemianowice Śląskie	37,800
Cieszyn	28,000
Bielsko	25,400
Rybnik	23 000
Mysłowice	22,700
Karwina	22,300
Tarnowskie Góry	15,500
Mikołów	11,900
Bogumin	10,800
Orłowa	10,000

a. In 1934, the town of Królewska Huta, the village of Maciejkowice, the commune of Nowe Hajduki and the village of Chorzów Stary were merged, creating the city of Chorzów. Additionally, on 1 April 1939, the commune of Wielkie Hajduki also became incorporated into the city of Chorzów.

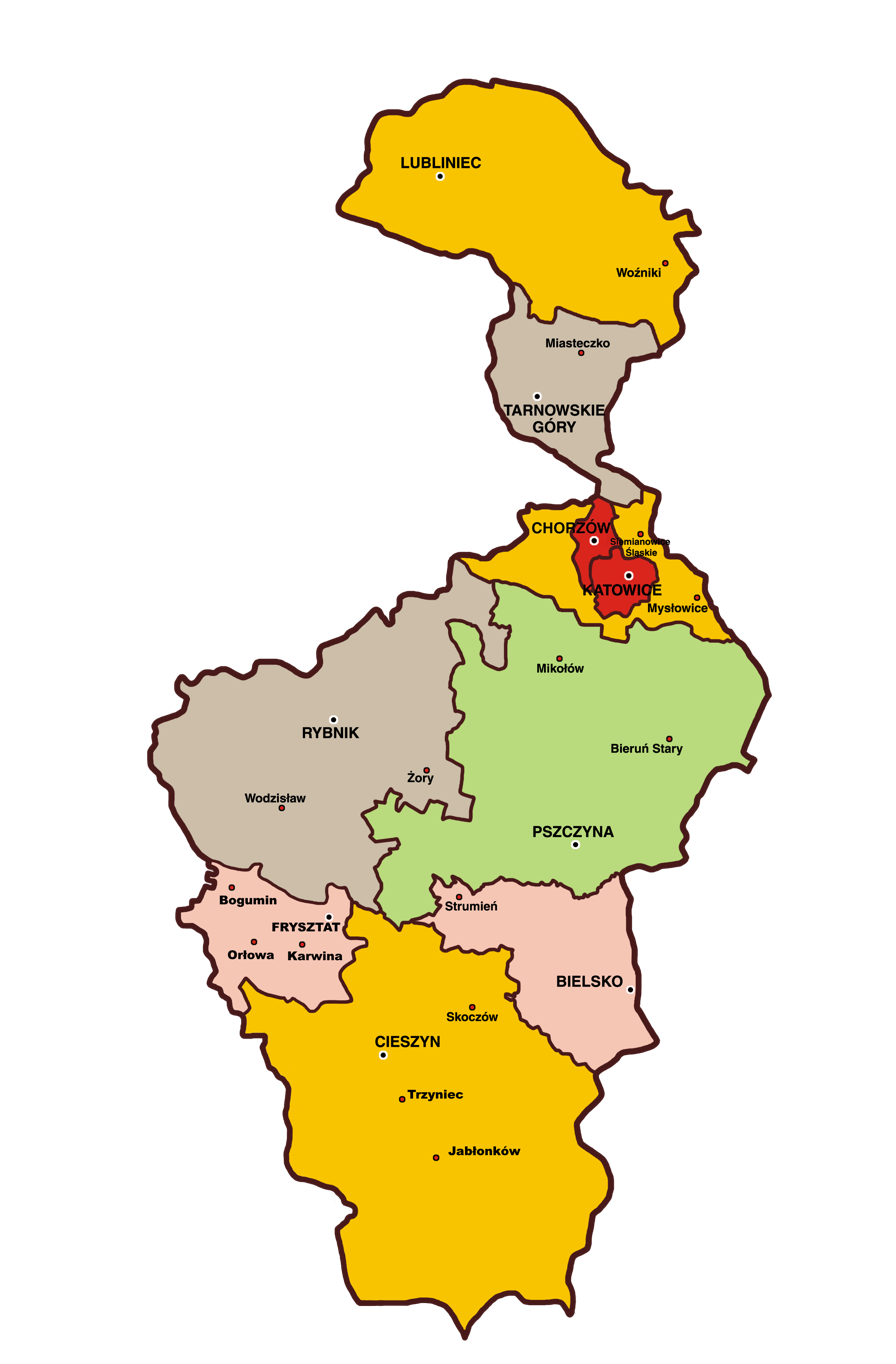
Cities and counties of the voivodeship's administrative division

== Ethnic and religious structure ==
Linguistic (mother tongue) and religious structure of Silesian Voivodeship according to the 1931 census
County	Pop.	Polish	%	Yiddish & Hebrew	%	German	%	Other language %	Roman Catholic	%	Jewish	%	Protestant	%	Other religion %
Bielsko City	22332	9683	43.4%	2275	10.2%	10220	45.8%	0.7%	12645	56.6%	4430	19.8%	5108	22.9%	0.7%
Bielsko County	62584	52895	84.5%	380	0.6%	9059	14.5%	0.4%	47995	76.7%	1253	2.0%	12917	20.6%	0.7%
Chorzów City	101977	88753	87.0%	1148	1.1%	11929	11.7%	0.1%	94010	92.2%	2811	2.8%	4870	4.8%	0.3%
Cieszyn	81087	77717	95.8%	529	0.7%	2531	3.1%	0.4%	52004	64.1%	1940	2.4%	26496	32.7%	0.8%
Katowice City	126058	107040	84.9%	1577	1.3%	16936	13.4%	0.4%	113209	89.8%	5716	4.5%	6414	5.1%	0.6%
Mysłowice City	22696	20372	89.8%	152	0.7%	2126	9.4%	0.2%	21447	94.5%	463	2.0%	703	3.1%	0.4%
Siemianowice Śląskie City	37790	34934	92.4%	53	0.1%	2780	7.4%	0.1%	35838	94.8%	240	0.6%	1644	4.4%	0.2%
Katowice Countryside	154659	147169	95.2%	81	0.1%	7265	4.7%	0.1%	151224	97.8%	421	0.3%	2708	1.8%	0.2%
Lubliniec	45232	44196	97.7%	29	0.1%	920	2.0%	0.2%	44609	98.6%	144	0.3%	405	0.9%	0.2%
Pszczyna	162015	156750	96.8%	74	0.0%	5037	3.1%	0.1%	152958	94.4%	348	0.2%	8519	5.3%	0.1%
Rybnik	212829	207866	97.7%	65	0.0%	4584	2.2%	0.1%	208907	98.2%	388	0.2%	3193	1.5%	0.2%
Świętochłowice	201176	189074	94.0%	37	0.0%	11948	5.9%	0.1%	196978	97.9%	424	0.2%	3394	1.7%	0.2%
Tarnowskie Góry	64592	59186	91.6%	67	0.1%	5210	8.1%	0.2%	63212	97.9%	360	0.6%	898	1.4%	0.2%
Total	1295027	1195635	92.3%	6467	0.5%	90545	7.0%	0.2%	1195036	92.3%	18938	1.5%	77269	6.0%	0.3%

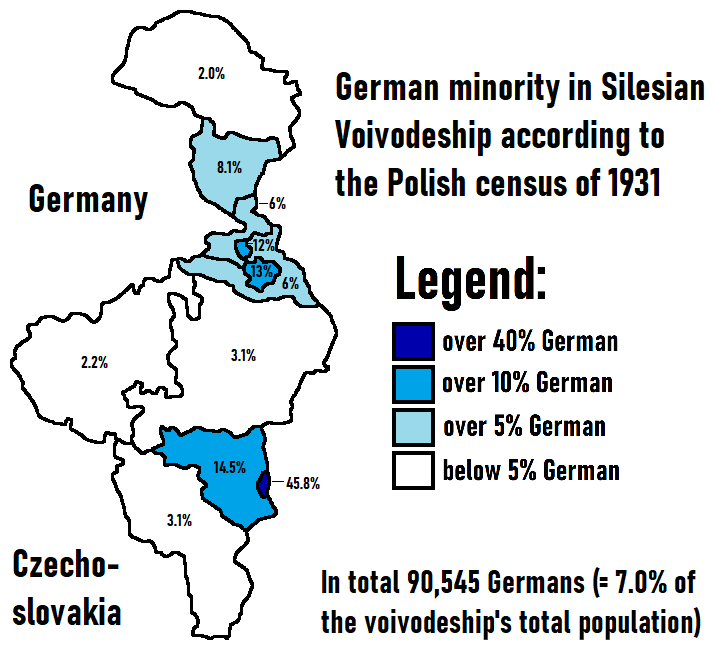
German minority in Polish Silesian Voivodeship in 1931

== Voivodes ==
- Józef Rymer 16 June 1922 – 5 December 1922
- Zygmunt Żurawski 15 December 1922 – 1 February 1923 (acting)
- Antoni Schultis 1 February 1923 – 3 March 1924
- Tadeusz Koncki 15 October 1923 – 2 May 1924 (acting until 3 March 1924)
- Mieczysław Bilski 6 May 1924 – 3 September 1926
- Michał Grażyński 6 September 1926 – 5 September 1939

== See also ==
- State country
