= 1930 =

1930 in various calendars
- Gregorian calendar: 1930; MCMXXX
- Ab urbe condita: 2683
- Armenian calendar: 1379; ԹՎ ՌՅՀԹ
- Assyrian calendar: 6680
- Baháʼí calendar: 86–87
- Balinese saka calendar: 1851–1852
- Bengali calendar: 1336–1337
- Berber calendar: 2880
- British Regnal year: 20 Geo. 5 – 21 Geo. 5
- Buddhist calendar: 2474
- Burmese calendar: 1292
- Byzantine calendar: 7438–7439
- Chinese calendar: 己巳年 (Earth Snake); 4627 or 4420 — to — 庚午年 (Metal Horse); 4628 or 4421
- Coptic calendar: 1646–1647
- Discordian calendar: 3096
- Ethiopian calendar: 1922–1923
- Hebrew calendar: 5690–5691
- Hindu calendars
- Vikram Samvat: 1986–1987
- Shaka Samvat: 1851–1852
- Kali Yuga: 5030–5031
- Holocene calendar: 11930
- Igbo calendar: 930–931
- Iranian calendar: 1308–1309
- Islamic calendar: 1348–1349
- Japanese calendar: Shōwa 5 (昭和５年)
- Javanese calendar: 1860–1861
- Juche calendar: 19
- Julian calendar: Gregorian minus 13 days
- Korean calendar: 4263
- Minguo calendar: ROC 19 民國19年
- Nanakshahi calendar: 462
- Thai solar calendar: 2472–2473
- Tibetan calendar: ས་མོ་སྦྲུལ་ལོ་ (female Earth-Snake); 2056 or 1675 or 903 — to — ལྕགས་ཕོ་རྟ་ལོ་ (male Iron-Horse); 2057 or 1676 or 904

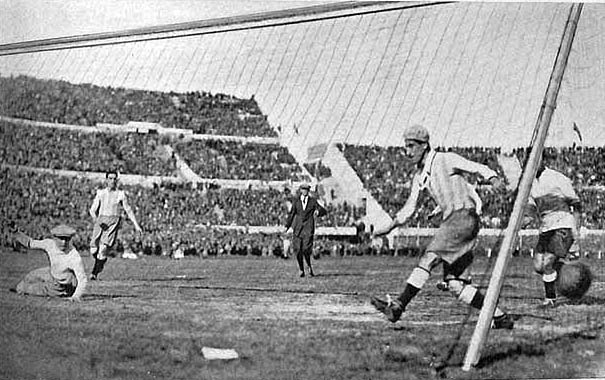
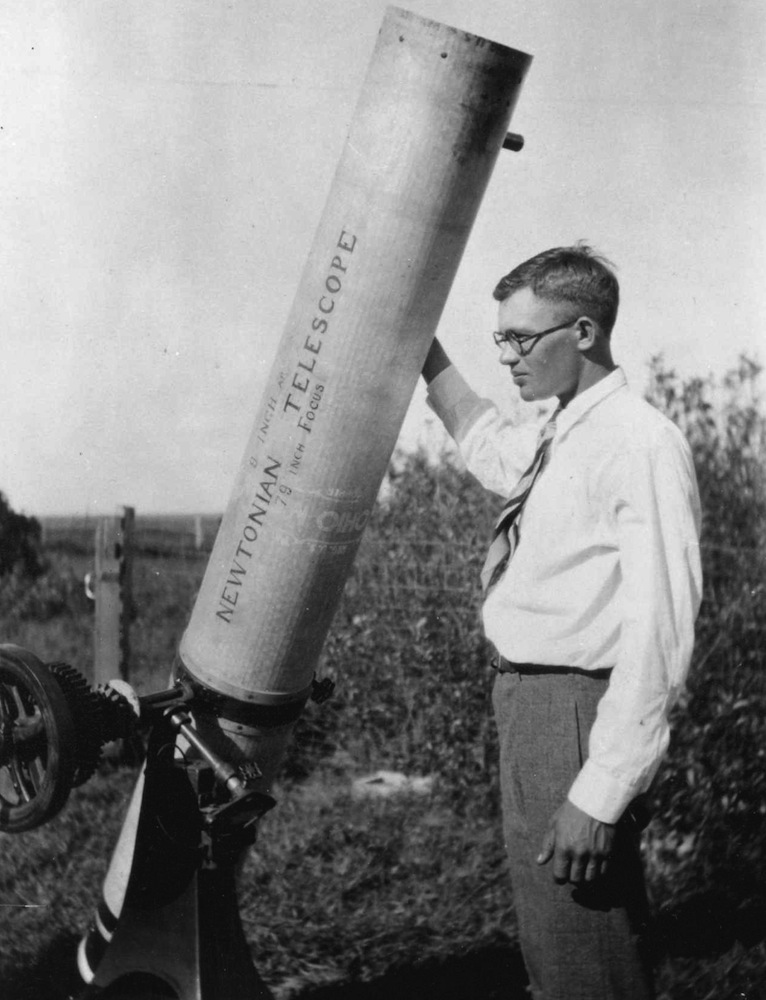
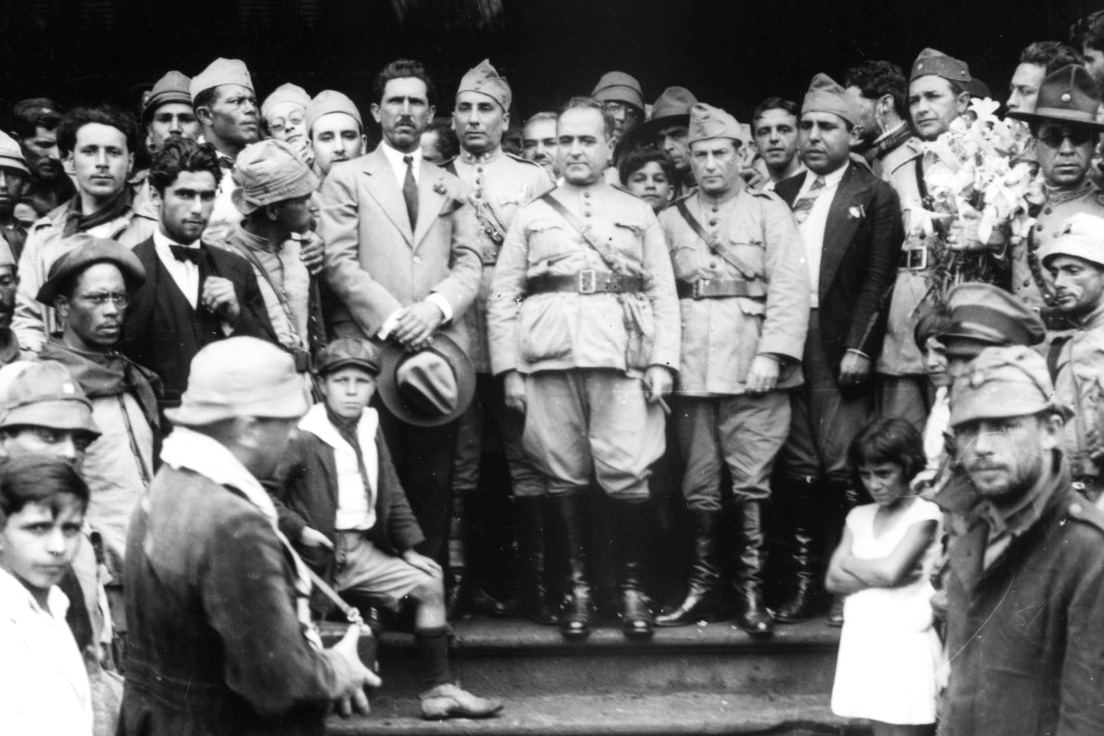
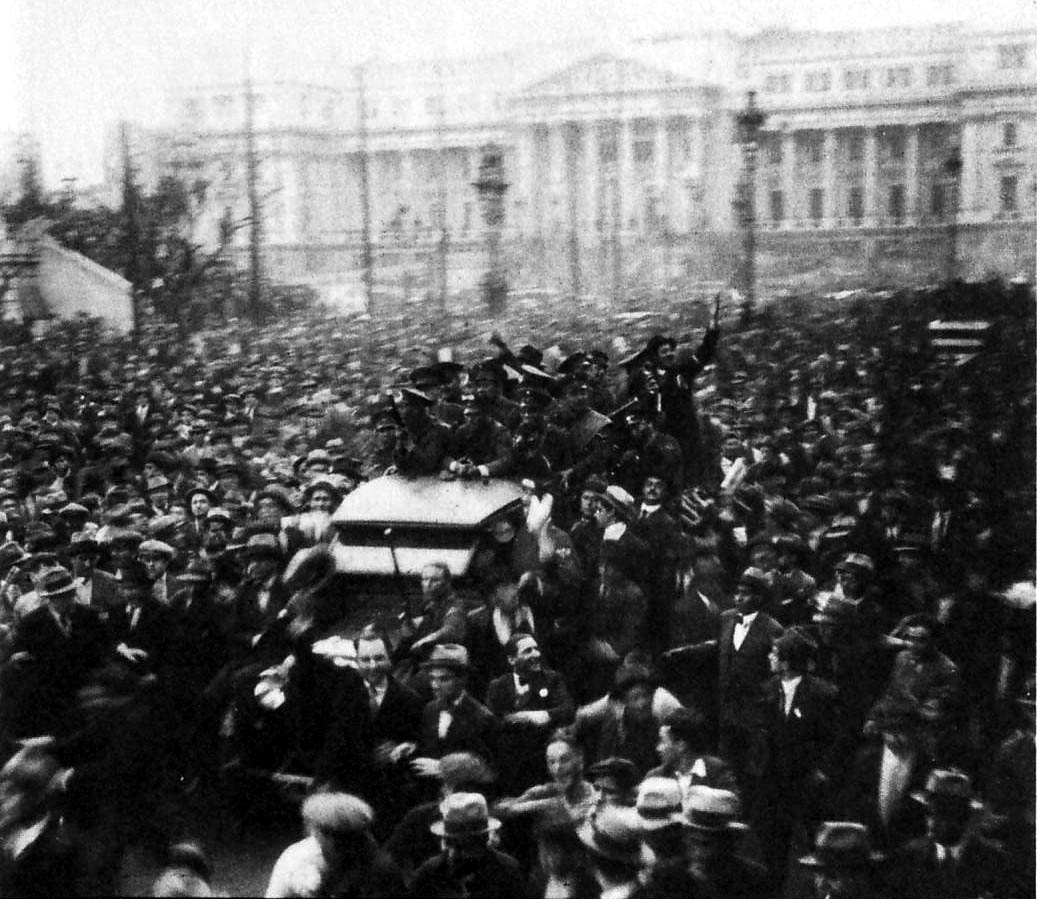
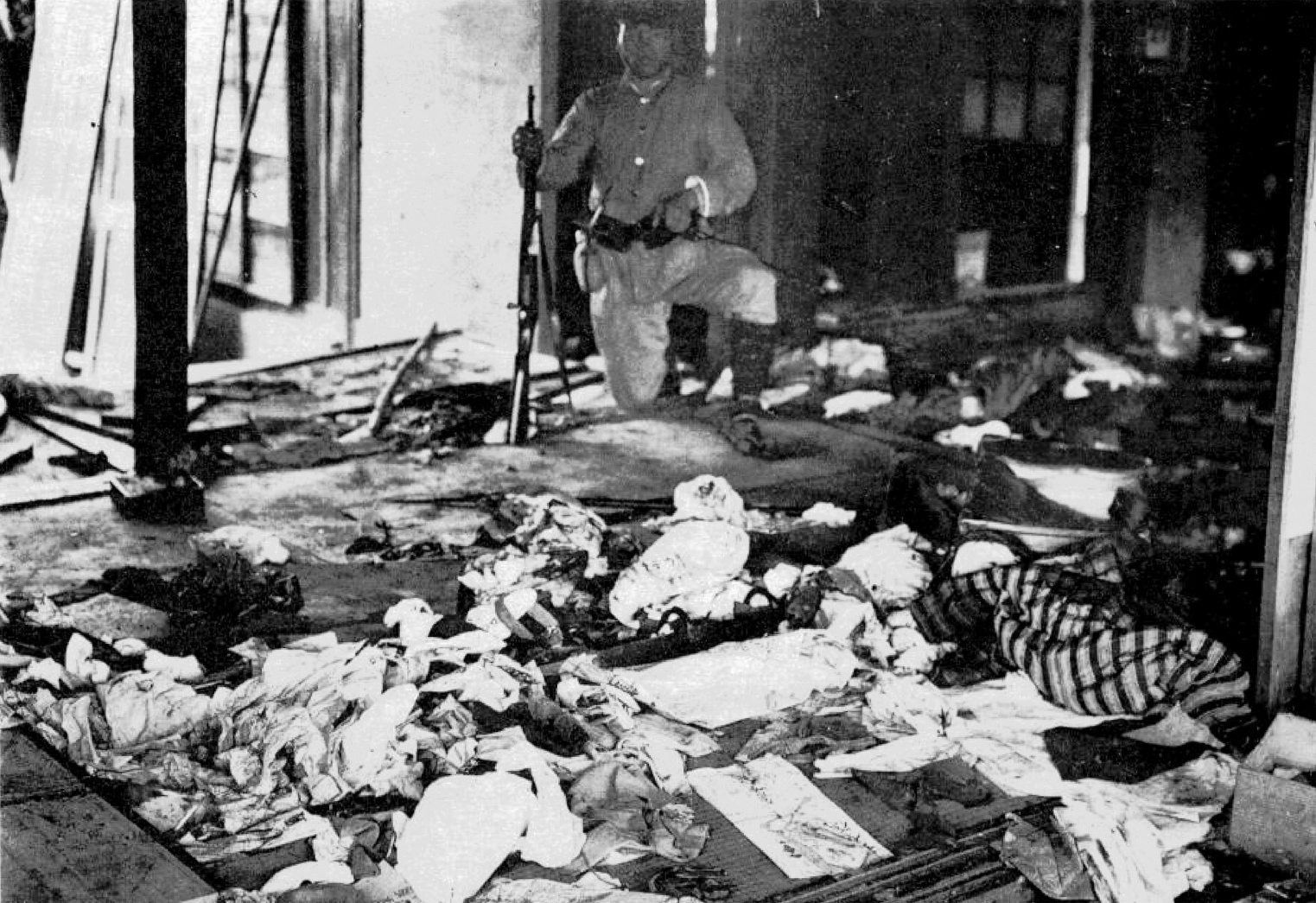
From top to bottom, left to right:
- The Salt March, led by Mahatma Gandhi, begins as nonviolent civil disobedience against the British salt monopoly, inspiring the Indian independence movement;
- The 1930 FIFA World Cup in Uruguay inaugurates the world’s premier international football tournament, with the host nation defeating Argentina;
- Clyde Tombaugh discovers Pluto at Lowell Observatory, expanding knowledge of the solar system;
- The Revolution of 1930 overthrows Brazilian President Washington Luís, bringing Getúlio Vargas to power;
- The 1930 Argentine coup d'état deposes President Hipólito Yrigoyen, starting the "Infamous Decade";
- The Musha Incident sees the Seediq people rise against Japanese colonial rule in Taiwan, resulting in a brutal suppression.

1930 (MCMXXX) was a common year starting on Wednesday of the Gregorian calendar, the 1930th year of the Common Era (CE) and Anno Domini (AD) designations, the 930th year of the 2nd millennium, the 30th year of the 20th century, and the 1st year of the 1930s decade.

== Events ==
=== January ===
- January 15 – The Moon moves into its nearest point to Earth, called perigee, at the same time as its fullest phase of the Lunar Cycle. This is the closest moon distance at 356,397 km (221,455 mi) in recent history, and the next one will be on January 1, 2257, at 356,371 km (221,439 mi).
- January 26 – The Indian National Congress declares this date as Independence Day, or as the day for Purna Swaraj (Complete Independence).
- January 28 – The first patent for a field-effect transistor is granted in the United States, to Julius Edgar Lilienfeld.
- January 30 – Pavel Molchanov launches a radiosonde from Slutsk in the Soviet Union.

=== February ===
- February 10 – The Việt Nam Quốc Dân Đảng launch the Yên Bái mutiny in the hope of ending French colonial rule in Vietnam.
- February 18 – While studying photographs taken in January, Clyde Tombaugh confirms the existence of Pluto, a celestial body considered a planet until redefined as a dwarf planet in 2006.

=== March ===
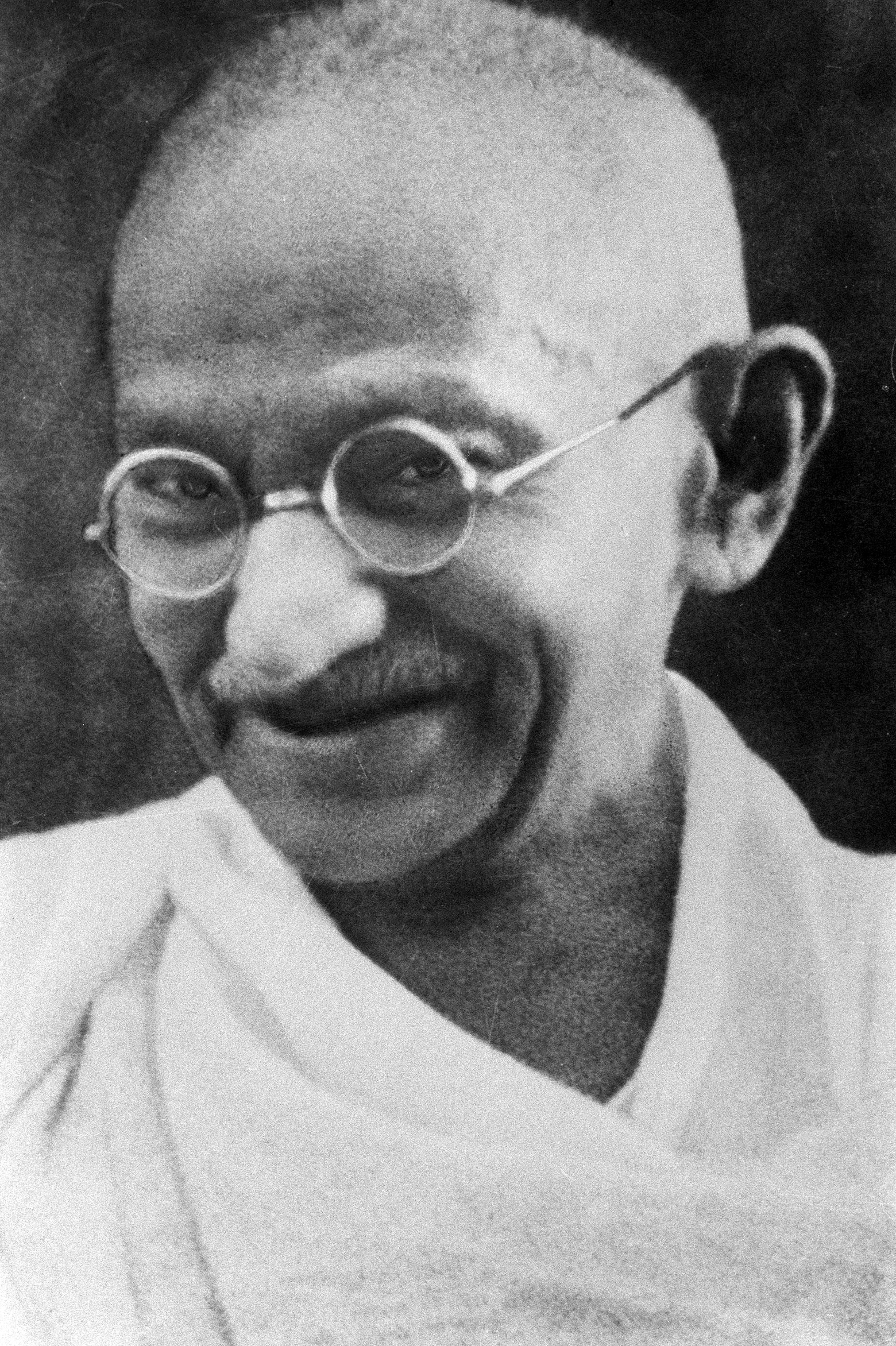
Mahatma Gandhi

- March 2
  - Mahatma Gandhi informs the British Viceroy of India that civil disobedience will begin the following week.
  - André Tardieu begins his second term as Prime Minister of France.
- March 6
  - International Unemployment Day is observed in countries throughout the world.
  - The first frozen foods of Clarence Birdseye go on sale in Springfield, Massachusetts.
- March 12 – Mahatma Gandhi sets off on a 200-mile march towards the sea with 78 followers to protest against the British monopoly on salt in India; more will join them during the Salt March that ends on April 5.
- March 28 – The government of Turkey requests the international community to adopt Istanbul and Ankara, as the official names for Constantinople and Angora. The U.S. State Department adopts the "Istanbul" form in May.
- March 29 – Heinrich Brüning is appointed Chancellor of Germany.
- March 31 – The Motion Picture Production Code (Hays Code) is instituted by the studios in the United States, imposing strict guidelines on the treatment of sex, crime, religion and violence in films for the next 40 years.

=== April ===
- April 6
  - In an act of civil disobedience, Mahatma Gandhi breaks the salt laws of British India by making salt by the sea at the end of the Salt March.
  - The International Left Opposition (ILO) is founded in Paris, France.
- April 11 – Anglo-Indian hunter Jim Corbett shoots the second of the man-eating tigers of Chowgarh.
- April 17 – Neoprene is invented by DuPont.
- April 18 – The Chittagong Rebellion begins in India with the Chittagong armoury raid.
- April 19 - Football Association of Indonesia (PSSI) founded.
- April 21
  - A fire in the Ohio Penitentiary in Columbus, United States kills 320 people.
  - The Turkestan–Siberia Railway is completed.
- April 22 – The United Kingdom, Japan and the United States sign the London Naval Treaty to regulate submarine warfare and limit naval shipbuilding.

=== May ===
- May 6 – The 7.1 M_{w} Salmas earthquake shakes northwestern Iran and southeastern Turkey, with a maximum Mercalli intensity of IX (Violent); up to 3,000 people are killed.
- May 10 – The National Pan-Hellenic Council is founded in Washington, D.C.
- May 15 – Nurse Ellen Church becomes the world's first flight attendant, working on a Boeing Air Transport trimotor.
- May 16 – Rafael Trujillo is elected president of the Dominican Republic.
- May 17 – French Prime Minister André Tardieu decides to withdraw the remaining French troops from the Rhineland (they depart by June 30).
- May 24 – Amy Johnson lands in Darwin, Australia, becoming the first woman to fly solo from England to Australia (she left on May 5 for the 11,000 mile flight).

=== June ===
- June 7 – Carl Gustaf Ekman becomes Prime Minister of Sweden, for the second and final time.
- June 14 – The Federal Bureau of Narcotics is established under the United States Department of the Treasury, replacing the Narcotics Division of the Prohibition Unit.
- June 17 – President Herbert Hoover signs the Smoot–Hawley Tariff Act into law, implementing protectionist trade policies in the United States. It has the incidental effect of defining an antique as older than 1830.

=== July ===
- July 3–10 – The First Eastern Women's Congress takes place in Damascus in Syria.
- July 4 – The dedication of George Washington's sculpted head is held at Mount Rushmore, South Dakota.
- July 5 – The Seventh Lambeth Conference of Anglican bishops opens. This conference approves the use of birth control in limited circumstances, a move away from the Christian views on birth control expressed by the Sixth Conference a decade earlier.
- July 7
  - The far-right Lapua Movement marches in Helsinki, Finland.
  - Building of the Boulder Dam (later known as the Hoover Dam) is started on the Colorado River, in the United States.
- July 11 – Australian cricketer Don Bradman scores a world record 309 runs in one day, on his way to the highest individual Test innings of 334, during a Test match against England.
- July 13 – The inaugural FIFA World Cup begins: Lucien Laurent scores the first goal, for France against Mexico.
- July 19 – Georges Simenon's detective character Inspector Jules Maigret makes his first appearance in print under Simenon's own name, when the novel Pietr-le-Letton (known in English as The Strange Case of Peter the Lett) begins serialization in a French weekly magazine.
- July 28 – R. B. Bennett defeats William Lyon Mackenzie King in federal elections and becomes the Prime Minister of Canada.
- July 29 – British airship R100 sets out for a successful 78-hour passage to Canada.
- July 30 – Uruguay beats Argentina 4–2 to win the first FIFA World Cup final in Association football, at Estadio Centenario in Montevideo.

=== August ===
- August – The volcanic island of Anak Krakatau begins to form permanently in the Sunda Strait.
- August 7 – R. B. Bennett takes office as the eleventh Prime Minister of Canada.
- August 9 – The cartoon character Betty Boop debut in the Fleischer Studios short film Dizzy Dishes.
- August 12 – Turkish troops move into Persia to fight Kurdish insurgents.
- August 16 – The first British Empire Games open in Hamilton, Ontario, Canada.
- August 27 – A military junta takes over in Peru.

=== September ===
- September 3 – The huge 1930 San Zenón hurricane in the Caribbean demolishes most of the city of Santo Domingo in the Dominican Republic.
- September 6 – 1930 Argentine coup d'état: José Félix Uriburu carries out a military coup, overthrowing Hipólito Yrigoyen, President of Argentina.
- September 8 – Scotch Tape, invented by Richard Gurley Drew, is sold by the 3M company in the United States for the first time.
- September 14 – 1930 German federal election: National Socialists win 107 seats in the German Parliament, the Reichstag (18.3% of all the votes), making them the second largest party.
- September 17 – The Kurdish Ararat rebellion is suppressed by the Turks.
- September 20 – The Eastern Catholic Rite Syro-Malankara Catholic Church is formed.
- September 27 – İsmet İnönü forms a new government in Turkey (6th government).

=== October ===
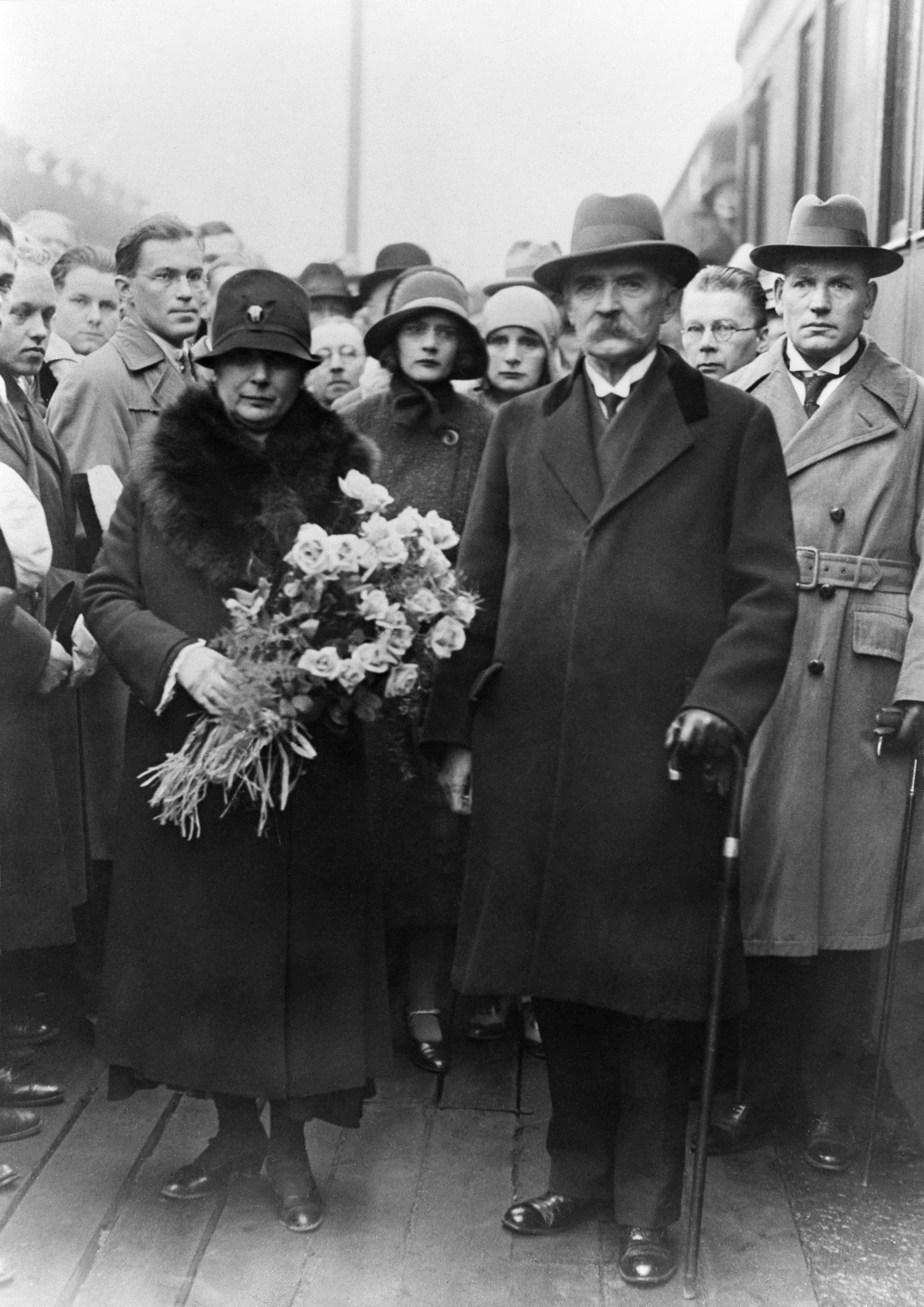
Former President of Finland K. J. Ståhlberg and his wife Ester at the Helsinki Central Station after their kidnapping. In the middle of picture their daughter Elli stands behind them.

- October – The Indochinese Communist Party is formed.
- October 1 – British rule of Weihaiwei ends, as it is returned to China.
- October 3 – The German Socialist Labour Party in Poland – Left is founded, following a split in the DSAP in Łódź.
- October 5 – British airship R101, the world's largest flying craft, crashes in France en route to India, on its first overseas flight, resulting in the loss of 48 lives, with six survivors. Those killed include Britain's Air Minister, Christopher Thomson, 1st Baron Thomson.
- October 14 – Ståhlberg kidnapping: The former and first President of Finland, Kaarlo Juho Ståhlberg, and his wife, Ester Ståhlberg, are kidnapped from their home by members of the far-right Lapua Movement but released unharmed.
- October 20 – The British Passfield white paper demands restrictions on Jewish immigration into Mandatory Palestine.
- October 24 – Revolution of 1930: Getúlio Vargas overthrows Washington Luís.
- October 27 – Ratifications are exchanged in London on the first London Naval Treaty signed in April, modifying the Washington Naval Treaty of 1922. Its arms limitation provisions go into effect immediately, hence putting more limits on the expensive naval arms race between its five signatories (the United Kingdom, the United States, the Empire of Japan, France and Italy.)

=== November ===
- November 2 – Haile Selassie is crowned emperor of Ethiopia.
- November 3 – Getúlio Vargas becomes president of Brazil.
- November 25
  - An earthquake in the Izu Peninsula of Japan kills 223 people and destroys 650 buildings.
  - Cecil George Paine, a pathologist at the Sheffield Royal Infirmary in England, achieves the first recorded cure (of an eye infection) using penicillin.

=== December ===
- December – All adult Turkish women are given the right to vote in elections.
- December 19 – Mount Merapi volcano in central Java, Indonesia, erupts, destroying numerous villages and killing 1,300 people.
- December 24 – In London, inventor Harry Grindell Matthews demonstrates his device to project pictures on clouds.
- December 29 – Sir Muhammad Iqbal's presidential address in Allahabad introduces the two-nation theory, outlining a vision for the creation of Pakistan.
- December 31 – The Papal encyclical Casti connubii, issued by Pope Pius XI, stresses the sanctity of marriage, prohibits Roman Catholics from using any form of artificial birth control, and reaffirms the Catholic prohibition on abortion.

=== Date unknown ===
- Bernhard Schmidt invents the Schmidt camera.

== Births ==
=== January ===
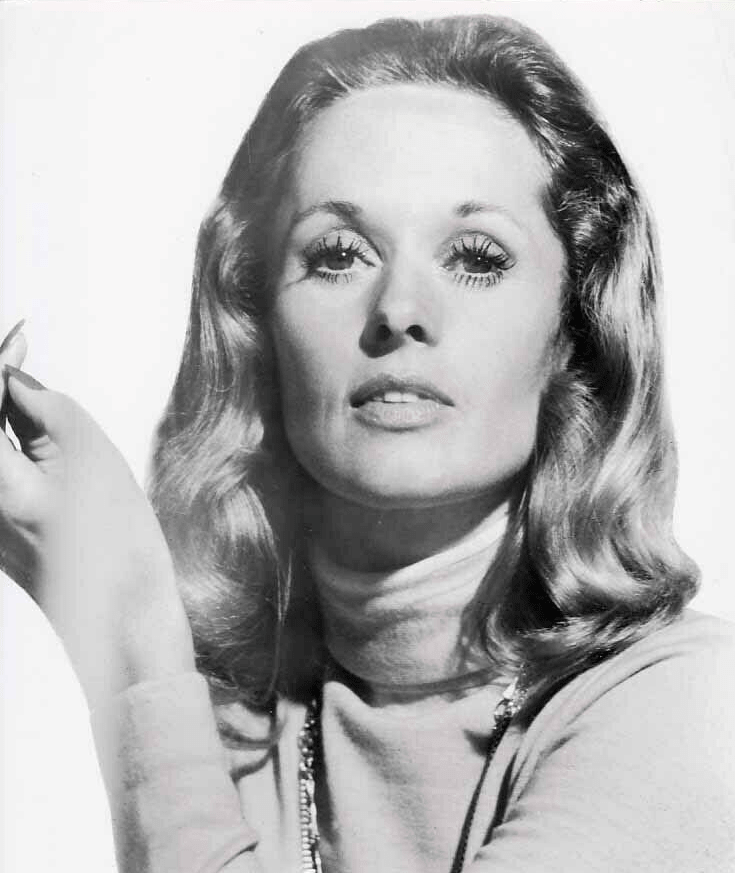
Tippi Hedren

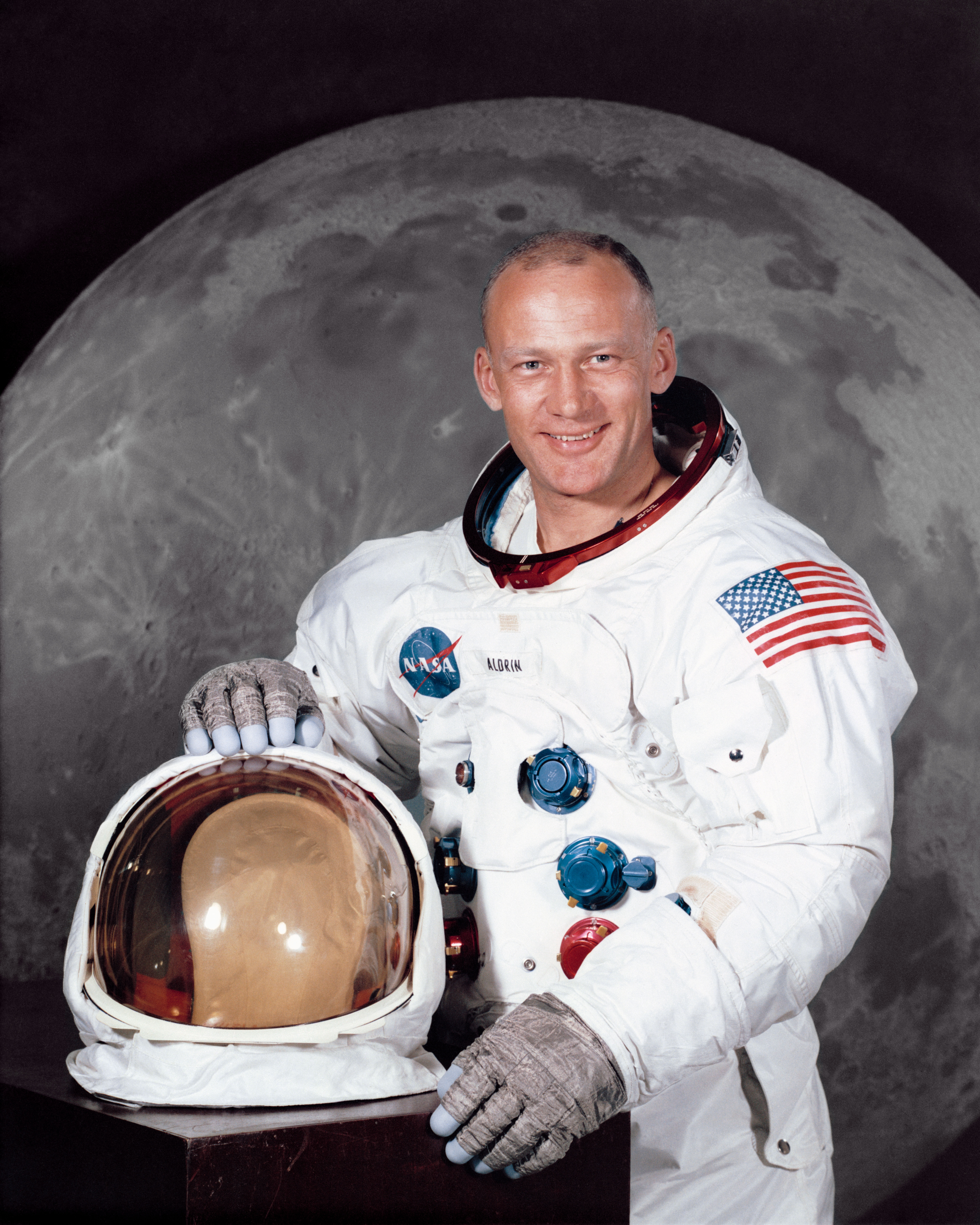
Buzz Aldrin

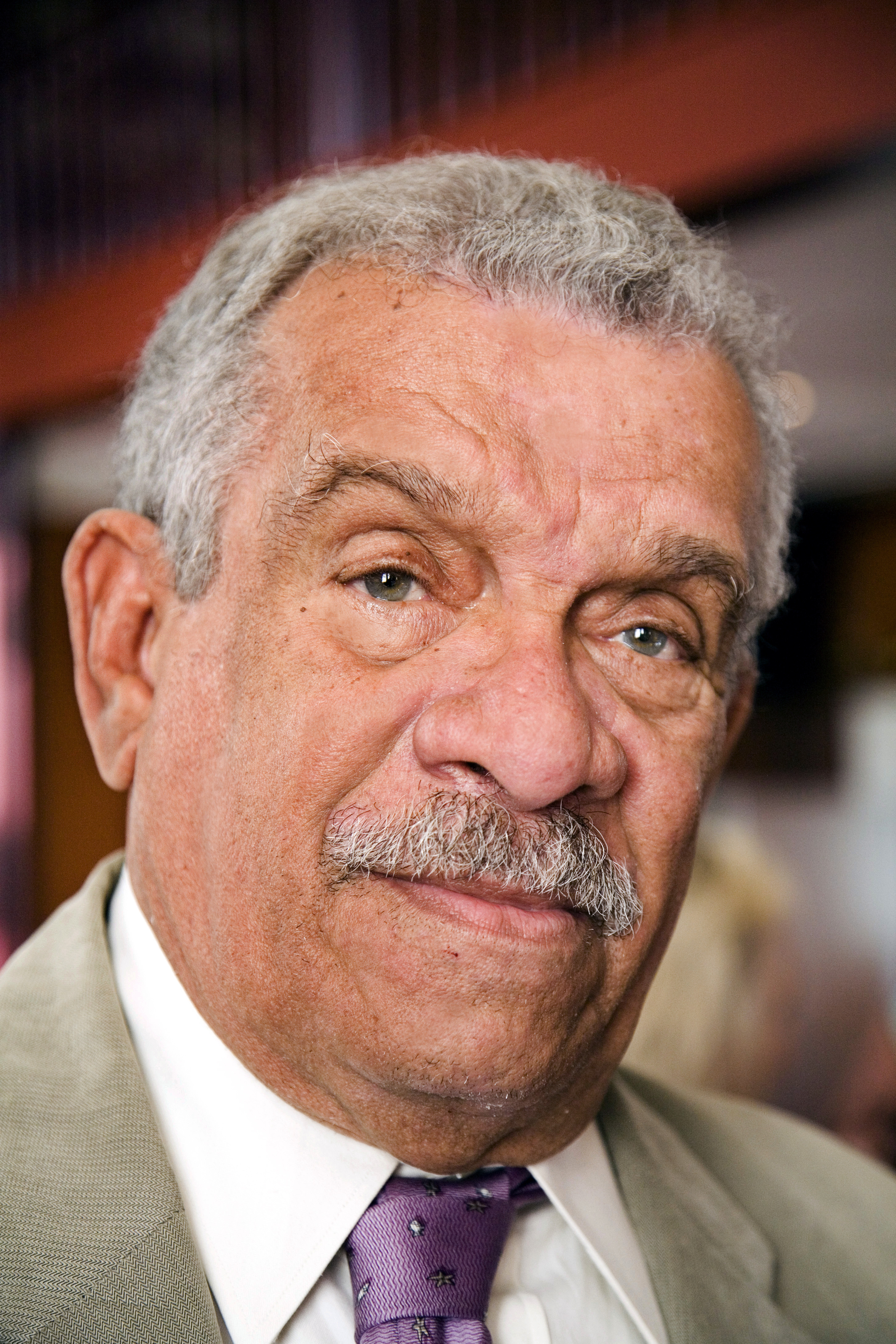
Derek Walcott

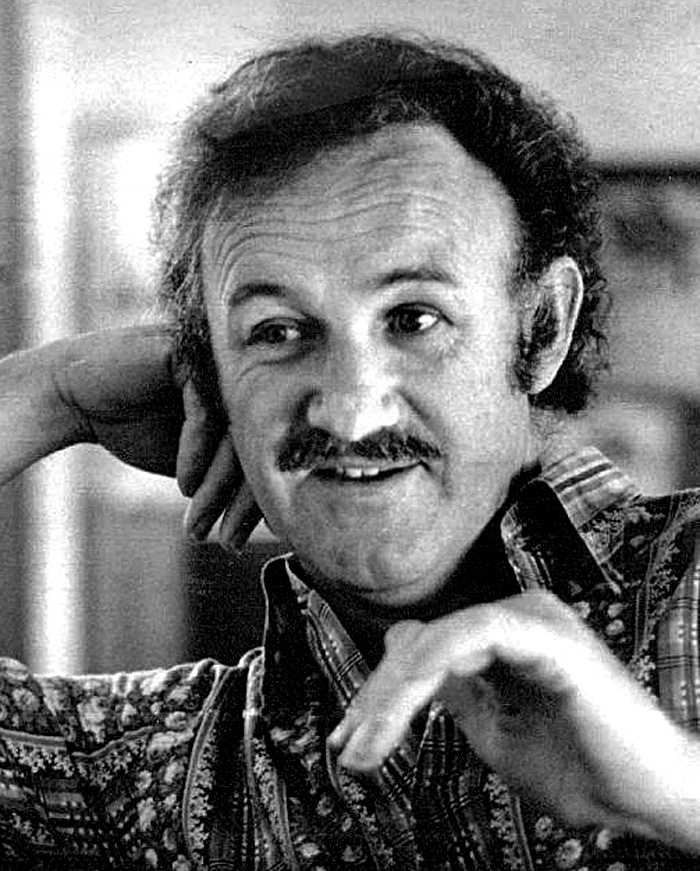
Gene Hackman

- January 1
  - Gaafar Nimeiry, 4th President of Sudan (d. 2009)
  - Ty Hardin, American actor (d. 2017)
  - Frederick Wiseman, American director and producer (d. 2026)
- January 3
  - Robert Loggia, American actor (d. 2015)
  - Ahmed Osman, Prime Minister of Morocco
- January 5 – M. R. Srinivasan, Indian nuclear scientist (d. 2025)
- January 6
  - "Professor Tanaka" (Charles Kalani Jr.), American wrestler and actor (d. 2000)
  - Vic Tayback, American actor (d. 1990)
- January 9 – Pavel Kolchin, Soviet Olympic cross-country skier (d. 2010)
- January 10 – Roy E. Disney, Disney executive (d. 2009)
- January 11 – Rod Taylor, Australian actor (d. 2015)
- January 12
  - Tim Horton, Canadian hockey player, co-founder of Tim Hortons fast food chain (d. 1974)
  - Jennifer Johnston, Irish novelist (d. 2025)
- January 15 – Hédi Baccouche, Prime Minister of Tunisia (d. 2020)
- January 19 – Tippi Hedren, American actress
- January 20 – Buzz Aldrin, American pilot, astronaut (Apollo 11), second person to set foot on the Moon
- January 21 – Mainza Chona, Zambian politician and diplomat (d. 2001)
- January 23
  - Derek Walcott, West Indian writer, Nobel Prize laureate (d. 2017)
  - William Pogue, American astronaut (d. 2014)
- January 24 – Terence Bayler, New Zealand actor (d. 2016)
- January 27 – Bobby Bland, African-American R&B musician (d. 2013)
- January 30
  - Gene Hackman, American actor and novelist (d. 2025)
  - Magnus Malan, South African soldier, Minister of Defence (1980–1991) (d. 2011)

=== February ===
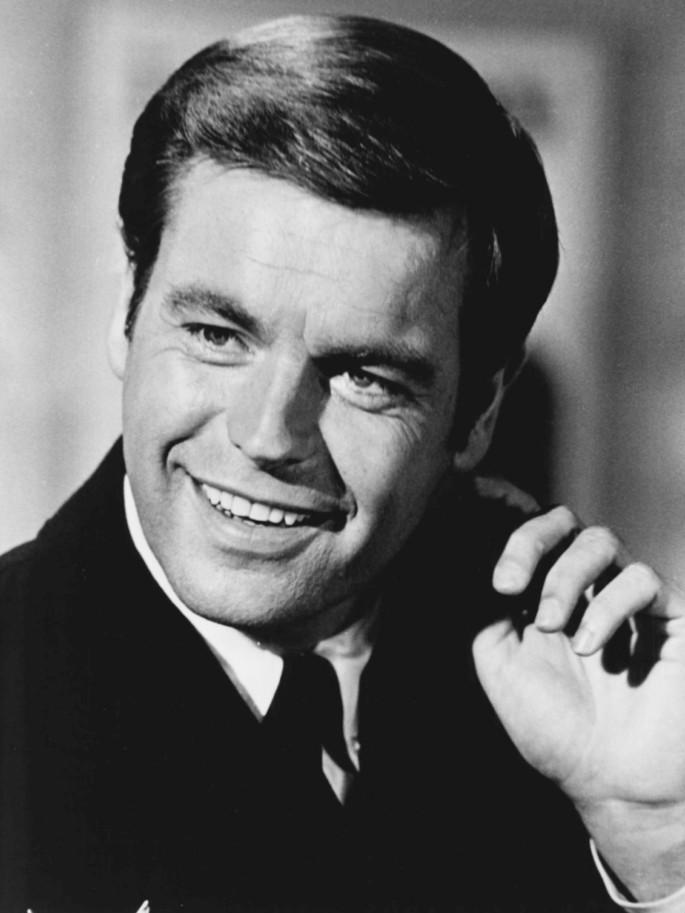
Robert Wagner

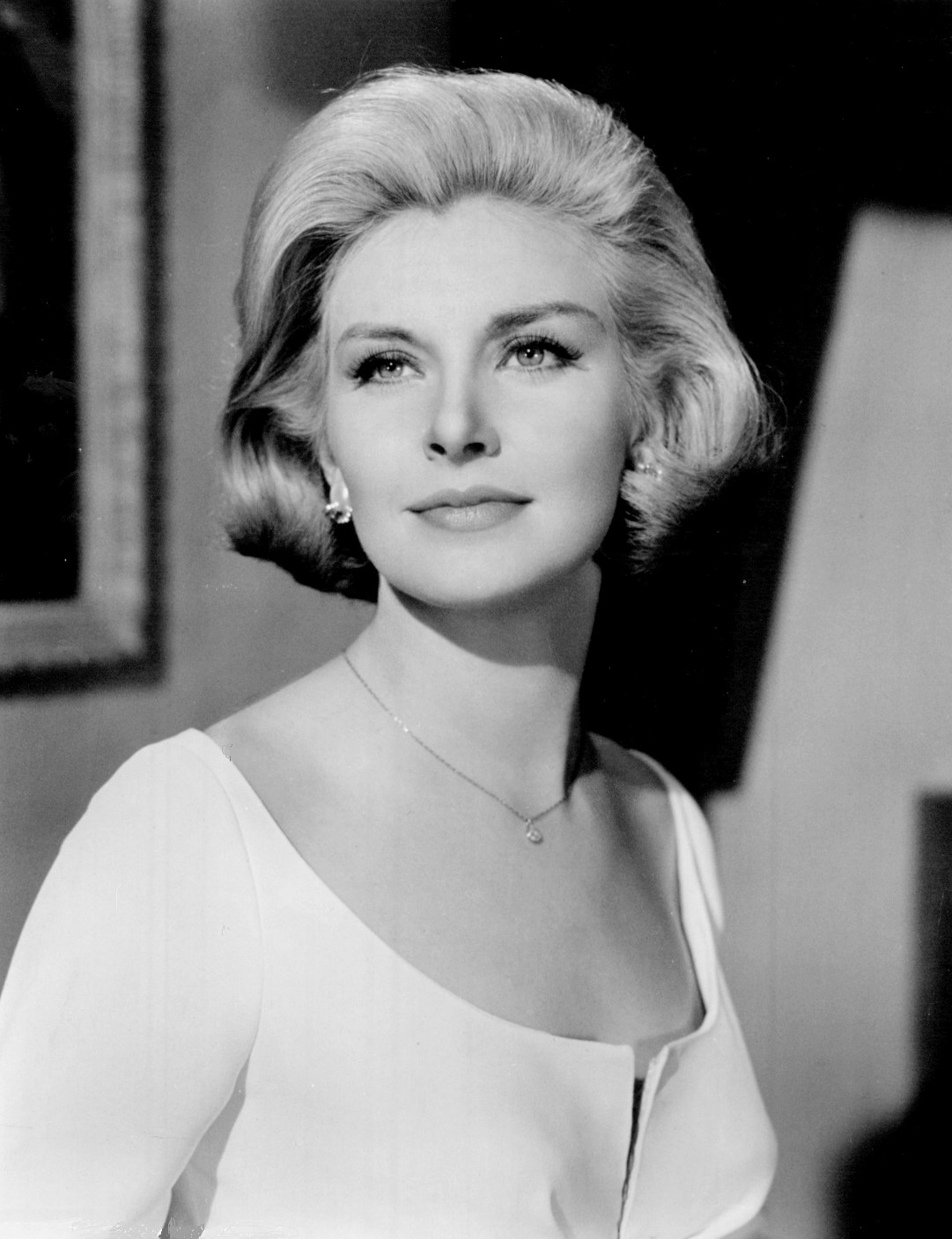
Joanne Woodward

- February 1
  - Shahabuddin Ahmed, 12th president of Bangladesh (d. 2022)
  - Hussain Muhammad Ershad, 10th president of Bangladesh (d. 2019)
- February 3 – Mani Krishnaswami, Carnatic music vocalist from Tamil Nadu, India (d. 2002)
- February 4 – Jim Loscutoff, American basketball player (d. 2015)
- February 7 – Ikutaro Kakehashi, Japanese engineer and entrepreneur (d. 2017)
- February 8 – Alejandro Rey, Argentine-American actor (d. 1987)
- February 10 – Robert Wagner, American actor
- February 13
  - Ernst Fuchs, Austrian painter (d. 2015)
  - Israel Kirzner, English-born American economist, author and academic
- February 17 – Ruth Rendell, British author (d. 2015)
- February 19
  - John Frankenheimer, American film director (d. 2002)
  - K. Viswanath, Indian actor, director and screenwriter (d. 2023)
- February 22 – Marni Nixon, American vocalist (d. 2016)
- February 23 – Goro Shimura, Japanese mathematician (d. 2019)
- February 27 – Joanne Woodward, American actress
- February 28 – Leon Cooper, American physicist, Nobel Prize laureate (d. 2024)

=== March ===
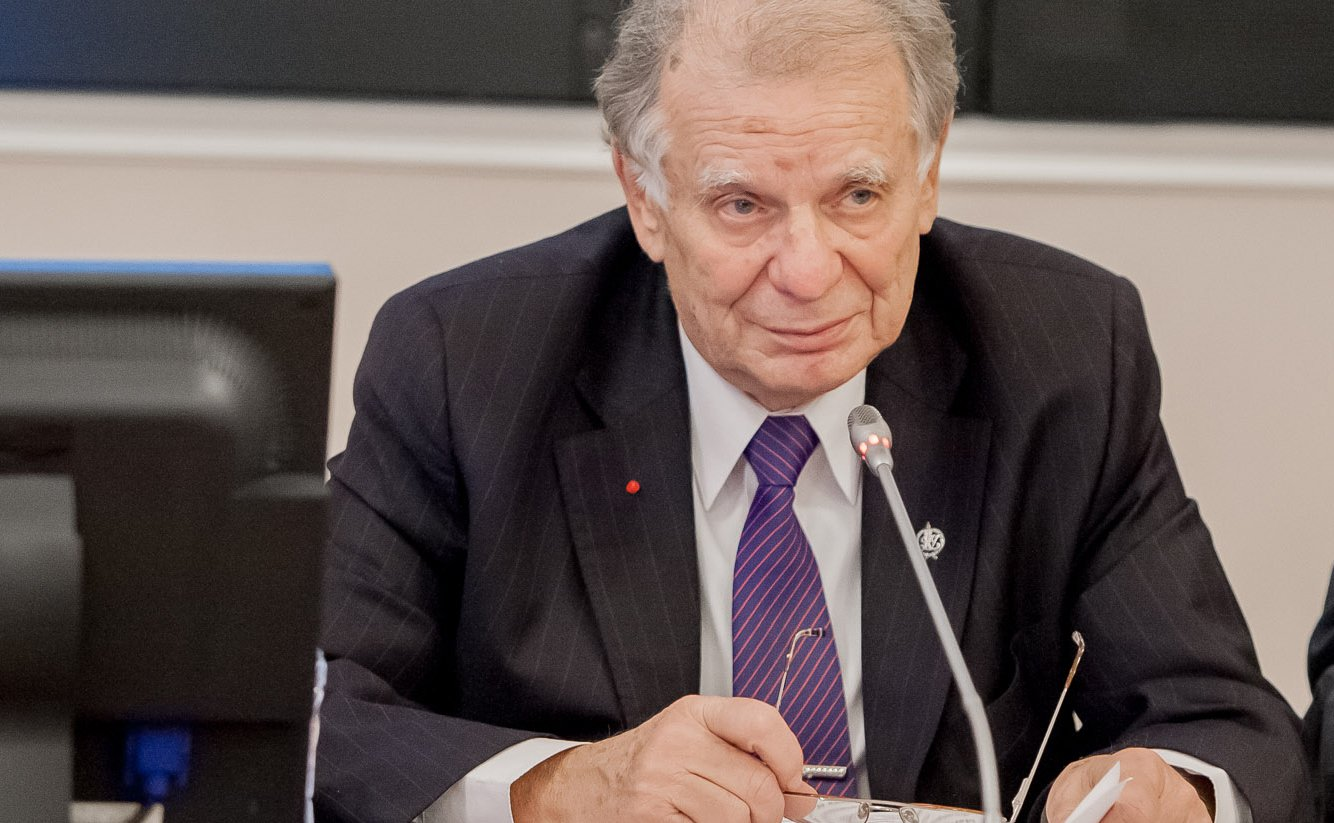
Zhores Alferov

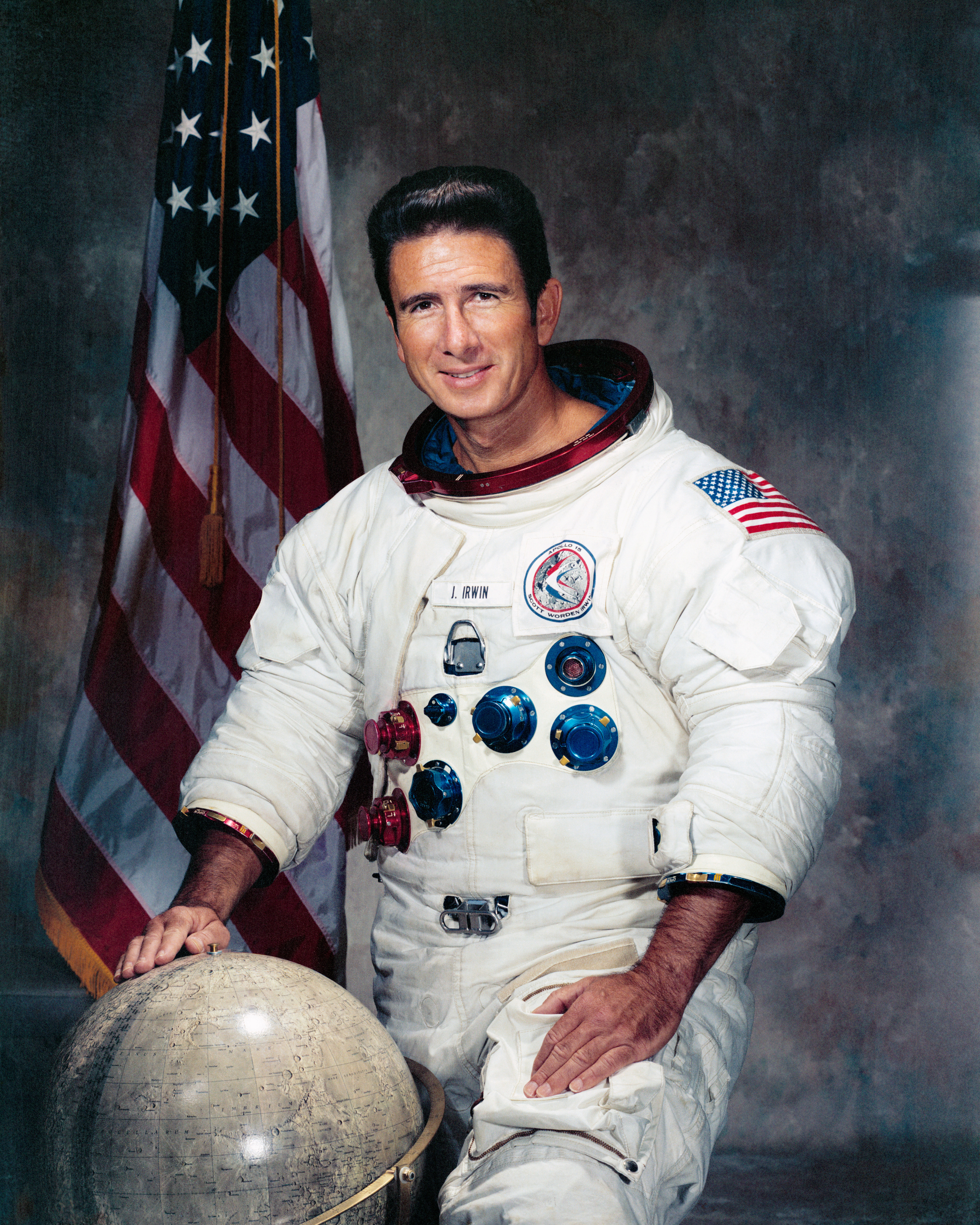
James Irwin

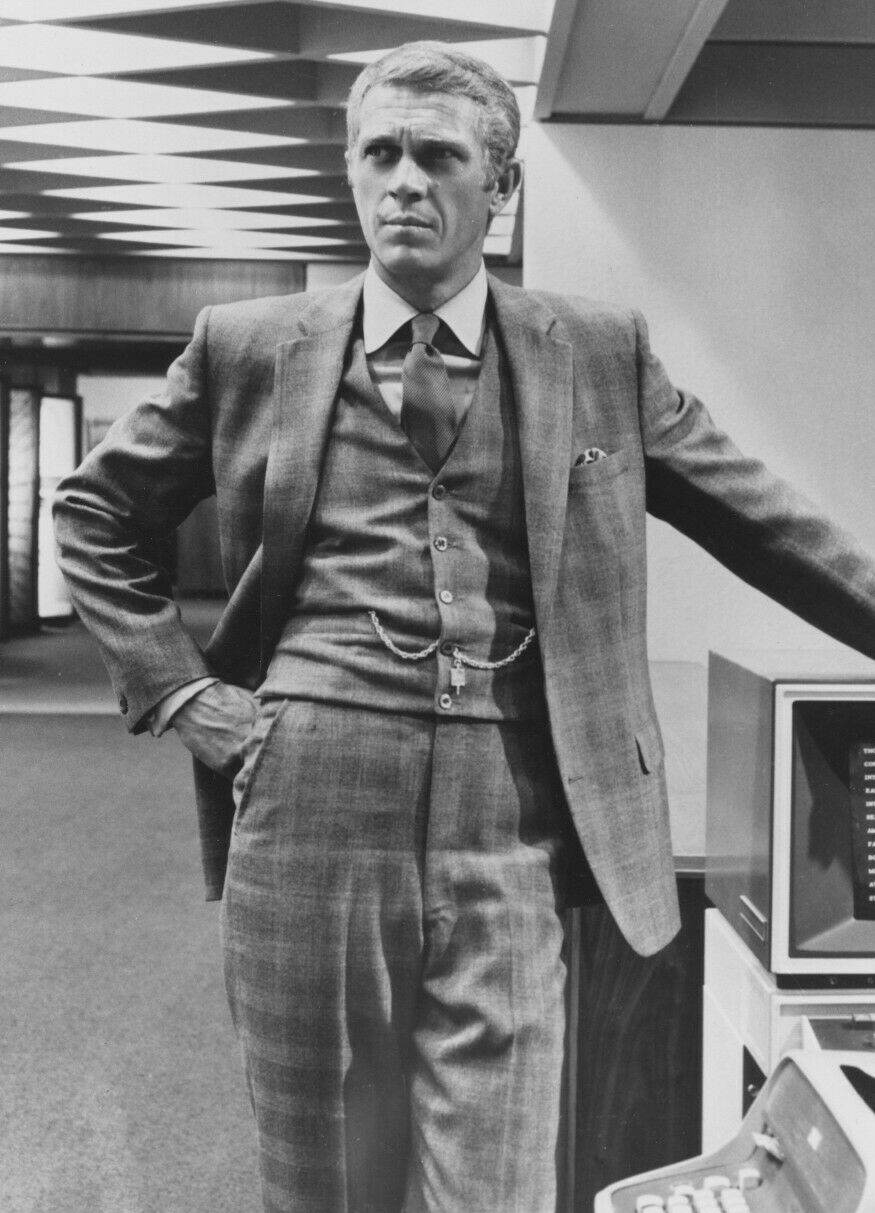
Steve McQueen

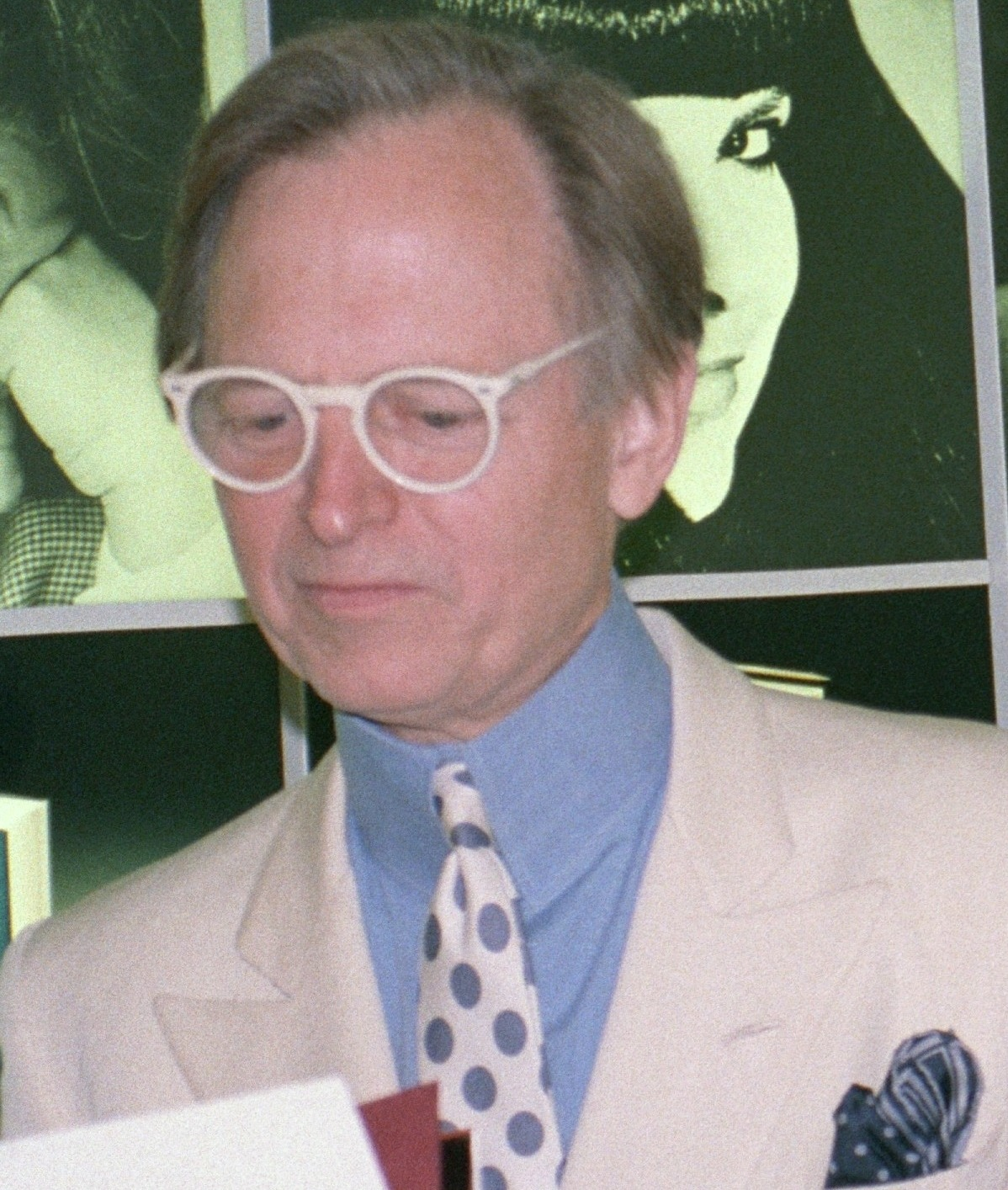
Tom Wolfe

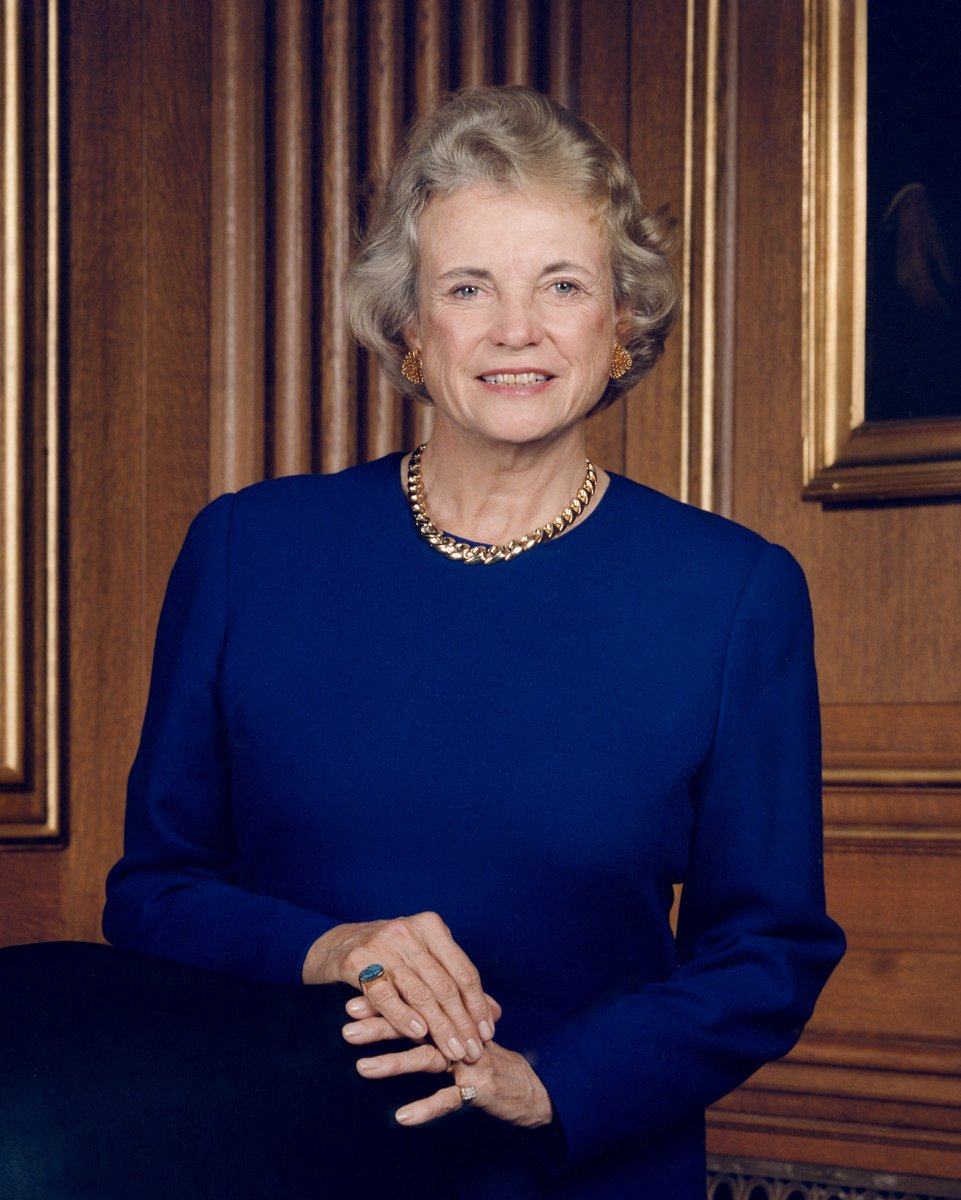
Sandra Day O'Connor

- March 2 – Tom Wolfe, American author, journalist (d. 2018)
- March 3
  - Heiner Geißler, German politician (d. 2017)
  - Ion Iliescu, 2-time President of Romania (d. 2025)
  - K. S. Rajah, Singaporean Senior Counsel, Judicial Commissioner of the Supreme Court (d. 2010)
- March 6
  - Allison Hayes, American actress (d. 1977)
  - Lorin Maazel, French-born American orchestral conductor (d. 2014)
- March 7
  - Antony Armstrong-Jones, 1st Earl of Snowdon, English photographer, royal spouse (d. 2017)
  - Daphne Osborne, English botanist (d. 2006)
- March 8 – Douglas Hurd, English politician
- March 9 – Ornette Coleman, American jazz saxophonist (d. 2015)
- March 14
  - Irma Adelman, Romanian-born economist (d. 2017)
  - Helga Feddersen, German actress (d. 1990)
- March 15
  - Alba Arnova, Italian-Argentine ballerina, actress (d. 2018)
  - Zhores Alferov, Russian physicist, Nobel Prize laureate (d. 2019)
  - Shadi Abdel Salam, Egyptian film director, screenwriter and costume and set designer (d. 1986)
- March 17 – James Irwin, American astronaut (d. 1991)
- March 18 – Adam Maida, American Roman Catholic prelate; Archbishop of Detroit (1990–2009)
- March 19 – Gualtiero Marchesi, Italian chef and restaurateur (d. 2017)
- March 20 – Thomas Williams, New Zealand cardinal (d. 2023)
- March 22
  - Sir Lynden Pindling, 1st prime minister of the Bahamas (d. 2000)
  - Pat Robertson, American televangelist, motivational speaker, author and television host (d. 2023)
  - Stephen Sondheim, American composer and lyricist (d. 2021)
- March 24
  - David Dacko, 1st President of the Central African Republic (d. 2003)
  - Steve McQueen, American actor (d. 1980)
- March 26 – Sandra Day O'Connor, American politician, Associate Justice of the Supreme Court of the United States (d. 2023)
- March 27 – Daniel Spoerri, Romanian-Swiss artist and writer (d. 2024)
- March 28
  - Robert Ashley, American composer (d. 2014)
  - Jerome Isaac Friedman, American physicist, Nobel Prize laureate
  - Albert S. Ruddy, Canadian film and television producer (d. 2024)
- March 29
  - Anerood Jugnauth, Mauritian politician, 3-time Prime Minister of Mauritius, and 4th President of Mauritius (d. 2021)
  - John Marshall, Australian swimmer (d. 1957)
- March 30
  - John Astin, American actor
  - Rolf Harris, Australian entertainer and convicted sex offender (d. 2023)
- March 31 – Julián Herranz Casado, Spanish cardinal

=== April ===
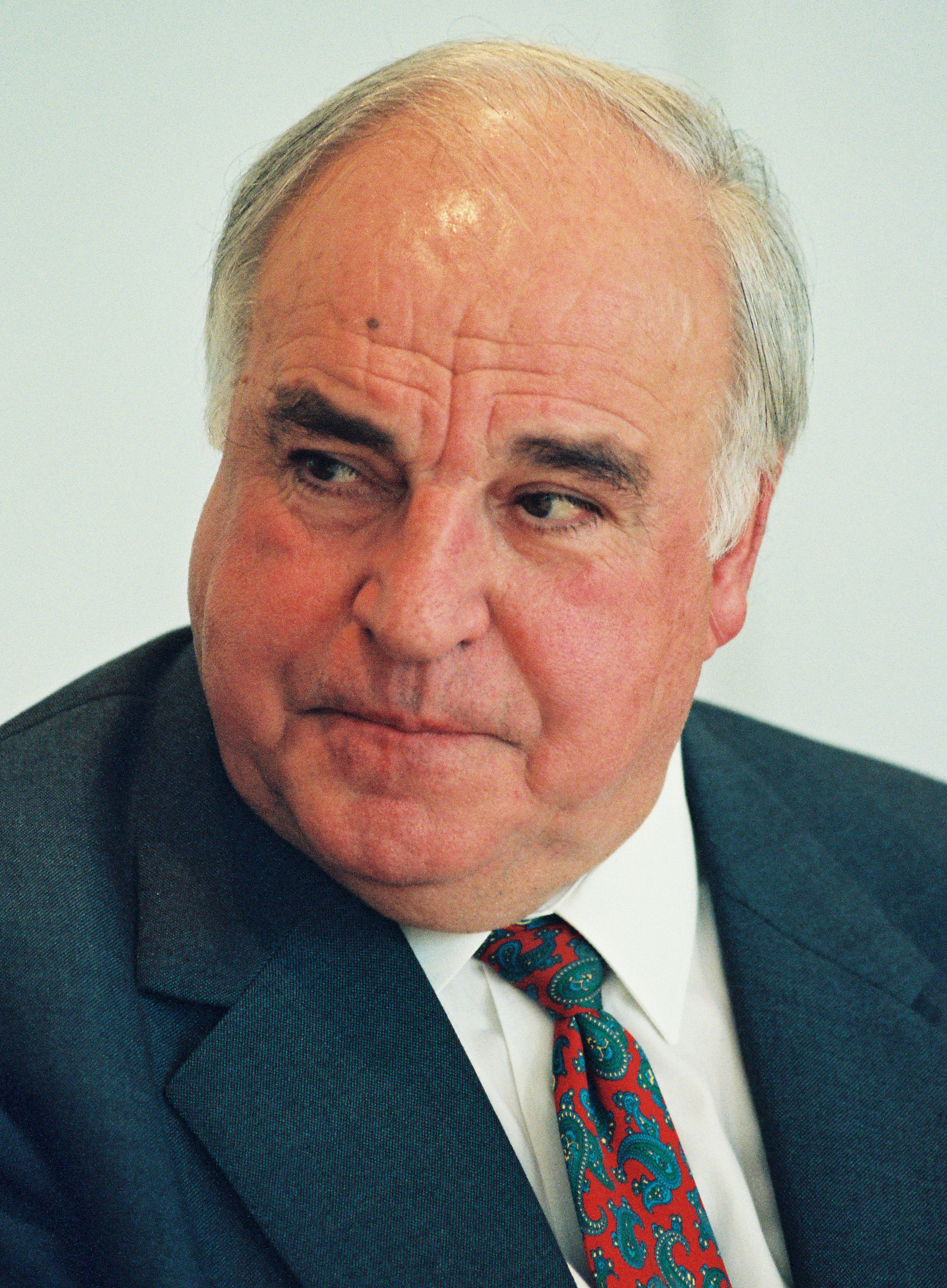
Helmut Kohl

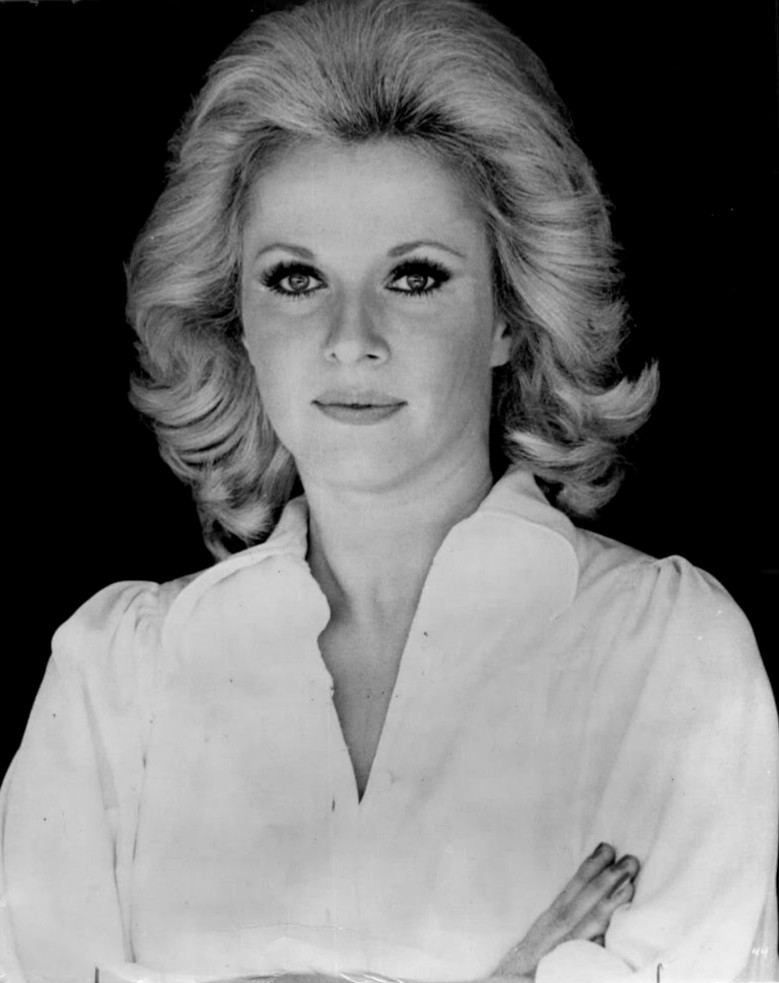
Mary Costa

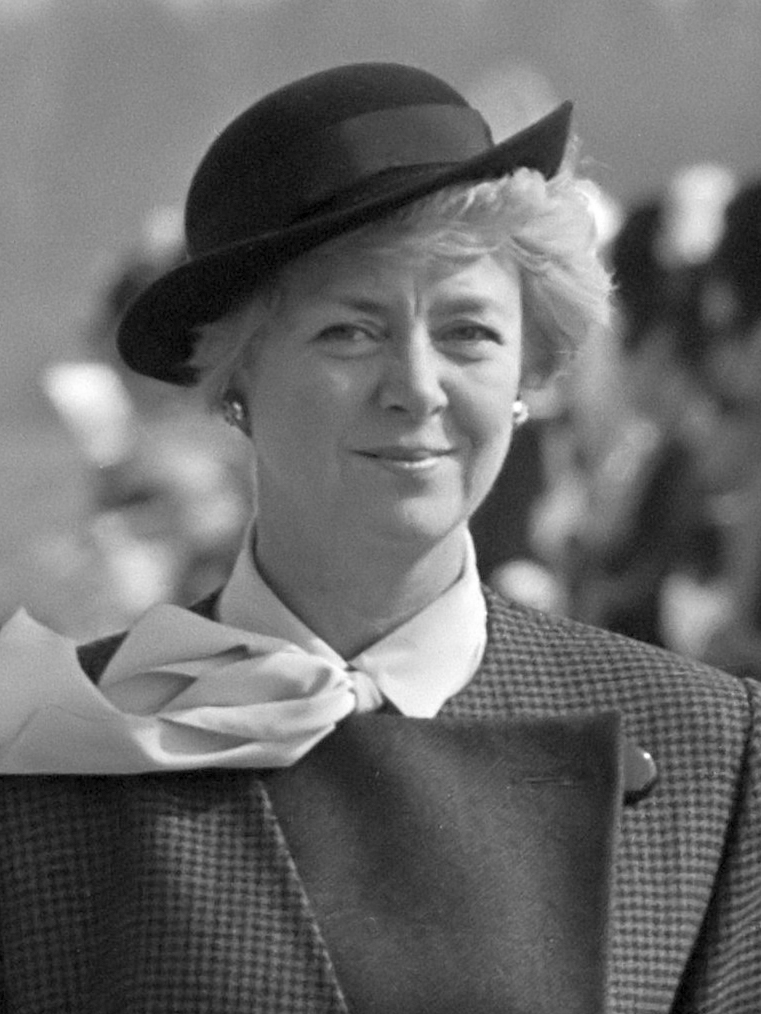
Vigdís Finnbogadóttir

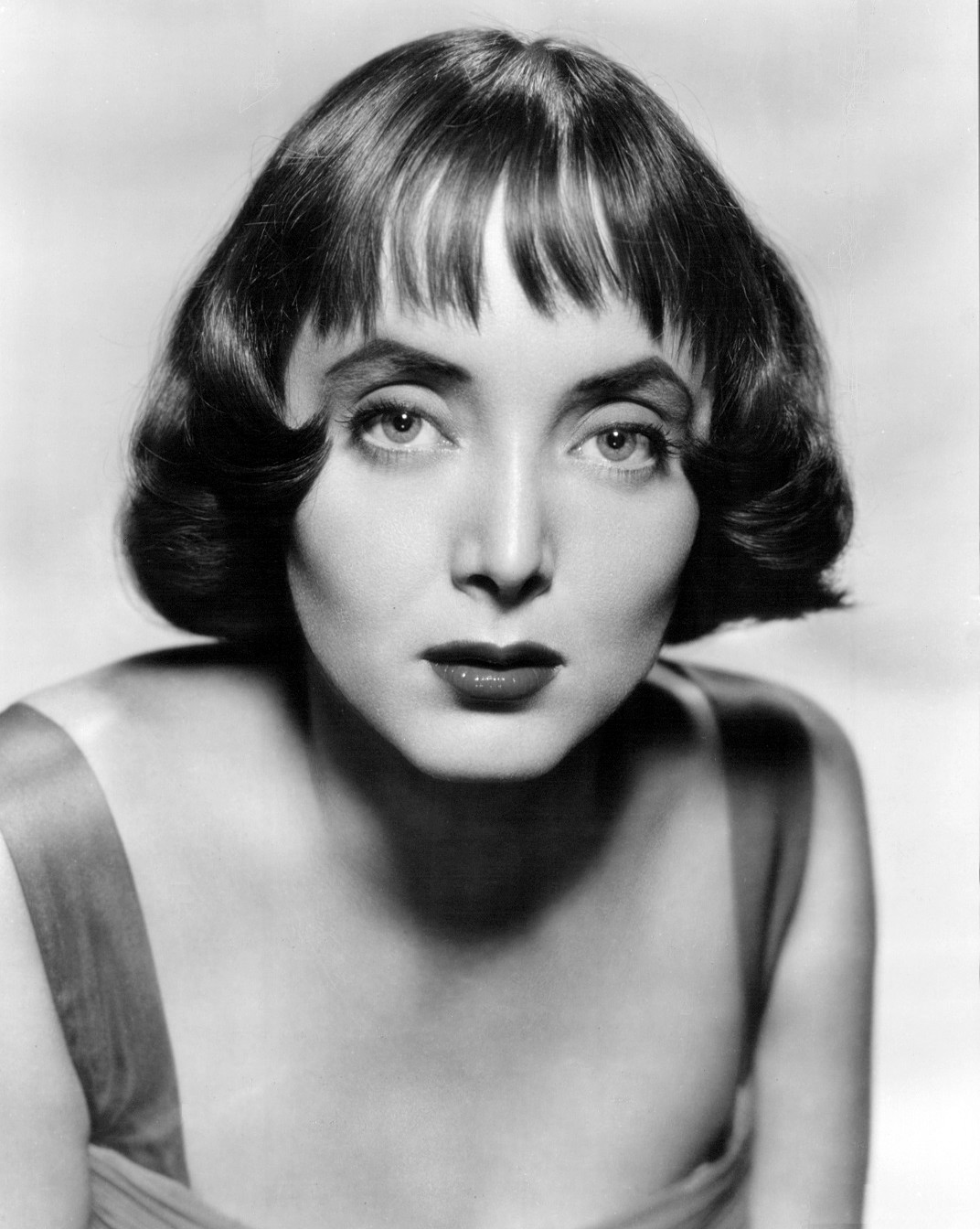
Carolyn Jones

- April 1
  - Grace Lee Whitney, American actress (Star Trek) (d. 2015)
  - Ásta Sigurðardóttir, Icelandic writer and visual artist (d. 1971)
- April 3
  - Lawton Chiles, American politician, U.S. Senator (Florida), 41st Governor of Florida (d. 1998)
  - Helmut Kohl, Chancellor of Germany (d. 2017)
- April 5
  - Mary Costa, American opera singer and actress
  - Pierre Lhomme, French cinematographer (d. 2019)
- April 7
  - Vilma Espín, Cuban revolutionary, feminist, and chemical engineer (d. 2007)
  - Andrew Sachs, German-born British actor (d. 2016)
- April 8 – Carlos Hugo, Duke of Parma (d. 2010)
- April 9 – F. Albert Cotton, American chemist (d. 2007)
- April 10
  - Claude Bolling, French jazz pianist and composer (d. 2020)
  - Dolores Huerta, American labor leader and civil rights activist (d. 2026)
  - Spede Pasanen, Finnish television personality (d. 2001)
- April 11
  - Nicholas F. Brady, American politician and businessman, 68th US Treasury Secretary
  - Anton LaVey, American author, musician, and occultist (d. 1997)
- April 12 – John Landy, Australian athlete and politician (d. 2022)
- April 14 – Bradford Dillman, American actor and author (d. 2018)
- April 15 – Vigdís Finnbogadóttir, President of Iceland
- April 16 – Herbie Mann, American jazz flutist (d. 2003)
- April 19 – Dick Sargent, American actor and gay activist (d. 1994)
- April 21 – Silvana Mangano, Italian actress (d. 1989)
- April 24
  - Richard Donner, American film director and producer (d. 2021)
  - José Sarney, 31st President of Brazil
- April 25 – Paul Mazursky, American director and writer (d. 2014)
- April 26 – Roger Moens, Belgian athlete and sportscaster
- April 28
  - James Baker, former United States Secretary of State and United States Secretary of the Treasury
  - Carolyn Jones, American actress (d. 1983)
- April 29
  - Jean Rochefort, French actor (d. 2017)
  - Mahmud of Terengganu, 16th Sultan of Terengganu (d. 1998)
- April 30 – Félix Guattari, French psychotherapist, philosopher, semiologist, and activist (d. 1992)

=== May ===
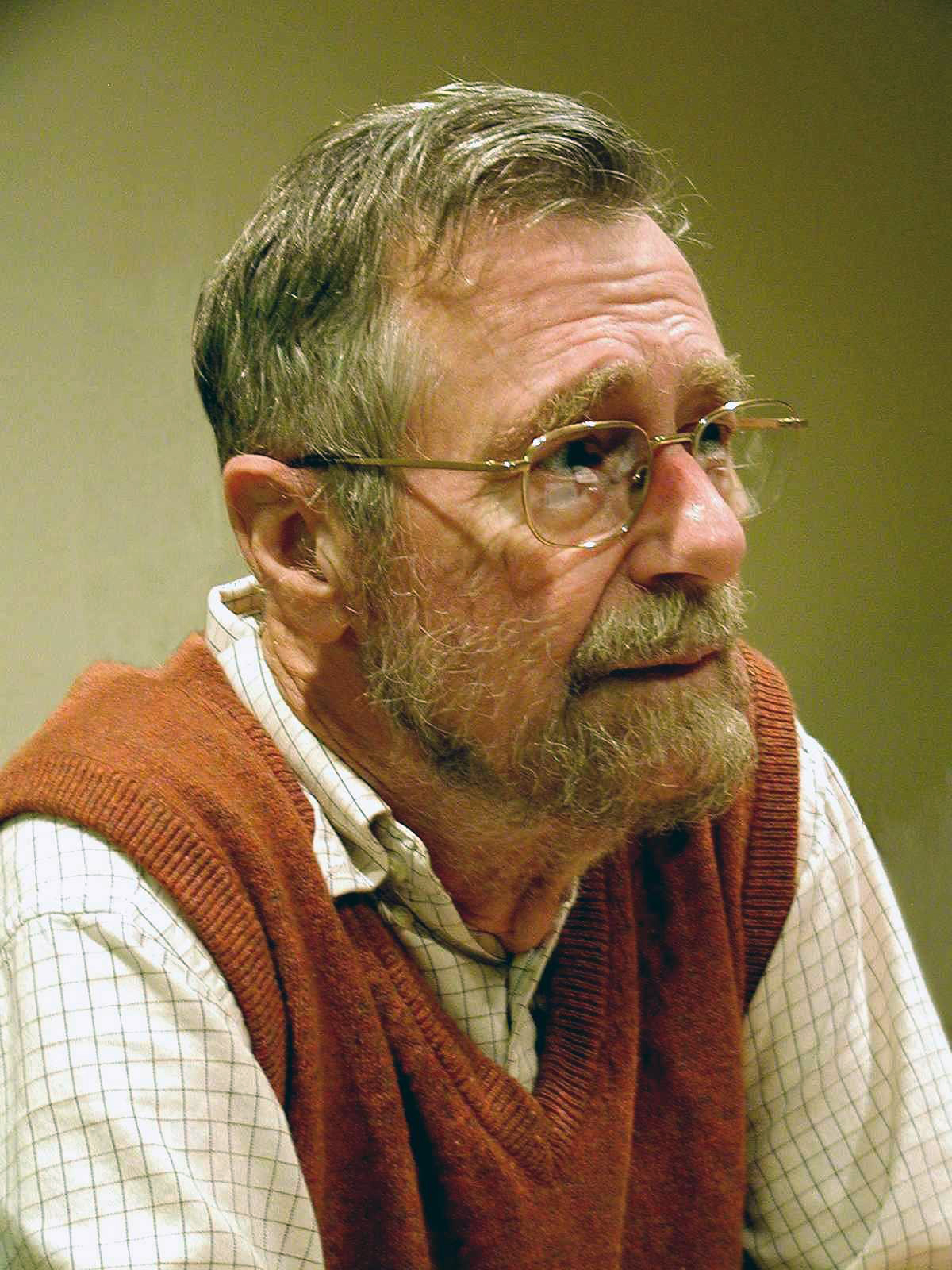
Edsger W. Dijkstra

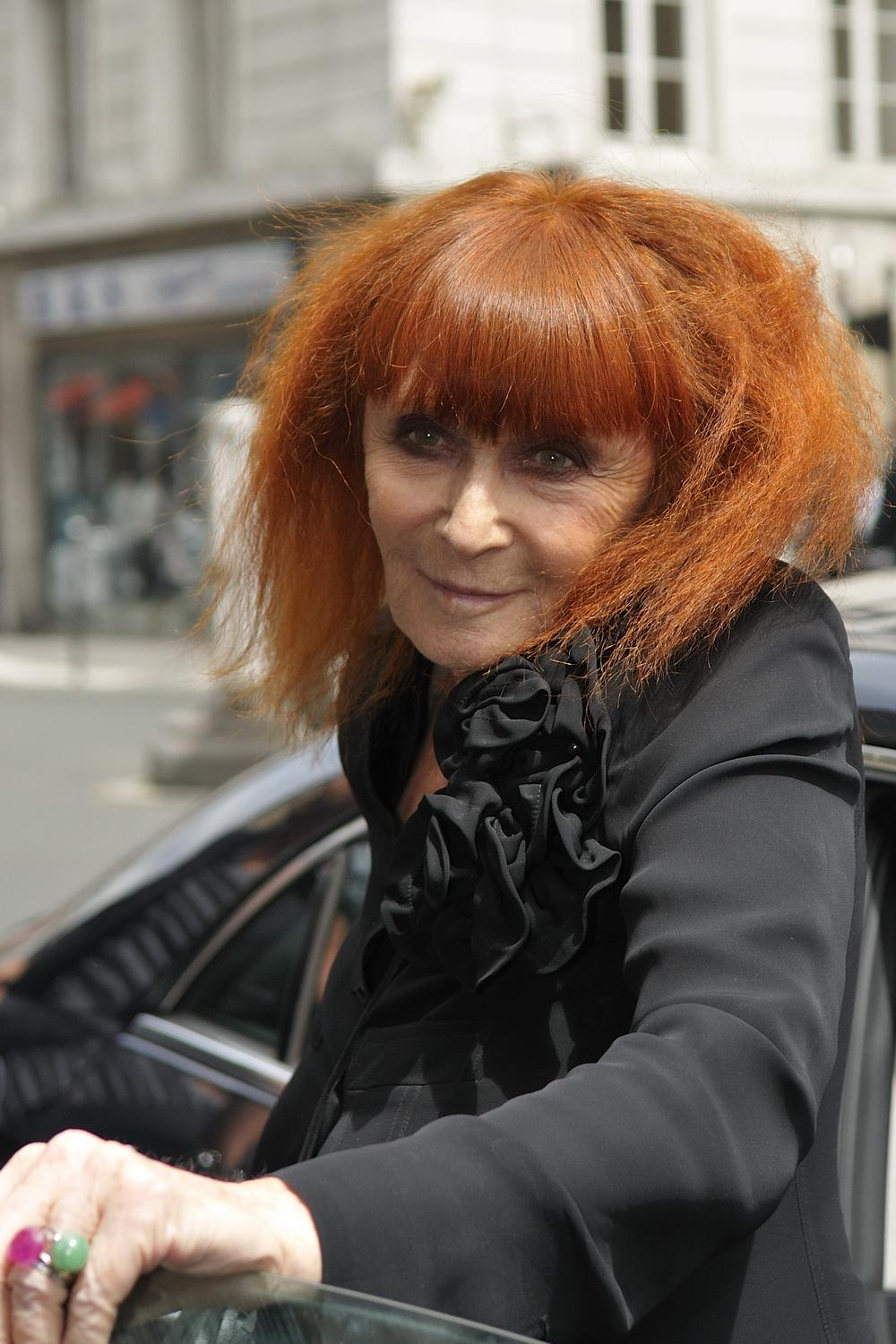
Sonia Rykiel

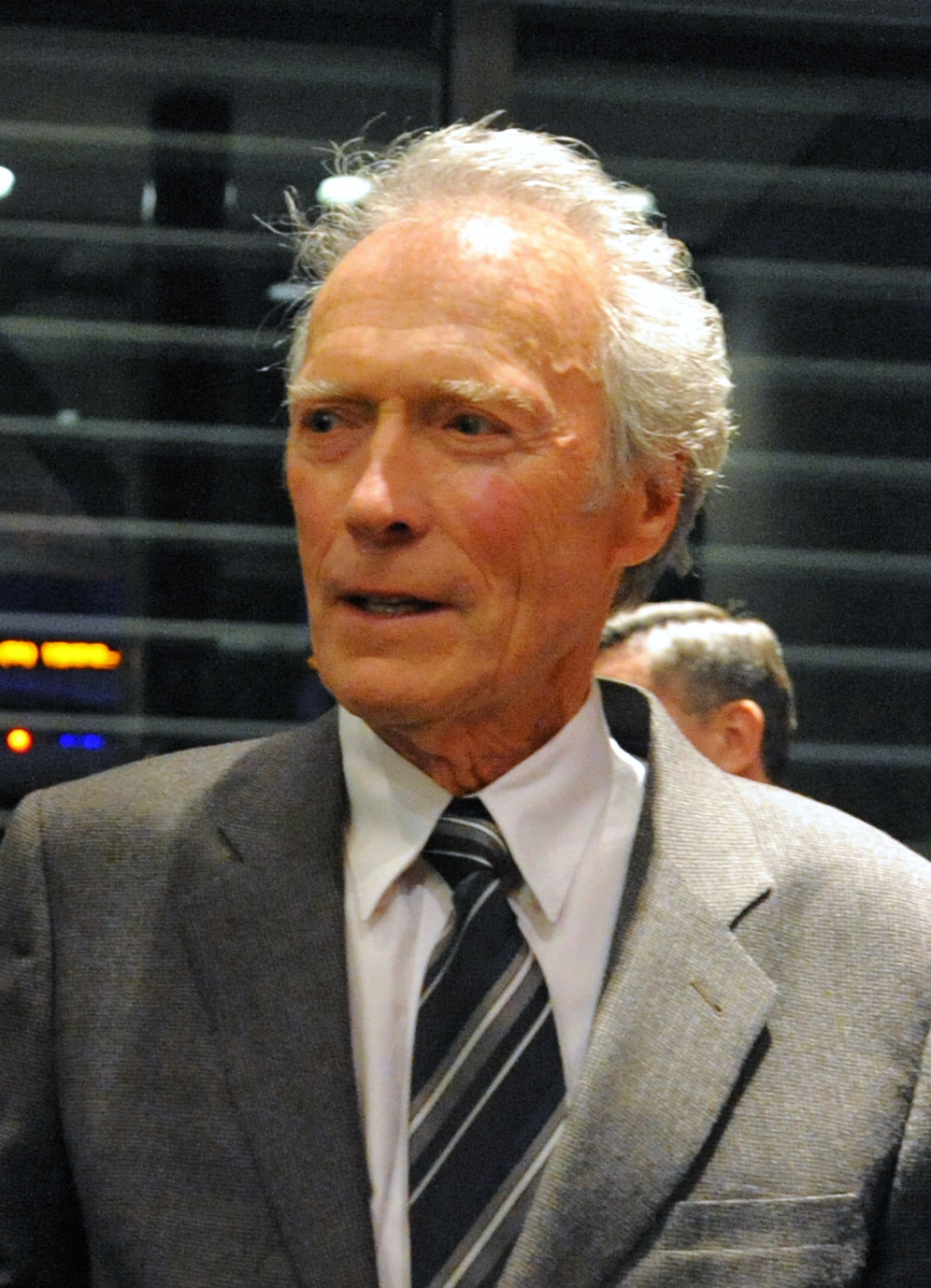
Clint Eastwood

- May 1 – Little Walter, African-American blues singer, musician, and songwriter (d. 1968)
- May 3 – Juan Gelman, Argentine poet, writer (d. 2014)
- May 4 – Roberta Peters, American soprano (d. 2017)
- May 5 – Michael J. Adams, American aviator, aeronautical engineer, and astronaut (d. 1967)
- May 8
  - Heather Harper, Northern Irish soprano (d. 2019)
  - Gary Snyder, American poet, essayist and translator
- May 9 – Joan Sims, English actress (d. 2001)
- May 11 – Edsger W. Dijkstra, Dutch computer scientist (d. 2002)
- May 13
  - Vernon Shaw, 5th president of Dominica (d. 2013)
  - Mike Gravel, American politician, former Senator of Alaska and Presidential candidate (d. 2021)
- May 14 – María Irene Fornés, Cuban-American playwright (d. 2018)
- May 15
  - Jasper Johns, American painter
  - Grace Ogot, Kenyan author, nurse, journalist, politician and diplomat (d. 2015)
- May 17 – María Luisa Mendoza, Mexican journalist, novelist and politician (d. 2018)
- May 19 – Lorraine Hansberry, African-American playwright (d. 1965)
- May 20 – James McEachin, American actor (d. 2025)
- May 21 – Malcolm Fraser, 22nd Prime Minister of Australia (d. 2015)
- May 22
  - Kenny Ball, British jazz trumpeter, singer and bandleader (d. 2013)
  - Harvey Milk, American politician and gay rights activist (d. 1978)
- May 25 – Sonia Rykiel, French fashion designer (d. 2016)
- May 27
  - John Barth, American writer (d. 2024)
  - Muhammad Lafir, Sri Lankan snooker player (d. 1981)
- May 28 – Edward Seaga, Jamaican politician, 5th Prime Minister of Jamaica (d. 2019)
- May 31
  - Clint Eastwood, American actor, director, and producer
  - Ruslan Stratonovich, Russian physicist, engineer (d. 1997)

=== June ===
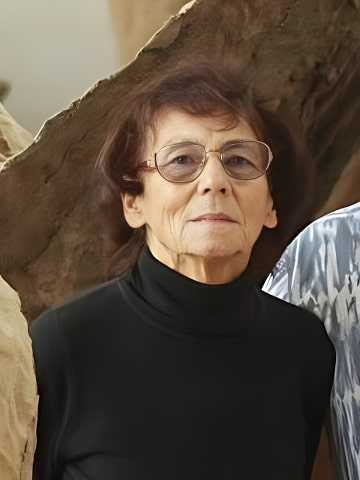
Magdalena Abakanowicz

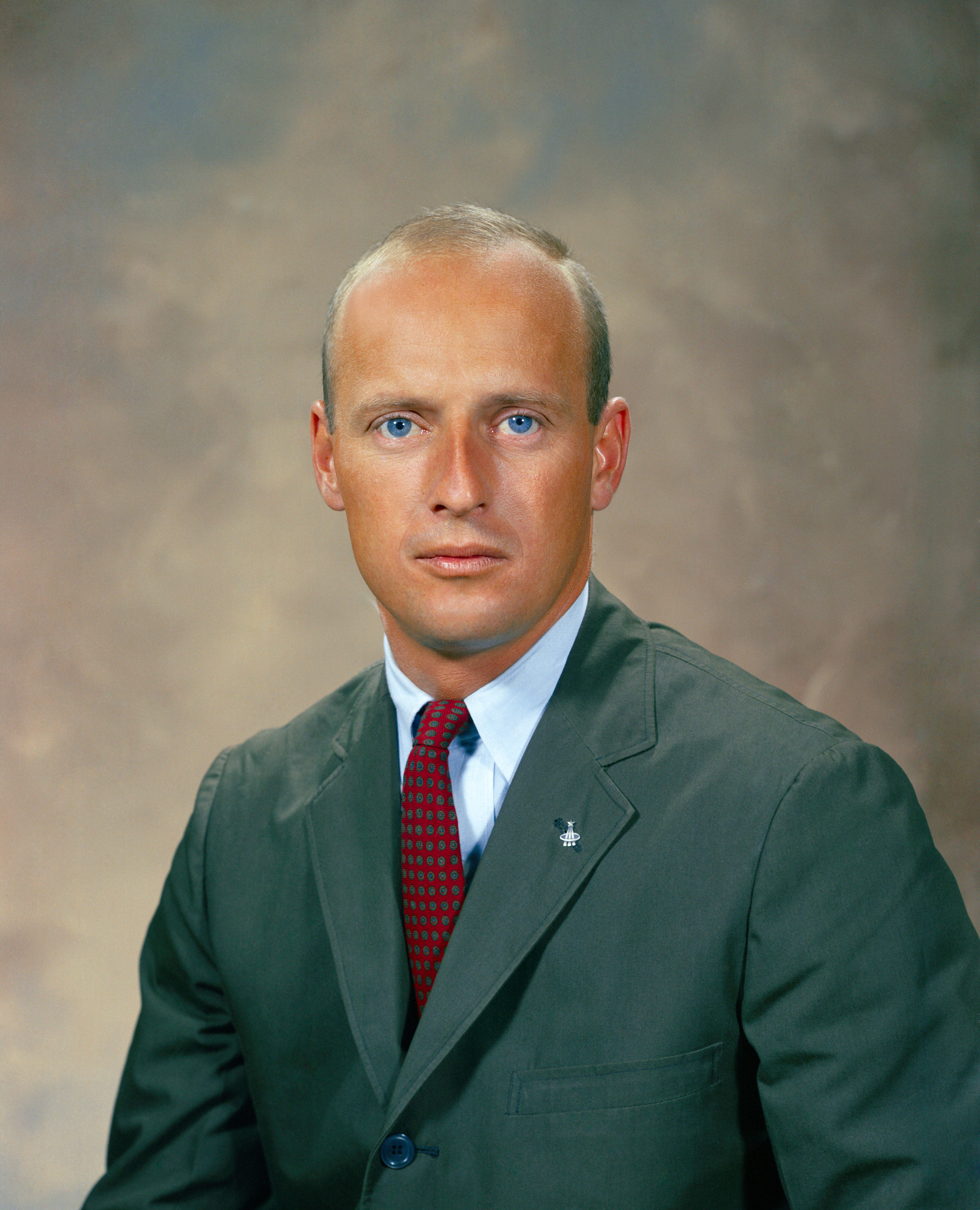
Pete Conrad

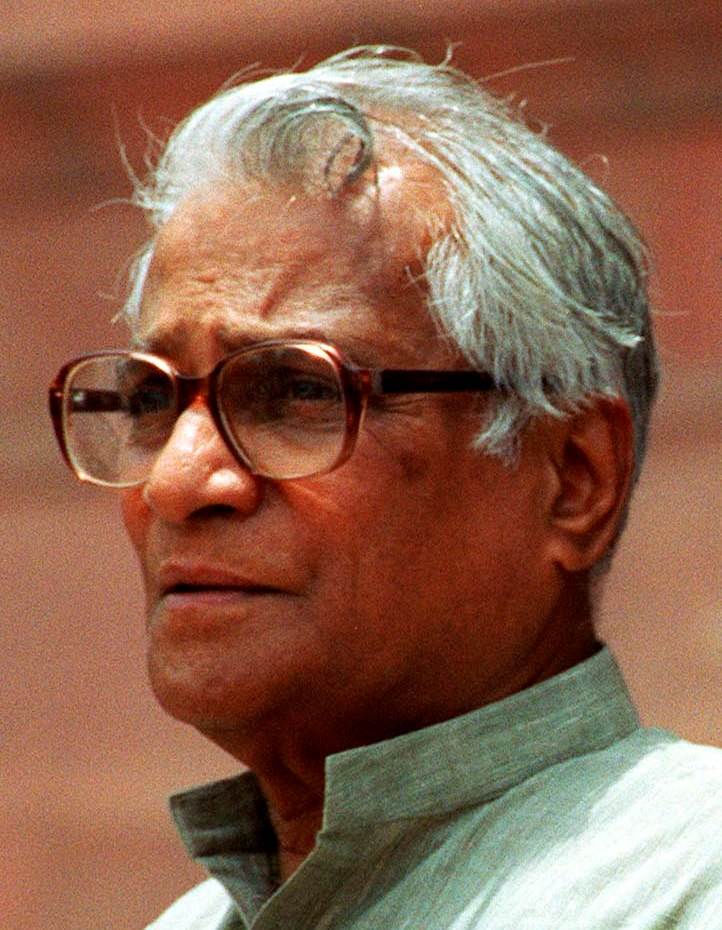
George Fernandes

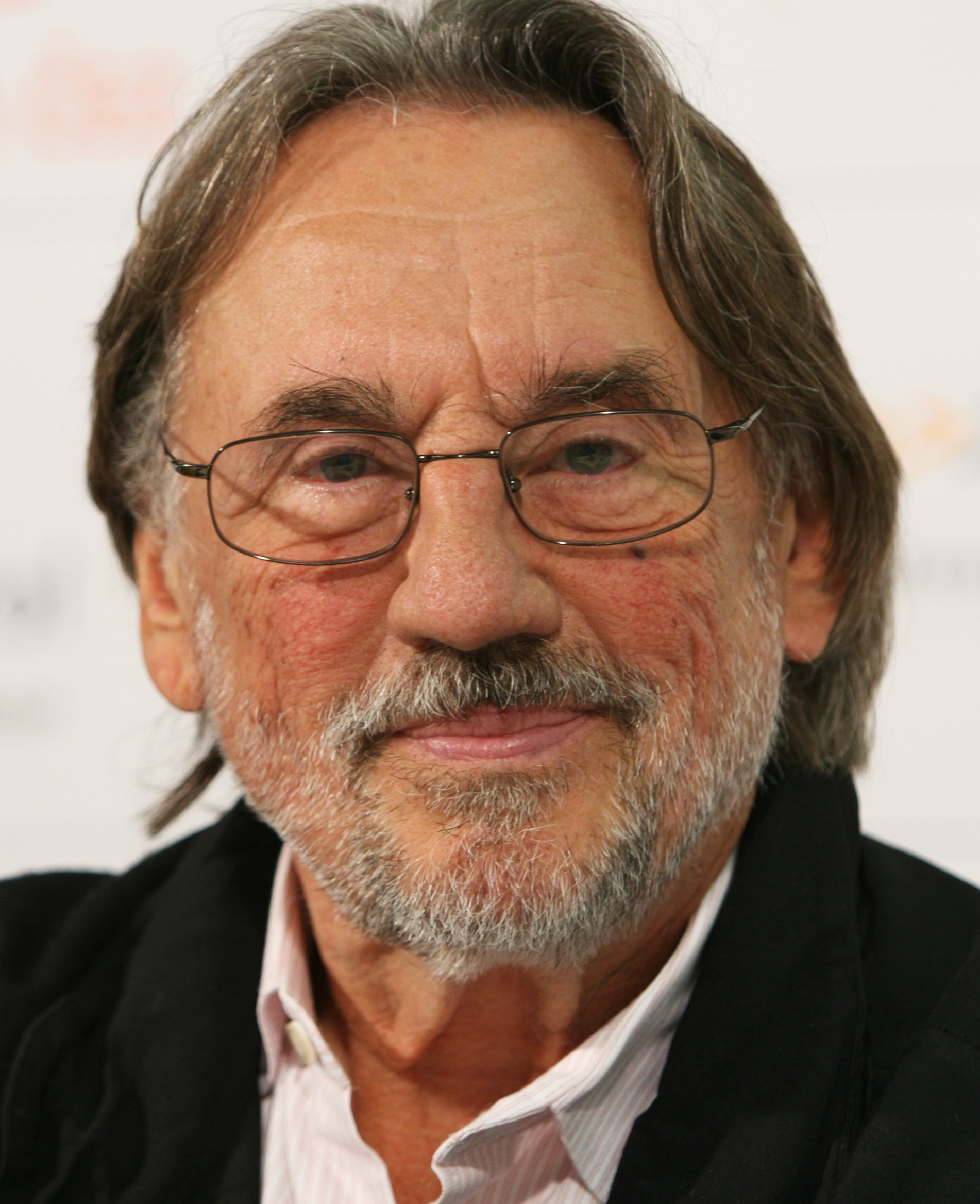
Vilmos Zsigmond

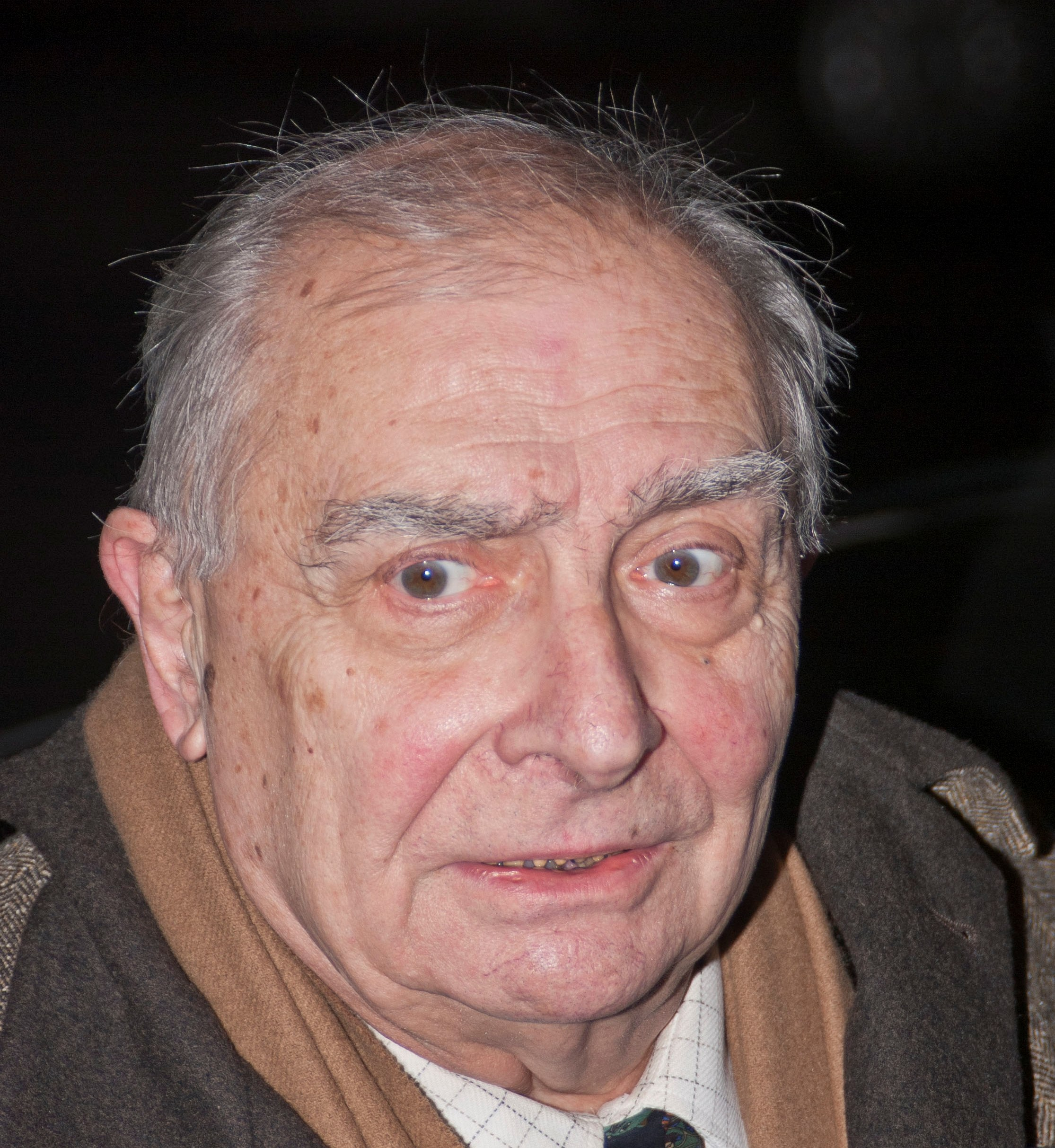
Claude Chabrol

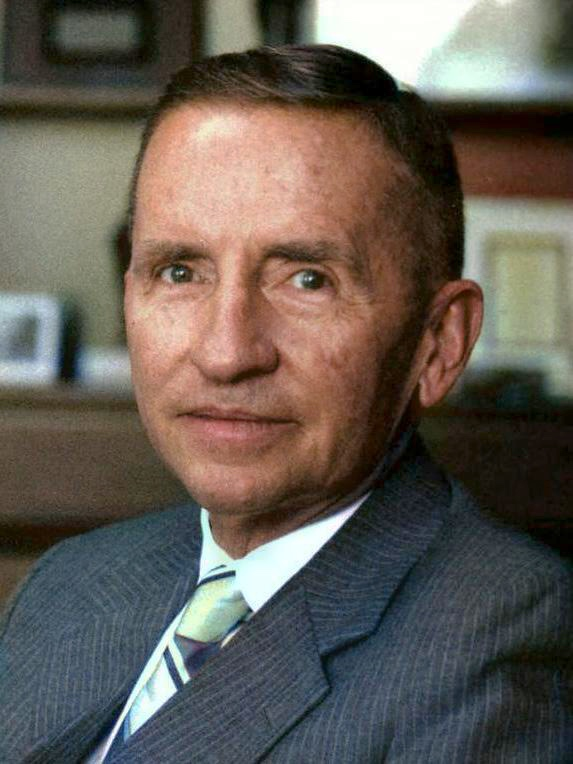
Ross Perot

- June 1 – Edward Woodward, English actor and singer (d. 2009)
- June 2 – Pete Conrad, American astronaut, moonwalker and commander of Apollo 12 (d. 1999)
- June 3
  - Marion Zimmer Bradley, American writer (d. 1999)
  - George Fernandes, Indian politician (d. 2019)
- June 4
  - Morgana King, American jazz singer, actress (d. 2018)
  - Viktor Tikhonov, Soviet ice hockey player and coach (d. 2014)
- June 6 – Frank Tyson, English cricketer (d. 2015)
- June 8 – Robert Aumann, German-born mathematician, recipient of the Nobel Memorial Prize in Economic Sciences
- June 9
  - Barbara, French singer (d. 1997)
  - Jordi Pujol, 126th President of the Government of Catalonia
- June 10
  - Grace Mirabella, American journalist, editor of Vogue 1971–88 (d. 2021)
  - Theo Sommer, German journalist (d. 2022)
- June 11
  - Neale Lavis, Australian equestrian (d. 2019)
  - Charles Rangel, African-American politician (d. 2025)
- June 12
  - Jim Nabors, American actor, musician and comedian (d. 2017)
  - Son Sen, Cambodian politician and war criminal (d. 1997)
- June 16 – Vilmos Zsigmond, Hungarian-American cinematographer (d. 2016)
- June 19 – Gena Rowlands, American actress (d. 2024)
- June 20
  - Magdalena Abakanowicz, Polish sculptor (d. 2017)
  - Juan Alberto Melgar Castro, Honduran military ruler (d. 1987)
- June 21 – Gerald Kaufman, British Labour politician (d. 2017)
- June 22
  - Yuri Artyukhin, Russian cosmonaut (d. 1998)
  - Sa'dun Hammadi, 33rd prime minister of Iraq (d. 2007)
- June 23
  - J. H. Elliott, British historian (d. 2022)
  - Anthony Thwaite, English poet, critic, and academic (d. 2021)
- June 24 – Claude Chabrol, French film director (d. 2010)
- June 26
  - Wolfgang Schwanitz, German Leader of the Office for National Security, Head of the Stasi (d. 2022)
  - Moeenuddin Ahmad Qureshi, Pakistani economist and caretaker prime minister (d. 2016)
- June 27 – Ross Perot, American business magnate, billionaire, politician, and philanthropist (d. 2019)
- June 28
  - William C. Campbell, Irish-American biologist, parasitologist, Nobel Prize laureate
  - Itamar Franco, President of Brazil (d. 2011)
- June 29
  - Robert Evans, American producer (d. 2019)
  - Viola Léger, American-Canadian actress and politician (d. 2023)
- June 30
  - Ignatius Peter VIII Abdalahad, Syrian bishop (d. 2018)
  - Thomas Sowell, American economist and social theorist
  - Ahmed Zaki Yamani, Saudi Arabian politician (d. 2021)

=== July ===
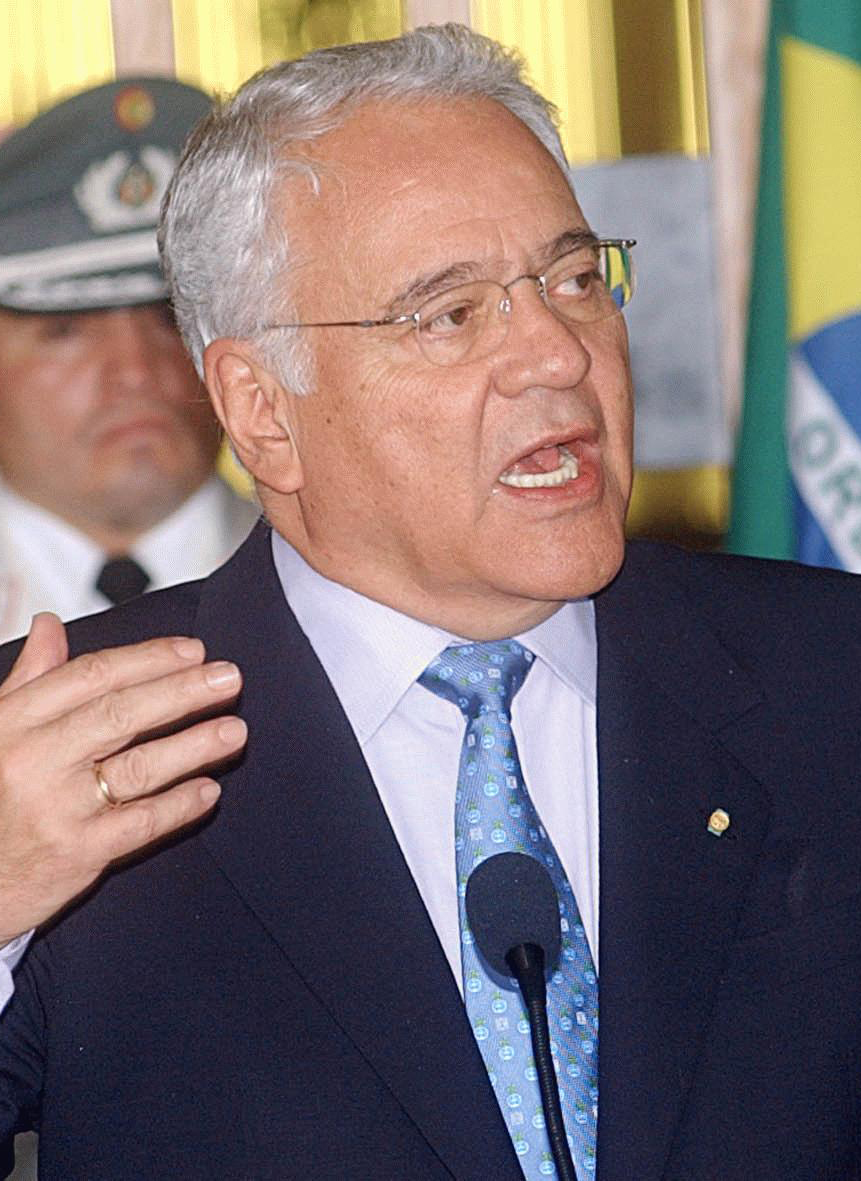
Gonzalo Sánchez de Lozada

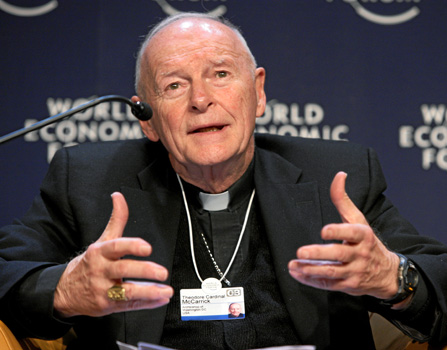
Theodore McCarrick

Biljana Plavšić

- July 1
  - Moustapha Akkad, Syrian-American filmmaker (d. 2005)
  - Gonzalo Sánchez de Lozada, Bolivian politician and businessman
- July 2
  - Sylve Bengtsson, Swedish Olympic footballer (d. 2005)
  - Ahmad Jamal, American jazz pianist and composer (d. 2023)
  - Carlos Menem, President of Argentina (d. 2021)
- July 3
  - Carlos Kleiber, Austrian conductor (d. 2004)
  - Ferdinando Riva, Swiss football forward (d. 2014)
  - N. Venkatachala, Indian judge (d. 2019)
- July 4
  - George Steinbrenner, American businessman and baseball team owner (d. 2010)
  - Yuriy Tyukalov, Russian rower (d. 2018)
- July 6
  - George Armstrong, Canadian professional ice hockey player (d. 2021)
  - Françoise Mallet-Joris, Belgian writer (d. 2016)
  - M. Balamuralikrishna, Indian Carnatic vocalist, multi-instrumentalist, playback singer, composer and actor (d. 2016)
- July 7
  - Theodore McCarrick, American Roman Catholic former cardinal (d. 2025)
  - Biljana Plavšić, Bosnian politician and war criminal (d. 2026)
- July 9 – Slavko Dacevski, Macedonian football player and manager
- July 11
  - Jack Alabaster, New Zealand cricketer (d. 2024)
  - Harold Bloom, American literary critic (d. 2019)
- July 12 – Gordon Pinsent, Canadian actor (d. 2023)
- July 14 – Polly Bergen, American actress (d. 2014)
- July 15
  - Einosuke Akiya, Japanese Buddhist leader
  - Jacques Derrida, Algerian-born French literary critic (d. 2004)
  - Stephen Smale, American mathematician
- July 17
  - Sigvard Ericsson, Swedish speed skater (d. 2019)
  - Ray Galton, English scriptwriter (d. 2018)
  - Sir William Heseltine, Australian Private Secretary to Queen Elizabeth II
- July 19
  - David Rubadiri, Malawian diplomat, academic, poet, playwright and novelist (d. 2018)
  - Elsie Vartanian, American politician, member of the Massachusetts House of Representatives, director of the United States Women's Bureau (d. 2019)
- July 20
  - Alex Sánchez, Costa Rican football player (d. 2025)
  - Oleg Anofriyev, Soviet-Russian actor, singer, songwriter, film director and poet (d. 2018)
- July 21
  - Gene Littler, American professional golfer (d. 2019)
  - Helen Merrill, American jazz vocalist
  - Anand Bakshi, Indian poet/lyricist (d. 2002)
- July 22 – Ferruccio Amendola, Italian actor and voice actor (d. 2001)
- July 24 – Jacqueline Brookes, American actress (d. 2013)
- July 25
  - Murray Chapple, New Zealand cricketer (d. 1985)
  - Maureen Forrester, Canadian contralto (d. 2010)
- July 28
  - Firoza Begum, Bangladeshi singer (d. 2014)
  - Jean Roba, Belgian comics author (d. 2006)

=== August ===
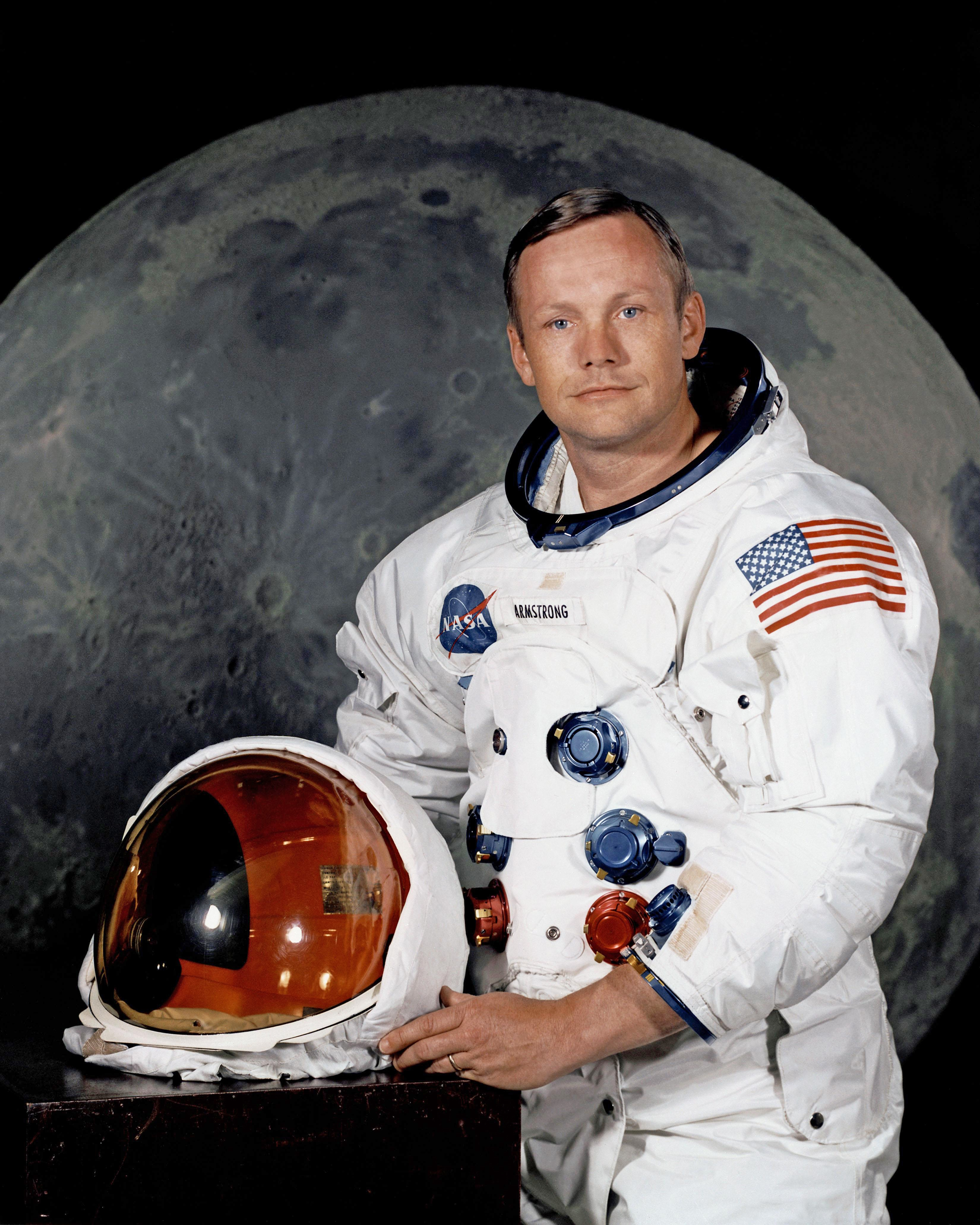
Neil Armstrong

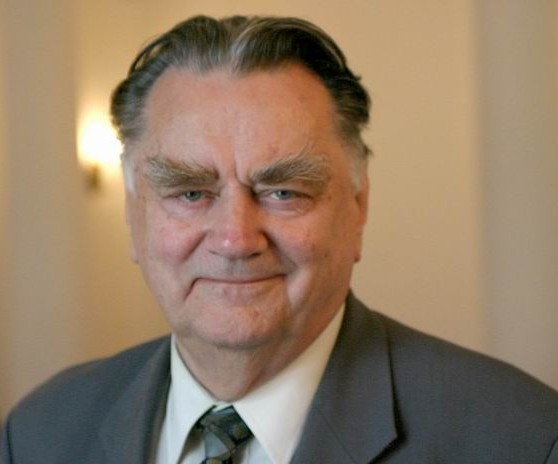
Jan Olszewski

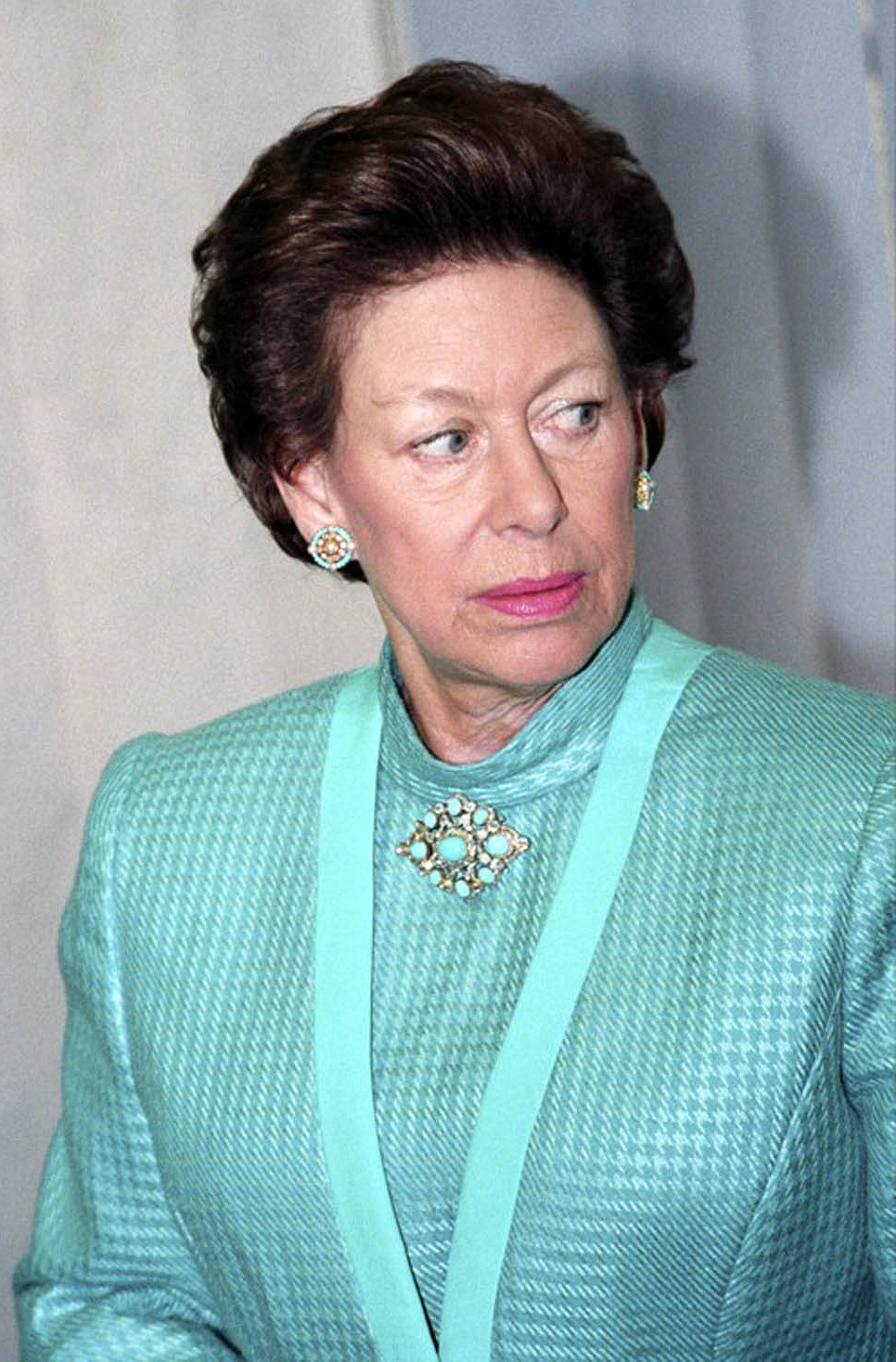
Princess Margaret

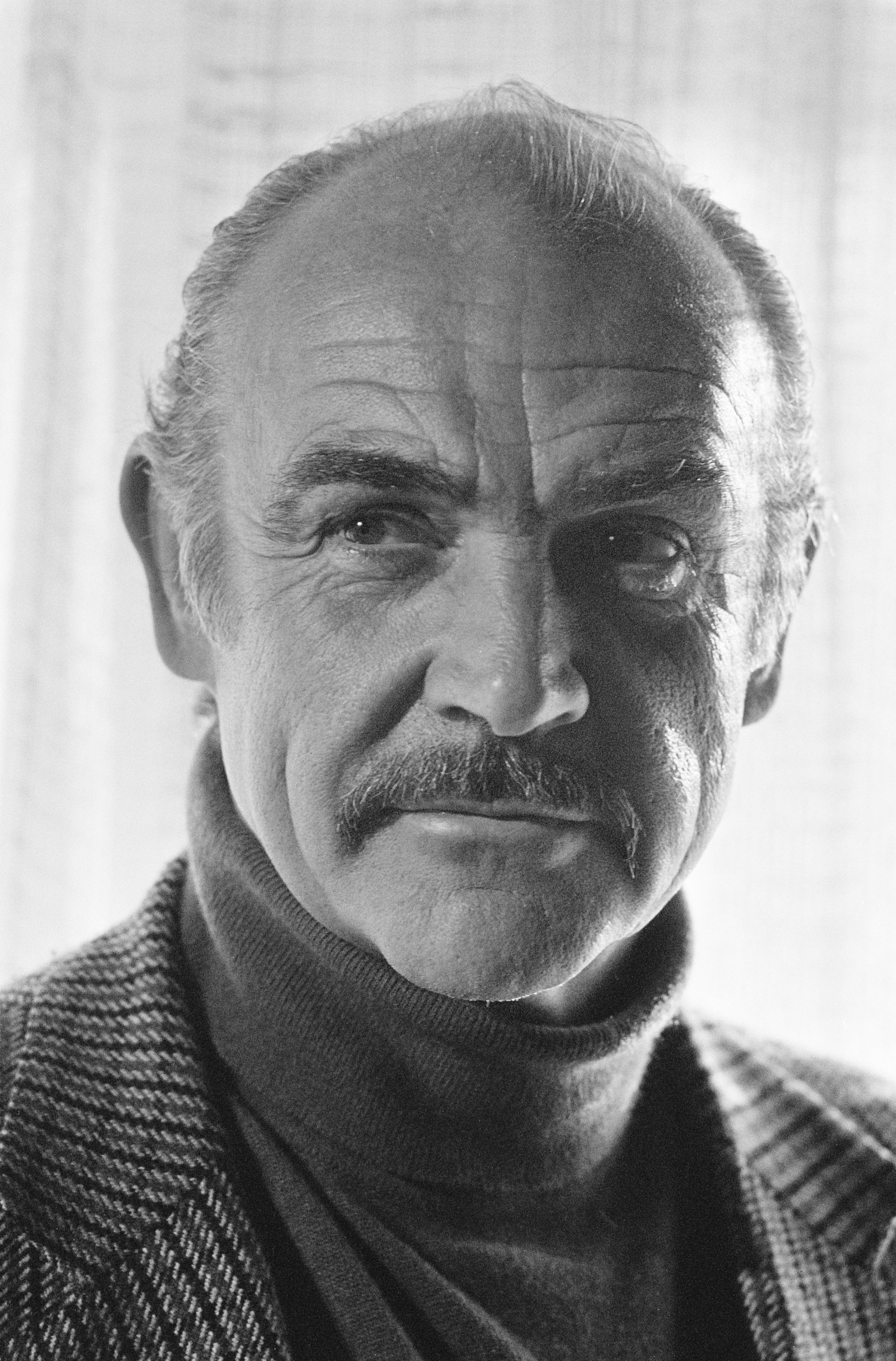
Sir Sean Connery

- August 1
  - Pierre Bourdieu, French sociologist (d. 2002)
  - Lawrence Eagleburger, United States Secretary of State (d. 2011)
  - Károly Grósz, 51st prime minister of Hungary (d. 1996)
  - Geoffrey Holder, Trinidadian-American dancer, choreographer and actor (d. 2014)
- August 4
  - Enrico Castellani, Italian painter (d. 2017)
  - Ali al-Sistani, Iranian Shia Ayatollah
- August 5 – Neil Armstrong, American astronaut, first human to set foot on the Moon, commander of Apollo 11 (d. 2012)
- August 6 – Abbey Lincoln, American singer (d. 2010)
- August 9
  - Carmen Balcells, Spanish literary agent (d. 2015)
  - Jacques Parizeau, French-Canadian politician (d. 2015)
- August 10 – Luigi De Filippo, Italian actor (d. 2018)
- August 12 – George Soros, Hungarian-born investor
- August 14 – Liz Fraser, English actress (d. 2018)
- August 15 – Tom Mboya, Kenyan trade unionist, educationist, Pan Africanist, author and independence activist (probable; d. 1969)
- August 16
  - Robert Culp, American actor (d. 2010)
  - Leslie Manigat, 34th President of Haiti (d. 2014)
  - Flor Silvestre, Mexican singer, actress and equestrienne (d. 2020)
  - Tony Trabert, American tennis player and commentator (d. 2021)
- August 17 – Ted Hughes, English poet (d. 1998)
- August 19 – Frank McCourt, Irish-American writer (d. 2009)
- August 20 – Jan Olszewski, 3rd Prime Minister of Poland (d. 2019)
- August 21 – Princess Margaret, Countess of Snowdon (d. 2002)
- August 22 – Gylmar dos Santos Neves, Brazilian footballer (d. 2013)
- August 23 – Michel Rocard, Prime Minister of France (d. 2016)
- August 24 – Sultanah Bahiyah, Sultanah of Kedah (d. 2003)
- August 25
  - Sir Sean Connery, Scottish actor (James Bond) (d. 2020)
  - Georgiy Daneliya, Russian film director and screenwriter (d. 2019)
- August 27 – Gholamreza Takhti, Iranian wrestler (d. 1968)
- August 28
  - Windsor Davies, Welsh actor (d. 2019)
  - Ben Gazzara, American actor (d. 2012)
  - Irinej, Serbian Patriarch, 45th Patriarch of the Serbian Orthodox Church (d. 2020)
- August 30
  - Warren Buffett, American billionaire entrepreneur
  - Paul Poupard, French cardinal

=== September ===
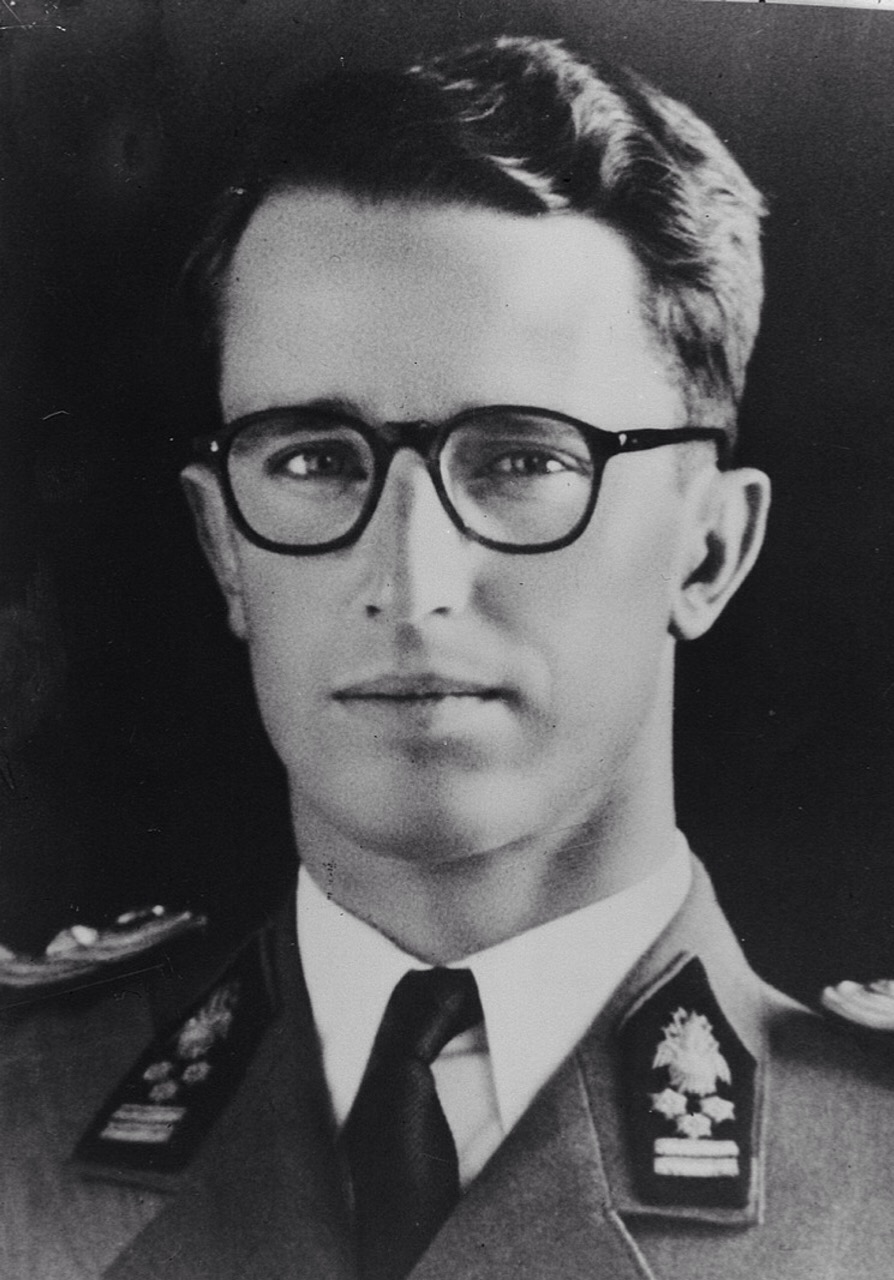
Baudouin I of Belgium

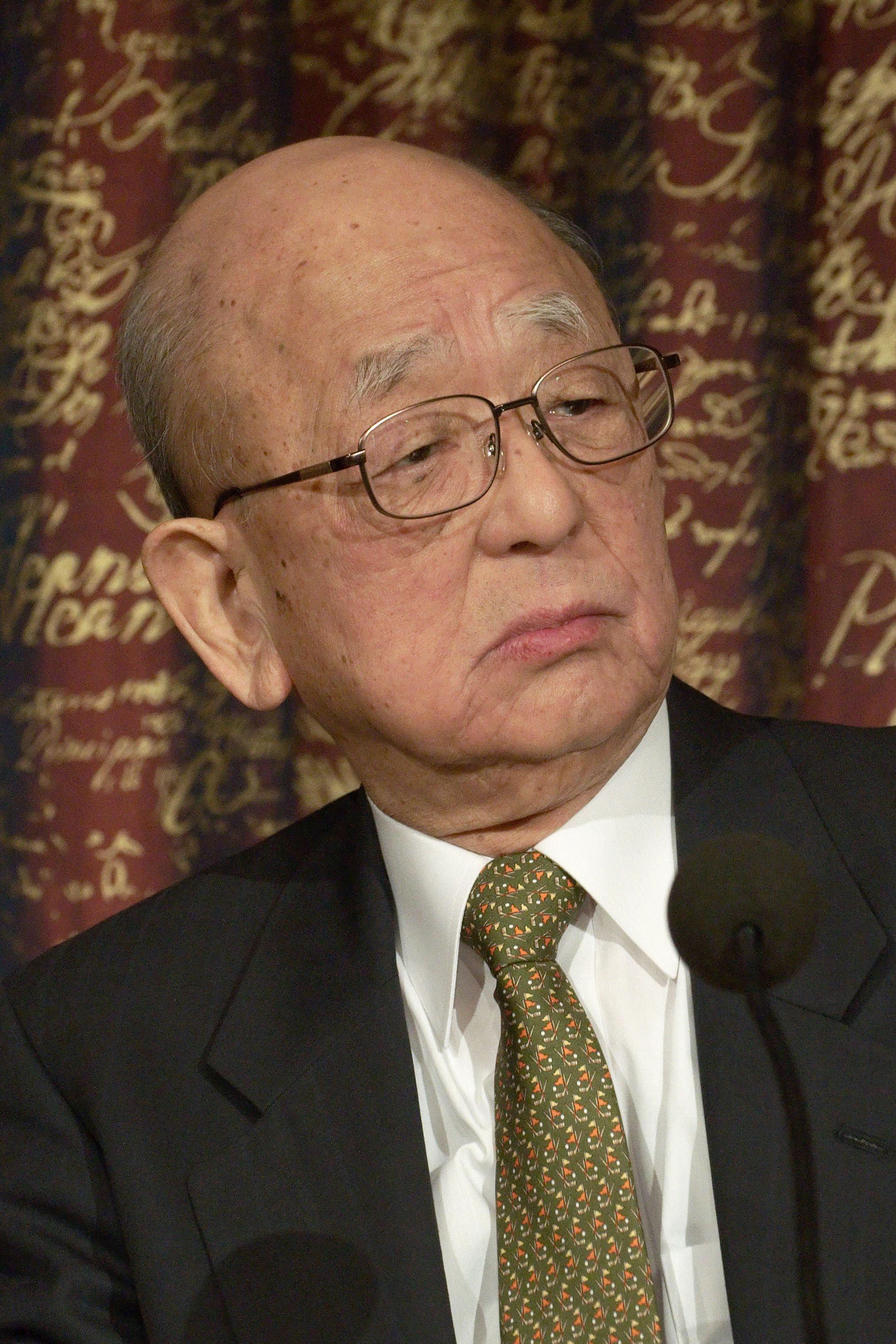
Akira Suzuki

- September 1 – Charles Correa, Indian architect (d. 2015)
- September 3 – Cherry Wilder, New Zealand novelist (d. 2002)
- September 6 – Salvatore De Giorgi, Italian cardinal
- September 7
  - King Baudouin I of Belgium (d. 1993)
  - Sonny Rollins, African-American jazz saxophonist (d. 2026)
  - Yuan Longping, Academician of the Chinese Academy of Engineering and an expert in hybrid rice (d. 2021)
- September 8
  - Mario Adorf, German actor and writer (d. 2026)
  - Jeannette Altwegg, English figure skater (d. 2021)
- September 9 – Frank Lucas, African-American drug trafficker (d. 2019)
- September 11 – Renzo Montagnani, Italian actor (d. 1997)
- September 12 – Akira Suzuki, Japanese chemist, Nobel Prize laureate
- September 13 – Jimmy McLane, American Olympic swimmer (d. 2020)
- September 16 – Anne Francis, American actress (d. 2011)
- September 17
  - Marie-Thérèse Houphouët-Boigny, First Lady of Ivory Coast
  - David Huddleston, American actor (The Big Lebowski) (d. 2016)
  - Edgar Mitchell, American astronaut (d. 2016)
  - Thomas P. Stafford, American astronaut (d. 2024)
- September 20 – Kenneth Mopeli, Chief Minister of QwaQwa bantustan (d. 2014)
- September 23 – Ray Charles, African-American singer, musician and actor (d. 2004)
- September 24 – John Young, American astronaut (d. 2018)
- September 25
  - Elsa Aguirre, Mexican actress (d. 2026)
  - Shel Silverstein, American author, poet and humorist (d. 1999)
- September 26
  - Philip Bosco, American actor (d. 2018)
  - Alice Harnoncourt, Austrian violinist (d. 2022)
  - Fritz Wunderlich, German tenor singer (d. 1966)
- September 29
  - Colin Dexter, English detective fiction writer (d. 2017)
  - Richard Bonynge, Australian pianist and conductor

=== October ===
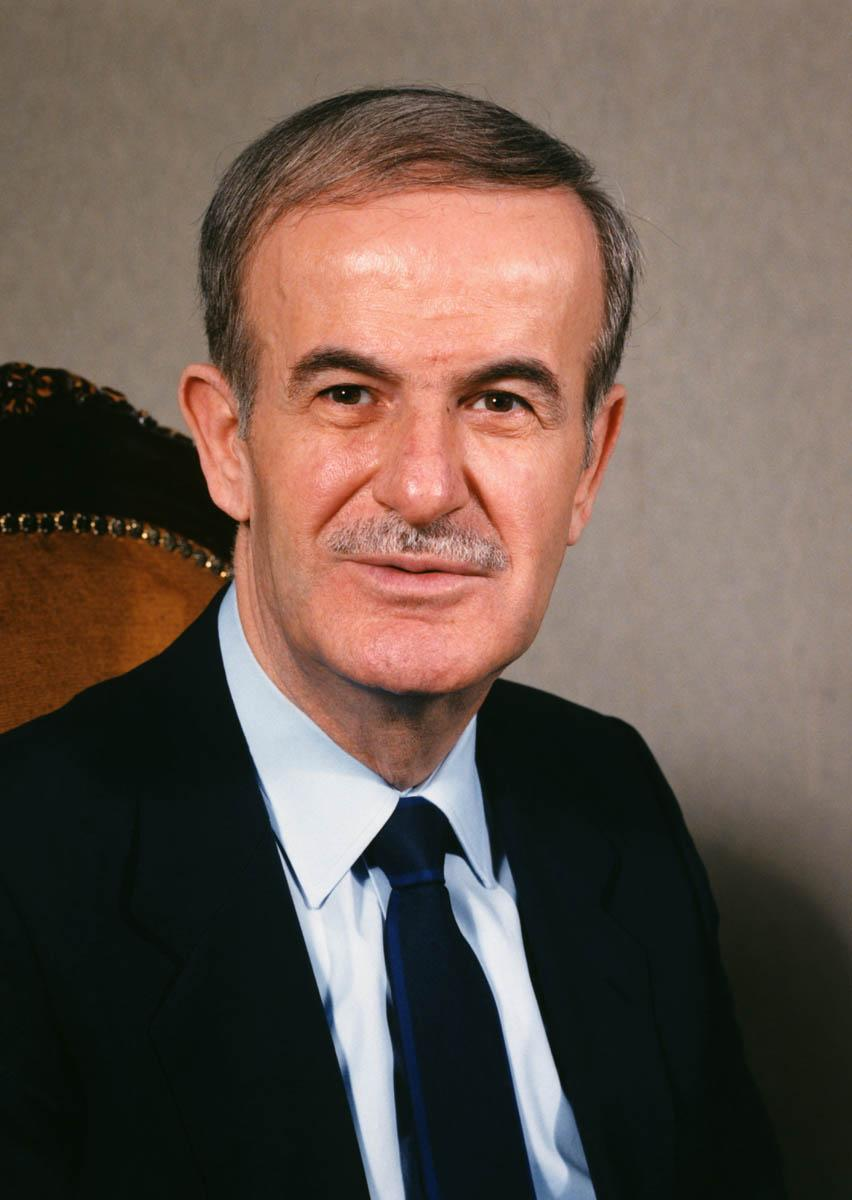
Hafez al-Assad

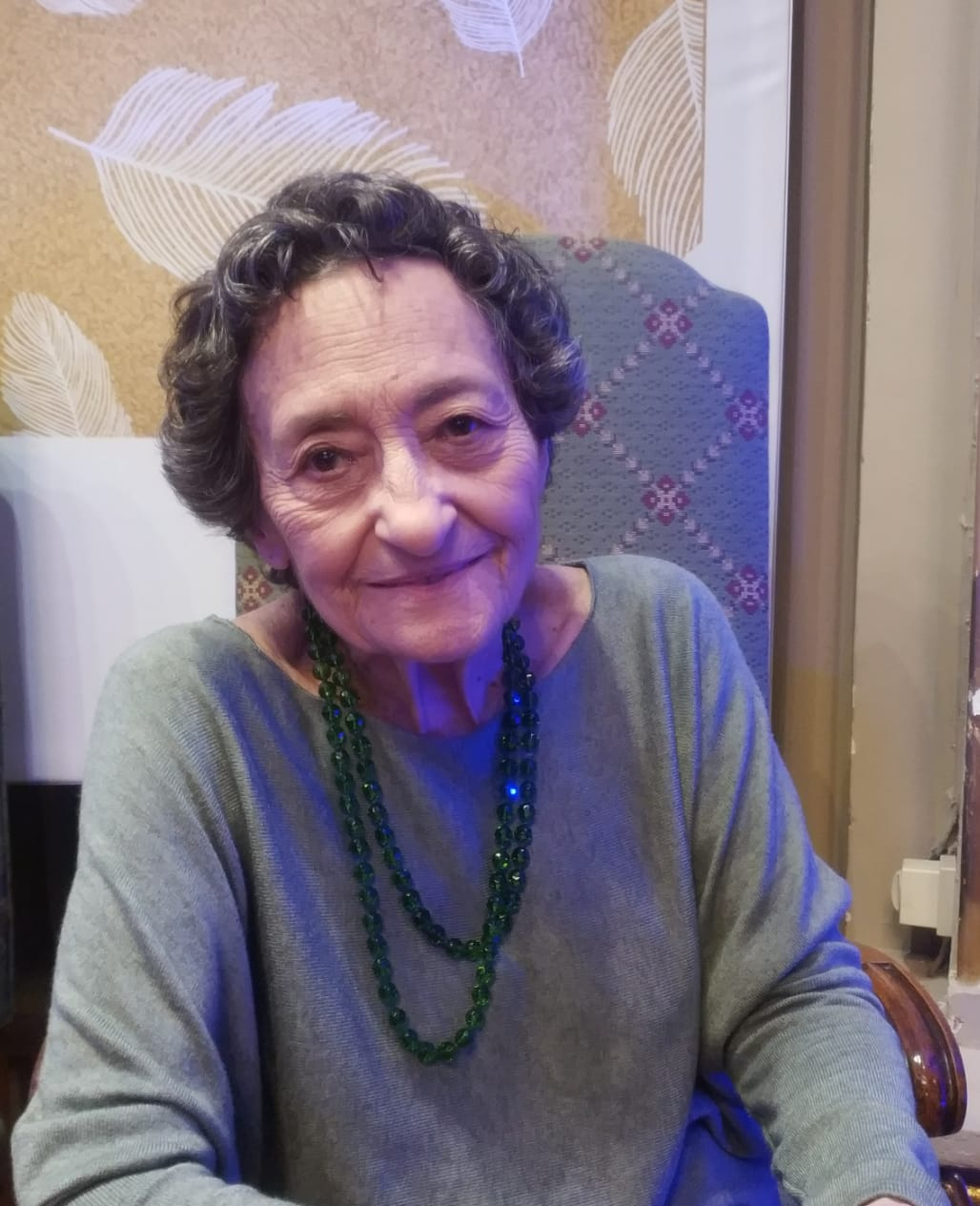
Francisca Aguirre

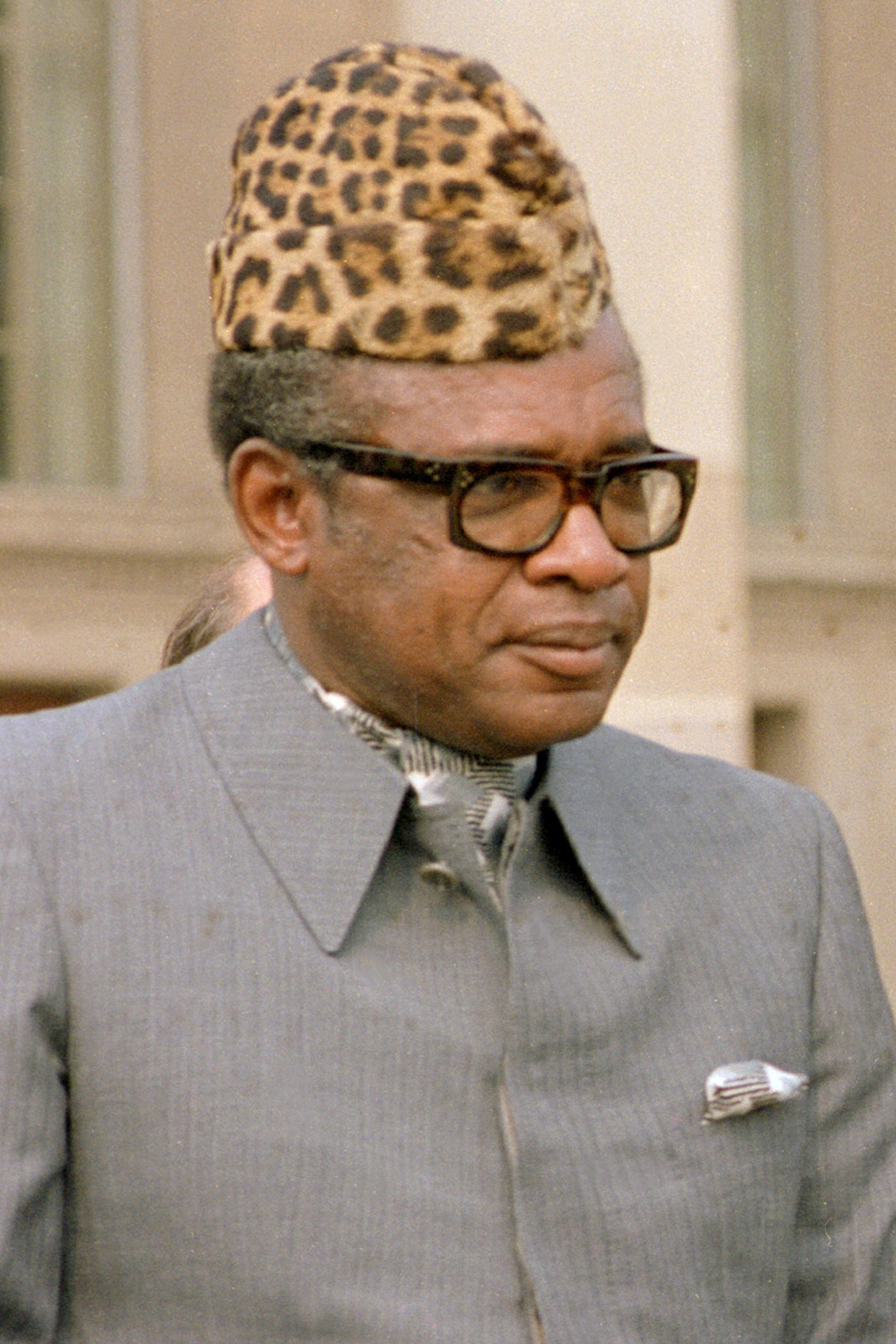
Mobutu Sese Seko

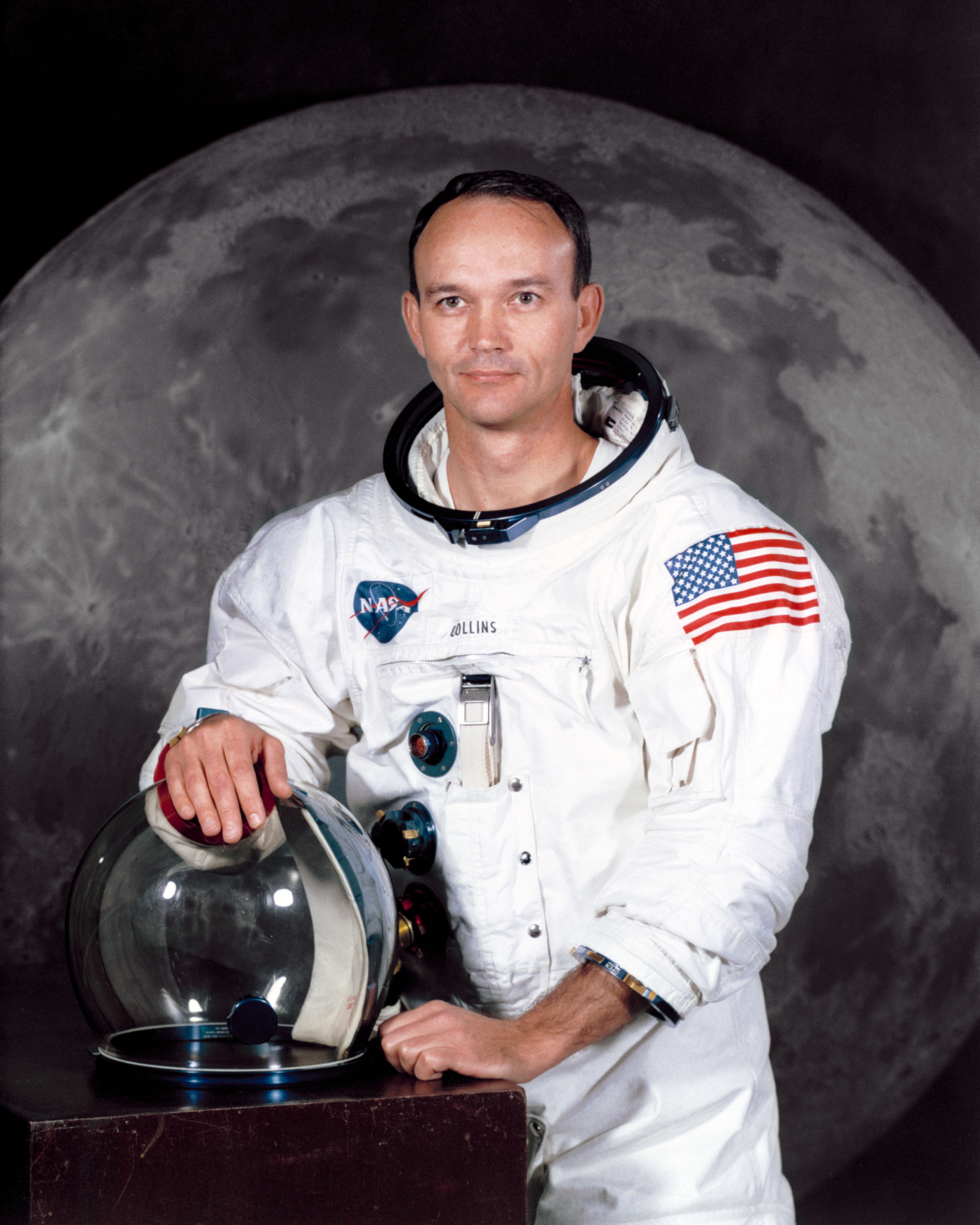
Michael Collins

- October 1
  - Richard Harris, Irish actor, singer (d. 2002)
  - Philippe Noiret, French actor (d. 2006)
- October 2 – Dave Barrett, Canadian politician (d. 2018)
- October 4 – Andrej Marinc, Slovenian politician (d. 2025)
- October 5
  - Pavel Popovich, Soviet cosmonaut (d. 2009)
  - Reinhard Selten, German economist, Nobel Prize laureate (d. 2016)
- October 6
  - Hafez al-Assad, President of Syria (d. 2000)
  - Richie Benaud, Australian cricketer and commentator (d. 2015)
- October 8 – Tōru Takemitsu, Japanese composer (d. 1996)
- October 10
  - Yves Chauvin, Belgian-born chemist, Nobel Prize laureate (d. 2015)
  - Harold Pinter, English playwright, Nobel Prize laureate (d. 2008)
- October 11 – A. Q. M. Badruddoza Chowdhury, 13th President of Bangladesh (d. 2024)
- October 14
  - Schafik Handal, Salvadoran politician (d. 2006)
  - Mobutu Sese Seko, President of Democratic Republic of the Congo (d. 1997)
- October 17 – Robert Atkins, American nutritionist (d. 2003)
- October 18 – Frank Carlucci, American politician (d. 2018)
- October 19 – Ron Joyce, Canadian businessman (d. 2019)
- October 21 – Ivan Silayev, Soviet and Russian politician (d. 2023)
- October 24
  - Ahmad Shah of Pahang, Yang di-Pertuan Agong of Malaysia (d. 2019)
  - The Big Bopper (J.P. Richardson), American singer (d. 1959)
- October 27 – Francisca Aguirre, Spanish poet (d. 2019)
- October 28 – Bernie Ecclestone, English motor racing tycoon
- October 29
  - Omara Portuondo, Cuban singer and dancer
  - Niki de Saint Phalle, French artist (d. 2002)
- October 30
  - Clifford Brown, American jazz trumpeter (d. 1956)
  - Timothy Findley, Canadian author (d. 2002)
- October 31 – Michael Collins, American astronaut (d. 2021)

=== November ===
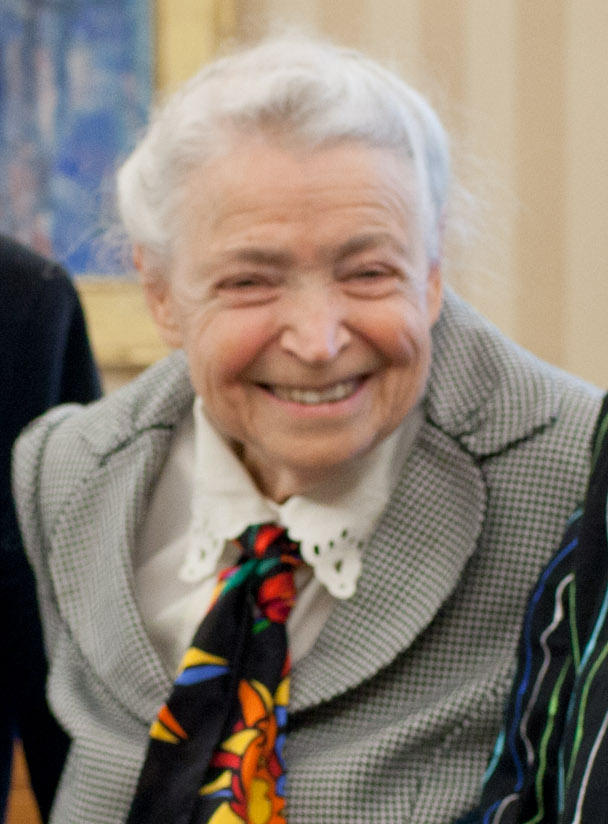
Mildred Dresselhaus

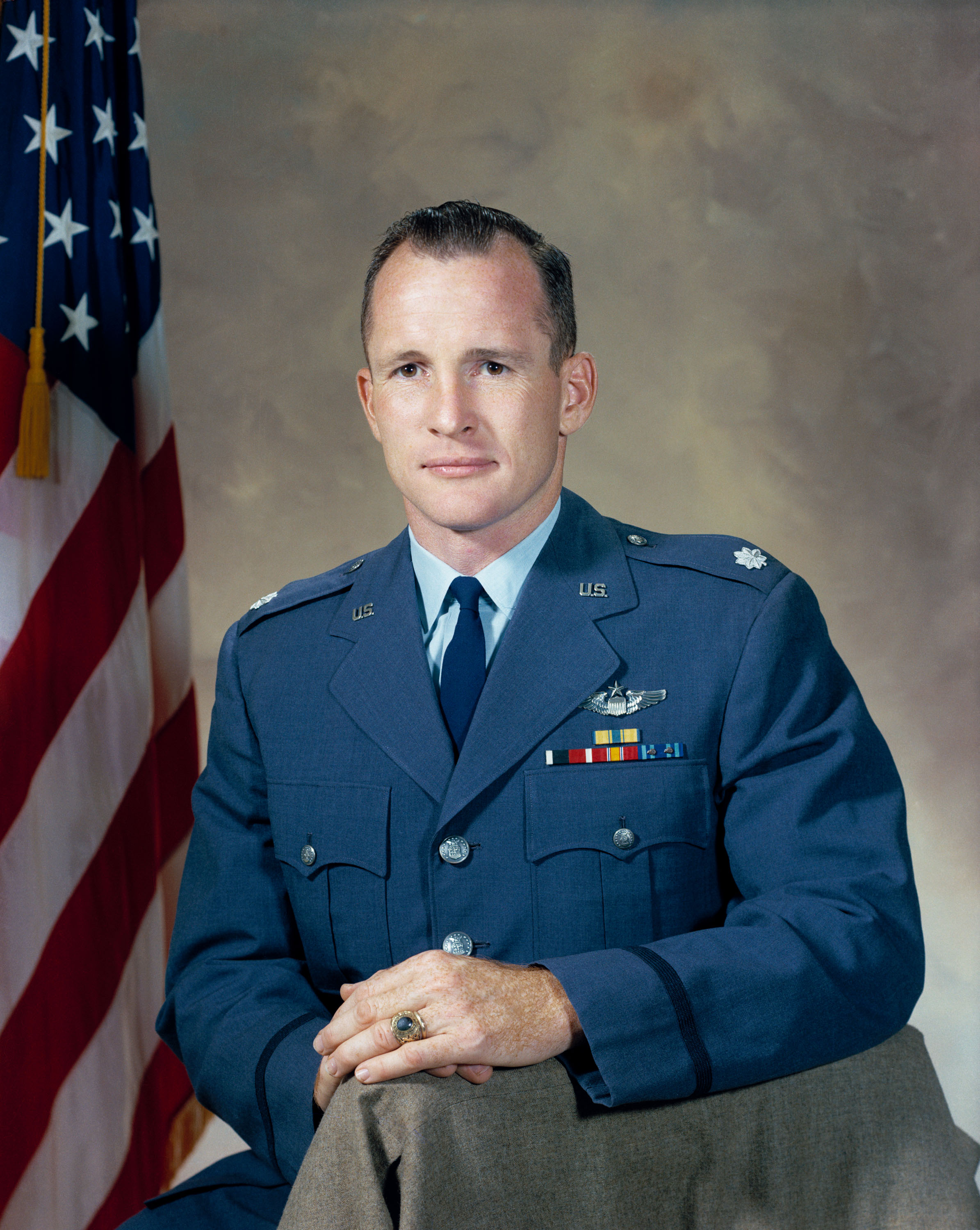
Ed White

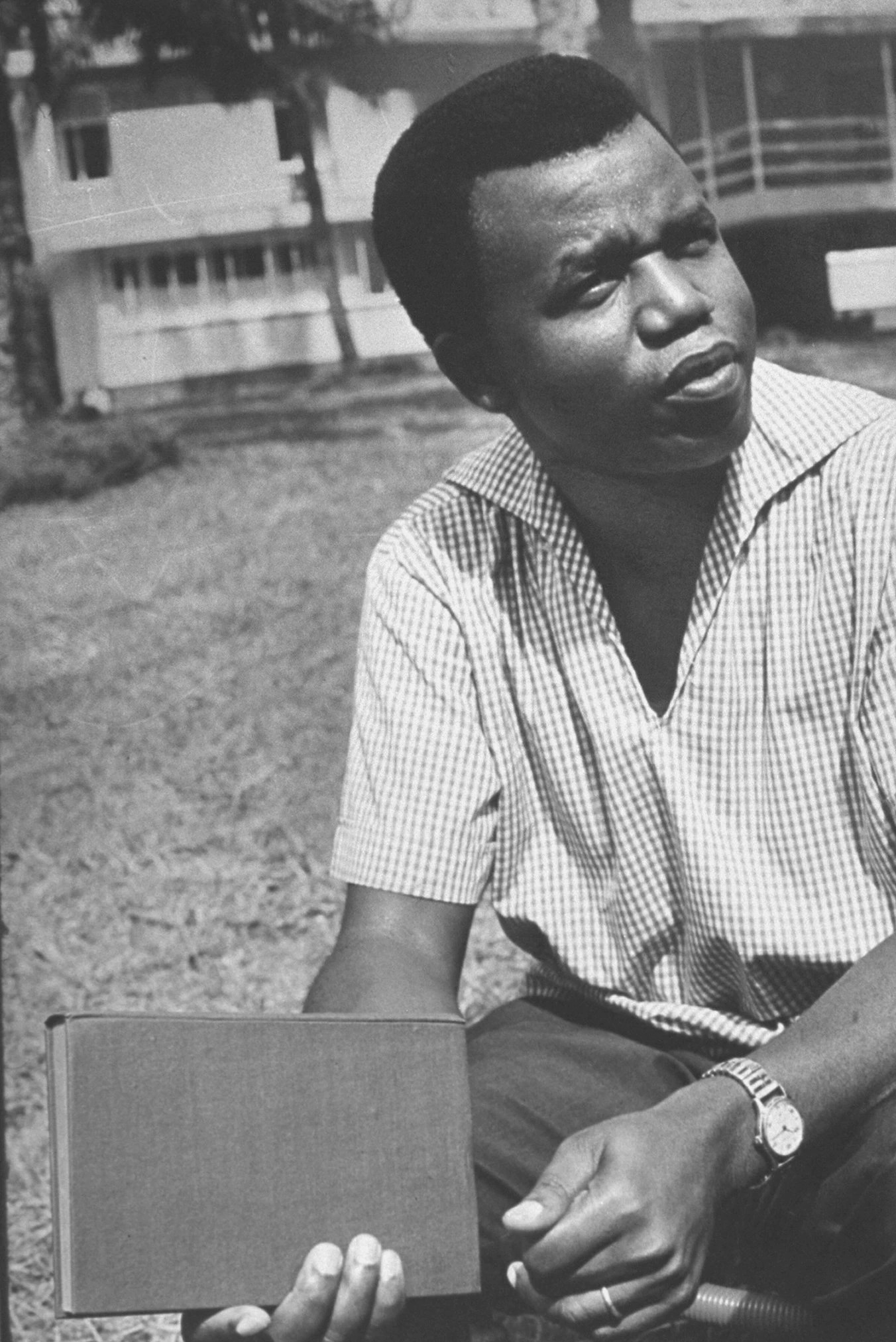
Chinua Achebe

- November 1 – John Scott, English composer
- November 5
  - Hans Mommsen, German historian (d. 2015)
  - Ed Badger, Basketball coach
- November 11
  - Mildred Dresselhaus, American scientist and educator (d. 2017)
  - Mabandla Dlamini, 3rd prime minister of Swaziland (d. 2025)
  - Alevtina Kolchina, Soviet Olympic cross-country skier (d. 2022)
- November 13
  - Richard A. Falk, American academic
  - Fred R. Harris, American politician and United States Senator from Oklahoma, 1964 to 1973 (d. 2024)
- November 14
  - Monique Mercure, Canadian actress (d. 2020)
  - Jānis Pujats, Latvian cardinal, Archbishop of Riga
  - Ed White, American astronaut (d. 1967)
- November 15 – J. G. Ballard, English writer (d. 2009)
- November 16
  - Chinua Achebe, Nigerian writer (d. 2013)
  - Salvatore Riina ("Toto"), Italian multiple murderer (d. 2017)
- November 17 – Bob Mathias, American athlete (d. 2006)
- November 19 – Christian Schwarz-Schilling, Austrian-German politician and philanthropist (d. 2026)
- November 20 – Choe Yong-rim, North Korean politician
- November 22 – Owen Garriott, American astronaut (d. 2019)
- November 24 – Inge Feltrinelli, German-Italian publisher, photographer (d. 2018)
- November 26 – Berthold Leibinger, German engineer, entrepreneur and philanthropist (d. 2018)
- November 29 – David Goldblatt, South African photographer (d. 2018)
- November 30 – G. Gordon Liddy, American organizer of the Watergate burglaries (d. 2021)

=== December ===
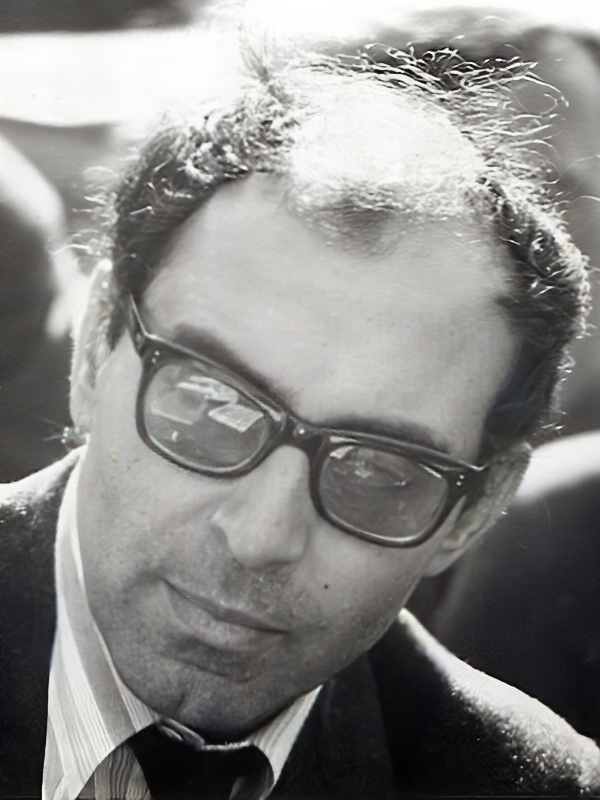
Jean-Luc Godard

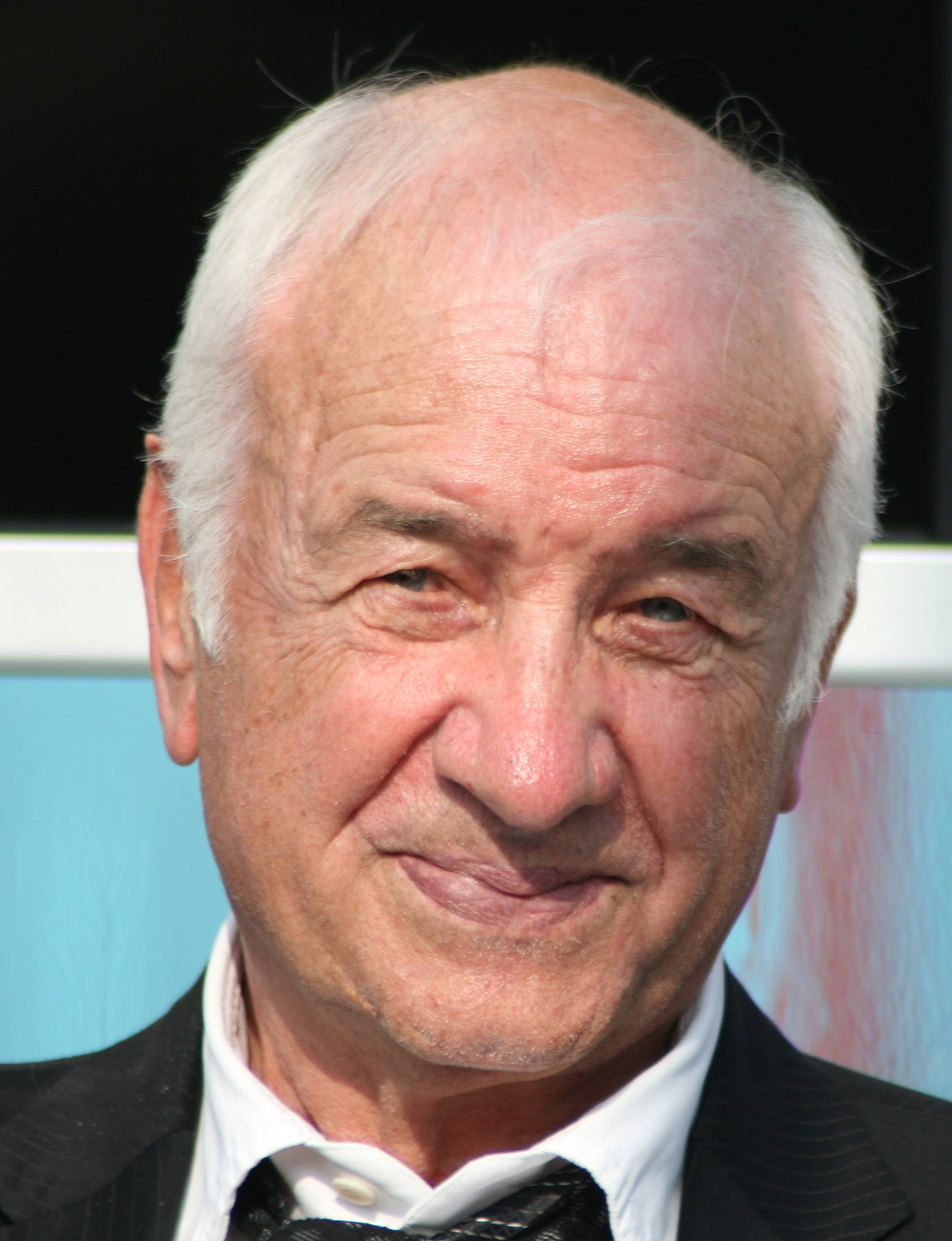
Armin Mueller-Stahl

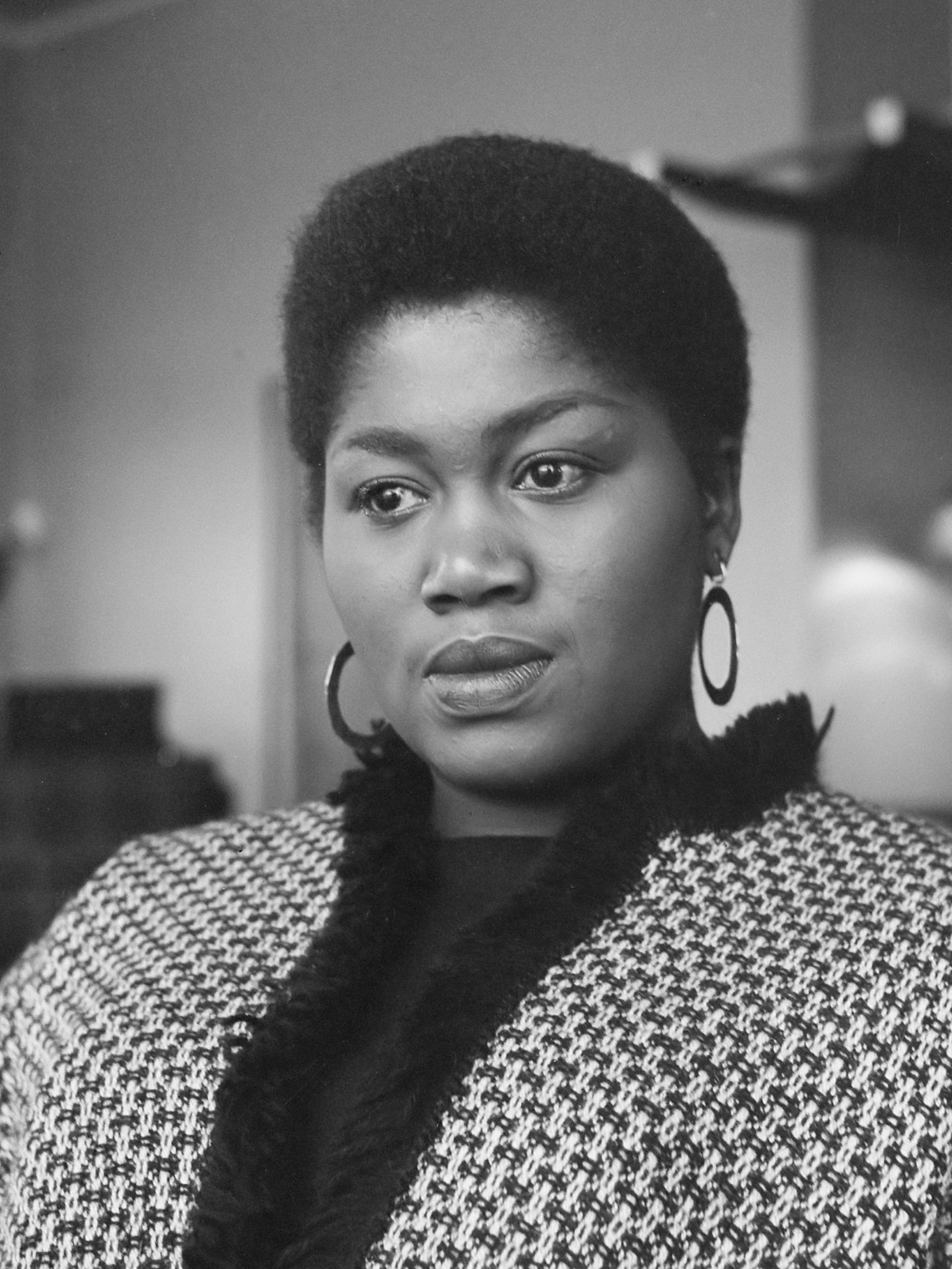
Odetta

- December 2 – Gary Becker, American economist, Nobel Prize laureate (d. 2014)
- December 3 – Jean-Luc Godard, French film director (d. 2022)
- December 4
  - Ronnie Corbett, Scottish-born comedian (d. 2016)
  - Jacqueline du Bief, French figure skater
- December 6 – Daniel Lisulo, Prime Minister of Zambia (d. 2000)
- December 7 – Christopher Nicole, Guyanese-born British writer (d. 2017)
- December 8
  - Maximilian Schell, Swiss-Austrian actor (d. 2014)
  - Michael Kahn, American film editor.
- December 9
  - Edoardo Sanguineti, Italian writer (d. 2010)
  - Buck Henry, American actor, screenwriter and director (d. 2020)
- December 11 – Jean-Louis Trintignant, French actor and director (d. 2022)
- December 12 – Silvio Santos, Brazilian TV show host, entrepreneur (d. 2024)
- December 14 – Fred Gray, American attorney, civil rights movement legal representative
- December 15
  - Henri B. Kagan, French chemist, Nobel Prize laureate
  - Antonietta Meo, Italian saint (d. 1937)
  - Edna O'Brien, Irish novelist (d. 2024)
- December 17 – Armin Mueller-Stahl, Russian-born German actor
- December 19 – Anca Giurchescu, Romanian academic and ethnochoreologist (d. 2015)
- December 21
  - Adebayo Adedeji, Nigerian UN official (d. 2018)
  - Kalevi Sorsa, Prime Minister of Finland (d. 2004)
- December 25 – Salah Jahin, Egyptian poet, lyricist, playwright and cartoonist (d. 1986)
- December 28 – Mariam A. Aleem, Egyptian artist (d. 2010)
- December 30
  - Alvin Peterson, Jamaican percussionist (d. 2021)
  - Tu Youyou, Chinese pharmaceutical chemist, Nobel Prize laureate
- December 31 – Odetta, American singer (d. 2008)

== Deaths ==
=== January – February ===
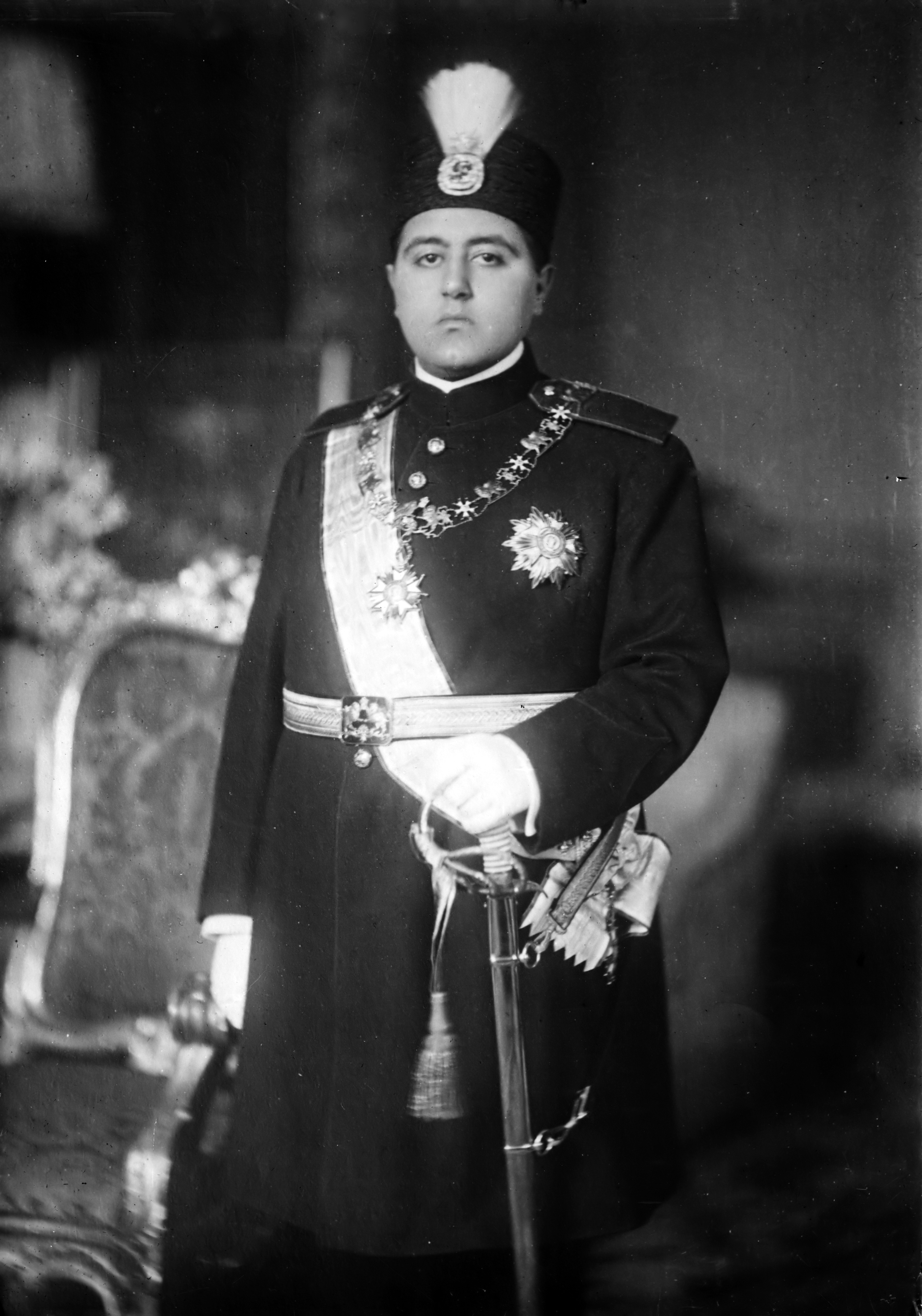
Ahmad Shah Qajar

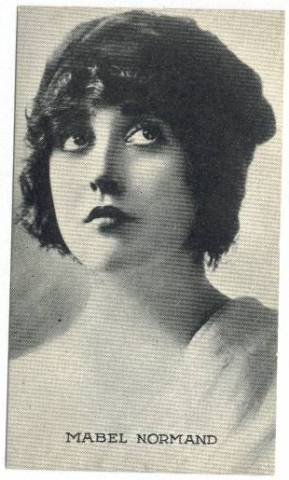
Mabel Normand

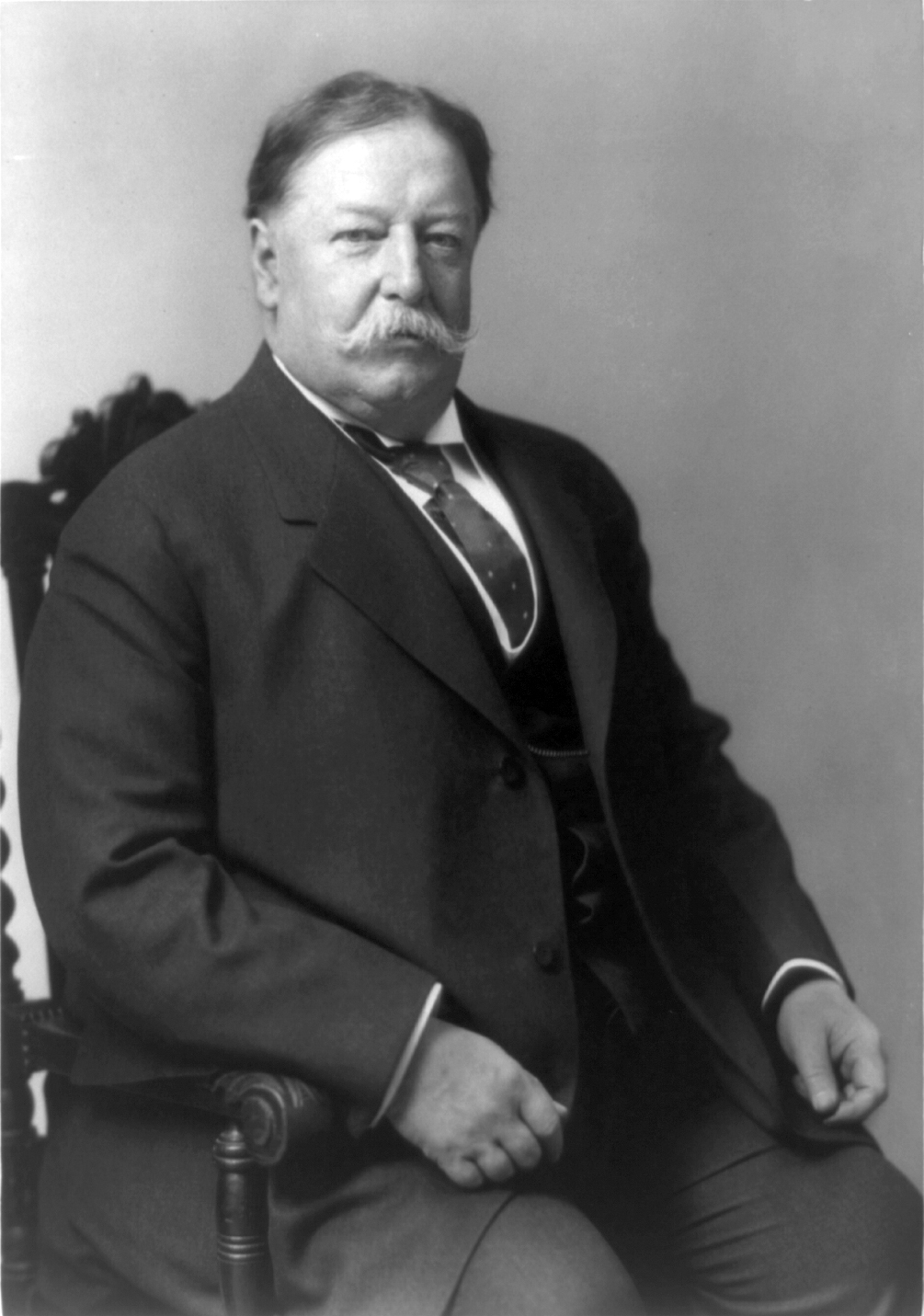
William Howard Taft

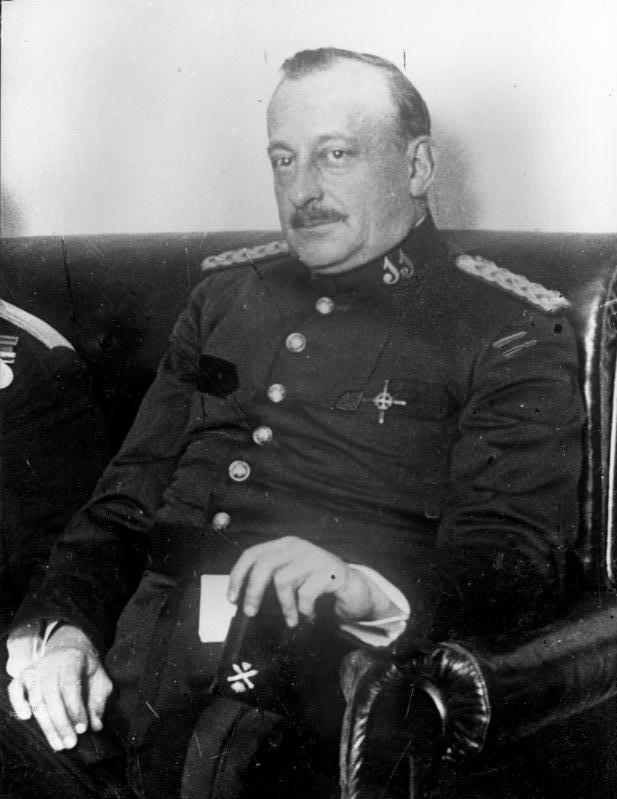
Miguel Primo de Rivera

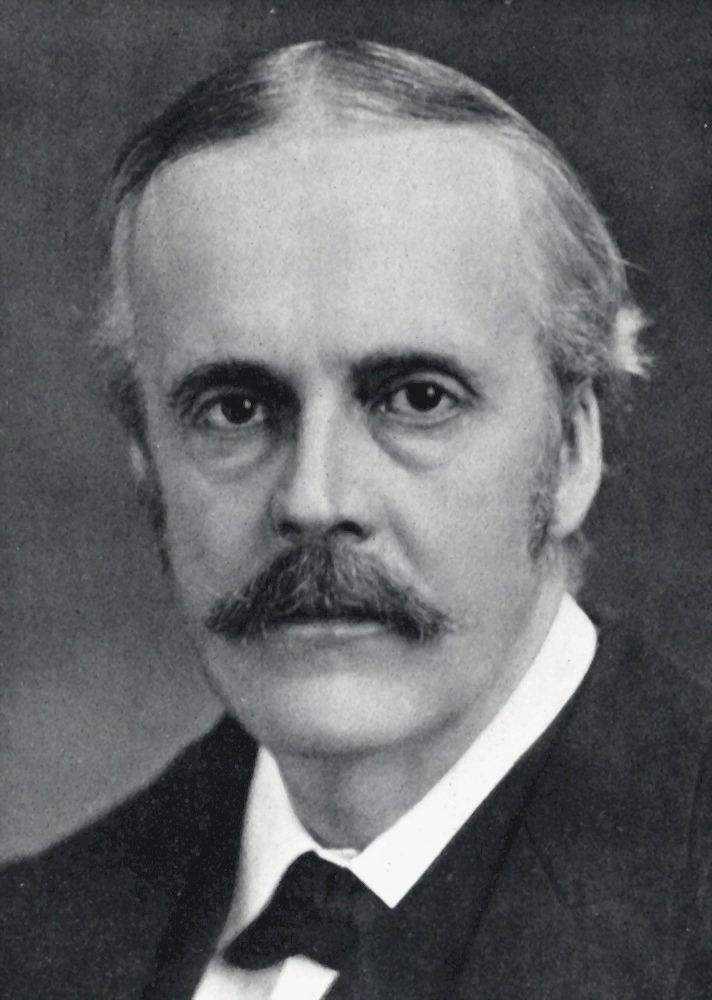
Arthur Balfour

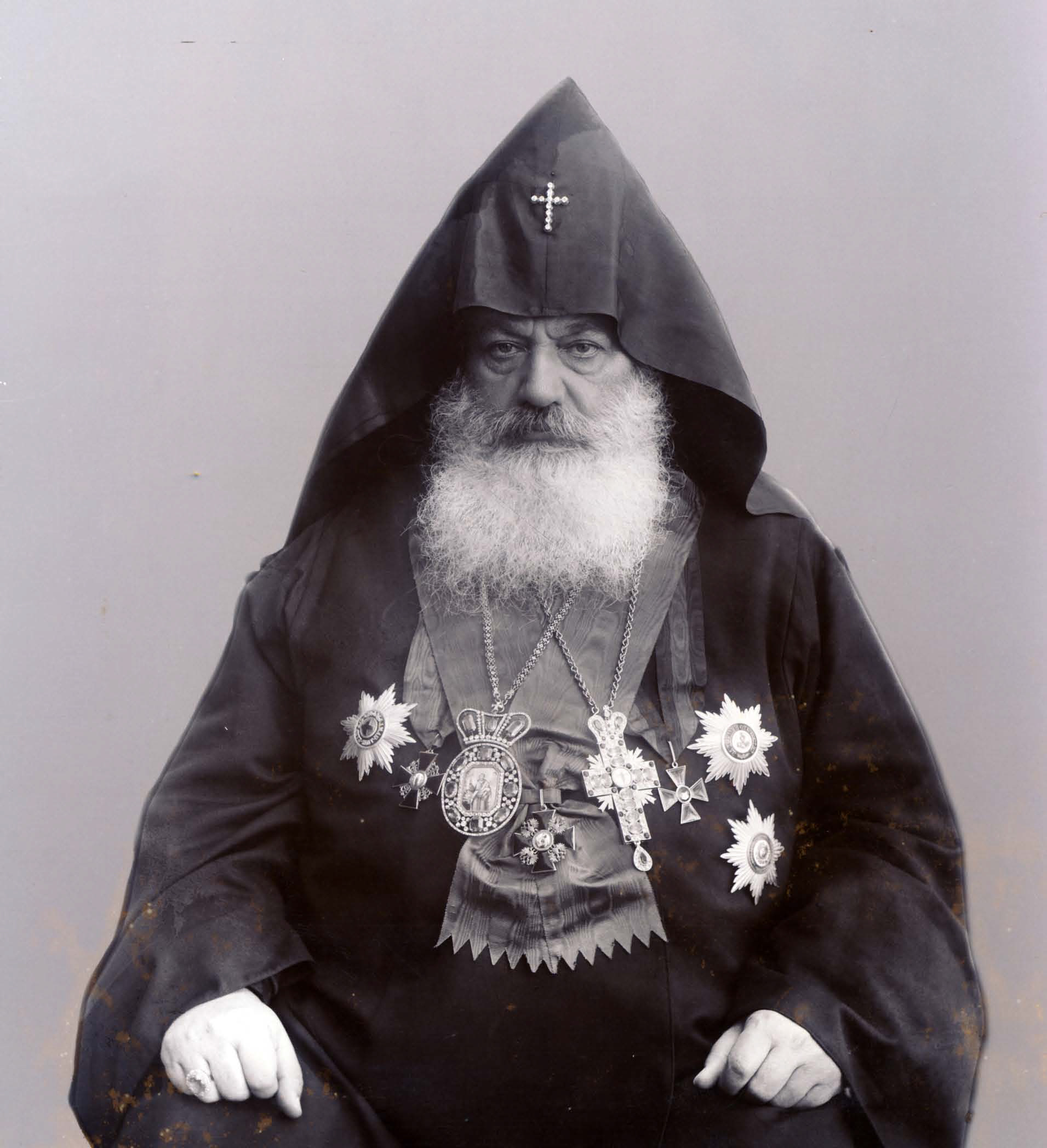
Patriarch George V of Armenia

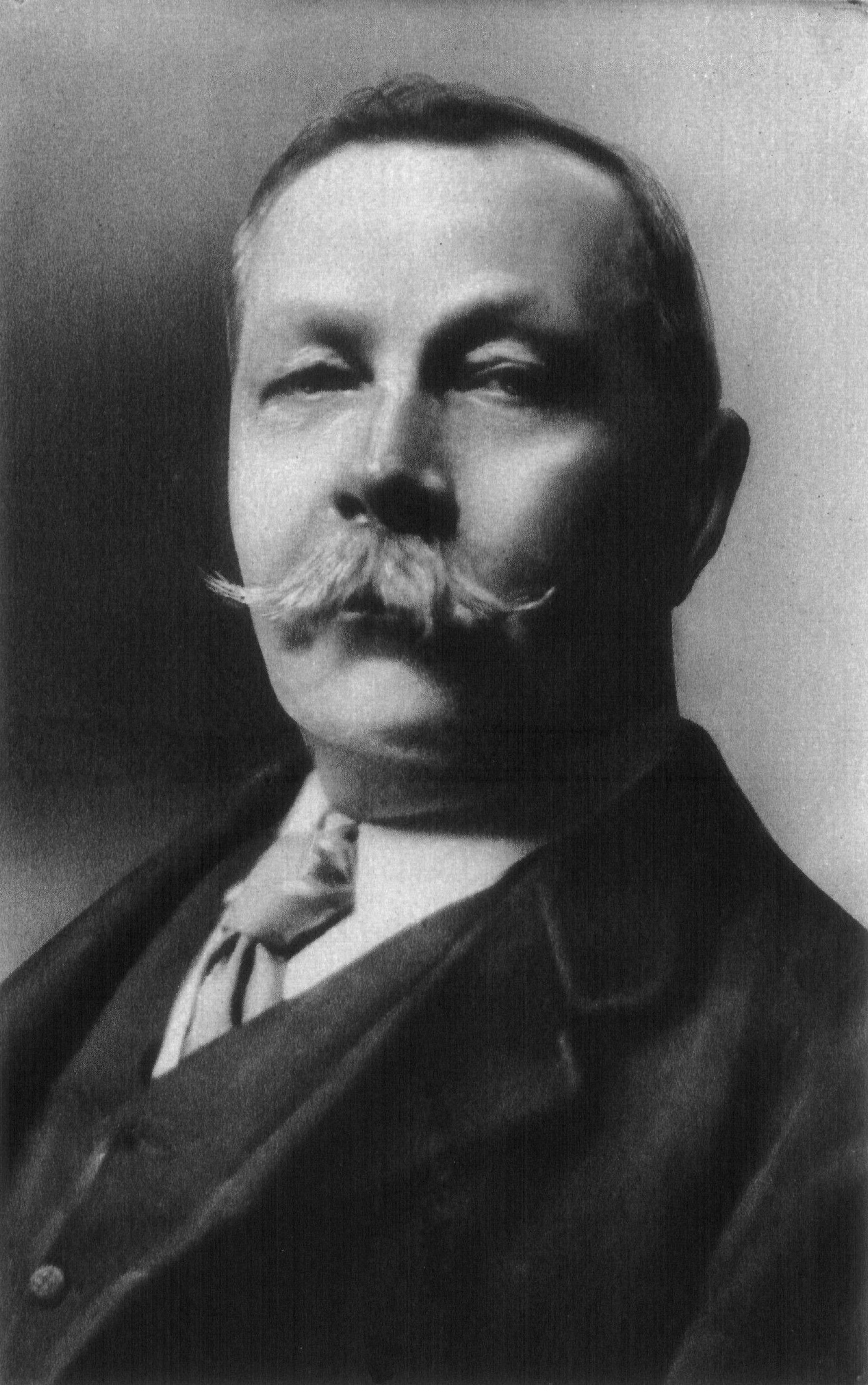
Sir Arthur Conan Doyle

- January 8 – Martha Tynæs, Norwegian social worker and politician (b. 1870)
- January 9 – Edward Bok, American author (b. 1863)
- January 19 – Frank Ramsey, British philosopher, mathematician and economist (b. 1903)
- January 22 – Reginald Brett, 2nd Viscount Esher, British politician and courtier (b. 1852)
- January 24 – Rebecca Latimer Felton, American writer, lecturer, reformer, and politician (b. 1835)
- January 27 – Dewa Shigetō, Japanese admiral (b. 1856)
- January 28 – Emmy Destinn, Czech operatic soprano (b. 1878)
- February 3
  - Michele Bianchi, Italian fascist leader (b. 1883)
  - Poseidon, Australian racehorse (b. 1903)
- February 14 – Sir Thomas MacKenzie, New Zealand politician, explorer, 18th Prime Minister of New Zealand and High Commissioner (b. 1854)
- February 15 – Giulio Douhet, Italian general, air power theorist (b. 1869)
- February 21 – Ahmad Shah Qajar, Shah of Persia (b. 1898)
- February 23
  - Mabel Normand, American actress (b. 1892)
  - Horst Wessel, Nazi ideologue, composer (b. 1907)
- February 26
  - Mary Whiton Calkins, American philosopher and psychologist (b. 1863)
  - Rafael Merry del Val, British-born Spanish Roman Catholic cardinal and Servant of God (b. 1865)

=== March – April ===
- March 2 – D. H. Lawrence, British writer (b. 1885)
- March 6 – Alfred von Tirpitz, German politician, admiral (b. 1848)
- March 8 – William Howard Taft, 27th President of the United States, 10th Chief Justice of the United States (b. 1857)
- March 12 – William George Barker, Canadian pilot (b. 1894)
- March 13 – Mary Eleanor Wilkins Freeman, American author (b. 1852)
- March 14 – A. A. Kannisto, Finnish politician (b. 1876)
- March 16 – Miguel Primo de Rivera, Spanish military officer, Prime Minister of Spain (b. 1870)
- March 19 – Arthur Balfour, British politician and statesman, 48th Prime Minister of the United Kingdom (b. 1848)
- March 24 – Eugeen Van Mieghem, Belgian painter (b. 1875)
- March 27 – Sister Christine, German-born Hindu teacher
- March 30 – Shyamji Krishna Varma, Indian lawyer, journalist and revolutionary (b. 1857)
- April 1 – Cosima Wagner, wife and inspiration of Richard Wagner (b. 1837)
- April 2 – Empress Zewditu of Ethiopia (b. 1876)
- April 3 – Dame Emma Albani, Canadian operatic soprano (b. 1847)
- April 4 – Victoria of Baden, Queen consort of Sweden (b. 1862)
- April 6 – Dimitrije, Serbian Patriarch (b. 1846)
- April 9 – Rose Caron, French operatic soprano (b. 1857)
- April 14 – Vladimir Mayakovsky, Russian poet (b. 1893)
- April 21 – Robert Bridges, British poet (b. 1844)
- April 22 – Jeppe Aakjær, Danish poet, novelist (b. 1866)

=== May – June ===
- May 8 – Patriarch George V of Armenia (b. 1847)
- May 13 – Fridtjof Nansen, Norwegian explorer, recipient of the Nobel Peace Prize (b. 1861)
- May 17 – Herbert Croly, American political author (b. 1869)
- May 25
  - Randall Davidson, English clergyman, Archbishop of Canterbury (b. 1848)
  - Archduke Rainer of Austria (b. 1895)
- June 5
  - Sophie Holten, Danish painter (b. 1858)
  - Eric Lemming, Swedish athlete (b. 1880)
  - Jules Pascin, Bulgarian painter (b. 1885)
- June 9 – William Allardyce, British colonial governor (b. 1861)
- June 10 – Adolf von Harnack, German Lutheran theologian and church historian (b. 1851)
- June 13 – Sir Henry Segrave, British racer, land and water speed record holder (b. 1896)
- June 14 – Enrico Millo, Italian admiral and politician (b. 1865)
- June 16 – Anna Whitlock, Swedish suffragist (b. 1852)
- June 30 – Yashiro Rokurō, Japanese admiral and politician (b. 1860)

=== July– August ===
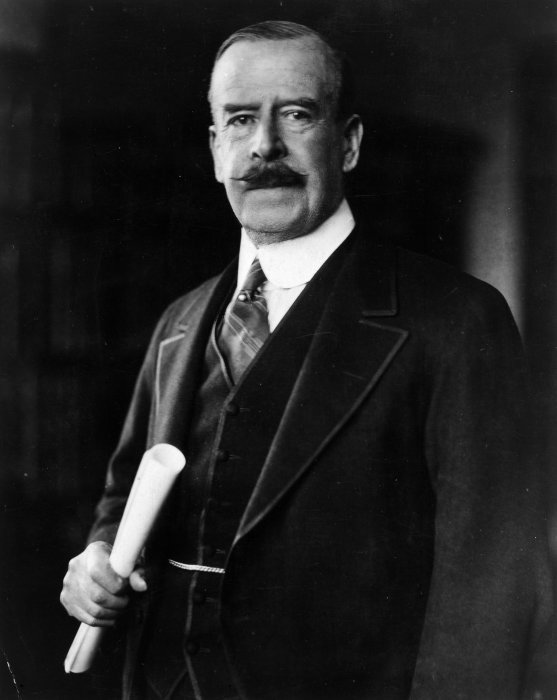
Joseph Ward

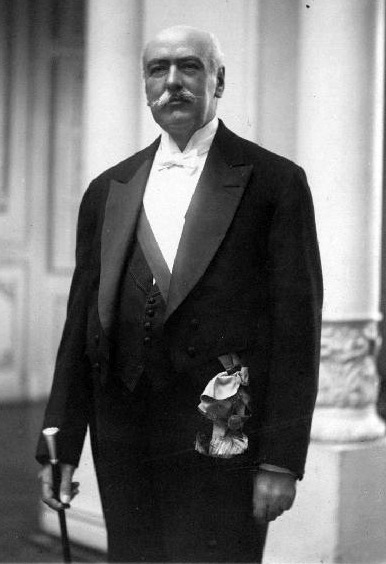
Juan Luis Sanfuentes

- July 7 – Sir Arthur Conan Doyle, British fiction writer (Sherlock Holmes) (b. 1859)
- July 8 – Sir Joseph Ward, 17th Prime Minister of New Zealand (b. 1856)
- July 11 – Masataka Ogawa, Japanese chemist (b. 1865)
- July 15
  - Leopold Auer, Hungarian violinist (b. 1845)
  - Rudolph Schildkraut, Ottoman-born Austrian actor (b. 1862)
- July 16 – Juan Luis Sanfuentes, 16th President of Chile (b. 1858)
- July 19
  - David Bonis, Canadian politician
  - Sir Robert Stout, 2-time prime minister of New Zealand (b. 1844)
  - Oku Yasukata, Japanese field marshal, leading figure in the early Imperial Japanese Army (b. 1847)
- July 23 – Glenn Curtiss, American aviation pioneer (b. 1878)
- July 26 – Pavlos Karolidis, Greek historian (b. 1849)
- July 28 – Allvar Gullstrand, Swedish ophthalmologist, recipient of the Nobel Prize in Physiology or Medicine (b. 1862)
- August 3 – James Alexander Anderson, Canadian politician
- August 4 – Siegfried Wagner, German composer and conductor, son of Richard Wagner (born 1869)
- August 11 – Edward Angle, American dentist (b. 1855)
- August 12 – Sir Horace Smith-Dorrien, English general (b. 1858)
- August 15 – Florian Cajori, Swiss-born historian of mathematics (b. 1859)
- August 21 – Sir Aston Webb, British architect (b. 1849)
- August 24 – Tom Norman, British freak showman (b. 1860)
- August 26 – Lon Chaney, American actor (b. 1883)
- August 29 – William Archibald Spooner, British scholar, Anglican priest (b. 1844)

=== September– October ===
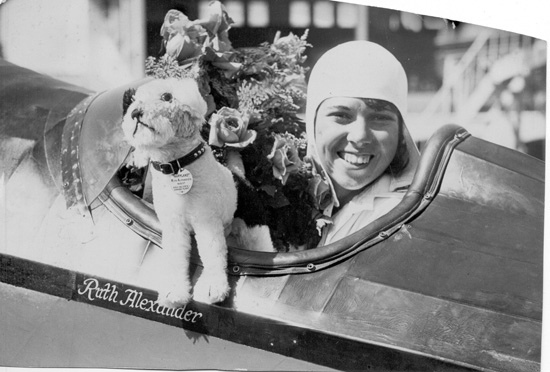
Ruth Alexander

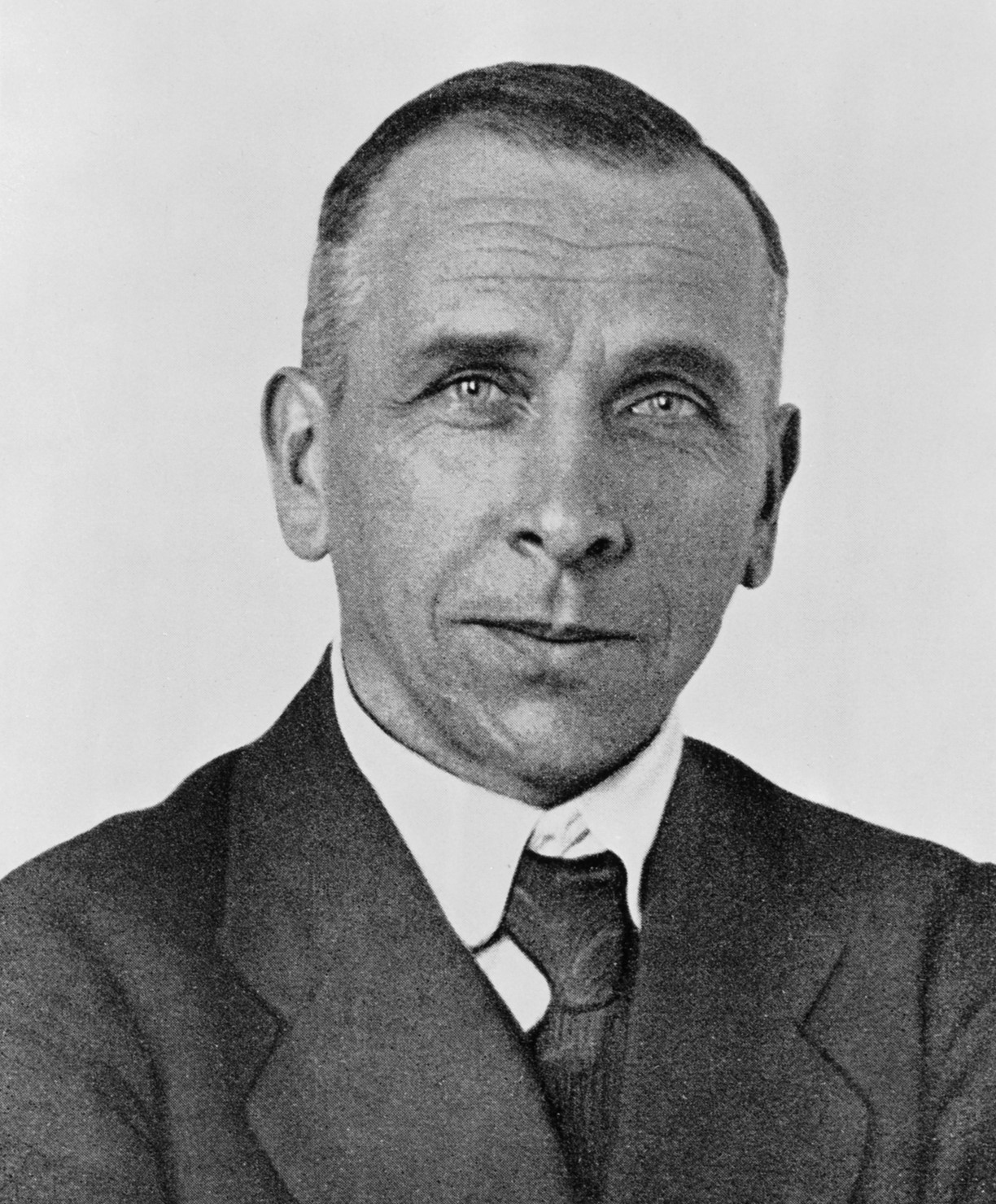
Alfred Wegener

- September 1 – Peeter Põld, Estonian pedagogical scientist, politician (b. 1878)
- September 10 – Aubrey Faulkner, South African cricketer (b. 1881)
- September 18 – Ruth Alexander, pioneering American pilot (b. 1905)
- September 20 – Gombojab Tsybikov, Russian explorer (b. 1873)
- September 28
  - Daniel Guggenheim, American mining magnate and philanthropist (b. 1856)
  - Prince Leopold of Bavaria, German prince and field marshal (b. 1846)
- October 4 – Olena Pchilka, Ukrainian writer, translator and publisher (b. 1849)
- October 10 – Adolf Engler, German botanist (b. 1844)
- October 15 – Herbert Henry Dow, Canadian-born chemical industrialist (b. 1866)
- October 16 – James Surtees Phillpotts, English writer and educator (b. 1839)
- October 20 – Valeriano Weyler, 1st Duke of Rubí, Spanish general (b. 1838)
- October 26 – Harry Payne Whitney, American horse breeder and businessman (b. 1872)
- October 27 – Ellen Hayes, American mathematician and astronomer (b. 1851)
- October 28 – Mary Harrison McKee, de facto First Lady of the United States (b. 1858)
- October 30 – Sakichi Toyoda, Japanese inventor, industrialist (b. 1867)

=== November – December ===
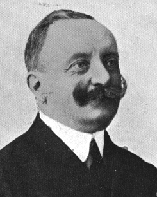
Luigi Facta

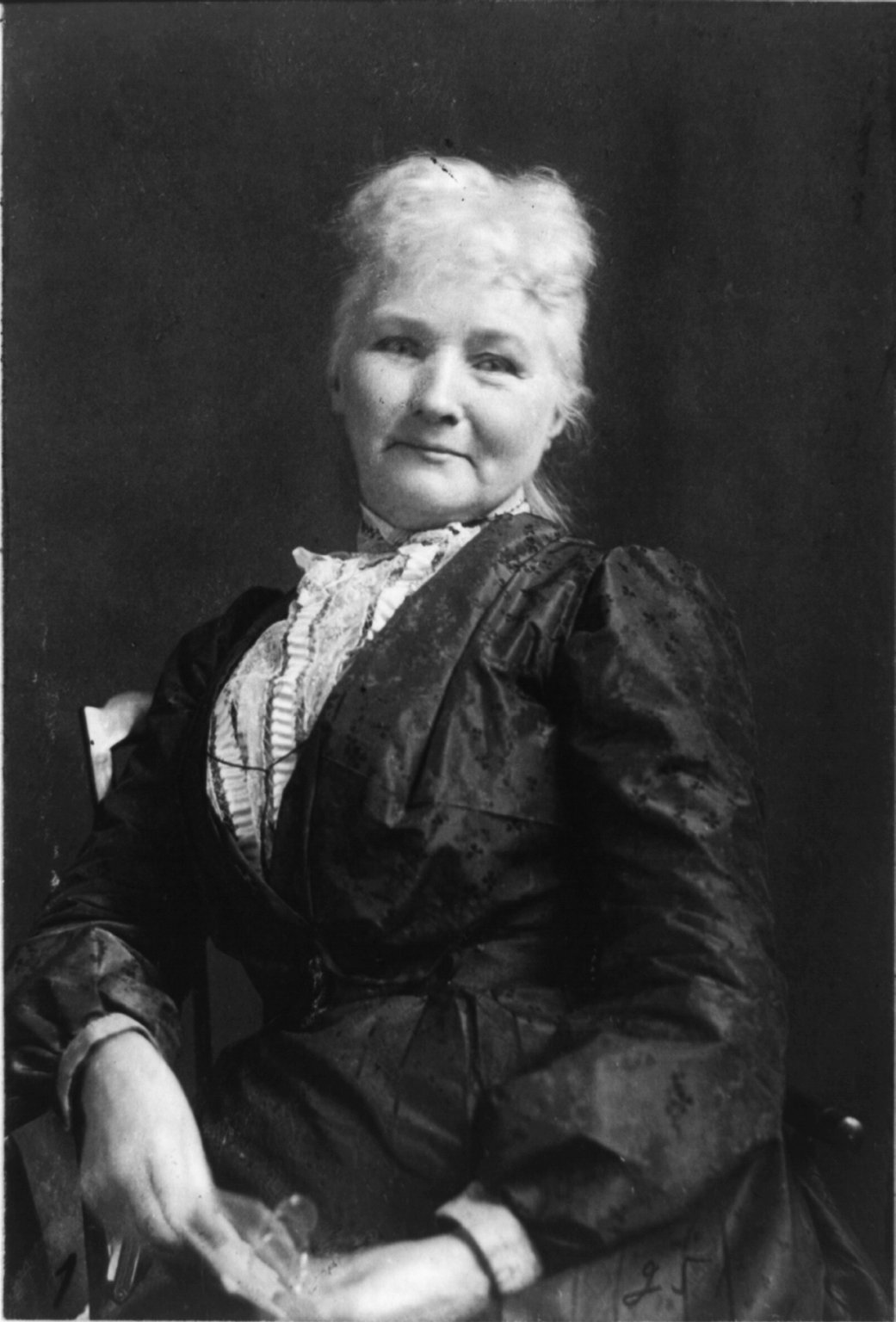
Mary Harris Jones (Mother Jones)

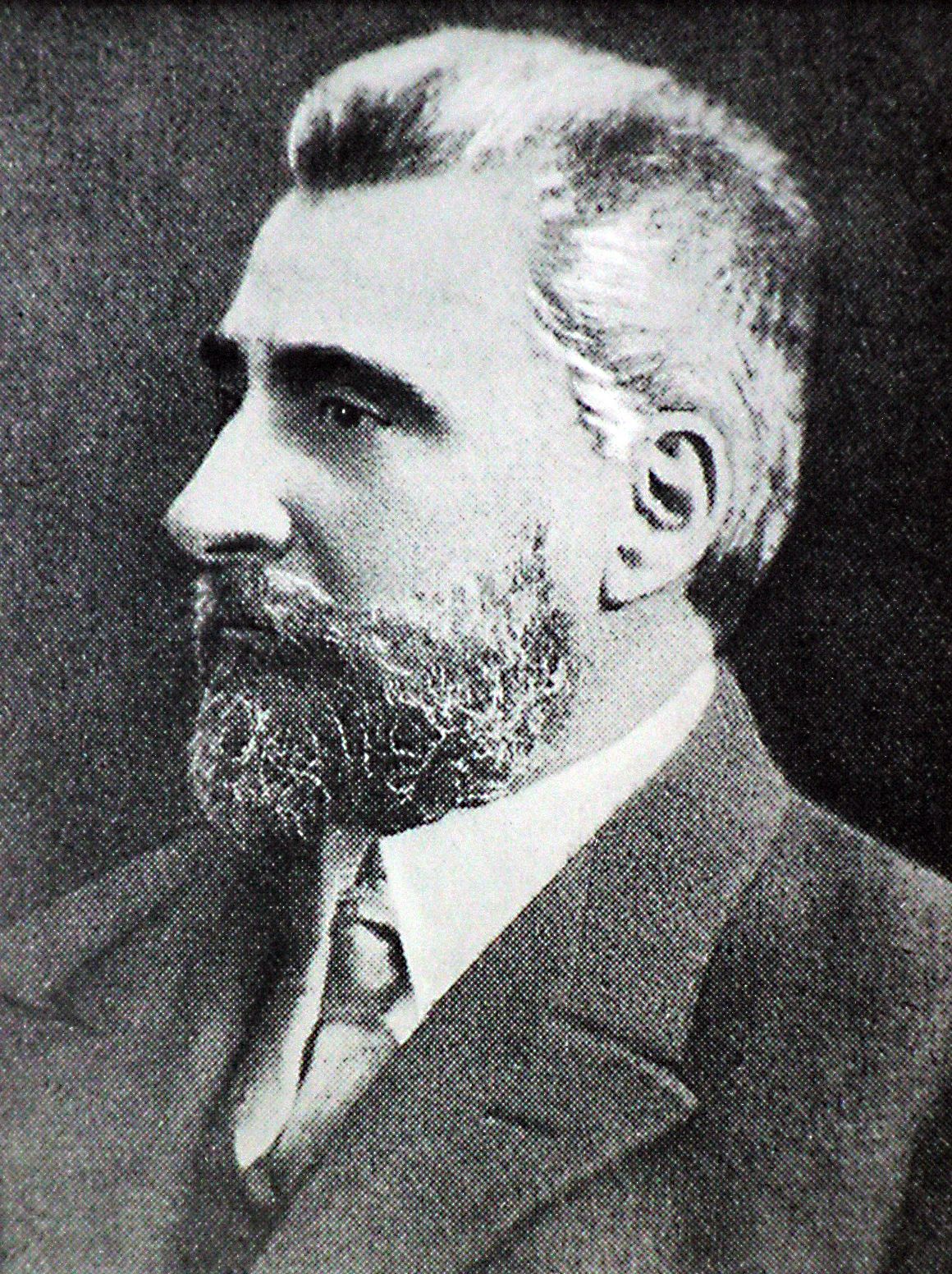
Vintilă Brătianu

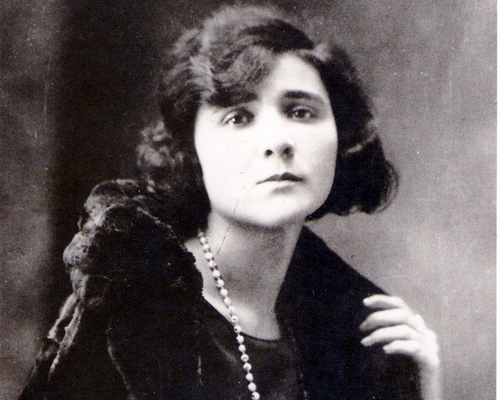
Florbela Espanca

- November – Alfred Wegener, German geophysicist, meteorologist (b. 1880)
- November 3 – Nikolai Alexandrov, Soviet actor and director (b. 1870)
- November 4 – Akiyama Yoshifuru, Japanese general (b. 1859)
- November 5
  - Christiaan Eijkman, Dutch physician, pathologist, and recipient of the Nobel Prize in Physiology or Medicine (b. 1858)
  - Luigi Facta, Italian politician, 26th Prime Minister of Italy (b. 1861)
- November 8 – Alexander Bedward, Jamaican preacher (b. 1848)
- November 9 – Tasker H. Bliss, American general (b. 1853)
- November 20 – Sir Neville Howse, Australian politician and recipient of the Victoria Cross (b. 1863)
- November 21 – Clelia Merloni, Italian nun and founder of the Apostles of the Sacred Heart of Jesus
- November 26 – Sir Ponnambalam Ramanathan, Sinhalese lawyer and politician (b. 1851)
- November 27
  - Johnny Tyldesley, English cricketer (b. 1873)
  - Simon Kahquados, Potawatomi political activist (b. 1851)
- November 28 – Constantine VI, Turkish-born bishop, briefly Ecumenical Patriarch of Constantinople (b. 1859)
- November 30 – Mary Harris Jones, Irish-born American labor leader (b. 1837)
- December 8 – Florbela Espanca, Portuguese poet (b. 1894)
- December 9
  - Andrew "Rube" Foster, American Negro league baseball player (b. 1879)
  - Laura Muntz Lyall, Canadian painter (b. 1860)
- December 12 – Nikolai Pokrovsky, Russian politician, last foreign minister of the Russian Empire (b. 1865)
- December 13 – Fritz Pregl, Austrian chemist, Nobel Prize laureate (b. 1869)
- December 17 – Peter Warlock, British composer (b. 1894)
- December 22 – Vintilă Brătianu, 31st Prime Minister of Romania (b. 1867)
- December 25 – Eugen Goldstein, German physicist (b. 1850)

== Nobel Prizes ==

- Physics – Sir Chandrasekhara Venkata Raman
- Chemistry – Hans Fischer
- Physiology or Medicine – Karl Landsteiner
- Literature – Sinclair Lewis
- Peace – Nathan Söderblom

== Sources ==
- The 1930s Timeline: 1930 – from American Studies Programs at The University of Virginia
