= Dap =

DAP or Dap may refer to:

== Science ==
- DAP (gene), human gene that encodes death-associated proteins, which mediate programmed cell death
- Diamidophosphate, phosphorylating compound
- Diaminopimelic acid, amino acid derivative of lysine
- Diaminopyridine, drug for the treatment of rare muscular diseases
- Diaminopyrimidine, a class of organic chemicals
- Diammonium phosphate, chemical used as a fertilizer and flame retardant
- Dog appeasing pheromone, synthetic analogue of a canine hormone
- Dose area product, a measurement of radiation exposure

== Technology ==
- DAP (software), a statistical analysis program
- Debug Access Port, for ARM processors
- Digital adoption platform, a type of automated software tool
  - Digital Adoption Platform, software from WalkMe
- Digital Archive Project, a collaboration for publishing non-mainstream TV programmes
- Digital audio player, a class of electronic devices that play digital audio
- Direct-Action Penetrator, the gunship version of the Sikorsky UH-60 Black Hawk helicopter
- Directory Access Protocol, computer networking standard
- Distributed Array Processor, the first commercial massively parallel computer
- Domain Application Protocol, for distributed computing
- Sinking (metalworking) or dapping, a metalworking technique

== Companies ==
- Aerovías DAP (ICAO code DAP), a Chilean airline group
  - DAP Helicópteros (ICAO code DHE), helicopter subsidiary
- DAP Products, American manufacturer of sealant materials
- DAP Technologies, division of Roper Industries
- Department of Aircraft Production, World War II name for Government Aircraft Factories, Australia
  - DAP Beaufort, a variant of the Bristol Beaufort bomber aircraft
- Distributed Art Publishers, an American company that distributes and publishes

== Organizations ==
- DAP Championship, former golf tournament
- DAP Racing, former US horse-racing partnership
- Democratic Action Party, a Malaysian political party
- Departamento Aeroportuário (RS), Department of Aviation of the State of Rio Grande do Sul, Brazil
- Development Assessment Panels, independent bodies overseeing development in Western Australia
- Dienst für Analyse und Prävention, precursor of the Federal Intelligence Service, Switzerland
- Dipartimento dell'amministrazione penitenziaria, prisons branch of the Ministry of Justice (Italy)
- Direction de l'Administration pénitentiaire, prisons branch of the Ministry of Justice (France)
- German Workers' Party (Deutsche Arbeiterpartei), 1919–1920 precursor of the Nazi Party
- German Workers' Party (Austria-Hungary) (Deutsche Arbeiterpartei), 1903–1918
- German Labour Party of Poland (Deutsche Arbeiterpartei von Polens), 1922–1925
  - German Socialist Labour Party of Poland (DSAP), formed from the 1925-1929 merger of DAP with the German Social Democratic Party (Poland)

== Places ==
- Darachula Airport (IATA airport code DAP), Khalanga, Darchula, Nepal
- Dap, Iran, a village
- Durham Athletic Park (nicknamed "The DAP"), a former minor league baseball park in Durham, North Carolina, US

== People ==
- Ashok Kondabolu, stage name Dapwell or Dap, American rapper
- Dap 'Sugar' Willie, American actor and comedian

== Other uses ==
- Dap greeting or fist bump
- Dap, ancient name for the daf, a frame drum
- Plimsoll shoes or daps
- Delivered at place, an international commercial term
- Developmentally appropriate practice, in childhood education
- Draw-a-Person test, a psychological test

== See also ==
- Dapp (disambiguation)
