= 1935 Silesian Parliament election =

- 8 September 1935
- All 24 seats in the Silesian Sejm; 13 seats needed for a majority
Marshal of the Sejm before	Marshal of the Sejm after
Konstanty Wolny; PSChD	Karol Grzesik; NChZP

Parliamentary elections were held in the Silesian Voivodeship on 8 September 1935 to elect deputies to the Silesian Sejm.

== Results ==
Party	Votes	%	Seats
All Candidates	372,275	100.00	24
Total	372,275	100.00	24
Valid votes	372,275	69.68	
Invalid/blank votes	162,001	30.32	
Total votes	534,276	100.00	
Registered voters/turnout	699,839	76.34	
Source: Rechowicz, Henryk. Sejm Śląski 1922-1939.

=== Elected candidates ===
The following candidates were elected:

Constituency	Candidates	
I. Katowice	Adam Kocur	Włodzimierz Dąbrowski
II. Kochłowice	Alojzy Kot	Antoni Olszowski
III. Siemianowice	Tadeusz Karczewski	Karol Gajdzik
IV. Chorzów	Karol Grzesik	Paweł Kubik
V. Tarnowskie Góry	Emil Gajdas	Paweł Golaś
VI. Świętochłowice	Stefan Kapuściński	Józef Trojok
VII. Szarlej-Wielkie Piekary	Bartłomiej Płonka	Franciszek Urbańczyk
VIII. Rybnik	Piotr Kolonko	Jan Dziuba
IX. Wodzisław	Józef Michalski	Juliusz Zając
X. Pszczyna	Adolf Grajcarek	Jóżef Płonka
XI. Mikołów	Jan Koj	Franciszek Fesser
XII. Cieszyn	Jan Kotas	Karol Palarczyk
