= Sui =

Sui typically refers to

- Sui dynasty (581–618), a Chinese dynasty notable for reuniting the country and establishing the Grand Canal

Sui or SUI may also refer to:

== Places ==
- State University of Iowa, the legal name of the University of Iowa
- Sui County, Henan, China
- Sui County, Hubei in western Suizhou, Hubei in central China
- Sui, Balochistan, Pakistan
  - Sui gas field, near Sui, Balochistan
- Sui, Bhiwani, Haryana, India
- Sui, Rajasthan, India
- Suisun–Fairfield station, Amtrak station code SUI
- Suizhou, Hubei, China, formerly Sui County
- Sukhumi Babushara Airport, IATA code SUI
- Switzerland (SUI is its International Olympic Committee code or FIFA country code, based on the French name suisse)

== People ==
- Sui (surname), a transcription of two Chinese surnames
- Sui people, one of the Kam–Sui peoples, an ethnic group of China and Vietnam
  - Sui language spoken by the Shui
- Sui (state), a Zhou-dynasty Chinese state

== Other ==
- Sui, meaning "years of age" in Chinese age reckoning
- Sui or mizu, 水, meaning "Water" in Japanese, one of the elements in the Japanese system of five elements and representing the fluid, flowing, formless things in the world
- Sui (粋), an ideal in Japanese aesthetics similar to iki
- Sui, a local name for the Wangi-wangi white-eye, a bird
- Simplified user interface, a stylised illustration used in marketing, user onboarding and technical communication
- Societate Ukrainian de Interlingua, Interlingua for the Ukrainian Society for Interlingua
- Sonic user interface or speech user interface, similar to GUI for graphical user interface
- Speleological Union of Ireland, the All-Ireland representative body for caving
- State unemployment insurance, an employer-funded program that provides benefits for workers who lose their job
- Stress urinary incontinence, also known as effort incontinence
- Stanford University Interim, a type of channel model
- Sui (or siuuu), the main exclamation used frequently in the widely popularized goal celebration of Cristiano Ronaldo
- Sui (blockchain), a layer-1 blockchain and smart-contract platform
- Sun Communities, NYSE stock ticker symbol SUI

== See also ==
- Sui generis, a Latin phrase meaning "of itself"
- Sui iuris, a Latin phrase "of one's own right"
