= May 1930 Silesian Parliament election =

- 13 May 1930
- All 48 seats in the Silesian Sejm; 25 seats needed for a majority
Party	Vote %	Seats	+/–
Deutsche Wählgemeinschaft	29.96	15	+3
People's Catholic Bloc	22.74	13	−5
National-Christian Labour Union	17.08	10	New
Polish Socialist Party	8.75	4	−4
National Workers' Party	6.88	3	−4
Bloc Worker-Peasant Unity	4.58	2	+2
German Social Democratic Worker's Party	4.24	1	−1
This lists parties that won seats. See the complete results below.
Marshal of the Sejm before	Marshal of the Sejm after
Konstanty Wolny; PSChD	Konstanty Wolny; PSChD

Parliamentary elections were held in the Silesian Voivodeship on 13 May 1930 to elect deputies to the Silesian Sejm.

== Results ==
Party or alliance		Votes	%	Seats	+/–
Deutsche Wählgemeinschaft	German Catholic People's Party	180,246	29.96	10	+4
Deutsche Wählgemeinschaft	German Party	180,246	29.96	5	−1
Deutsche Wählgemeinschaft	Total	180,246	29.96	15	+3
People's Catholic Bloc		136,808	22.74	13	−5
National-Christian Labour Union		102,762	17.08	10	New
Polish Socialist Party		52,653	8.75	4	−4
National Workers' Party		41,406	6.88	3	−4
Bloc Worker-Peasant Unity		27,586	4.58	2	+2
German Social Democratic Worker's Party		25,513	4.24	1	−1
Union of Owners of Homes and Land		9,319	1.55	0	New
Polish Socialist Party – former Revolutionary Faction		4,686	0.78	0	New
United Front of Upper Silesian Workers		4,421	0.73	0	New
Christian Party for the Protection of Refugees, and the Working and Middle Class		4,313	0.72	0	New
United Front of Peasants		3,343	0.56	0	New
Silesian Catholic Centre		3,019	0.50	0	New
Common Economic Union of the Middle Strata		2,485	0.41	0	New
Silesian People's Union		1,695	0.28	0	New
Silesian Self-Defence Bloc		1,141	0.19	0	New
Union of Silesian Farmers		276	0.05	0	New
Total		601,672	100.00	48	–
Valid votes		601,672	99.37		
Invalid/blank votes		3,827	0.63		
Total votes		605,499	100.00		
Registered voters/turnout		665,974	90.92		
Source: "Zestawienie wyników głosowania do Sejmu Śląskiego według powiatów i miast".
