= November 1930 Silesian Parliament election =

- 23 November 1930
- All 48 seats in the Silesian Sejm; 25 seats needed for a majority
Party	Vote %	Seats	+/–
People's Catholic Bloc	37.25	19	+3
National-Christian Labour Union	35.65	19	+9
Deutsche Wählgemeinschaft	13.40	7	−8
German Social Democratic Worker's Party	5.01	2	+1
Polish Socialist Party	5.16	1	−3
This lists parties that won seats. See the complete results below.
Marshal of the Sejm before	Marshal of the Sejm after
Konstanty Wolny; PSChD	Konstanty Wolny; PSChD

Parliamentary elections were held in the Silesian Voivodeship on 23 November 1930 to elect deputies to the Silesian Sejm.

== Results ==
Party or alliance		Votes	%	Seats	+/–
People's Catholic Bloc	People's Catholic Bloc	202,679	37.25	16	+3
People's Catholic Bloc	National Workers' Party	202,679	37.25	3	0
People's Catholic Bloc	Total	202,679	37.25	19	+3
National-Christian Labour Union		193,936	35.65	19	+9
Deutsche Wählgemeinschaft	German Catholic People's Party	72,900	13.40	5	−5
Deutsche Wählgemeinschaft	German Party	72,900	13.40	2	−3
Deutsche Wählgemeinschaft	Total	72,900	13.40	7	−8
Polish Socialist Party		28,079	5.16	1	−3
German Social Democratic Worker's Party		27,256	5.01	2	+1
Unity of Workers and Peasants		12,596	2.32	0	−2
Polish Socialist Party – former Revolutionary Faction		4,205	0.77	0	0
Polish People's Party "Piast"		2,297	0.42	0	New
Bloc of Unemployed and Invalids		111	0.02	0	New
Polish Socialist Party Left		9	0.00	0	New
Polish and German Workers in Silesia		7	0.00	0	New
Total		544,075	100.00	48	–
Valid votes		544,075	89.94		
Invalid/blank votes		60,827	10.06		
Total votes		604,902	100.00		
Registered voters/turnout		674,149	89.73		
Source: "Gazeta Urzędowa Województwa Śląskiego, 1931, R. 10, nr 2".
