= National-Christian Labour Union =

National-Christian Labour Union Narodowo-Chrześcijańskie Zjednoczenie Pracy (Polish)
- Founded: November 1927
- Dissolved: July 1937
- Membership (1937): 17,000
- Ideology: Sanation

The National-Christian Labour Union (Polish: Narodowo-Chrześcijańskie Zjednoczenie Pracy, NChZP) was a political organization that united supporters of Sanation in the Silesian Voivodeship. It was created in November 1927 with the initiative of Voivode Michał Grażyński (initially under the name Polish Labour Union) as a bloc uniting not only Piłsudskiites, but also the Union of Silesian Catholics under priest Józef Londzin and the Silesian chapters of the National Workers' Party, PSL „Piast” and the Popular National Union. In the 1928 Polish parliamentary election, the NChZP gained 30,6% of the vote in Silesia.

In September 1928, the Union was transformed into a fully Sanationist organization. Priest Londzin became the leader of the Union, with Emanuel Grim succeeding him following his death. The Union was based on the structures of the Union of Silesian Insurgents and Union of the Defence of the Western Kresy, among workers it was also based on the General Federation of Labour (later Union of Trade Unions). The NChZP united nationalist ideology with the plight of labourers and elements of Silesian regionalism.

During the 1930 elections, the Union was endorsed by the Polish Socialist Party – former Revolutionary Faction, dissidents of the Polish Christian Democratic Party and ephemeral Silesian National Bloc, which considered itself the representatives of the local population. In the elections to the Silesian Sejm in May 1930, NChZP earned 17,1% of the vote, and in the November election, 35,7%.

Between 1931 and 1933, the Union stagnated, from which it began recoverting in 1933. In the 1935 election, boycotted by the opposition, the Silesian sanationists managed to dominate the Silesian Sejm, which created internal conflicts within the party. In 1937, the NChZP had 17,000 members oriented around 310 circles. In June 1937, it was transformed into a Silesian wing of the Camp of National Unity.

NChZP was affiliated with the newspaper "Western Poland". Its leading activists were Karol Grzesik, Stefan Kapuściński, Rudolf Kornke, Ignacy Nowak, Włodzimierz Dąbrowski, Alojzy Pawelec, Alojzy Kot.
