= Feese =

Feese is a German-language surname. Notable people with this surname include:

- Blake Feese (born 1982), American auto racing driver
- Brett Feese (born 1954), American politician from Pennsylvania

== See also ==
- Feser
- Fesser
