= Socialist Labour Party =

Socialist Labor Party or Socialist Labour Party may refer to:

- German Socialist Labour Party of Poland
- German Socialist Labour Party in Poland – Left
- Gibraltar Socialist Labour Party
- Independent Socialist Labour Party, Poland
- Industrial Socialist Labor Party, Australia
- Luxembourg Socialist Workers' Party
- Revolutionary Socialist Labor Party, United States
- Socialist Labor Party of America
- Socialist Labor Party (Australia)
- Socialist Labour Party (Canada)
- Socialist Labour Party (Egypt)
- Socialist Labour Party (Ireland)
- Socialist Labour Party (UK)
- Socialist Labour Party (UK, 1903)
- Socialist Labour Party of Croatia
- Socialist Labour Party of Greece
- Socialist Labour Party of Yugoslavia (Communists)
- Socialist Party of Labour, Romania

== See also ==
- Socialist Labor Party Hall in Vermont, United States
- List of socialist parties
