= Karl Buchwald =

German politician and trade unionist

Karl Buchwald (1889 – ?) was a German politician and trade unionist.

Buchwald was born in a working-class family in the Galician town of Auschwitz on December 4, 1889. He became a trade unionist in 1907. On February 2, 1919, he joined the Independent Social Democratic Party of Germany (USPD) and became the local party chairman in Königshütte (present-day Chorzów in Poland). He became a functionary of the German Metal Workers' Union (DMV) in July 1920, serving as the vice area director. 1922–1935 he served as in different posts in the union in Eastern Upper Silesia, eventually becoming the secretary of the regional unit.

Following the integration of Upper Silesia into Poland, Buchwald became a member of the German Social Democratic Party of Poland (DSDP). He was elected to the Silesian Sejm in 1922, and in the Sejm he joined the German Club. In 1926 he joined the club of the Polish Socialist Party (PPS) instead. Between 1930 and 1935 he served as a member of the Upper Silesia party leadership of the German Socialist Labour Party of Poland (DSAP).

In 1935 he broke away from the DSAP. The break with the party was provoked by developments in the trade union field. On March 3, 1935, a delegate conference of DMV in Upper Silesia was held at which Buchwald called for dissolving the union and merging with the Trade Union of German Workers in Poland (GDA) in its place (an initiative of the German Labour Front in Gleiwitz). Later the same month Buchwald was included in the GDA leadership.
