= Whatfix =

Digital adoption platform in India

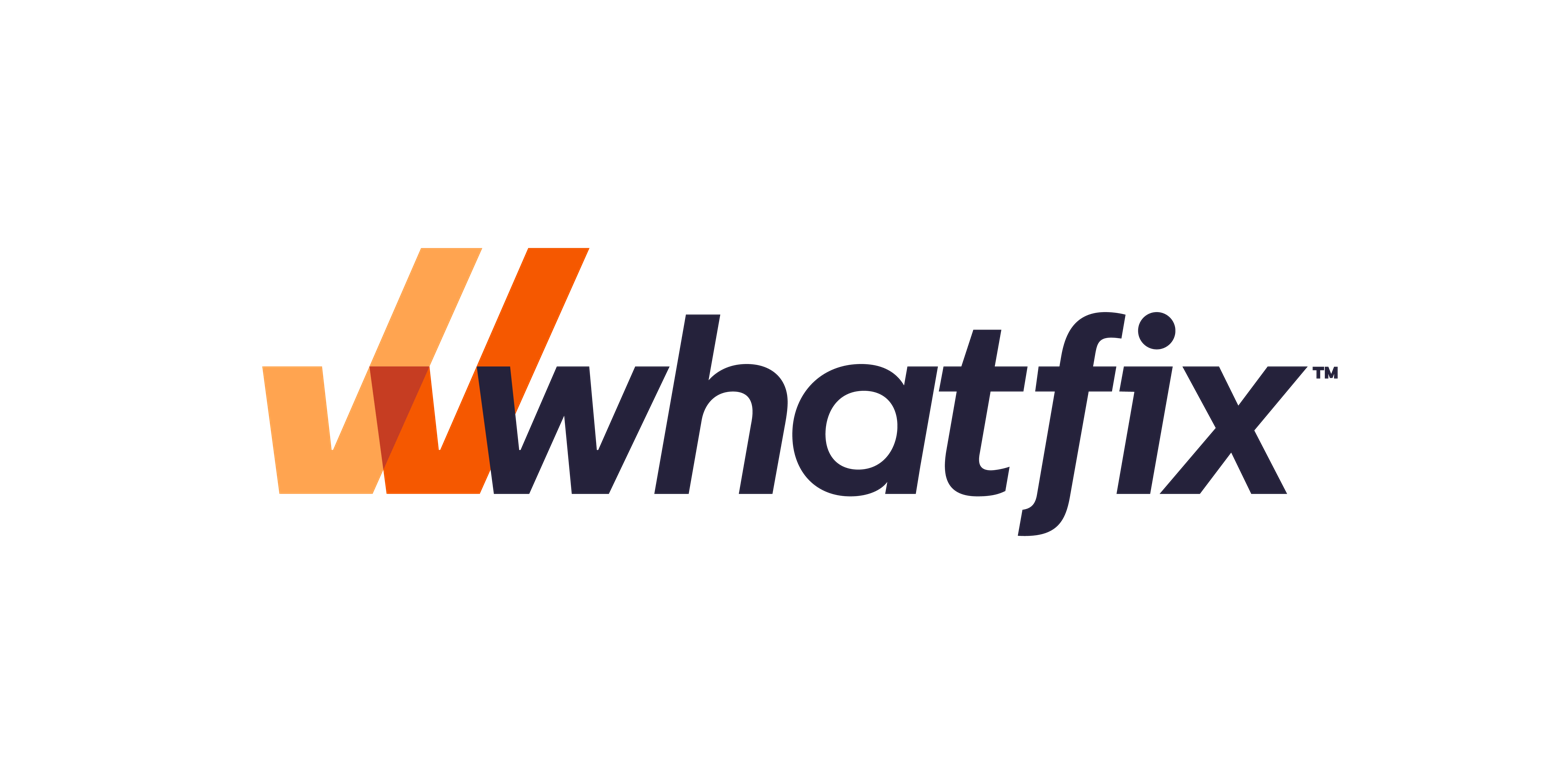
- Type: Private
- Industry: Internet
- Founded: 2014; 12 years ago
- Headquarters: San Jose, California and Bengaluru, India
- Key people: Khadim Batti (CEO), Vara Kumar (Head of R&D and Solutions)
- Number of employees: 500-1000
- Website: whatfix.com

Whatfix is an Indian SaaS-based digital adoption platform that provides in-app guidance, training, and performance support for web applications and software products. The company is headquartered in San Jose, California, United States and Bengaluru, Karnataka, India.

== History ==
Whatfix was co-founded by Khadim Batti and Vara Kumar, the service was initially developed as a search and social media engagement platform for small businesses. In 2014, the company eventually pivoted to an interactive guidance platform for businesses, and was named Whatfix.

In January 2018, the company announced that veteran Silicon Valley investor Vispi Daver had moved from the board of the company and joined the executive team.

In October 2019, Whatfix acquired AI platform Airim. They acquired the learning management system Nittio Learn in August 2021 and the mobile assistance platform Leap.is in April 2022.

In February 2023, Whatfix launched its product analytics tool for user behavior and event tracking. In February 2024, it launched Whatfix Mirror, an AI simulation and roleplay software for hands-on employee training.

== Funding ==
Whatfix has raised a total of $264.2 million in multiple rounds of funding.

- In April 2015, Whatfix raised $1 million in seed funding led by Powerhouse Ventures, GSF Accelerator, and several angel investors. In 2017, the company raised $3.7 million in Series A funding from Helion Ventures.
- In 2019, Whatfix secured $12.5 million in its Series B round.
- In February 2020, the company raised $32 million in its Series C round.
- In June 2021, Whatfix raised $90 million in Series D funding, led by SoftBank Vision Fund 2.
- In September 2024, Whatfix secured $125 million in its Series E round of funding, led by Warburg Pincus with participation from SoftBank Vision Fund 2, increasing its valuation by over 50%.

In July 2021, Whatfix implemented an Employee Stock Ownership Plan (ESOP) buyback of $4.3 million (₹320,000,000) for its employees. In October 2024, the company announced a $58 million (₹485 crores) liquidity event, providing liquidity to its employees and early investors.

== Product ==
Whatfix focuses on software adoption, user onboarding, employee training, and performance support for enterprise web, desktop, and mobile applications. In 2023, the company launched its new product analytics line. In 2024, it launched its system simulation and AI roleplay training platform.

Whatfix is ISO 27001:2013 certified, SCORM 1.2 and DITA compliant, and SOC 2 certified.
