= The Ancient Ship =

1987 novel by Zhang Wei

- cover of the 2008 English translation
- Author: Zhang Wei
- Original title: 古船 Gu Chuan
- Translator: Howard Goldblatt (2008)
- Language: Chinese
- Set in: 20th-century Shandong
- Publication date: 1986/1987
- Publication place: China

The Ancient Ship (Chinese: 古船) is a Chinese novel by Zhang Wei, first published in 1986. The novel spans four decades of Chinese history beginning with the creation of the People's Republic in 1949, then difficult periods of land reform, as well as famine, the Cultural Revolution and the Great Leap Forward. It is the story of three generations, the Sui, Zhao and Li families who live through these difficult times. The novel is set in the fictional northern town of Wali which once had a thriving river and docks, but whose river shrank to the point of being unnavigable. The title refers to an ancient ship that is discovered buried in the floodplain adjacent to the city. An English translation by Howard Goldblatt was published by HarperCollins in 2008.

== Plot ==
Set in the fictional Shandong town of Wali, the novel explores the enduring culture and psychology of the Chinese people.

The plot is non-linear and events move into and out of and around certain events in the first forty years of the People's Republic of China. Although these events, as a background to the ancient patterns of the struggle for survival in Wali are almost inconsequential, they also have profound repercussions.

Although the reader might identify the struggle for land reform, the Great Leap Forward, the Cultural Revolution, the Sino-Vietnamese war and the "reform and opening up", these milestones in the history of contemporary China are unmarked, their anonymity serving to deny, for the author, that linear time has any meaning or relevance for the ebb and flow of Chinese life.

Liberation in 1949 and the period of the Five Year Plans are referred to in passing as "By then an earthshaking change had occurred in our land, characterized mainly by pervasive turmoil. The people were confident that it would take only a few years to overtake England and catch up to America" (p. 9).

The masking of such familiar milestones and the moving backwards and forwards between them simultaneously upsets the Western mind's reliance on a linear time structure and brings to the fore a concentration on what the author sees as innate Chinese characteristics that are as much a part of the Chinese mind as ancient walls and ancient ships are part of its landscape.

The dominating motif of the novel is an imposing and ancient glass noodle factory. Its presence is felt in the same way as the distillery in Red Sorghum and the silk dyeing plant in Ju Dou. In so far as Wali might be a microcosm for all of China, the factory can be taken to symbolise China's industrial infrastructure: the struggle for control of the factory between the Sui and Zhao clans mirrors the struggle for control of the means of production unleashed by Deng Xiaoping's economic reforms.

Although his family has lost its control of the factory to the Zhaos, Sui Baopu sits at his machine each day, ignoring events in the village and refusing younger brother Sui Jiansu's earnest calls for rising up against the Zhao's and reclaiming the factory. Baopu represents a compliant working class, still in the grip of the Communist Manifesto, but unable or unwilling to follow its call to action.

Their uncle, the seafaring Sui Buzhao further blurs the reality of time, suffering delusions about being in the company of, and having conversations with, the Ming Admiral Zheng He whose navigating manual fulfils his spiritual needs just as the Manifesto does for Baopu.

Surrounded by corruption, a lone Party street committee secretary rails against the abuse of power by higher ups and always pays for his tickets to the movies. This quality, together with Buzhao's selfless act at the novel's end, is the key to the town's survival and growth and is the human equivalent of the underground waters that promise to rejuvenate the town's dying river.
