= 1922 Silesian Parliament election =

- 24 September 1922
- All 48 seats in the Silesian Sejm; 25 seats needed for a majority
Party	Vote %	Seats
National Bloc	33.54	18
German lists	21.66	12
Polish Socialist Party	16.94	8
National Workers' Party	14.28	7
German Social Democratic Party	5.12	2
Polish People's Party	3.97	1
This lists parties that won seats. See the complete results below.
Results by constituency
Marshal of the Sejm before	Marshal of the Sejm after
Janina Omańkowska; PSChD	Konstanty Wolny; PSChD

Parliamentary elections were held in the Silesian Voivodeship on 24 September 1922 to elect deputies to the Silesian Sejm.

== Results ==
Party or alliance		Votes	%	Seats
National Bloc		129,679	33.54	18
Germans	German Catholic People's Party	50,691	13.11	6
Germans	German Party	33,059	8.55	6
Germans	Total	83,750	21.66	12
Polish Socialist Party		65,493	16.94	8
National Workers' Party		55,198	14.28	7
German Social Democratic Party		19,789	5.12	2
Polish People's Party		15,345	3.97	1
Communists		9,044	2.34	0
Others		8,294	2.15	0
Total		386,592	100.00	48
Valid votes		386,592	99.44	
Invalid/blank votes		2,177	0.56	
Total votes		388,769	100.00	
Registered voters/turnout		527,228	73.74	
Source: "Rocznik Statystyki Rzeczypospolitej Polskiej R. 1, cz. 2 (1920/1922)".
