= Scale Venture Partners =

American venture capital firm

- Type: Private
- Industry: Venture capital
- Predecessor: BA Venture Partners
- Founded: 2000; 26 years ago
- Headquarters: Foster City, California, U.S.
- Products: Investments
- Total assets: US$1.9 billion
- Website: www.scalevp.com

Scale Venture Partners is an early-stage venture capital firm based in Foster City, California., that invests primarily in Series A and Series B funding rounds. Since its founding, the firm has invested in more than 380 technology companies, including Cloud, SaaS, and infrastructure companies. Of these investments, 159 have resulted in exits, including IPOs for companies like Bill.com, Box, DocuSign, HubSpot, RingCentral, Root Insurance, and WalkMe.

Scale has focused on investments in areas including Cloud, AI, machine learning, data, DataOps, DevOps, digital health, Fintech, open source software, productivity tools, vertical SaaS, security, and AI-enabled applications.

Scale offers a Scaling Platform that uses executive networks, go-to-market playbooks, private communities, and Scale Studio benchmarks to help startups founder-led growth to a repeatable go-to-market machine.

In 2018, the firm launched Scale Studio, a data product designed to analyze and benchmark SaaS metrics such as growth, efficiency, churn, and cash burn.

== History ==
The firm was founded in 2000 as BA Venture Partners, and functioned as the venture capital arm of Bank of America, where it raised its first two funds.

In 2007, the firm spun out from Bank of America and changed its name to Scale Venture Partners. Scale's $600 million Fund VII was launched in December 2020.

== SaaS and cloud investments ==
Scale invests in enterprise software startups that are between $500,000 – $5,000,000 in annual revenue, within SaaS and Cloud, Scale focuses on markets like: AI and ML, productivity, open source, cybersecurity, dev-ops, big data and automation for industries that have traditionally been low-tech.

Investments include:

- Bill.com
- Box.com
- CircleCI
- CloudHealth
- DemandBase
- Docusign
- ExactTarget
- Expel
- Forter
- Honeycomb
- Hubspot
- JFrog
- KeepTruckin
- Locus Robotics
- Omniture
- OneLogin
- PAPAYA Global
- PerimiterX
- RingCentral
- Root
- Scout RFP
- Socure
- Spruce
- Treasure Data
- WalkMe
- Wrike

== Scale Studio – SaaS metrics and benchmarks ==
Scale Studio is a free data-product that launched in July 2018 that analyzes financials and operating metrics from 1000+ private companies and provides SaaS-metrics and benchmarks for startup “Vital Signs” like: growth, efficiency, churn and burn.

The platform asks users to input their financial and operational data, and then produces a report which benchmarks performance against thousands of quarters of data from similar companies.
