= Suin =

Suin may refer to:

- Suin, Rajasthan, a village in Rajasthan, India
- Suin, Saône-et-Loire, a commune in the French region of Bourgogne
- Sudanese Universities Information Network, a national research and education network

== Korean rail lines ==
- Suin Line (1937–1945), a narrow gauge line of the Chōsen Railway in Gyeonggi Province
- Suin Line, a metro line of the Seoul Metropolitan Subway serving the Seoul Capital Area, active 2012–2020
- Suin–Bundang Line, a commuter rail service of the Seoul Metropolitan Subway system, opened in 2020
