= Sui Prefecture =

Sui Prefecture may refer to:

- Suizhou (隨州), a prefecture-level city in Hubei, a prefecture since the 6th century
- Suizhou (in modern Shaanxi) (綏州), a prefecture between the 6th and 11th centuries

== See also ==
- Sui (disambiguation)
