= Siegmund Glücksmann =

German-Jewish socialist politician

- Born: 30 May 1884; Radocza, Austria-Hungary (now Poland)
- Died: 6 October 1942 (aged 58); Bukhara, Uzbek SSR
- Education: Jagiellonian University
- Occupations: Political activist, army officer, lawyer, teacher
- Political party: Jewish Social Democratic Party

Siegmund Glücksmann (30 May 1884 – 6 October 1942) was a German-Jewish socialist politician. In the 1920s and 1930s, he was one of the most prominent figures of the German minority socialist movement in Poland, functioned as its 'party ideologue' and represented the more Marxist oriented wing of the movement.

== Biography ==
=== Student life and entry into political activism ===
Glücksmann studied secondary school in Wadowitz, where he joined a socialist students organization. In 1905 he shifted to Kraków to study Law at the Jagiellonian University. He worked with socialist publications, and in 1910 he became a member of the Jewish Social Democratic Party (ŻPSD).

In 1911 the Jewish Social Democracy in Galicia, the Jewish affiliate section of the Polish Social Democratic Party of Galicia, merged into the ŻPSD. Glücksmann became a member of the Executive of the unified ŻPSD.

=== War and Post-war ===
In 1913 Glücksmann began post-graduate studies in Law. Glücksmann's university studies were however interrupted by the outbreak of the First World War. Glücksmann became an officer, commanding over a company of carabiners. Glücksmann was wounded in the war, and settled down in Bielsko (Bielitz). In Bielsko, he opened an attorney's office of his own.

In Bielsko he became associated with the German intellectuals of the town. He was elected to the town council. In 1920 he was active in the Social Democratic electoral bloc 'Forward'. He was a leading figure of the Austrian Social Democratic Party in Bielsko, and worked with its press organ Volksstimme. In 1922, he managed to merge the Bielitz branch of the Austrian Social Democratic Party with the German Social Democratic party organizations in Upper Silesia, forming the German Social Democratic Party (DSDP). The DSDP sought to organize German socialists throughout the Polish republic. The DSDP later evolved, after a series of mergers, into the German Socialist Labour Party in Poland (DSAP).

=== Role as party ideologue ===
After Józef Piłsudski's (a former socialist who would become a Marshal of Poland) coming to power (during the May Coup in 1926), Glücksmann argued for opposition against the new regime and claimed that Piłsudski had abandoned socialism. The first joint protests by DSAP and the Polish Socialist Party (PPS) were organized on Glücksmann's initiative. In the 1930s he argued in favour of cooperation with the Communist Party of Poland and in 1934 he urged the DSAP to struggle jointly with the communists against fascism.

=== Rise of fascism ===
Glücksmann welcomed the Popular Front line adopted by the 7th congress of the Communist International in 1935. In Bielsko, local National Socialists began a campaign of harassment against Glücksmann. As a result, Glücksmann resigned from his position as the chairman of the DSAP organization in the Bielsko subdistrict. The attacks against the party did however not decline.

=== Exile and death ===
In September 1939, Glücksmann and his family fled to Volhynia and from there to Lwów (Lemberg or Lviv). In Lwów he began working as an Arithmetics teacher. In the fall of 1940, once the area was taken over by the Soviets following the Soviet invasion of Poland, he was deported to Yoshkar-Ola, where he worked as a woodcutter. After the Sikorski-Mayski Agreement between the Polish government in exile and the Soviets, Glücksmann was free to leave Yoshkar-Ola and in the fall of 1941 he moved to Bukhara. He died in typhoid at a Bukhara hospital on 6 October 1942. His wife and children later returned to Poland, and would eventually migrate to Sweden.
