= Jay Vijayan =

Indian-American entrepreneur

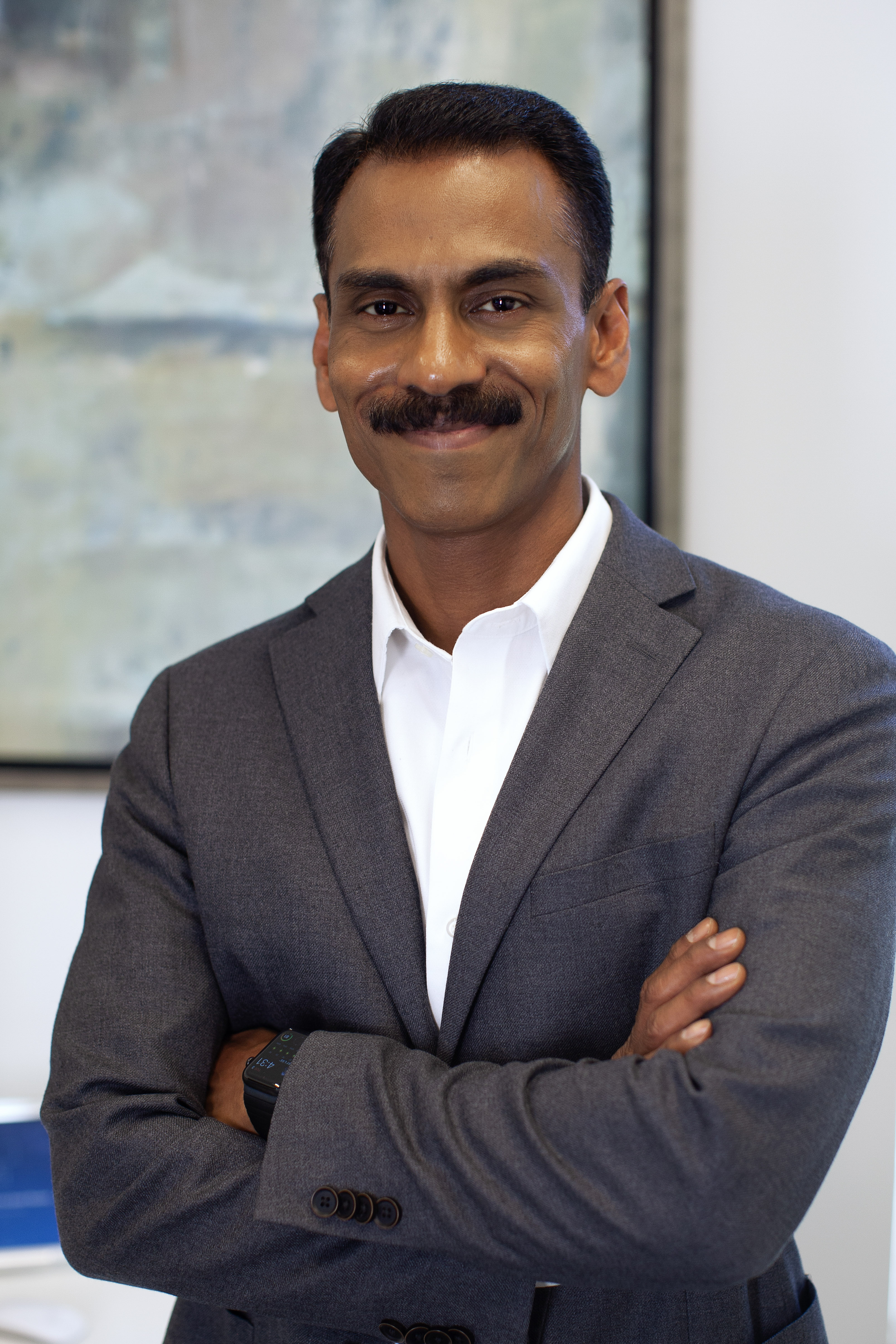
- Born: Jayaprakash Vijayan; 1971 or 1972 (age 54–55); Madras, Tamil Nadu, India
- Citizenship: United States
- Education: University of Madras (B.Sc., M.Sc.)
- Occupations: Founder & CEO, Tekion Corp

Jayaprakash "Jay" Vijayan (born 1971 or 1972) is an Indian-American entrepreneur, engineer, inventor, and investor. He is the founder and CEO of Tekion Corp, a U.S.-based automotive retail technology company that uses artificial intelligence in its platform. Prior to founding Tekion, he served as chief information officer (CIO) at Tesla Motors. He also worked for VMware and Oracle.

== Early life and education ==
Jay was born in Chennai, into a Tamil family, to K. Vijayan and V. Umadevi. His father operated a computer science training and coaching institute in the city. Jay completed his education at AVM Matriculation and Avichi Higher Secondary Schools. Subsequently, he pursued his higher studies at the University of Madras in Chennai, where he earned both a Bachelor of Science and a Master of Science degree.

== Career ==
Jay started his career at an IT firm before moving to Singapore and finally to the United States. He joined City Developments Limited, a private company headquartered in Singapore, and also completed Oracle database certification programs. He worked at Oracle in the US from 1999 to 2007 as a programmer, and later a senior manager.

In 2007, Jay left Oracle for VMware, a California-based cloud computing and virtualization technology company, where he served as senior director from 2007 to 2012. He led the application development of all business applications for VMware. In 2012, VMware reported a revenue of US$3.77 billion.

From 2012 to 2016, Jay served as the CIO at Tesla Motors. In this role, he reported directly to CEO Elon Musk. Jay and his team were responsible for managing Tesla's digital and information systems. He is credited with building Warp, Tesla's home-grown ERP system. It integrates e-commerce and back-end management software, designed to support Tesla's direct approach to selling and servicing cars.

In early 2016, Jay left Tesla to found Tekion Corp, a SaaS company that operated in stealth mode up until late 2019. In 2020, Tekion Corp raised $150 million as part of its series C funding round led by private equity firm Advent International. In 2021, Tekion secured $250 million in a Series D financing round from Alkeon Capital and Durable Capital, resulting in a valuation of over $3.5 billion. In July 2024, Jay announced that his company raised $200 million from Dragoneer Investment Group, bringing its valuation to over $4 billion.

Car companies such as General Motors, Hyundai Motors, Renault–Nissan–Mitsubishi, Exor, the parent company of Stellantis, which owns Citroën, Fiat, Jeep, Maserati, Ram Trucks, as well as Ferrari, and BMWi Ventures have also invested in Tekion.

Jay served on the board of NIC Inc., a digital government service provider for U.S. federal and state governments, He is currently the Chairperson of the Board at Tekion Corp.

== Awards and recognition ==
In 2014, Jay received the Tamil American Pioneer – Lifetime Achievement Award for Excellence in Engineering/Science from the Federation of Tamil Sangams of North American.

Jay has several patents granted by the United States Patent and Trademark Office (USPTO).

In 2023, he was recognized as an Automotive News All-Star for Digital Retail by Automotive News.

== Personal life ==
As of November 2014, Jay lives in Palo Alto with his wife and two children. He oversees Tekion’s global corporate social responsibility (CSR) initiatives.
