= Fesser =

Fesser is a surname. Notable people with the surname include:

- Franciszek Fesser (1885–1956), Polish politician
- Guillermo Fesser (born 1960), Spanish journalist
- Javier Fesser (born 1964), Spanish film director
- Klaus Fesser, German physicist

== See also ==
- Feser
