= DSDP =

DSDP may refer to:

- Deep Sea Drilling Project, an ocean drilling project operated from 1968 to 1983
- Deutsche Sozialdemokratische Partei, a former political party in Poland, formed in 1922
