= Dragoneer Investment Group =

American investment firm

Dragoneer Investment Group, LLC
- Type: Private
- Industry: Investment management
- Founded: 2012; 14 years ago
- Founder: Marc Stad
- Headquarters: Letterman Digital Arts Center, San Francisco, California, U.S.
- Products: Hedge fund; Venture capital
- AUM: US$22.6 billion (2024)
- Number of employees: 83 (2024)
- Website: dragoneer.com

The Dragoneer Investment Group (Dragoneer) is an American investment firm based in San Francisco, California. The firm focuses on technology investments in both public and private markets globally.

== Background ==
Dragoneer is based in San Francisco and was founded in 2012 by Marc Stad. Stad was an investment professional who had previously worked at the Investment Group of Santa Barbara, TPG Capital and McKinsey & Company.

Dragoneer describes itself as a growth-oriented investment firm with more than $17 billion in long-duration capital from institutional funds such as endowments, foundations, sovereign wealth funds and family offices.

For public markets, Dragoneer manages long-only strategy funds that invests in technology companies.

For private markets, Dragoneer manages private growth equity funds that provides funding to private technology companies. The firm avoids going through the traditional fundraising method and instead tries other methods such as secondary stock sales or using convertible debt notes.

== SPAC deals ==
In August 2020, Dragoneer Growth Opportunities Corp was listed on the New York Stock Exchange (Ticker: DGNR) raising $600 million. DGNR is a SPAC which is a blank-check company. On February 3, 2021, it was announced that auto insurance IT provider, CCC Information Services would become a listed company by merging with DGNR in a deal worth $7 billion.

In November 2020, a second SPAC, Dragoneer Growth Opportunities Corp II was listed on the Nasdaq (Ticker: DGNS) raising $240 million. In July 2021, Cvent became a listed company by merging with DGNS in a deal worth $5.3 billion.

In March 2021, a third SPAC, Dragoneer Growth Opportunities Corp III was listed on the Nasdaq (Ticker: DGNU) raising $400 million.

== Funds ==
Fund	Vintage Year
Dragoneer Global Fund	2012
Dragoneer Opportunities Fund	2014
Dragoneer Opportunities Fund II	2015
Dragoneer Global Fund II	2015
Dragoneer Opportunities Fund III	2017
Dragoneer Opportunities Fund IV	2019

== Notable venture capital investments ==
- Airbnb
- Alibaba Group
- Anthropic
- AppFolio
- Atlassian
- Chime
- Compass, Inc.
- CRED
- Databricks
- Discord
- Dollar Shave Club
- Domo
- DoorDash
- Etsy
- Flipkart
- Glassdoor
- Gusto
- HackerOne
- Hortonworks
- Instacart
- Klarna
- MercadoLibre
- Metropolis Technologies
- New Relic
- Nubank
- OpenAI
- Procore
- Redfin
- ResearchGate
- Roblox
- Slack
- Snapchat
- Snowflake
- Spotify
- Strava
- Tekion Corp
- Uber
- UiPath
- Waymo
- Wealthfront
- Whatfix
