= Miao Miao (actress) =

Chinese actress

- 苗苗
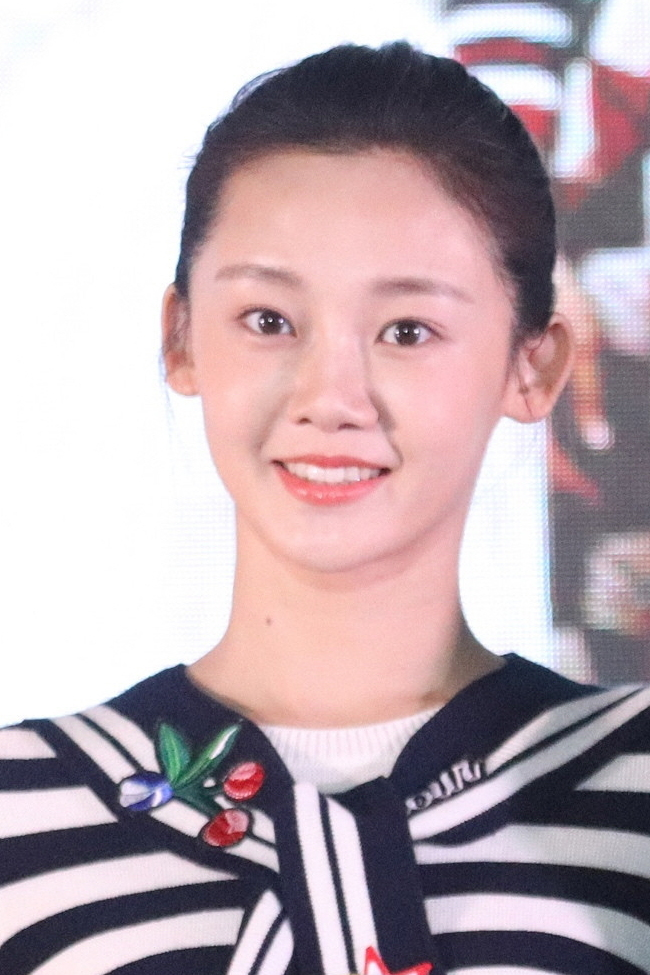
- Miao in 2017
- Born: November 29, 1988 (age 37); Nanyang, Henan, China
- Education: Beijing Dance Academy
- Occupation: Actress
- Years active: 2007–present
- Height: 167 cm (5 ft 6 in)
- Spouse: Zheng Kai (m. 2020)
- Children: 2 (daughter and son)

Miao Miao (Chinese: 苗苗; pinyin: Miáo Miáo; born 29 November 1988), also known by her stage name Vivi Miao, is a Chinese actress. She made her acting debut in the TV drama Who Is Lying (2007), and has since gone on to appear in numerous film titles such as Youth (2017) and The Best Is Yet to Come (2020).

== Early life ==
Miao was born on 1988 in the city of Nanyang in Henan Province, and also grew up there. She started dancing at the age of six and in 1999, she entered the High School Affiliated to Beijing Dance Academy, where she majored in Chinese dance. In 2005, she was admitted to the Beijing Dance Academy, where she graduated in 2009 with a major in classical dance.

== Career ==
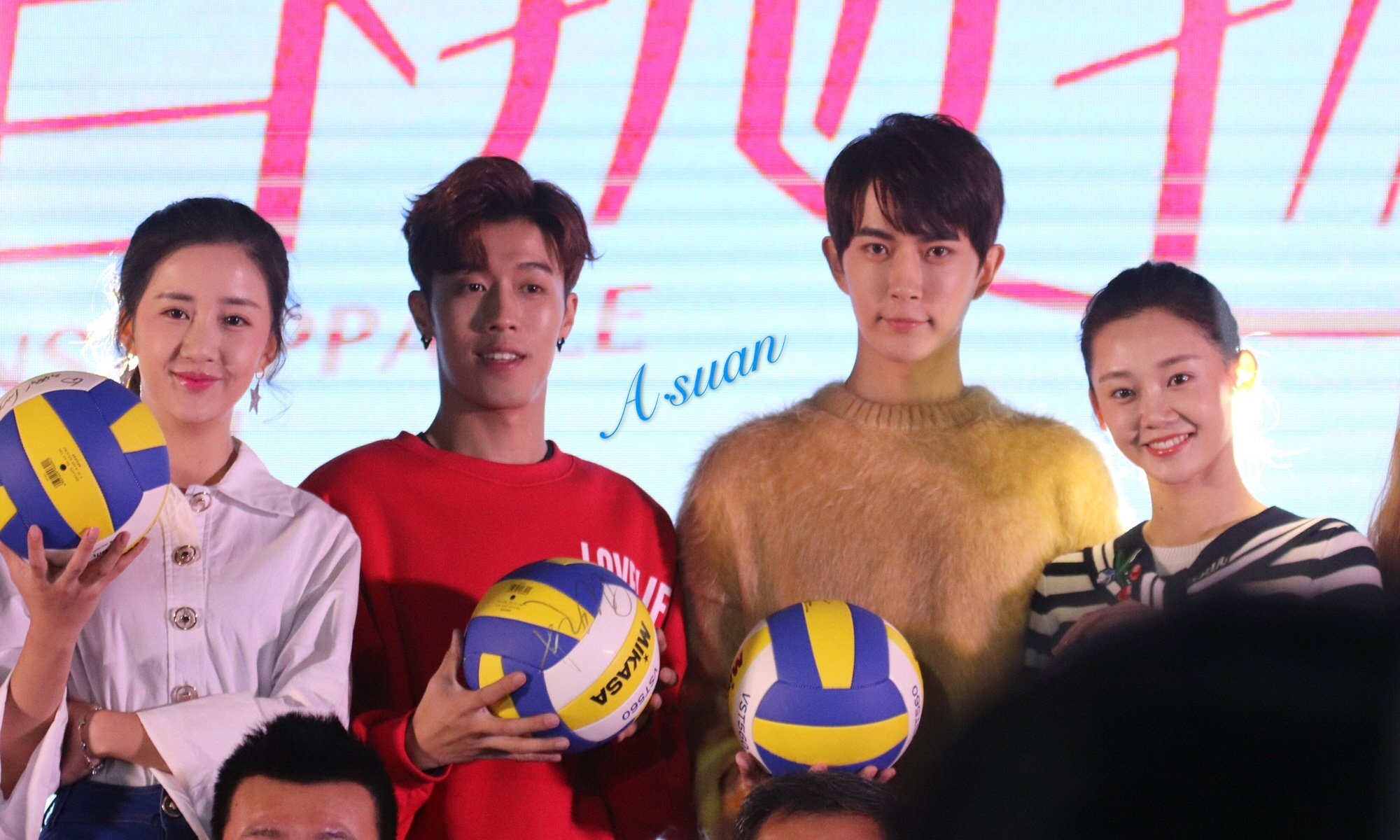
Miao (far right) at the presentation of the TV drama Unstoppable Youth (2017)

In 2007, Miao made her acting debut in the Chinese TV drama Who Is Lying, where she played the role of Yi Chuchu. In 2008, she starred in the war drama Proof of Identity, which was directed by Mao Weining.

In 2009, following her graduation from the Beijing Dance Academy, Miao was selected as a dancer by the General Political Song and Dance Troupe in the People's Liberation Army. On the same year, she participated in the Shanxi Rap Stage, one of the important repertoires of the Central Propaganda Department and the Ministry of Culture of China, during the 60th anniversary of the founding of the People's Republic of China. She participated in the play Liberation and toured with the cast to various theaters for the play's performance. In 2013, for her performance in the play Railway Guerrilla, Miao received the silver award at the 9th Lotus Cup Dance, Drama and Poetry Performance.

In 2017, she starred in the TV drama The Peach Blossom, where she played the role of Tao Rui. On the same year, she starred in the film Youth, which was directed by Feng Xiaogang and written by Yan Geling. In the film, she played the role of He Xiaoping, a member of the People's Liberation Army Art Troupe. For her performance in the film, Miao received the Best Newcomer Awards at the 25th Beijing College Student, Chinese (Ningbo·Cixi).

In 2018, it was announced that she would star in the suspense drama film June, alongside Aaron Kwok. Directed by Wang Yang, the movie talks about an aspiring cellist who grows up in New York's Chinatown and her life being turned upside-down when she discovers a secret about her father. On 23 August 2019, she took part as a guest in the cultural experience program Meet the Temple of Heaven. From 2019 to 2020, she starred as a main character in the TV drama Unstoppable Youth. From 2020, she is currently starring in the TV drama If There Is No Tomorrow, which is broadcast on Chinese OTT platforms iQIYI, Tencent Video and Youku.

On 28 May 2021, she participated in the fifth season of Chinese variety show Keep Running, a spin-off from the popular original South Korean variety show Running Man.

== Personal life ==
In June 2018, Miao was invited to serve as the Ocean Public Welfare Ambassador on World Ocean Day and on 2019, she was made an ambassador of Serbian tourism in China. In July 2021, she donated CN¥ 1.5 million for the victims of 2021 Henan floods.

On 21 May 2020, Miao announced that she married actor Zheng Kai and on October 23, she gave birth to her daughter. On 21 April 2022, Miao announced that she was pregnant with her second child. On 1 June 2022, she gave birth to her son.

== Filmography ==
=== Films ===
Year	Title	Role	Notes
2014	All About Puberty		
2016	Gone for Nothing: Uniqueness	Chen Wuyang	
2016	So Young 2: Never Gone	High School Student	
2017	You Jia	Cai Hong	
2017	Youth	He Xiaoping	
2017	I Dedicate My Youth To You	Herself	Documentary on the making of the film Youth
2018	Waiting For Me In Heaven	Woman in the Earthquake	
2020	The Best Is Yet to Come	Xiao Zhu	
2021	Bloom of Youth		
2024	749 Bureau	Xia Hua	
TBA	June	Wang Jun	

=== Television ===
Year	Title	Role	Notes
1997	Happy Camp	Herself (guest)	Episode No. 1008
2007	Who Is Lying	Yi Chuchu	
2008	Proof of Identity	Qu Si	
2017	The Peach Blossom	Tao Rui	
2017	Ice Fantasy	Ming Le	
2017	Princess Agents	Jin Xiaoqi	
2019	From Survivor to Healer	Sun Shu	42 episodes
2019-2020	Unstoppable Youth	Yi Anle	40 episodes
2019	Meet the Temple of Heaven	Herself (guest)	
2020–present	If There Is No Tomorrow	Luan Bingran	
2021	Love Changes	Li Yiran	
2021	Keep Running	Herself (guest)	Season 9, Episode 6
2023	Gone Grandma		
TBA	Eagle Dance and Sword	Li Kexin	
