= Zhang Wei (author) =

Chinese author (born 1956)

- 张炜
- Born: November 7, 1956 (age 69); Longkou, Shandong, China
- Education: Shandong Normal University
- Occupation: Novelist
- Writing career
- Language: Chinese
- Period: 1982 - present
- Genre: Novel
- Notable work: The Ancient Ship
- Notable awards: 8th Mao Dun Literary Prize; 2011 The Ancient Ship

Zhang Wei (simplified Chinese: 张炜; traditional Chinese: 張煒; pinyin: Zhāng Wěi; born 7 November 1956) is a Chinese author.

== Biography ==
He was born in Longkou, Yantai, which is located in the north of the Shandong Peninsula. He graduated from the Chinese Department at Yantai Normal College in 1980. Three years later, he became a member of China Writers Association, an organization for which he has served as chairman and deputy chairman of the Shandong branch.

Wei is best known for his novels The Ancient Ship and September's Fable.

In 2011 Zhang won the Mao Dun Literature Prize, the highest national literary award, for On the Plateau, a 10-volume work that took a decade to write.

== Works ==
- The Ancient Ship 《古船》(1987)
- Seven Kinds of Mushrooms 《蘑菇七种》 (1988)
- September's Fable 《九月寓言》(1993)
- Songs from the Forest《刺猬歌》(2007)
- On the Plateau 《你在高原》(2010)

=== Children's books ===
(The English titles are approximate)

- Life on the Peninsula 《半岛哈里哈气》(2012)
- The Young Boy and the Sea 《少年与海》(2017)
- Looking for the King of Fish 《寻找鱼王》
