= Dapp =

Dapp or DAPP may refer to:

== People ==
- Scot Dapp (born 1951), former American football and baseball coach

== Places ==
- Dapp, Alberta, a hamlet in Canada

== Science and technology ==
- DAPP, a compound used as a radioligand that binds to the serotonin transporter
- Data Acquisition and Processing Program, former name of the US Defense Meteorological Satellite Program
- Decentralized application (DApp, dApp, Dapp, or dapp), a computer application
- Dimensional Assessment of Personality Pathology, a psychological assessment; See Schedule for Nonadaptive and Adaptive Personality
- Distributed application, software that is executed or run on multiple computers within a network

== Other uses ==
- Dapp, character on the Japanese TV show Gekisou Sentai Carranger
- Development Aid from People to People, charitable organization alleged to be run by Danish confederation Tvind
- Dapp (card game), German dialect name for the card game of Tapp

== See also ==
- Dap (disambiguation)
