= Monarch Industry =

- 上陽賦
- Genre: Costume drama
- Based on: “Di Wang Ye” 帝王业 by MeiYuZhe
- Written by: Luo Song, Song Jinchuan
- Directed by: Hou Yong, Cheng Yuanhai
- Starring: Zhang Ziyi; Zhou Yiwei; Tony Yang
- Country of origin: China
- Original language: Standard Chinese
- No. of seasons: 1
- No. of episodes: 68

Production
- Producer: Dai Xiaorui
- Production locations: Hengdian, Tang Dynasty City, Xiangcheng
- Running time: 45 minutes

Original release
- Network: Changsha News Channel; Youku
- Release: January 9, 2021

Monarch Industry (Chinese: 上陽賦; pinyin: Shàngyáng Fù, also dubbed The Rebel Princess) is a 2021 Chinese fictional costume drama. This drama is adapted from MeiYuZhe’s novel Di Wang Ye, and stars Zhang Ziyi, Zhou Yiwei, Tony Yang, Kara Wai, and Angie Chiu.

The drama was filmed between February and November 2018. It began broadcasting on Changsha News Channel on 8 January 2021, and on Youku on January 9, 2021.

== Synopsis ==
The story is set against the fictional Cheng Dynasty involving the imperial Ma family and the noble clans; Wang clan of Langya and Xie clan of Chen. The royal family is supported by both the Wang and Xie clans for generations which results in recurring clashes for power whilst disregarding the wellbeing of the common people. Wang Xuan (played by Zhang Ziyi), and her first love, the third prince, Ma Zitan (played by Tony Yang), are childhood sweethearts that are madly in love. They wish to get married but are faced with multiple setbacks because of a prophecy that states, "to acquire a lady from the Wang clan is to obtain the world."

Wang Xuan is ultimately coerced into marrying an accomplished general from the peasant class, Xiao Qi (played by Zhou Yiwei) who was bestowed the title Prince of Yuzhang. Xiao Qi is well aware that he commands 200,000 Ningshuo soldiers and is at risk of becoming a pawn in the struggle for power. He takes an extreme measure to avoid this by abruptly rushing out of the capital in the middle of the wedding banquet, leaving Wang Xuan ashamed, disheartened and insulted. The two were separated due to the awkward start of their marriage amidst rising political turmoil. Wang Xuan is eventually moved by Xiao Qi's ambition to bring peace and prosperity to the common people. She finally decides to accept Xiao Qi who provides her with the freedom she is used to as she discovers her own calling and learns to cope with her prestigious yet complicated family, maturing into a lady in her own right. They gradually fall in love while overcoming various conflicting identities/roles/responsibilities, ethical dilemmas and political schemes to create a new era of stability.

== Cast ==
=== Main ===
- Zhang Ziyi as Wang Xuan (A’Wu), Princess Shangyang → the Princess Consort of Yuzhang
  - The daughter of Wang Lin and Princess Jinmin
- Zhou Yiwei as Xiao Qi, the General of the Ningshuo Army → the Prince of Yuzhang → the Prince Regent
- Tony Yang as Ma Zitan, the third prince → the Prince of Anping → the Emperor
  - The third son of the Emperor by Noble Consort Xie

=== Supporting ===
==== The Imperial Family ====
- Heidi Wang as the late Empress Dowager Xiaomu
- Jiang Kai as Ma Yao, the Emperor
- Shi Ke as Wang Huanxi, the Empress → the Empress Dowager
  - Wang Lin's younger sister; the mother of the Crown Prince
- Kara Wai as Noble Consort Xie
  - Xie Yuan's younger sister; the mother of Zitan
- Guo Jiaming as Ma Zilong, the Crown Prince → the Emperor
  - The eldest son of the Emperor by Empress Wang
- Zuo Xiaoqing as Xie Wanru, Princess Yifang → the Crown Princess → the Empress
  - The daughter of Xie Yuan
- Purba Rgyal as Ma Zilü, the second prince
  - The second son of the Emperor by a lowly consort

==== The Wang clan of Langya ====
- Yu Hewei as Wang Lin, the Duke of Jing; the Prime Minister
- Zhang Xingzhe as Wang Xu
  - Wang Lin's younger brother
- Angie Chiu as Ma Jinruo, Princess Jinmin
  - The Emperor's younger sister; Wang Lin's wife; the mother of Wang Su and Princess Shangyang
- Jia Yiping as Wang Su, the heir to the Duke of Jing → the Prince of Jiangxia
  - The son of Wang Lin and Princess Jinmin
- Chen Jinru as Princess Huan Mi, the heiress consort of Jing
  - The daughter of Huan Changde; Wang Su's wife
- Ceng Yixuan as Wang Qian, Princess Consort Tuo →Queen of Hulan
  - Wang Xuan's cousin
- Liu Yun as Su Jin'er, Princess Shangyang's maid → Noble Consort
- Sui Yuan as Xiao Yuxiu, Princess Shangyang's maid → the Countess of Suyi ° Xiao Qi's adoptive sister
- Cao Jun as Pang Gui, leader of the covert guards of the Wang clan who is loyal to Wang Xuan

==== The Imperial Court ====
- Jiang Tao as Marquess Xie Yuan
- Zheng Wang as Wen Zongshen
- Li Jianxin as Huan Changde, the Duke of Jingyuan
- Liu Duan Duan as Song Huai'en, a lieutenant in the Ningshuo Army → the Count of Suyi
- Hou Xiao as Hu Guanglie, a lieutenant in the Ningshuo Army
- Hai Ling as Hu Yao, a lieutenant in the Ningshuo Army
  - Hu Guanglie's younger sister
- Peng Bo as Tang Jing, a lieutenant in the Ningshuo Army
- Li Yuxuan as Mu Lian

==== Hulan tribe ====
- Yuan Hong as Helan Zhen
  - The illegitimate son of the King of Hulan
- Wang Ruolin as Helan Tuo
  - The nephew of the King of Hulan

== Critical reception ==
The drama was highly anticipated as it was Zhang Ziyi's first foray into television dramas. Chinese netizens criticized that Zhang, who was 38 years old during the production, was portraying a 15-year-old person at the beginning of the show.
