= Digital adoption platform =

Type of enterprise software

A digital adoption platform (DAP), also known as digital adoption solution, is an automated software tool layered on top of an enterprise application or digital product. A DAP is used to guide users in the flow of work with in-app assistance and just-in-time support, ultimately driving adoption.

== Components ==
A digital adoption platform is a software layer that operates between users and a digital application to guide and support application use. A DAP provides automated in-app user guidance with the help of interactive walkthroughs, step-by-step overlays, self-help menus, and contextual information as the user navigates through the application. DAP captures user engagement and workflow information on the backend, which can then be accessed by the organization using analytics.

== History ==
The origins of digital adoption platforms (DAPs) can be traced back to the early 1990s with Electronic Performance Support Systems (EPSS), designed to provide context-sensitive, on-the-job assistance and reduce reliance on traditional training. EPSS systems were mostly focused on ERP and banking applications due to their implementation complexity and the fact that most interfaces were not web-based.

Unlike EPSS, modern DAPs offer seamless in-app overlays and interactivity leveraging the widespread use of HTML based SAAS interfaces. The sector gained momentum in the early 2010s with WalkMe (founded 2012 in Israel), which introduced no-code guidance, tooltips, and behavioral analytics across web applications. In the mid-2010s, a second wave emerged with platforms like Pendo, Whatfix, and Lemon Learning, offering multilingual support, easier deployment, and more focused on usage. In 2013, Toonimo, a DAP, was launched to guide users through websites. By the late 2010s, DAPs increasingly combined in-app guidance with analytics and behavioral insights, using data on software usage to identify where users struggled and improve adoption. In 2017, Apty emerged as a digital adoption platform focused on enterprise software adoption across complex business processes, combining on-screen guidance with usage analytics and process compliance.

Today, digital adoption platforms infuse AI into their products, providing contextual guidance that adapts based on user input, role, or behavior.

== Use cases ==
=== Employee onboarding ===
DAP helps new employees learn how to use the application on the job while they complete tasks using real-time, in-app guidance. DAP can also be considered when an application is newly introduced, upgraded, or consolidated. Customized and contextual automated support provided by a DAP reduces manual support and offline training dependency.

The organization can obtain insights into the effectiveness and efficiency of its application ecosystem, enabling it to understand and fix the shortcomings in its workflows. Businesses can identify application components resulting in sub-optimal employee experience and low productivity and then make the necessary reconfiguration or decide on further employee training. Usage of DAP has reportedly increased user retention and engagement rate, product adoption, and return on investment on internal applications.

=== User onboarding ===
DAP helps new users of a digital product to achieve their Aha moment and help them get their job done (see Jobs to be done framework), using active guiding methods (such as Guided Product Walkthrough, User Onboarding Checklist) or passive guided methods (such as Hotspot Beacons).

The Return on investment is on increased Customer retention. On mobile applications, customer retention rate goes down to around 3% after 30 days post-installation. Nearly 25% users will abandon a mobile application after using it just once. This is an issue because there is a direct link between profitability of a company and the user churn rate.

== Challenges ==
=== Segmentation ===
Different employees of an organization may have different levels of experience in using enterprise software. The DAP, therefore, needs to deliver targeted and segmented guidance to ensure that the user experience does not get impacted by excessive or inadequate guidance information.

== See also ==
- Digital transformation
- User activity monitoring
- Robotic process automation
- Electronic performance support systems
- Web log analysis software
