= WalkMe =

American web-based software company

WalkMe Ltd.
- Available in: English, Multi-language
- Traded as: Nasdaq: WKME
- Headquarters: 350 Mission Street; San Francisco, California, U.S.
- Key people: Dan Adika (CEO); Rafael Sweary (President); Lior Nahary (CFO)
- Industry: SaaS, software, no-code development platform, artificial intelligence, Business process automation
- Products: WalkMe Digital Adoption Platform (DAP)
- Employees: 1,100
- Parent: SAP SE
- Subsidiaries: Abbi, Jaco, DeepUI, Zest
- Website: www.walkme.com
- Launched: April 2012; 14 years ago

WalkMe Ltd. is an American multinational software-as-a-service (SaaS) company, with headquarters in San Francisco, California. Its digital adoption platform (DAP) was recognized in Everest Group's PEAK Matrix Assessment of DAP vendors as the leading DAP product. Alongside its headquarters in San Francisco, the company has offices in Raleigh, North Carolina; Tel Aviv, Israel, and a global footprint including the United Kingdom, Australia, and Japan.

The company's initial public offering (IPO) took place on June 16, 2021, and resulted in a valuation of US$2.56 billion. WalkMe was acquired by SAP for $1.5 billion in 2024; driving SAP’s Business AI strategy was a major motivation for the acquisition.

== History ==
WalkMe Inc. was founded in 2011 by Dan Adika, Rafael Sweary, Eyal Cohen and Yuval Shalom Ozanna. In April 2012, they launched the product WalkMe. In 2016, Globes named it Israel’s most promising start up. In 2017, WalkMe acquired mobile A/B testing and app engagement platform Abbi, and analytics startup Jaco. User interface artificial intelligence company DeepUI.ai was acquired in June 2018, and information enablement tool Zest was acquired in 2021. In June 2021, it had an IPO and was then one of a number of Israeli technology companies to trade below its IPO price.

In June 2024, SAP announced that it has entered into an agreement to acquire WalkMe for $1.5 billion. The acquisition was completed in September 2024. As a result of this, WalkMe was delisted from the NASDAQ.

== Corporate affairs ==
In April 2020, WalkMe and Microsoft announced a partnership in which WalkMe's DAP is embedded in Microsoft Dynamics 365 for customers and partners.

In May 2020, Andrew Casey was appointed as the company's first Chief Financial Officer (CFO).

In October 2020, WalkMe launched its Digital Adoption Institute to the public for providing a scholarship and upskilling courses in digital adoption.

In 2022, revenue was $245 million.

== Products and Technology ==
=== WalkMe Digital Adoption (DAP) ===
Digital adoption platforms provide guidance, in-application training, and user onboarding.

=== WalkMe Learning Arc ===
This allows for learning that is "in-the-flow" where training is delivered directly inside the applications based on user interactions.

=== SAP Joule (formerly WalkMe X) ===
An AI copilot that works across both SAP and non-SAP applications and assists in automating tasks.

== Market Position: AI & Digital Adoption ==
WalkMe is a leader in Digital Adoption when it comes to ensuring that employees are actually using the GenAI tools they’ve invested in, while maintaining security guardrails to prevent the information from being abused.

== Funding ==
WalkMe has raised US$307.5 million in nine rounds of funding. The company was valued at US$2 billion after its Series G round in December 2019.

- In April 2012, WalkMe raised US$1 million in its Series A round, led by Mangrove Capital Partners.
- In October 2012, it raised its Series B funding of US$5.5 million, led by Gemini Israel Ventures.
- In April 2014, WalkMe raised US$11 million in its Series C funding round led by Scale Venture Partners.
- In June 2015, WalkMe raised Series D of US$25 million, led by Greenspring Associates.
- In May 2016 and July 2017, WalkMe raised a total of US$125 million in its Series E round led by Insight Partners.
- In September and November 2018, WalkMe raised Series F funding of US$50 million from Insight Partners and EDBI.
- In December 2019, WalkMe raised US$90 million in its Series G round of funding led by Vitruvian Partners.
- In June 2024 it was announced at SAP Sapphire that a definitive agreement was entered into under which SAP will acquire WalkMe for US $14.00 per share in an all-cash transaction, representing an equity value of approximately US $1.5 billion. The offer price represents a 45% premium to WalkMe’s closing share price on June 4, 2024.
