= Kattowitzer Volkswille =

Kattowitzer Volkswille ('Kattowitz/Katowice People's Will'), generally called just Volkswille, was a German-language Social Democratic newspaper published from Kattowitz (today Katowice). The newspaper was founded in 1916 by the Social Democratic Party of Germany (SPD) politician Otto Braun. Initially, the newspaper carried the devise 'Upper Silesian Free Press - Organ of the Upper Silesia Agitation District of the Social Democratic Party of Germany'.

As Kattowitz/Katowice was transferred to Poland after the Silesian Uprisings, the devise of the newspaper was changed to 'Organ of the German Social Democratic Party of Poland for the Working People'. Volkswille became the central party organ of the German Social Democratic Party of Poland (DSPP), which had been formed out of the remains of SPD, USPD and SDAPÖ branches in areas that were now within the Polish republic. As Upper Silesia was divided between Germany and Poland, a new SPD organ (Oberschlesisches Volksblatt) was founded in the parts of Upper Silesia that remained in Germany.

When the DSPP merged into the German Socialist Labour Party in Poland (DSAP), Lodzer Volkszeitung became the new central party organ of the unified party. Volkswille continued to published though, being the DSAP organ in Katowice. In January 1931 the Bielsko DSAP organ Volksstimme was, due to lack of funds, merged into Volkswille.

In 1933, Volkswille was converted from a daily to a weekly newspaper. The cause was rather simple, the German Machtübernahme meant that financial subventions from Germany for Volkswille ceased. In 1935 all DSAP organs were merged into one, Volkszeitung-Volkswille-Volksstimme, published from Łódź.

== Editors ==
Karl Okonsky became editor of Volkswille on December 12, 1918. Between 1922 and 1924 the editor was Dr. Wilhelm Wolf, chairman of AfA-Bund. From 1924 to 1935 the DSPP chairman Johann Kowoll served as the Volkswille editor.

== Edition ==
In January 1928 Volkswille was estimated to have a daily circulation of about 1,800-1,900. By 1932, the daily circulation had risen to around 4,000-5,000. But soon thereafter, circulation shrunk. In August 1933, the now-weekly newspaper had around 1,200 subscribers. Around 800 of them lived in the Katowice area and 400 in Bielsko.
