= Motive (company) =

American technology company

Motive Technologies, Inc.
- Type: Private
- Industry: Freight; Logistics
- Founded: 2013
- Founder: Shoaib Makani, CEO; Obaid Khan; Joe Moran
- Area served: North America, Canada
- Key people: Shoaib Makani, CEO; Chirag Shah, CFO
- Number of employees: 3,500

Motive Technologies, Inc. (formerly KeepTruckin) is a technology company that creates software used by truck companies. Its main product is Hours of Service monitoring using GPS tracking and dashcams.

== History ==
=== Founding ===
In 2013, Shoaib Makani, along with co-founders Ryan Johns and Obaid Khan, founded KeepTruckin to improve the safety and efficiency of businesses. They began with an electronic logbook app for drivers to record their hours of service (HOS). Later, they expanded the platform to include vehicle and equipment tracking, driver safety, compliance, maintenance, and spend management.

=== 2022 rebrand ===
In 2022, KeepTruckin rebranded as Motive.

=== Present ===
In 2022, Motive claimed that it serves more than 120,000 businesses.

== Funding history ==
In 2013, the company raised seed capital in the amount of $2.3 million.

In 2015, the company received $8 million in Series A venture funding led by Index Ventures.

In 2017, the company raised $18 million in Series B venture funding led by Scale Venture Partners, Index Ventures and GV, the venture capital investment arm of Alphabet Inc.

In 2018, the company raised $50 million in Series C venture funding led by IVP, GV, Index Ventures, and Scale Venture Partners.

In 2019, the company received $149 million in Series D venture funding, mostly from Capital.

In 2021, the company secured $200 million in Series E venture funding, led by G2VP.

In 2022, the company raised $150 million in Series F venture funding co-led by Insight Partners and Kleiner Perkins. After funding, Motive reached a $2.85 billion valuation.

== See also ==
- Software as a service
- Fleet management software
- Hours of service
- Electronic logging device
- Trucking industry in the United States
