= Bund für Arbeiterbildung =

Bund für Arbeiterbildung was a German educational organization in interbellum Poland. It was the educational association of the German Socialist Labour Party in Poland (DSAP). The organization had around 6,000 members. The organization took part in publishing the monthly Der Oberschlesier as a joint organ together with Oberschlesischer Kulturverband and Verband der katholischen Vereine Oberschlesiens.
