= Tekion Corp =

Cloud technology company in California, US

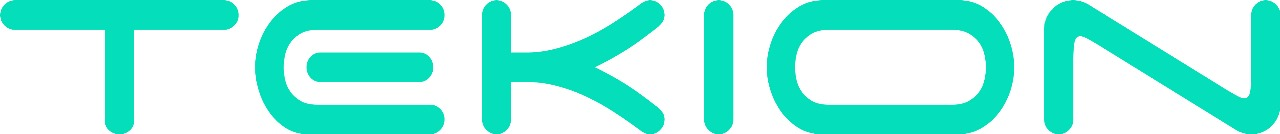
- Type: Private
- Industry: SaaS, Automotive Retail
- Founded: 2016
- Founder: Jay Vijayan; Guru Sankararaman
- Headquarters: Pleasanton, California, USA
- Area served: North America, Europe, India
- Key people: Jay Vijayan, CEO; Guru Sankararaman, COO
- Revenue: ▲US$100 million (2023)
- Number of employees: 3000+
- Website: tekion.com

Tekion Corp is a U.S.-based automotive retail technology company that uses artificial intelligence in its platform. The company is headquartered in Pleasanton, California, with its Asia-Pacific headquarters in Bengaluru, a regional center in Chennai, and operations in Canada and the United Kingdom. The company was founded by former Tesla, Inc. executive Jay Vijayan.

== History ==
Prior to founding Tekion, Jay served as the chief information officer (CIO) at Tesla Inc., where he reported directly to Elon Musk, Tesla's CEO. As CIO, Jay and his team managed Tesla's digital and information systems.

In 2016, he left Tesla to start Tekion, of which he serves as CEO. Initially bootstrapped, the company received funding from such investors as Index Ventures, Storm Ventures, Airbus Ventures, BMWi Ventures, Renault-Nissan-Mitsubishi Alliance Ventures, and General Motors.

In October 2020, the company became a unicorn after it raised US$150 million in a Series C financing round. This round was led by Advent International, Exor (holding company of Ferrari and the parent company of Stellantis, which owns Citroën, Fiat, Jeep, Maserati, Ram Trucks, Peugeot, Vauxhall), Airbus Ventures, FM Capital, and existing investors.

In October 2021, the company secured $250 million in its Series D funding round, with a valuation reaching $3.5 billion. This funding was led by Alkeon Capital, Durable Capital, and Hyundai Motor Company.

In July 2023, the company acquired vehicle registration technology company Five64.

The company's valuation was reported to exceed $4 billion following a $200 million investment from Dragoneer Investment Group, based in San Francisco, in July 2024. Since its founding, the company has raised a total of $640 million.

By 2026, Tekion's software platforms were deployed at more than 3,000 automotive dealership locations across North America and the United Kingdom.

== Products ==
In February 2020, the company launched its Automotive Retail Cloud (ARC) software, which helps connect automotive retail operations through a unified cloud platform. The platform later incorporated 52 automotive brands, including General Motors, Ford, Jeep, Honda, Hyundai, and Toyota. In 2022, the company added a CRM application to the ARC platform. In January 2024, Tekion entered into an agreement with Asbury Automotive Group, a publicly listed car dealership based in the US. In 2025, Ken Garff Automotive Group and Hartwell Automotive Group adopted Tekion's automotive retail platform across their dealership networks, with Hartwell deploying the platform across its 11 dealership locations in the United Kingdom. The company also developed a digital tool for Acura and a digital retail tool for electric vehicles for General Motors, which operate on the Automotive Enterprise Cloud (AEC) platform.

In 2024, Tekion announced a restructuring to transition its software platform from a cloud-based Software as a Service (SaaS) model to an artificial intelligence-focused architecture. As part of the transition, the company appointed Binu Mathew as chief technology officer.

== Awards and recognition ==
In 2025, Tekion was included in Fast Company's Best Workplaces for Innovators list. The same year, the company was included in Deloitte's Technology Fast 500, an annual ranking of North America's fastest-growing technology companies.
