= Simplified user interface =

A simplified user interface (SUI) is an illustration of a software interface that reduces irrelevant information to abstract shapes to create a "stylised but instantly recognisable image" that conveys the contextually important details.

Similar in look to wireframes, SUIs have uses in marketing, user onboarding (for instance by Slack and Google Analytics), and technical communication.

As well as improving the speed and clarity of communication, for those creating documentation SUIs offer a degree of future-proofing against incremental changes to the interface, and aid the translation of documents into other languages.
