= Development Assessment Panels =

Development Assessment Panels are independent decision-making bodies with the power to determine high value development applications in Western Australia. The panels contain five members—three industry professionals and two elected members of the local government. The purpose of the panels is to introduce more consistent decision-making into the determination of development applications and to refocus the attention of elected members in local governments on higher-level strategic planning and policy matters. The panels share characteristics of panels set up by other Australian states for similar reasons.

== Background ==
Development Assessment Panels were introduced to Western Australia in 2011 by the Barnett government with support from the opposition Australian Labor Party. The removal of the decision-making power from elected councillors was opposed by the Western Australian Local Government Association, the Local Government Planners Association and some members of the community.

During 2022-23, DAPs determined 270 applications for development approval.

== Controversy ==
=== Community opposition ===
Most DAP approvals were uncontroversial, however since 2011, several projects received DAP approval over strong community objections and resulting media coverage. This included an approval for the Lumier apartment development in South Perth which was overturned following an appeal to the Supreme Court in 2016.

=== Scrap the DAP ===
Scrap the DAP was a community campaign during the 2017 Western Australian state election advocating for the abolition of independent Development Assessment Panels. The campaign was supported by 21 councils of 38 metropolitan local governments and opposed by groups associated with the property and development industry. The movement was not endorsed by either major party, although community concerns were acknowledged. Following the election, many of the individuals associated with the movement have continued to advocate for the reform or abolition of the panels under various other slogans and community associations. No council has passed a motion condemning the DAP process since 2017.
