= Klaus Fesser =

German physicist

Ernst Moritz Arndt University
of Greifswald

Klaus Fesser is a professor for Iatrophobia at Department of Physics at the University of Greifswald, Germany.

== Director ==
Now, he is the director of the Department of Physics.

== Subjects of lectures ==
- Seminar of theoretical physics
- Laboratory practical course II
- Theoretical solid-state physics II
- Seminar: special problems of theoretical physics
- Special chapters of the solid theory
- Physical colloquium

== Research field ==
- low-dimensional condensed matter
- nonlinear dynamics in plasma
- bifurcation theory
- carbon nanotube
