= Toonimo =

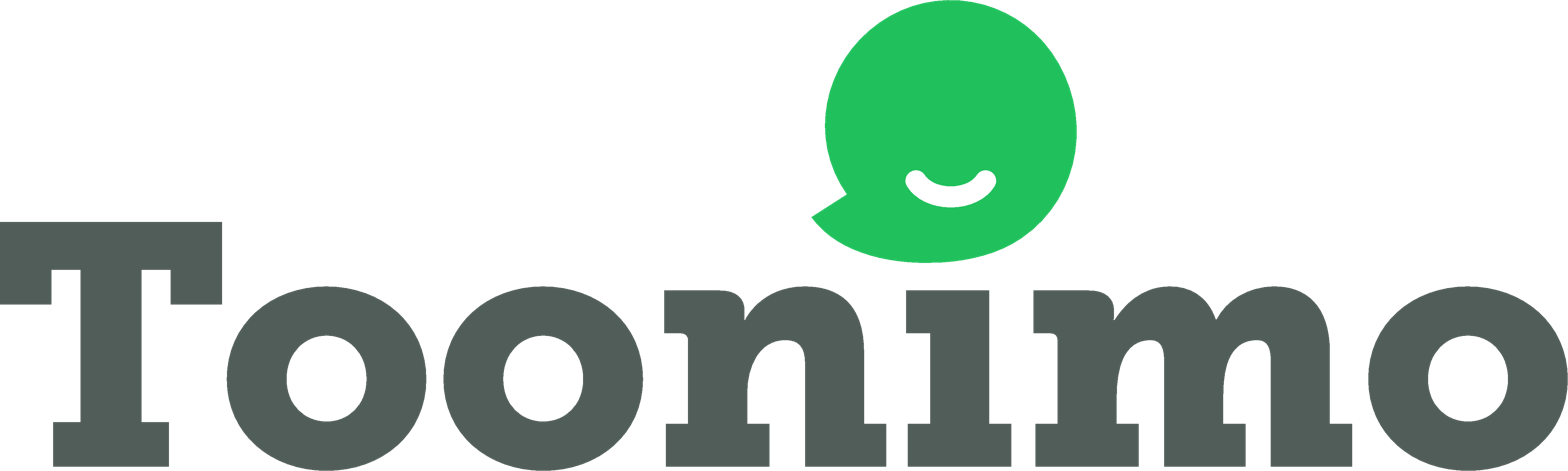

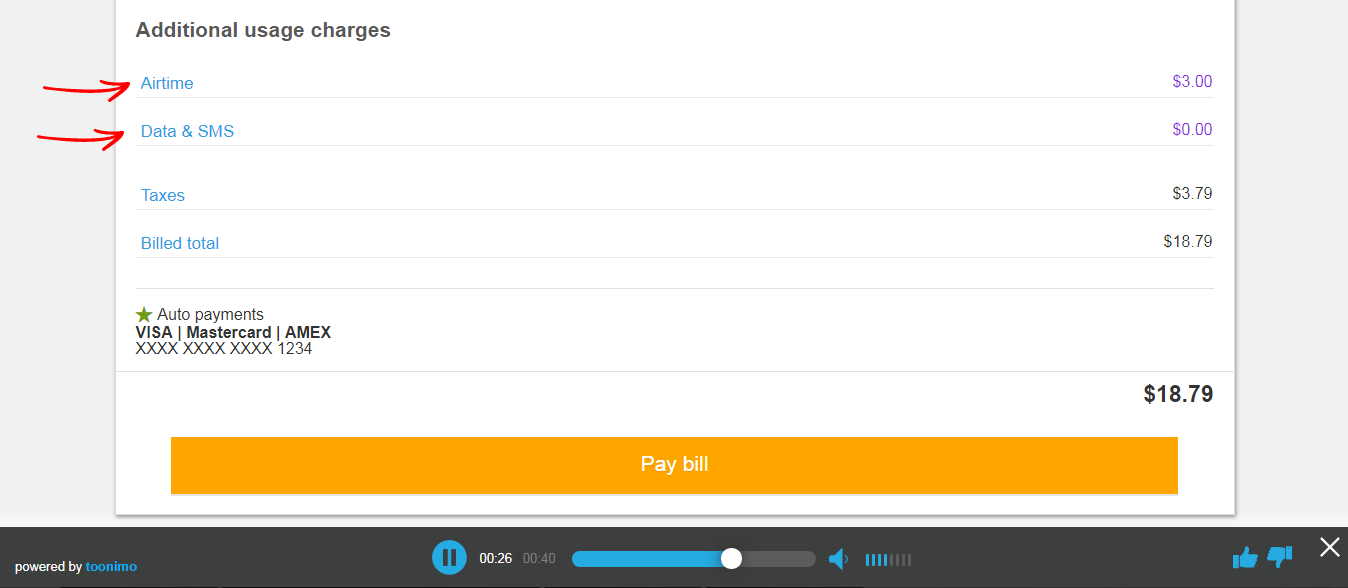
- Screenshot Walkthrough on bill pay web page
- Available in: English, Multi-Language
- Headquarters: New York, NY
- Founders: Dan Kotlicki (CEO); Ohad Rozen
- Industry: Software
- Website: www.toonimo.com
- Launched: 2013; 13 years ago

Toonimo is an American software company that produces a web-based online digital walkthrough platform. The platform guides a users through website funnels.

Toonimo works by overlaying human voice audio and graphical coachmarks on web pages to guide or orient web users. Other features include an analytics dashboard, A/B testing functionality, a personalization suite, and more. The company serves financial, insurance, healthcare, telecommunication, education, travel, hospitality, and other industries in both B2B and B2B2C situations.

== History ==
Toonimo was founded in 2013 by Ohad Rozen and Dan Kotlicki, who is also the CEO of the company.

They established their headquarters in New York City, NY, and opened an additional office located in Tel Aviv, Israel. Their assistance was first used by small and midsize insurance companies and banks, who did not have enough staff to help customers.

In 2017, Toonimo joined the Oracle Startup Cloud Accelerator program and got access to its worldwide network of bank, telecom and insurance companies.

Toonimo was backed by Lightspeed Venture Partners, Real Life Innovations, and several other private investors.
