= German Socialist Labour Party in Poland – Left =

Left-wing political party in 1930s Poland

German Socialist Labour Party in Poland – Left Deutsche Sozialistische Arbeitspartei in Polen – Linke
- Leader: Heinrich Scheibler
- Founded: October 3, 1931
- Ideology: Socialism

The German Socialist Labour Party in Poland – Left (German: Deutsche Sozialistische Arbeitspartei in Polen – Linke, DSAP–Linke; Polish: Niemiecka Socjalistyczna Partia Robotnicza w Polsce – Lewica) was a political party in the Second Polish Republic. The party was founded on October 3, 1930, as a leftist split from the German Socialist Labour Party of Poland (DSAP) in Łódź.

Most of the members of the North Łódź party branch of DSAP (German: Ortsgruppe Lodz-Nord) joined DSAP–Linke in the split. DSAP-Linke took over the DSAP party office on Urzędnicza street 13. The DSAP–Linke also attracted some recruits from Ortsgruppe Lodz-Chojny of the erstwhile DSAP. Some other DSAP–Linke members were recruited amongst German and Jewish workers in Stryków, Brzeziny and Tomaszów. However, the total membership of DSAP–Linke didn't exceed 200.

DSAP–Linke was led by Heinrich Scheibler, who had been the chairman of the Lodz-Nord party branch of DSAP and who in 1930 had become member of the DSAP Party Council. Schlieber had advocated that DSAP should seek cooperation with other leftwing parties, for unity between socialists and communists in struggle against reaction. Other founding members of DSAP–Linke were Johann Rückert, Oskar Fiebig, Adolf Jedich, and Joseph Dillner.

After the split, the relations between DSAP–Linke and the mother-party DSAP (or DSAP–Rechts, i.e. 'DSAP–Right', as DSAP–Linke branded the party) were antagonistic. DSAP–Linke characterized DSAP and the Polish Socialist Party (PPS) as 'social fascists', arguing that the leaderships of those two parties were laying the foundations for fascism in Poland. The DSAP press organs, on their behalf, began using the spelling 'Szajbel' for Scheibler's name, thus insinuating that he was Jewish (Scheibler had married a Jewish woman).

The peak of activity of DSAP–Linke coincided with the 1930 October–November campaign ahead of the parliamentary election. DSAP–Linke contested the election in coalition with the Polish Socialist Party – Left, running on joint lists titled PPS–Lewica (List 23). The bloc propagated the formation of a Workers-Peasants government and self-rule for national minorities, political stands that attracted sharp attacks from the Sanacja government and the Centrolew opposition coalition (in which the DSAP participated). The Polish government classified the DSAP–Linke as 'crypto-communist'. The list on which Scheibler was the number 2 candidate was declared invalid by the Polish government.

On January 5, 1931, DSAP–Linke organized an assembly in Łódź. The political police, assisted by uniformed policemen, arrested all participants and party materials were seized. 46 participants were accused of anti-state activities. In October 1931, a legal case against twenty-two party cadres accused of connections with the Soviet Union, was opened. Scheibler was threatened with two years imprisonment, but on March 23, 1932, he was found 'not guilty'.

After a short existence, DSAP–Linke became defunct. Already after the 1930 election, the view inside the party was that the party was lacking prospects for the future. Sometime around 1932 Scheibler joined the Communist Party of Poland (KPP). Most members of the political activist core of DSAP–Linke also joined KPP. Some former DSAP–Linke members rejoined DSAP.
