= DAP Helicópteros =

Chilean helicopter airline

IATA	ICAO	Call sign
-	DHE	HELIDAP
- Founded: 1989
- Hubs: Carlos Ibáñez Del Campo International Airport
- Secondary hubs: Antofagasta, Copiapo, Santiago, Posesion, Antarctica, Rio Gallegos
- Fleet size: 16
- Destinations: All Chilean territory south of Argentina; Antarctica
- Parent company: Aerovías DAP
- Headquarters: Punta Arenas, Chile
- Website: http://www.daphelicopteros.cl/

DAP Helicópteros is a helicopter operator based in Punta Arenas, Chile. It operates scheduled and charter services in the southern Patagonia area, and also operates flights on behalf of the state-owned oil company, ENAP. Its main base is Presidente Carlos Ibáñez del Campo International Airport, Punta Arenas. The ambulance fleet covers most of the country.

== History ==
The airline is the helicopter division of Aerovías DAP, which was established in 1979 and is wholly owned by the Pivcevic family. "DAP" is the acronym of its creator, Domingo Andrés Pivcevic, a Punta Arenas businessman.

DAP Helicopteros has a clear record of 95,000 flown hours without mayor accidents, having provided 8,390 consecutive days with 24-hour service in OffShore and EMS. DAP has a high safety standard and has been audited to BARS standards for mining services. This was the first rotor wing company in Chile to present SMS (safety management system) program to the local DGAC. This company is known for having the best safety records in Chile and has been recognized as an AS355F "Reference fleet" by Eurocopter.

== Fleet ==
DAP Helicópteros' fleet comprises:

- 4 Eurocopter AS355F Twinstar for off-shore petrol ops
- 5 MBB Bo 105CB-4 for Emergency medical services operations; three based at Santiago-Lo Aguirre helipad and one based at Punta Arenas and one in Antarctica
- 4 Eurocopter BO105CBS EMS equipes and certify as air ambulance; the first in Chile
- 1 Eurocopter EC-135 (to be operated by DAP Helicópteros Argentina SA)
- 1 Eurocopter AS350B3 for mining services in the north of Chile

The recent agreement between DAP and Chile's oil Company (ENAP, Empresa Nacional del Petróleo) implied the renovation of the helicopters currently in use.
