= Franciszek Fesser =

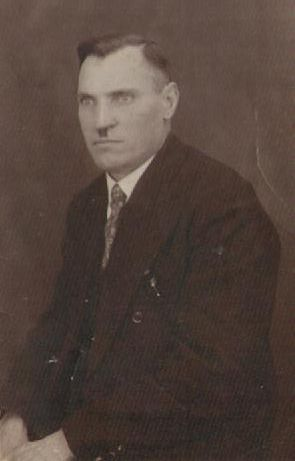
Franciszek Fesser

Franciszek Fesser (born 16 August 1885 in Rogi, died 23 October 1956 in Piotrowice (Katowice), was a Polish politician, He was deputy of the Silesian Parliament from 1930 to 1939.

== Biography ==
During his youth Fesser worked as a miner in the "Cleopas" mine. In 1918 he joined the Polish Military Organisation in his home district of Opole, where he took part in the 1921 plebiscite in Upper Silesia and the Silesian Uprisings against German rule. When the eastern part of Silesia came under Polish control in 1922, he continued to participate in national-patriotic organisations, including the Association of Silesian Insurgents and the Union for the Defence of the Western Borderlands. Fesser was active in the trade union movement, and helped to organise the Trade Union of the Mining Industry under the Union of Trade Unions. In 1926, he became involved in the National Christian Labour Union, and was elected as a deputy to the third Silesian Parliament in 1930. During this first term, he was a member of the Commission of Labour and Social Welfare, and in 1935 he was re-elected to the fourth Silesian Parliament. During this time, he was Vice-Chairman of the Commission of Labour and Social Welfare, and also worked in the Local Authority, Regulations and Budget and Taxes Commissions. In the 1930s Fesser was also a deputy chief of the Piotrowice municipality, and was the last deputy chief until the beginning of World War II.

During the German occupation of Poland, Fesser lived in central Poland. After the war ended in 1945, Fesser returned to Silesia, however did not return to political life due to illness. Fesser died in Katowice-Piotrowice in October 1956.
