= German Labour Party of Poland =

Defunct political party in Poland

The German Labour Party of Poland (German: Deutsche Arbeiterpartei Polens, abbreviated DAP) was a German social democratic party in Poland.

== Party ==
DAP was founded in Łódź on 19 January 1922 at the office of the Association of German-speaking Master Craftsmen and Workers (Verein deutschsprechender Meister und Arbeiter). The party gathered former members of SDKPiL in Łódź and Central Poland. The founders of DAP, Emil Zerbe and Artur Kronig, had refused to join the rest of the SDKPiL in forming the Communist Workers Party of Poland. DAP was the first German socialist party in independent Poland. DAP won three seats in the Sejm in the 1922 Polish legislative election. Zerbe was elected on the state-wide list. Kronig was elected from the Łódź City constituency. August Utta, leader of the rightist trend inside DAP, was elected from the Łódź County constituency with the support of Jewish voters. The main press organ of DAP was the weekly Arbeit (“Labour”) published 1920–1923) and from 1924 onwards the daily Lodzer Volkszeitung (“Łódź People's Newspaper”).

DAP fielded its own list for the 1923 Łódź City Council election, albeit whilst maintaining alliance with the Polish Socialist Party (PPS) and the General Jewish Labour Bund in Poland. The DAP list obtained 11,421 votes and won five seats in the City Council, far more than the German bourgeois nationalist BDP (which obtained 5,581 votes and 2 seats). The collaboration with PPS and Bund led to the departure of the Utta-led faction. Utta joined the German nationalist-conservative camp.

On 9 August 1925 DAP merged with the German Social Democratic Party (DSPP), forming the German Socialist Labour Party in Poland (DSAP). The merger was however only nominal, in reality DSPP and DAP continued to exist as separate parties until October 1929. On 6–7 October 1929 DSAP became a consolidated united political party.
