= German Social Democratic Party (Poland) =

German Social Democratic Party Deutsche Sozialdemokratische Partei
- Leader: Johann Kowoll
- Founded: March 22, 1922
- Newspaper: Kattowitzer Volkswille
- Ideology: Social democracy German minority interests

German Social Democratic Party (German: Deutsche Sozialdemokratische Partei, DSDP) was a political party in Poland, founded on March 26, 1922.

== Foundation ==
The party emerged from a fusion of the Oberschlesien (Upper Silesia) organizations of the Social Democratic Party of Germany (SPD) and the Independent Social Democratic Party of Germany (USPD) and the Teschener-Schlesien organization of the Social Democratic Workers Party of Austria (SDAPÖ). These were German and Austrian Social Democratic party branches in areas transferred to Poland after the Silesian Uprisings. The founding meeting took place in Bielsko. Johann Kowoll was appointed chairman of the DSDP. The party, although geographically limited to Upper Silesia, intended to organize German workers throughout the Polish republic.

The newspaper Kattowitzer Volkswille ('Kattowitz (Katowice) People's Will'), the erstwhile organ of the SPD in Upper Silesia, became the organ of DSDP.

== 1922 elections ==
On August 21, 1922, DSPP formed an electoral bloc together with the Independent Socialist Labour Party (NSPP). In the September 24, 1922, election to the Silesian Sejm the bloc contested under the name Deutsche Sozialdemokratische Partei. The candidature won two out of 48 seats, to be held by Johann Kowoll and Karl Buchwald. Ahead of the November 5, 1922, Polish Sejm election, the electoral bloc fell apart. The NSPP leader, Bolesław Drobner, decided to withdraw their candidate lists and break the agreement with DSPP in protest of Kowoll and Buchwald joining the 'German Club' in the Silesian Sejm.

== Mergers ==
The DSPP held its second party congress December 7–8, 1924.

On August 9, 1925, DSPP merged with the Łódź-based German Labour Party of Poland (DAP), forming the German Socialist Labour Party in Poland (DSAP). The merger was however only nominal, in reality DSPP and DAP continued to exist as separate parties until October 1929. On October 6–7, 1929, DSAP became a unitary political party.
