= Root, Inc. =

American insurance company

Root Company
- Type: Public
- Traded as: Nasdaq: ROOT
- Industry: Insurance
- Founded: March 2015
- Founders: Alex Timm; Dan Manges
- Headquarters: Columbus, Ohio, United States
- Area served: 36 States (Alabama, Arizona, Arkansas, California, Colorado, Connecticut, Delaware, Florida, Georgia, Illinois, Indiana, Iowa, Kansas, Kentucky, Louisiana, Maryland, Minnesota, Mississippi, Missouri, Montana, Nebraska, Nevada, New Mexico, North Dakota, Ohio, Oklahoma, Oregon, Pennsylvania, South Carolina, Tennessee, Texas, Utah, Virginia, Washington, West Virginia, and Wisconsin)
- Key people: Alex Timm (CEO); Matt Bonakdarpour (CTO); Megan Binkley (CFO); Jon Allison (Chief Administrative Officer); Jason Shapiro (Senior VP of Business Development)
- Products: Car insurance, renters insurance, homeowners insurance
- Revenue: ▲$455 million(2024)
- Net income: ▲ -$147.4 million(2024)
- Number of employees: 700 (2024)
- Website: www.joinroot.com

Root Insurance Company is an online car insurance company operating in the United States.

== About ==
Root Insurance headquarters are in Columbus, Ohio. Root is focused on embedded insurance and expanding their embedded insurance offerings acquiring customers through strategic partnerships. Root Insurance largest markets are Texas, Georgia, and Colorado, where approximately 35% of customers for the year ended December 31, 2022 reside. As of December 31, 2023, Root has 341,764 policies in force and $678.7 million in cash and cash equivalents.

== History ==
Root Insurance was founded in March 2015 by Alex Timm and Dan Manges.

In 2021, Manges co-founder retired as CTO but remained a consultant to the company through December 2021. In August 2021, Root announced a partnership deal with Carvana to develop personalized auto insurance for Carvana's car-buying platform. This was Root Insurance's first embedded partner.

The deal, initially formed around a $126 million investment by Carvana for a 5% stake in Root, includes warrants that can be exercised at certain stages or tranches. The collaboration uses both companies technologies to develop an embedded experience for customers purchasing a car with Carvana.

In January 2022, Root closed on a $300 million five-year term loan with BlackRock. The maturity of this term loan is January 27, 2027. On March 23, 2023, Root Insurance Chief Revenue and Operating Officer, Daniel Rosenthal resigned, having started as a director for Root Insurance in 2017.

== Sponsorships ==
In December 2020, 23XI Racing announced that Root will be one of the sponsors of the No. 23 Toyota Camry driven by Bubba Wallace. As of January 2023, Root is no longer sponsoring 23XI Racing or Bubba Wallace. In 2023, Root sponsored Dreyer & Reinbold Racing and Ryan Hunter-Reay in the 2023 Indianapolis 500. For 2024, Root signed a multi-race sponsorship deal with Chip Ganassi Racing to sponsor both Álex Palou and Marcus Armstrong in the IndyCar Series.
