= Herman Diamand =

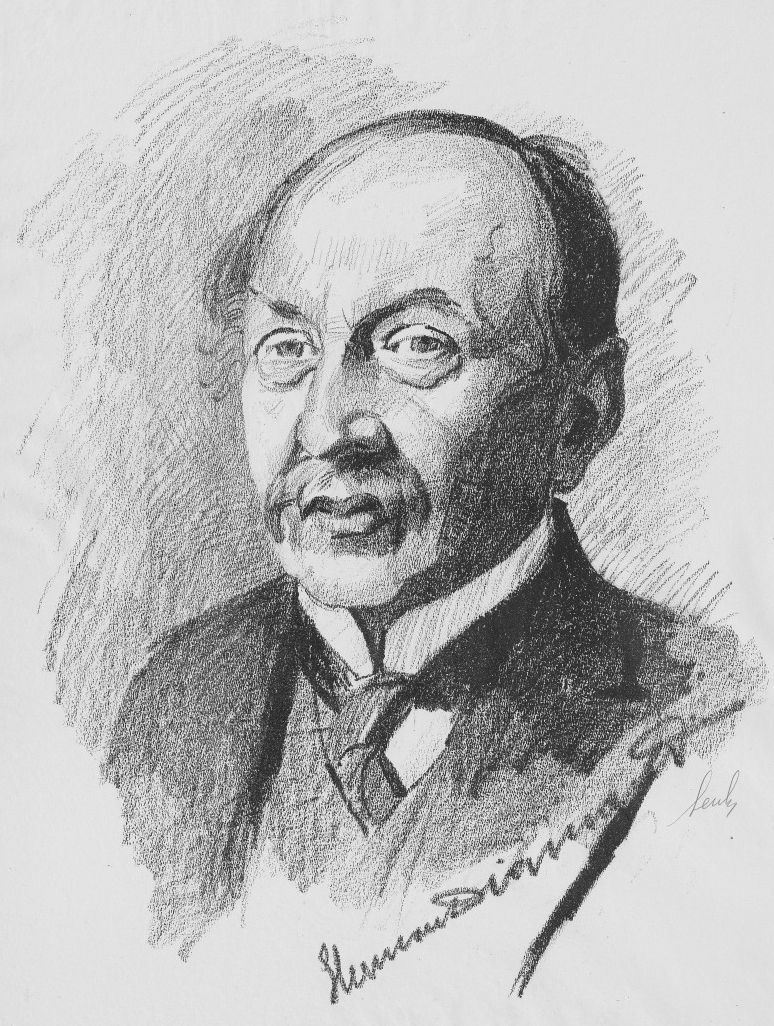

Member of Parliament for the Second Sejm (1928-1930)
- In office 4 March 1928 – 30 August 1930
- President: Ignacy Mościcki

Personal details
- Born: 30 March 1860 Lemberg, Austrian Empire
- Died: 26 February 1931 (aged 70) Lwów, Poland (today Lviv, Ukraine)
- Party: Polish Socialist Party

Herman Diamand (30 March 1860 – 26 February 1931) was a Polish lawyer and socialist politician of Jewish origin, cofounder of Workers' Party of Galicia. Member of the Austrian parliament then member of the Polish Parliament till his death.

== Biography ==
Born in Lviv to a middle-class Jewish family, the son of Jakub and Betty (née Holländer), Herman Diamand attended a modern Jewish primary school. He studied law and political science at the University of Vienna, Lviv and Chernivtsi where in 1896 he obtained a doctorate.

Already during his studies, by the late 1880s, he had become a convinced socialist, rejected Zionism, and advocated the Polish nationalist cause as a co-founder of the Polish Social Democratic Party of Galicia (PPSD) (October–November 1890). He was a member of the party's executive committee from 1897 to 1899 and from 1904 to 1909 was a member of its directorate. In 1909 he represented the Polish Socialists at the International Bureau of the Second International. Diamand devoted enormous organizational and intellectual energy to Jewish matters. Although an assimilationist, he acknowledged the need to address issues that were particularly relevant to Jewish workers. He published and edited several Yiddish newspapers with the PPSD imprint, including the biweekly Di yidishe folksblat (Lwów, 1896–1897), the weekly Di yidishe folkstsaytung (Lwów, 1903–1904), and the short-lived Di yidishe folksshtime (Lwów, 1907). He was a Galician representative in the Austrian parliament from 1917 to 1918.

During World War I, Diamand supported Józef Piłsudski and his Polish Legions, writing Yiddish appeals to Jews of the region to support the struggle for Polish independence. In independent Poland, Diamand served on the executive committee of the Polish Socialist Party and was a member of the Polish parliament from 1919 until his death.

In December 1918 was appointed to the Polish Liquidation Committee, where he headed the department of mining. Strove French and English socialists to support the efforts regarding the Polish Silesia. He participated in the Polish delegation on trade negotiations with Germany (from 1924 to 1928) and the Geneva Naval Conference (1927). He was an active member of the Polish Socialist Party, being part of the leadership as a member of the Central Executive Committee (from 1919 to 1926) and member, Vice-President and Chairman of the Supreme Council (from 1919 to 1930). He was considered an expert in parliamentary practice and economic and financial matters. He has published articles in Polish and foreign socialist press, including Naprzod, "Rights of the People" Worker, "Arbeiterzeitung" and "Jüdische Volkstime".

Diamand was an articulate and energetic voice in defense of the civil rights of Jews as individuals. He remained committed to assimilationism and spoke out against the demands of Jewish national parties. His memoir, Pamiętnik Hermana Diamanda (Memoirs of Herman Diamand; 1932), appeared shortly after his death, as did a collection of his speeches in the Sejm (Przemówienia w Sejmie Rzeczypospolitej [Speeches in the Republican Sejm]; 1933).

He died of a heart attack on February 26, 1931, and was buried at the Jewish cemetery in Lviv.
