= Feser =

Feser is a surname. Notable people with the surname include:

- Edward Feser (born 1968), American philosopher, writer, and academic
- Jan Feser (born 1985), German politician
- Justin Feser (born 1992), Canadian ice hockey player
- Tara Feser (born 1980), Canadian wheelchair basketball player

== See also ==
- Fesser
