= Johann Kowoll =

German politician (1890–1941)

Johann Kowoll (December 27, 1890 in Laurahütte – 1941) was a German socialist politician.

In his young years, Kowoll had several jobs; as stenographer, office assistant, journalist, cottage worker and machine operator. In 1906 he joined the Free Trade Unions. In 1908 he became a member of the Social Democratic Party of Germany.

During the German Revolution, he served as the foreman of the Workers and Soldiers Council of Laurahütte and was a member of the Central Workers and Soldiers Council in Silesia. He was also the District Secretary of the Free Trade Unions in Upper Silesia. In 1919 Kowoll became the editor of Kattowitzer Volkswille.

In 1922 he was elected to the Silesian Sejm.
