= Sui Yuan =

Chinese actress

- 隋源
- Born: Drolma Suijun; May 8, 1992 (age 34); Haikou, Hainan, China
- Education: Beijing Film Academy
- Occupations: Actress, Dancer
- Years active: 2016–present
- Height: 165 cm (5 ft 5 in)
- Spouse: Unknown
- Children: 1

Sui Yuan (Chinese: 隋源; pinyin: Suí Yuán; born 8 May 1992) is a Chinese actress and dancer of Tibetan ethnicity.

== Early life and education ==
Sui was born in the city of Haikou in Hainan on 1992. Her father was from Shandong, while her mother, a dancer of Tibetan ethnicity, was from Qinghai. Due to the influence of her mother, Sui dreamed of becoming a dancer and as a result began dancing since childhood.

In 1998, at the age of 6, she attended the Hainan National Science Park Experimental School for primary school and was selected in the school dance team. Due to her dancing skills, she was admitted to the Dance Department of the People's Liberation Army Academy of Art when she was in the fifth grade of primary school. After graduation, she was assigned to the Art Troupe of the Nanjing Military Region, where she served for six years.

In 2015, Sui applied for admission at Beijing Film Academy, but was unable to pass the entrance examination. Later, she entered Hainan Huaqiao Middle School to attend the culture class and prepare for the college entrance examination. In the end, she was admitted as a student at the Beijing Film Academy, after scoring 622 in the entrance exam.

== Career ==
In July 2017, she starred in China's first medical drama film Doctor's Mind, where she played the role of nurse Jin Shanshan. In order to prepare for the role, she went to the emergency department of a hospital in Beijing to experience real life hospital operations. For her performance in the movie, she received the Golden Angel Award for Best Newcomer at the 13th Chinese American Film Festival in November 2017.

Her next film role was in the 2017 film Youth, where she played the role of Zhuoma, a member of the People's Liberation Army Art Troupe. She was selected for the role in 2016, when the filmmakers of the film arrived at the Beijing Dance Academy for auditions. Due to her dance skills, she was selected by director Feng Xiaogang. This was her first big screen role.

In 2021, Sui starred alongside Wang Luodan, Gina Jin and Lan Yingying in the TV drama Crossroad Bistro, which was also directed by Feng Xiaogang.

== Personal life ==
Sui is married and on November 5, 2022, she gave birth to her son.

== Filmography ==
=== Films ===
Year	Title	Role	Notes
2017	Doctor's Mind	Jin Shanshan	
2017	Youth	Zhuoma	
2017	I Dedicate My Youth To You	Herself	Documentary on the making of the film Youth
2022	New Five Golden Flowers	Meng Xiaolin	

=== Television ===
Year	Title	Role	Notes
2021	Monarch Industry	Xiao Yuxiu	
2021	Crossroad Bistro	Feng Xi	
TBA	Secret War	Song Yuqing	
