= Death-associated protein 1 =

Protein found in humans

DAP

Identifiers
- Aliases: DAP, death associated protein
- External IDs: OMIM: 600954; MGI: 1918190; GeneCards: DAP

Gene location (Human)
| Chr. | Chromosome 5 (human) |
| Band | 5p15.2 | Start | 10,679,230 bp |
| Band | 5p15.2 | End | 10,761,234 bp |

Gene location (Mouse)
| Chr. | Chromosome 15 (mouse) |
| Band | 15|15 B2 | Start | 31,224,460 bp |
| Band | 15|15 B2 | End | 31,274,487 bp |
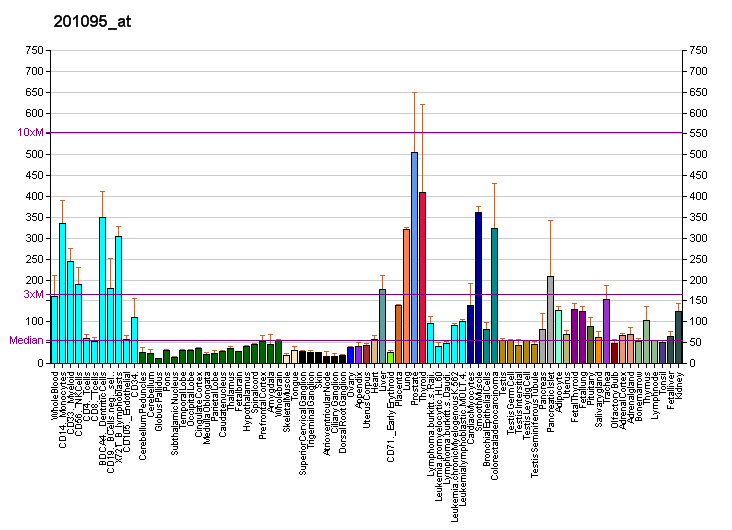
RNA expression pattern
| Bgee | Human / Mouse (ortholog); Top expressed in: body of pancreas; stromal cell of endometrium; islet of Langerhans; gallbladder; right coronary artery; thoracic aorta; ascending aorta; left adrenal gland; right adrenal cortex; left adrenal cortex / Top expressed in: transitional epithelium of urinary bladder; calvaria; gastrula; blood; pyloric antrum; pancreas; islet of Langerhans; left lobe of liver; ankle; body of femur; More reference expression data |
| BioGPS | More reference expression data |
Orthologs
| Databases | NCBI: entry; OMA: entry |
| Species | Human | Mouse |
| Entrez | 1611 | 223453 |
| Ensembl | ENSG00000112977 | ENSMUSG00000039168 |
| UniProt | P51397 | Q91XC8 |
| RefSeq (mRNA) | NM_004394; NM_001291963 | NM_146057 |
| RefSeq (protein) | NP_001278892; NP_004385 | NP_666169 |
| Location (UCSC) | Chr 5: 10.68 – 10.76 Mb | Chr 15: 31.22 – 31.27 Mb |
| PubMed search |
- Wikidata
| View/Edit Human | View/Edit Mouse |

Death-associated protein 1 is a protein that in humans is encoded by the DAP gene.

DAP gene encodes a basic, proline-rich, 15-kD protein. Death-associated protein acts as a positive mediator of programmed cell death that is induced by interferon-gamma.

== See also ==
- DAP3
