= Sui (surname) =

Sui is the transcription of two Chinese surnames, Suí (隋) and Suī (眭).

== Notable people ==
=== Suī (眭) ===
- Sui Gu (眭固), a member of the Heishan bandits in the Eastern Han dynasty
- Sui Lu (眭禄; born 1992), Chinese artistic gymnast
- Sui Ran (睢冉; born 1992), Chinese basketball player

=== Suí (隋) ===
- Sui Dongliang (隋东亮; born 1977), Chinese football midfielder
- Sui Donglu (隋东陆; born 1982), Chinese football defender
- Sui Feifei (隋菲菲; born 1979), Chinese basketball player
- Sui Jianguo (隋建國; born 1956), Chinese contemporary artist
- Sui Jianshuang (隋剑爽; born 1989), Chinese rhythmic gymnast
- Mike Sui (隋凱; fl. 2000s), American comedian
- Sui Shengsheng (born 1980), Chinese volleyball player
- Sonia Sui (隋棠; born 1980), Taiwanese actress, television host and model
- Sui Xinmei (隋新梅; born 1965), Chinese shot putter
- Sui Wenjing (隋文静; born 1995), Chinese pair skater
- Sui Weijie (隋维杰; born 1983), Chinese football goalkeeper
- Sui Yuan (隋源; born 1992), Chinese actress
- Sui Yunjiang (隋云江; born 1945), Chinese martial arts master
