= Karol Grzesik =

Polish politician (1890-1940)

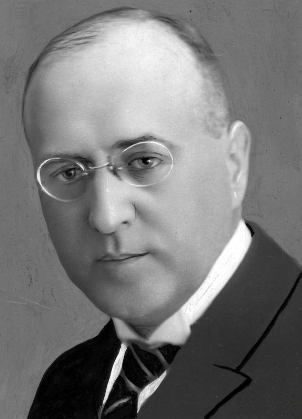
- Born: 30 May 1890; Prussia, Siedliska
- Died: May 1940 (aged 49–50); Soviet Union, Kiev
- Citizenship: Second Polish Republic
- Education: University of Wrocław, Jagiellonian University
- Occupations: Politician, Military personnel
- Political party: Nonpartisan Bloc for Cooperation with the Government, Camp of National Unity
- Awards: Virtuti Militari, Order of Polonia Restituta, Cross of Independence, Cross of Valour (Poland), Iron Cross, Order of St. Sava

Karol Grzesik, alias « Hauke » (30 May 1890 — May 1940) was a Polish politician who worked in Upper Silesia. He was a deputy of the Sejm of Poland of the II and III convocations, Marshal of the Sejm of Silesia of the IV convocation (1935–1939), as well as President of Chorzów. Captain of the artillery reserve of the Polish Army, is one of the victims of the Katyn massacre.

== Biography ==
During World War I, as a second lieutenant, he served in the 54th Field Artillery Regiment of the Army of the German Empire. In Poland, he joined the Polish Youth Union Zet and joined the Polish Military Organisation in January 1919. After the creation of the General Command of the Army of Upper Silesia in July 1919, he became chief of the artillery department, then instructor of the IV Gliwice district and commandant of the III district, which includes the cities of Prudnik, Ratsibuz and Kozle.

After Poland gained independence in 1918, this Polish soldier joined the Polish army. He took part in two Silesian uprisings:

- In the first uprising, which took place from September to October 1919, he was imprisoned in Katowice and Raciborze;
- In the second uprising, as commandant of the second hundred in Gliwice, he held the rank of captain.

In December 1920, he became adjutant and representative of Poland at the General Directorate of the Plebiscite Police (Abstimmungspolizei Oberschlesien) in Opole. From April to June 1921, he served as Chief Inspector of the Plebiscite Defense Command and commanded the Vostok task Force during the III Silesian Uprising. On 2 June 1921, he declared himself commander-in-chief of the uprising, for which he was arrested on the orders of Wojciech Korfanty and put on trial. However, despite this, his case was dismissed. He was an active participant in the Union of Former Rebels and the Union of Silesian Rebels, and from 1923 to 1925, he served as president of the latter organization. For his services, he was promoted to the rank of artillery captain with seniority as of 1 June 1919. In 1923 and 1924, he served as a reserve officer in the 6th Field Artillery Regiment in Krakow. In 1934, already as a captain of the reserve, he was appointed an officer of district No. V. He remained in this post until his 40th year of life, and at that time his name was included in the lists of the district command of the additions of the Royal Metallurgical Plant.

Karol became an organizer of the General Federation of Labor in 1930 and headed its department in Upper Silesia. Since 1937, he has held leading positions in the United Trade Unions of Poland, and since 1938, he has been one of the two vice-presidents of the Union of Polish Trade Unions. In 1936, he became one of the founders of the Society for the Promotion of Higher Research in the Field of Socio-Economic Sciences.

Before the outbreak of World War II, he was included in the so-called « special book of persecution » (Sonderfahndungsbuch Polen), created by the Germans. He was forced to move first to Lublin and then to Kiev. After the Soviet Union attacked Poland on 17 September 1939, he was arrested in the eastern territories of the Second Polish-Lithuanian Commonwealth. In 1940, he was killed by the NKVD. His name was included in the so-called Ukrainian Katyn list, which was published in 1994. It was listed at number 661 in the 56-3/76 export list.
