= Sui, Rajasthan =

Sui Suin, Sihaggoti
- village
- Nickname: Siyagooti
- Location in Rajasthan, India Sui (India)
- Coordinates: 28°43′N 74°07′E
- Country: India
- State: Rajasthan
- District: Bikaner
- Founder: Chokha Ram Siyag

Government
  - Body: Sarpanch Pramod singh rathor

Languages
  - Official: Hindi
- Time zone: UTC+5:30 (IST)
- Postal code: 334603
- ISO 3166 code: RJ-IN
- Vehicle registration: RJ-
- Nearest city: Bikaner
- Sex ratio: 997/1000 ♂/♀

Sui is a village in Lunkaransar tehsil in Bikaner district in Rajasthan, India. Its nearby village is Shekhsar.
