= Electronic performance support systems =

An electronic performance support system (EPSS) is any computer software program or component that improves user performance.

EPSSs can help an organization to reduce the cost of training staff while increasing productivity and performance. They can empower employees to perform tasks with a minimum amount of external intervention or training. By using this type of system an employee, especially a new employee, will often not only be able to complete his or her work more quickly and accurately, but, as a secondary benefit, will also learn more about the job and the employer's business.

An EPSS is best considered when

- workers require knowledge to achieve individual performance in a business environment
- skilled performers are spending a lot of time helping less skilled performers
- new workers must begin to perform immediately and training is impractical, unavailable or constrained
- employees need to be guided through a complex process or task that cannot be memorized.

These situations often occur when new systems (e.g. customer relationship management, enterprise resource planning) are introduced, upgraded or consolidated, and in certain call centres when agents must perform using complex systems, processes or products.

== Components ==
There are different views about the components and characteristics of EPSS. For example, from Barker and Banerji’s (1995) point of view, an EPSS has four functional levels, which should be brought together:

1. the user interface shell (the human computer interface) and the database
2. generic tools (help system, documentation, text retrieval system, intelligent agents, tutoring facility, simulation tools and communication resources)
3. application-specific support tools
4. a target application domain (schools, particular business settings, military, etc.).

== Advantages ==
1. Reducing the complexity or number of steps required to perform a task
2. Providing the performance information an employee needs to perform a task
3. Providing a decision support system that enables an employee to identify the action that is appropriate for a particular set of conditions

== Definitions ==
In Electronic Performance Support Systems, Gloria Gery defined EPSS as:

an integrated electronic environment that is available to and easily
accessible by each employee and is structured to provide immediate, individualized
on-line access to the full range of information, software, guidance, advice and
assistance, data, images, tools, and assessment and monitoring systems to permit
job performance with minimal support and intervention by others.

Also, in 1991, Barry Raybould gave a shorter definition:

a computer-based system that improves worker productivity by providing on-the-job access to integrated information, advice, and learning experiences.

From a business perspective, a former Nortel Networks executive, William Bezanson (2002) provided a definition linked to application usability and organizational results:

A performance support system provides just-in-time, just enough training, information, tools, and help for users of a product or work environment, to enable optimum performance by those users when and where needed, thereby also enhancing the performance of the overall business.

== EPSS versus online help ==
An EPSS must be distinguished from a traditional online help system. Online help usually supports a single software application and is not necessarily focused on the entire range of job tasks (which may involve multiple applications), but just that specific software. With online help, cross-referencing is often not available and the information provided is limited and rarely combined with procedures or complex tasks. Perhaps most critically, on-line help cannot be customized to the user or the job task; in fact, the same software screen may require different inputs depending on the user and job task. Online help is also not contextual to the user's current situation and requires users to search through for the solution to their problem.

== EPSS versus e-learning simulations ==
EPSS must also be differentiated from e-learning simulations that replay a series of steps on-demand within a software application. Simulations are more closely associated with on-demand training, not just-in-time support, because of the longer time considerations, complexity, and media restrictions for playing a simulation. An EPSS can be considered a part of the e-learning category, as it is on-demand learning, and notes that the EPSS modality fits more within the informal learning definition.

== EPSS versus knowledge management ==
In his book, Bezanson points out that "knowledge management" is the noun corresponding to the verb of "performance support". The knowledge documented in the system plays a critical role in any EPSS system. This concept was originated by Raybould (1997) who separates out the repository, delivery and infrastructure aspects of the EPSS from the knowledge base it contains. In fact, Bezanson emphasizes the advantage that an LMS (learning management system) will interface with the EPSS to supply the knowledge base, content-courseware, or other tracking capabilities that an EPSS may require if the LMS precedes the implementation of the EPSS.

== EPSS versus training ==
EPSS's role in the future of training and work have been noted by followers of the trend towards more informal learning systems driven by knowledge management systems. Tony O'Driscoll (1999) summarizes:

As the pace of technological change speeds up, many jobs will require constant adaptation, because of new information and new task requirements. In this context, the distinction between learning and work will disappear. A trend toward integrating training with on-the-job activities will be a result. This trend will extend itself to the point that training, as a distinct function, will no longer be the primary learning vehicle for many types of jobs. Works will use on-the-job information systems instead.

To this day, analysts such as Forrester's Claire Schooley and Bersin & Associates' Chris Howard write similarly themed articles based on their research in informal learning, technology and training.

== See also ==
- Electronic learning
- Intranet
