= Włodzimierz Dąbrowski =

Polish lawyer and political activist

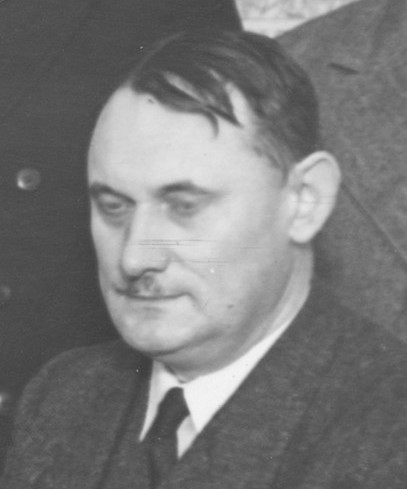
- Dąbrowski in 1938

Personal details
- Born: 11 August 1892 Cieszyn
- Died: 1942 (aged 49–50) Auschwitz

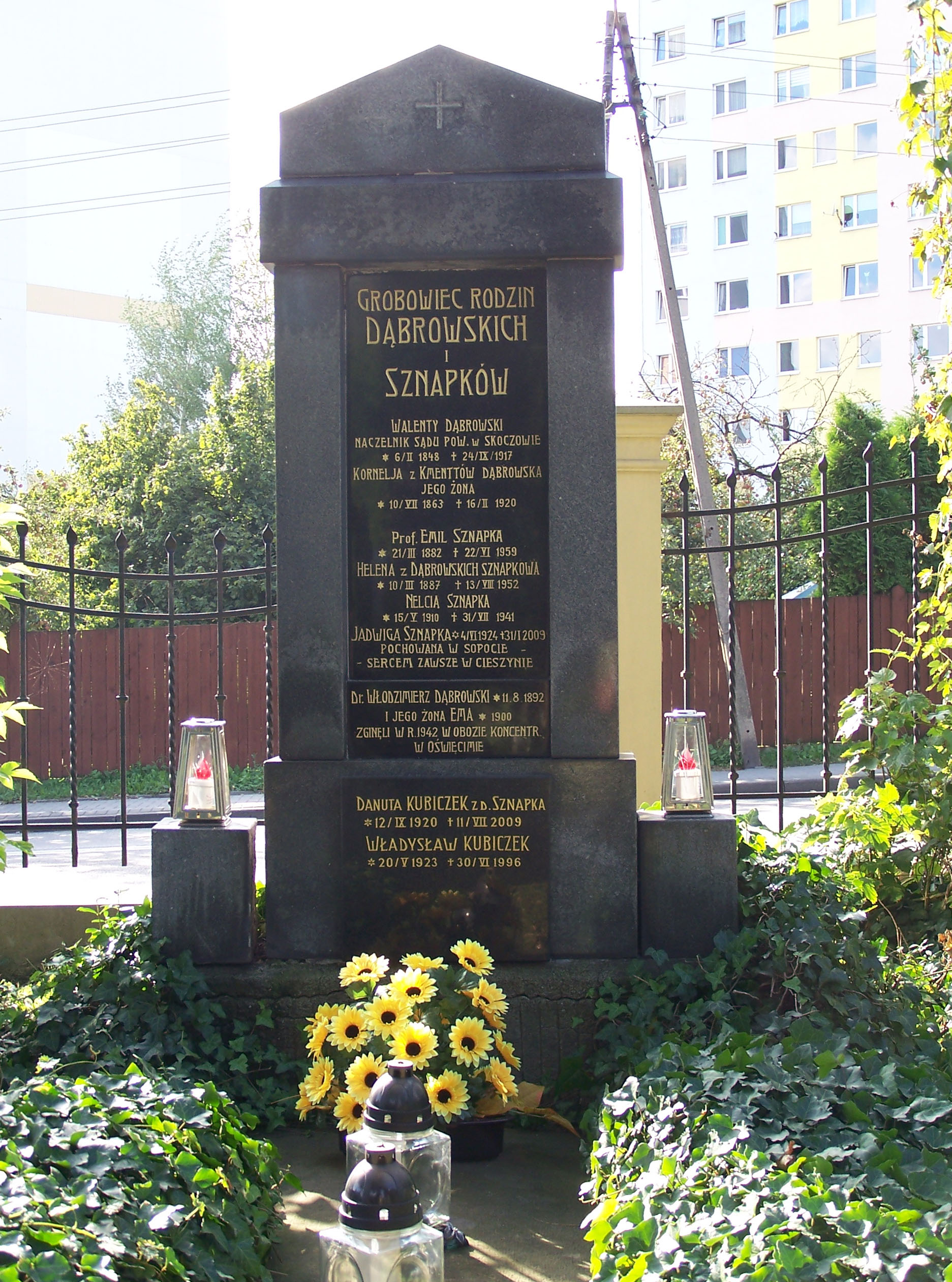
Grave of Dąbrowski and Sznapka families at the Communal Cemetery in Cieszyn

Włodzimierz Dąbrowski (11 August 1892 in Cieszyn – 1942 in Auschwitz) was a Polish lawyer and political activist in Silesia.

Dąbrowski participated in the Silesian Uprisings. He was murdered during World War II by the Germans at Auschwitz concentration camp.

== Works ==
- Rok walki o rządy na Śląsku Cieszyńskim 1919
- Górny Śląsk w walce o zjednoczenie z Polską (Upper Silesia's Struggle for Union with Poland, 1923).

== See also ==
- List of Nazi-German concentration camps
- The Holocaust in Poland
- World War II casualties of Poland
