= German Socialist Labour Party of Poland =

German Socialist Labour Party of Poland Deutsche Sozialistische Arbeitspartei Polens
- Leader: Johann Kowoll
- Founded: August 9, 1925
- Merger of: German Social Democratic Party; German Labour Party of Poland
- Headquarters: Ul. Dworcowa 11, Katowice
- Newspaper: Kattowitzer Volkswille, Lodzer Volkszeitung
- Youth wing: German Labour Youth in Poland (Deutsche Arbeiterjugend in Polen)
- Ideology: Social democracy
- International affiliation: Labour and Socialist International.

The German Socialist Labour Party of Poland (German: Deutsche Sozialistische Arbeitspartei Polens, abbreviated DSAP, Polish: Niemiecka Socjalistyczna Partia Pracy w Polsce) was a political party organizing German Social Democrats in interbellum Poland.

== Party ==
Nominally, the DSAP was founded at a conference in Chorzów on August 9, 1925, through the merger of the Silesia/West Prussia-based German Social Democratic Party of Poland (DSPP) and the Łódź-based German Labour Party of Poland (DAP). The merger was not fully effective, and in practice, the two parties continued separate existences until the merger was finalized in 1929.

An 'Executive of the DSAP' was formed after the nominal founding of the party, consisting of Siegmund Glücksmann, Johann Kowoll, Buchwald, Kociolek, Ludwig Kuk, Klim, Arthur Pankrantz and Emil Zerbe. Kattowitzer Volkswille was assigned as the central party organ. One of the first actions of the party executive was the publication of the 'Manifesto of the united DSAP.

DSAP became the second largest party in the 1927 Lodz city council election, trailing behind the Polish Socialist Party (PPS). DSAP got 16,643 votes and seven seats in the council. In central Poland the municipal elections showed the strength of the party in the region; in total DSAP had 36 city councilors and 7 magistrate members in the area. In 1928, the party claimed to have 8,406 members, out of whom 2,500 were women. The youth wing of the party had around 1,200 members, out of whom 480 were women. The party had an educational organization, Bund für Arbeiterbildung (6,000 members) and a children's organization, Kinderfreudegruppen (300 members).

In June 1928, the Bydgoszcz branch of the party had broken away, forming a separate German Social Democratic Party of Poland.

In Silesia, the situation was somewhat different from that in central Poland. In Upper Silesia, the party did not fare too well in municipal polls. In the 1929 city council election in Katowice, the party mustered to get two seats. In Bielsko, the result was better for the party in local elections. In the 1929 city council election, the party won eight seats (in alliance with the PPS).

On October 6–7, 1929, a conference was held in Lodz, which completed the task of unification of the DSAP set up at Chorzów four years earlier. The conference finally decided to locate the DSAP headquarters in Lodz, an issue that had been a bone of contention for years. Lodzer Volkszeitung was declared as the central party organ. Several representatives of the Labour and Socialist International and socialist parties participated as guests to the Lodz conference, including the SPD leader Johannes Stelling, the PPS chairman Herman Diamand, the leader of the Jewish Bund Henryk Ehrlich.

In October 1930, DSAP suffered another split, as the leftist Heinrich Scheibler broke away and formed the German Socialist Labour Party in Poland – Left (DSAP-Linke). Scheibler was able to take parts of the party organization in the Łódź area with him.

DSAP was fiercely opposed to the pro-National Socialist Young German Party (JdP), which had its base in Bielsko. The rise in popularity of National Socialism amongst the Germans in Poland would prove disastrous for the DSAP. In Upper Silesia, support for the party rapidly eroded after the 1933 Machtübernahme. In September–October 1933, the DSAP joined the call initiated by the Bund for a boycott of goods from Germany, in protest of the Hitler regime. The boycott call became controversial within DSAP, and some members (such as Arthur Kronig, Otto Heike, Ludwig Kuk and Gustav Ewald) left the party as a result. In 1932, the DSAP had 5,429 members in Upper Silesia. By 1937, the number had declined to 560. As of early 1936, the party had only three functioning branches in Upper Silesia, Katowice, Chorzów and Bielszowice. The Bielszowice branch went defunct before the end of the year, though. By March 1937, the remainder of the DSAP branch in Chorzów joined the PPS.

On August 26, 1939, the DSAP signed the joint statement of socialist parties in Poland, calling for the people to fight against Hitlerism (other signatories included the Bund).

The party was a member of the Labour and Socialist International between 1923 and 1940.
