= User onboarding =

Process of improving users' success with a product or service

User onboarding is the process of improving an individual's requirements and success with a product or service. This term is often used in reference to software products, and it can be done in a manual or automated way. It is the process through which new software is designed such that new users are provided and acquire the necessary knowledge, skills, and behaviors in order to become “up and running” and effective users of website, app, or software service.

The term originates from the human resources term, onboarding, that refers to the mechanism through which new employees acquire the necessary knowledge, skills, and behaviors in order to become effective organizational members.

The goal of user onboarding is to get the users to understand the key principles of the product and to show them how it can be useful to them. If it can make the point of the product clear and easy to understand, it can improve the likelihood of acquiring engaged customers.

Offering a free trial is an example of how you can implement user onboarding. If someone is able to see how the product is useful and exciting to them within a free trial period, it can take them from being a user to a consumer—willing to invest in order to continue their experience.

== Onboarding techniques ==
Leveraging the right user onboarding techniques based on the specific requirements can be extremely beneficial for businesses.

Below are different user onboarding techniques and their classifications.

- Single sign-on or social login - Ease the login and add less friction with SSO or Social Login.
- Interactive tutorials, Walkthrough - In-application tutorials that help to onboard new users, highlight features in your application, and also reflect your value proposition faster and easier.
- Beacons, tooltips - Raise visitors attention by adding beacon to any element on the web page.
- Checklists - Leverage gamification effect (see Zeigarnik effect) and provide a clear step-by-step on-boarding flow.
- Coach screens - Opening screens stitched together that appear mostly after the splash screen moves away.
- Training videos - Context-based training videos
