= Silesian Parliament =

1920–1939 legislature of the Silesian Voivodeship, Poland

Silesian Parliament Sejm Śląski
- Legislative body of Silesian Voivodeship (1920–1939)

Type
- Type: Unicameral

History
- Established: 1922
- Disbanded: 1939
- Preceded by: Legislative Sejm (Second Polish Republic)
- Succeeded by: Silesian Regional Assembly

Structure
- Seats: 28 (at dissolution)
- Political groups: Sanation (28)

Elections
- Voting system: Multi-member constituencies
- First election: 24 September 1922
- Last election: 8 September 1935

Meeting place
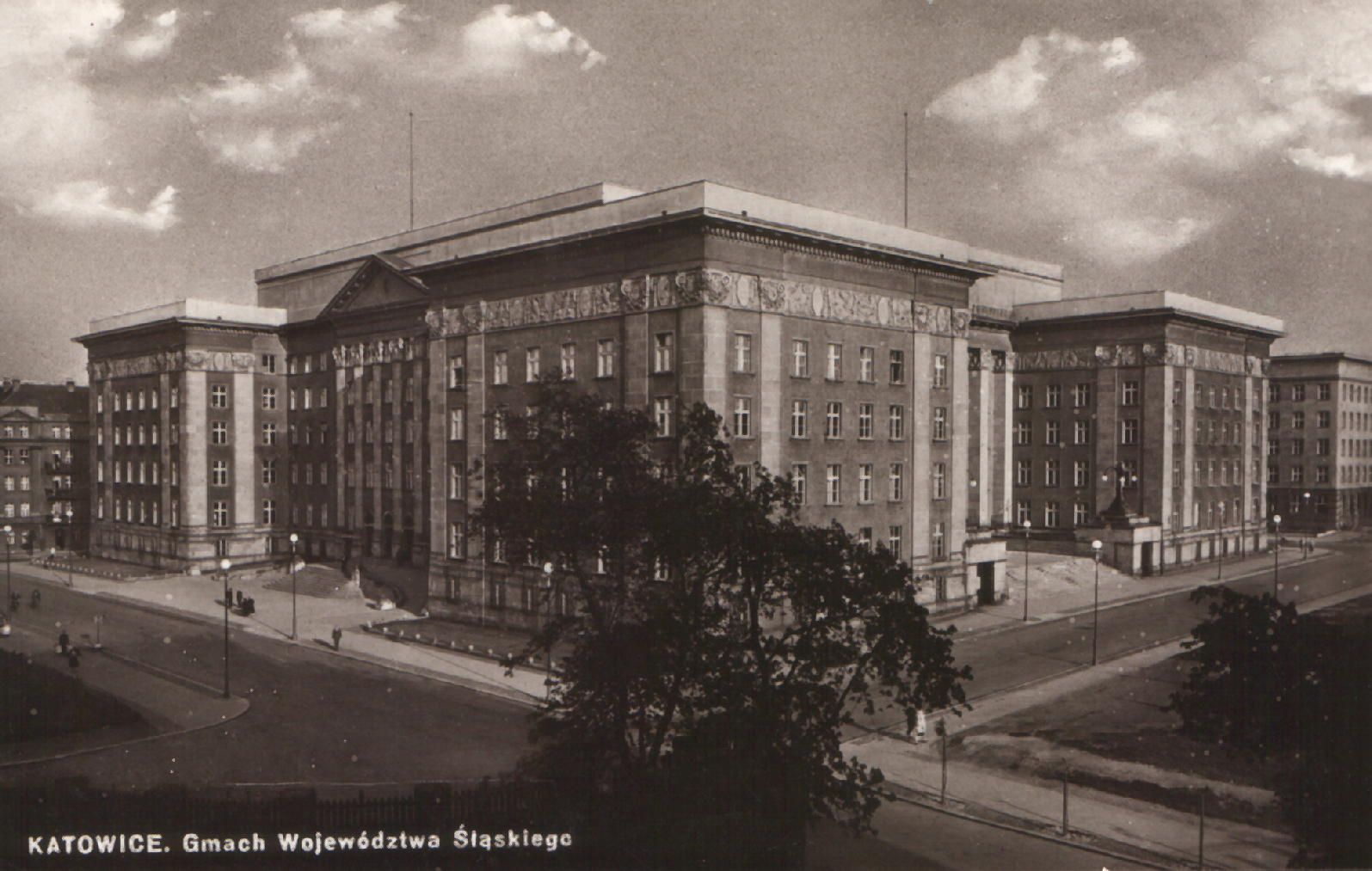
- Silesian Parliament, Katowice

Silesian Parliament or Silesian Sejm (Polish: Sejm Śląski) was the governing body of the Silesian Voivodeship (1920–1939), an autonomous voivodeship of the Second Polish Republic between 1920 and 1945. It was elected in democratic elections and had a certain influence over the usage of taxes collected in Silesia. It consisted of 48 deputies (24 from 1935).

== History ==
The eastern part of Upper Silesia became part of the Second Polish Republic following the Silesian Uprisings throughout the Upper Silesian region between 1918 and 1921, and Upper Silesia Plebiscite. The land was subsequently divided by an allied commission and the League of Nations, leaving the Katowice region on the Polish side. Together with Cieszyn Silesia it formed the Silesian Voievodeship with significant autonomy (Silesian Parliament as a constituency and Silesian Voivodship Council as the executive body).

== Building ==
Designed by architect Ludwik Wojtyczko, the Silesian Parliament was built in 1925–1929 in the Stripped Classicist style. For a very long time it was the biggest structure in Poland. Currently it hosts the offices of the Silesian Voivodship. The building has seven floors and contains one of four paternoster lifts currently in use in Poland. The Polish architect Adolf Szysko-Bohusz announced a competition for the design of the new Silesian Parliament in 1925, who wished the building to espouse the local Polish cultural identity of the region, instead of the more customary German/ Prussian style. When the building was inaugurated in May 1929, Michal Grazynski, President of the Province of Upper Silesia, called the building a "material symbol of Polish culture and power".

The building is one of Poland's official national Historic Monuments (Pomnik historii), as designated on October 22, 2012 and tracked by the National Heritage Board of Poland.

== Composition ==
=== 1922 ===
Political groups	Mandates	
Blok Narodowy	18	
Polish Socialist Party	8	
National Workers' Party	7	
Katolische Volkspartei	12	6
Deutsche Partei	12	6
German Socialists	2	
Piast	1	
Total	48	

=== 1930 (I) ===
Political groups	Mandates	
Katolische Volkspartei	15	10
Deutsche Partei	15	5
German Socialists	1	
Christian democracy	13	
Narodowo-Chrześcijańskie Zjednoczenie Pracy	10	
Polish Socialist Party	4	
National Workers' Party	3	
Communists	2	
Total	48	

=== 1930 (II) ===
Political groups	Mandates	
Narodowo-Chrześcijańskie Zjednoczenie Pracy	19	
Christian democracy	19	
Polish Socialist Party	1	
Katolische Volkspartei	7	5
Deutsche Partei	7	2
German Socialists	2	
Total	48	

=== 1935 ===
Political groups	Mandates
Sanation	24
Total	24

== Leadership ==
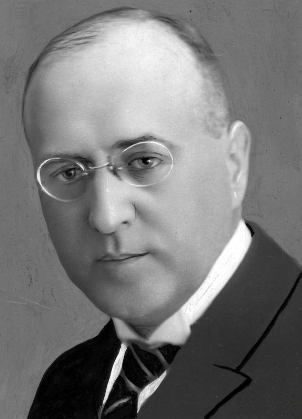
Karol Grzesik

Leadership (1922-29):

- Marshal of the Sejm: Konstanty Wolny;
- Deputy Marshal of the Sejm: Józef Biniszkiewicz, Michał Grajek, Eduard Pant, Kazimierz Rakowski, Edward Rybarz.

Leadership (1930):

- Marshal of the Sejm: Konstanty Wolny;
- Deputy Marshal of the Sejm: Emil Caspari, Włodzimierz Dąbrowski, Eduard Pant.

Leadership (1930-35):

- Marshal of the Sejm: Konstanty Wolny;
- Deputy Marshal of the Sejm: Włodzimierz Dąbrowski, Eduard Pant, Emil Gajdas, Jan Kędzior.

Leadership (1935-39):

- Marshal of the Sejm: Karol Grzesik;
- Deputy Marshal of the Sejm: Włodzimierz Dąbrowski, Alojzy Kot.

== Literature ==
- Nowak Jerzy (kier.): Przewodnik po Katowicach, Wydawnictwo „Śląsk”, Katowice 1962, s. 228;
- Rechowicz Henryk: Sejm Śląski 1922−1939, Wydawnictwo „Śląsk”, Katowice 1971;
- Sala Sejmu Śląskiego to dla nas ważne miejsce (pol.) www.katowice.naszemiasto.pl [dostęp 2011-05-19];
- Wojciech Janota: Katowice między wojnami. Miasto i jego sprawy 1922–1939. Łódź: Księży Młyn, 2010, s. 11, 12. ISBN 978-83-7729-021-7.
