= Živko Topalović =

Yugoslav politician (1886–1972)

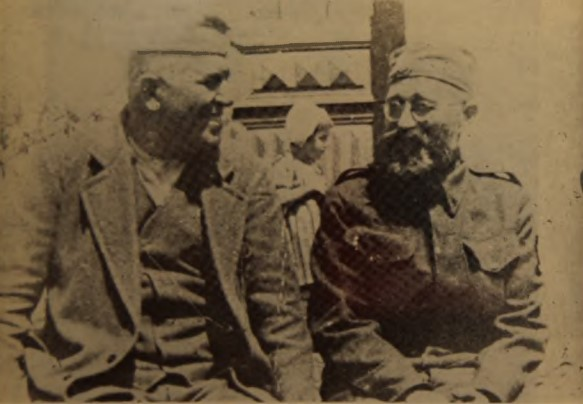
Živko Topalović (left) talking with Draža Mihailović (right)

Živko Topalović (21 March 1886 – 11 February 1972) was a Serbian and Yugoslav socialist politician. Topalović became a leading figure in the Socialist Party of Yugoslavia, founded in 1921. During World War II he became a prominent member of Draža Mihailović's Chetniks.

== Early life ==
Topalović graduated from the Užice high school in 1904. During his time in Užice, he met Dimitrije Tucović, Radovan Dragović and Dragiša Lapčević, the founders of socialism in Serbia and started on the path of a life-long socialist. By the age of 18, he became a union instructor and secretary of the Alliance of Textile Workers of Serbia.

He leaves for Belgrade to successfully pursue his studies in law, obtaining a PhD in criminal law. Between 1910 and 1912 he was in Paris and Berlin, studying further. His studies were cut short by the outbreak of the First Balkan War. As a mobilised reserve officer, he participated in both of the Balkan Wars, most notably the battles of Kumanovo and Bregalnica. After the end of the Second Balkan War, he continued his studies.

== World War I ==
During the First World War, Topalović served as a sublieutenant. He participated in the Cer and Kolubara battles. He was one of the soldiers in the burial detail of Dimitrije Tucović on Vrapče Brdo, after Tucović was killed in action.

Topalović was heavily wounded in the 1914 fights around Belgrade and captured by von Mackensen's forces. Most of the time in captivity, he spent at the K. u. k. Kriegsgefangenenlager Aschach an der Donau concentration camp. He was exchanged in late 1917 in a mass exchange of wounded officers between Serbia and Austria-Hungary. At the behest of the Serbian Red Cross, he held a lecture on Corfu about the conditions that the Serbian POWs faced in Austro-Hungarian captivity, as he served as a liaison between the POWs and the authorities.

== Interwar period ==
Topalović was the leader of the 'centralist' faction in the Communist Party of Yugoslavia, which opposed the worker's revolution. During the party's Second Congress in Vukovar in June 1920, Topalović argued that the situation in Yugoslavia was not revolutionary and that the principles of the Second International should not be followed. Not a single centralist was elected in the party's leadership during the congress, so they left the party and founded their own.

Topalović represented Yugoslavia in the executive of the Labour and Socialist International between May 1923 and January 1929. He shared his seat with the Bulgarian socialist leader Yanko Sakazov until August 1925, then sharing it with Bolesław Drobner of the Independent Socialist Labour Party of Poland until June 1928 and from June 1928 to January 1929 with Joseph Kruk.

During the 1930s, Topalović had good relations with Milan Aćimović, the Belgrade police chief at the time. He was jokingly nicknamed gazda Živko (lit. 'the boss'), as he enriched himself during the interwar period. He was a lawyer by profession.

== World War II ==
During the Second World War, Topalović became a close associate with the Chetnik leader Draža Mihailović. Topalović became the president of the Ba Congress held in village Ba and assembled by Mihailović. During this congress Topalović proposed that Bosnia should be fourth federal unit, besides Serbia, Croatia and Slovenia, but this was opposed by Dragiša Vasić and Stevan Moljević. On the last day of the Ba Congress, Topalović presented his work against Yugoslav Partisans, which was made in reaction to the Second AVNOJ meeting. At the end he made a 'call' to the Partisans to put themselves under Mihalović's command, as 'communists should end civil war they began'.

In the village of Trbušani near Čačak in the end of April 1944, Topalović alongside Miroslav Trifunović and Predrag Raković met with Milan Aćimović and representative of Hermann Neubacher, Nazi delegate for Southeastern Europe. During the meeting, a joint fight against the Partisans was discussed, as well as, arming Chetniks. On 31 May 1944, Topalović left for Italy with his wife alongside Charles Armstrong, British officer on liaison mission to Chetniks. His mission was to help Chetniks through diplomacy, as it was clear that the allies were going to win the war, and the Chetnik position was desperate. Topalović praised Chetniks and attacked Partisans in a report, advising allies to rely on Mihalović. During September Topalović formed the board of Central National Committee in Italy.

His books were banned by the Yugoslav government in 1947.

== Sources ==
- Pavlowitch, Stevan K. (2002). Serbia: The History behind the Name. London: Hurst & Company. ISBN 9781850654773.
- Vesović, Milan; Nikolić, Kosta (1996). Ujedinjene srpske zemlje: ravnogorski nacionalni program. Vreme Knjige.
- Milovanović, Kosta (1983b). Kontrarevolucionarni pokret Draže Mihailovića: Rasulo [Counter-Revolutionary movement of Draža Mihailović: Chaos] (in Serbo-Croatian). Belgrade: Slovo Ljubve. OCLC 491065064.
- Milovanović, Kosta (1983c). Kontrarevolucionarni pokret Draže Mihailovića: Slom [Counter-Revolutionary movement of Draža Mihailović: Collapse] (in Serbo-Croatian). Belgrade: Slovo Ljubve. OCLC 491065064.
