= Labour and Socialist International =

International political party (1923–1940)

- Founded: 21 May 1923; 103 years ago
- Dissolved: 3 April 1940; 86 years ago
- Preceded by: Berne International; Vienna International
- Succeeded by: Socialist International
- Headquarters: London; Zurich; Brussels
- Ideology: Socialism
- Political position: Centre-left to left-wing
- Colors: Red

The Labour and Socialist International (LSI) (Note: German: Sozialistische Arbeiter-Internationale (SAI)) was an international organization of socialist and labourist parties, active between 1923 and 1940. The group was established through a merger of the rival Vienna International and the Berne International, and was the forerunner of the present-day Socialist International.

The LSI had a history of rivalry with the Communist International (Comintern), with which it competed over the leadership of the international socialist and labour movement. However, unlike the Comintern, the LSI maintained no direct control over the actions of its sections, being constituted as a federation of autonomous national parties.

== History ==
=== Founding ===
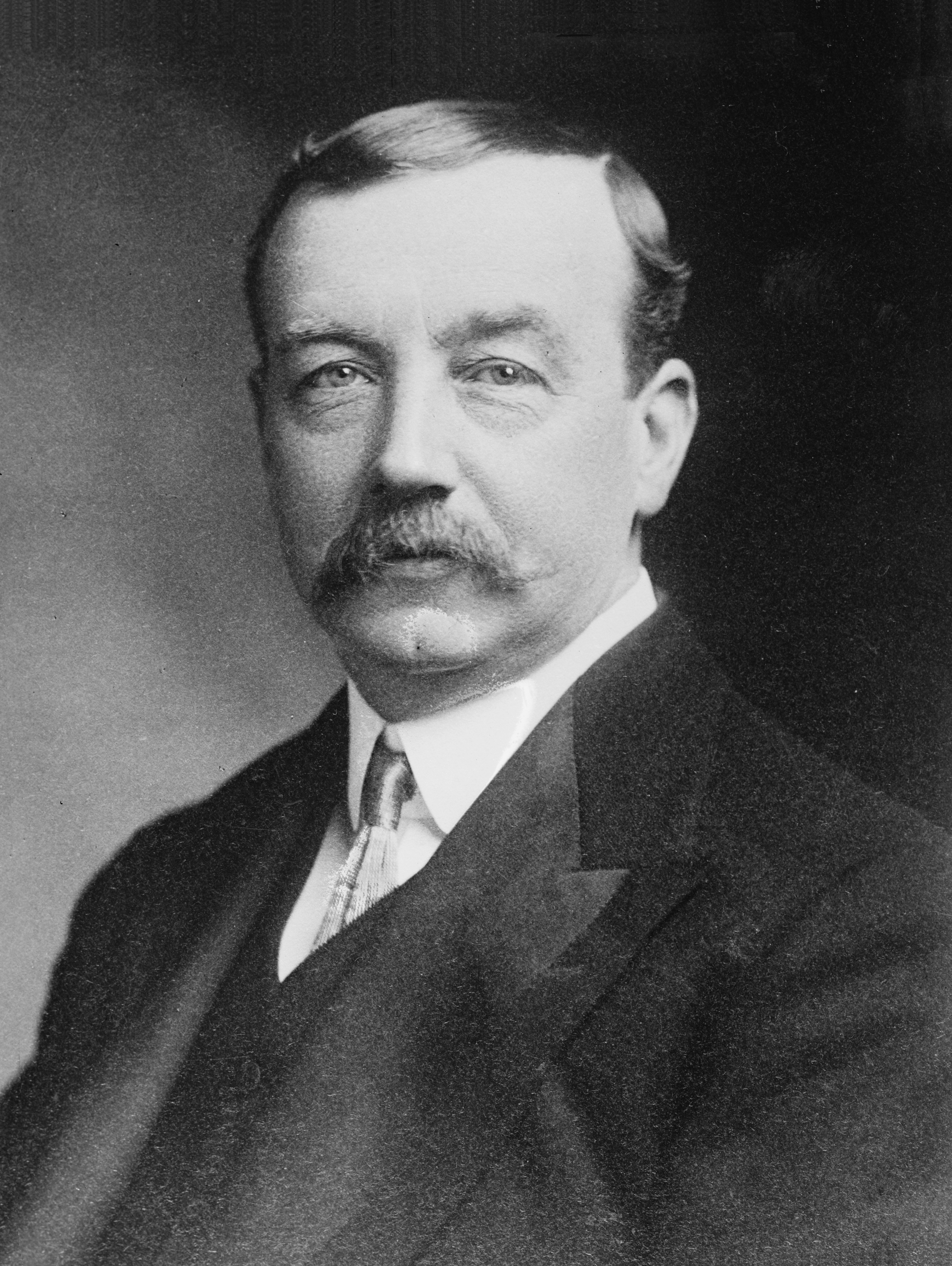
Arthur Henderson (1863–1935) of the British Labour Party was chosen as the first chairman of the executive committee of the LSI in 1923.

Despite the hostility expressed by the Communist International, the left wing of the social democratic movement sought an international "union of the whole proletariat" through 1922. This initiative finally came to a close at the end of the year with the convocation of the 4th World Congress of the Comintern, which decisively rejected calls for a broad and inclusive international body.

This rejection by the Communist wing of the international socialist movement left the center and right — in the form of the Vienna International and the London International, respectively — to patch together their own joint international body. Planning for such a body began in January 1923, a month after the conclusion of the Comintern's 4th World Congress, with the Executive Committees of the Vienna and London groups issuing a joint statement condemning the Communists' decision. The two Executive Committees subsequently issued a convention call for a unification congress in May.

On May 21, 1923, some 620 delegates representing 41 socialist political parties in 30 countries was convened in Hamburg, Germany to bring about the unification of the two Internationals. A wide array of political tendencies were represented among these delegates, running the ideological gamut from activists in the left wing of the French Section of the Workers' International (SFIO) and the Independent Social Democratic Party of Germany (USPD) to moderate reformists of the British Labour Party.

The gathering was dominated by 80 delegates of the Social Democratic Party of Germany (SPD), including among its membership such esteemed leaders of the international socialist movement as Karl Kautsky, Eduard Bernstein, and Rudolf Hilferding. Other prominent figures in attendance included Arthur Henderson and Sidney Webb of the British Labour Party; Friedrich Adler and Otto Bauer, and Karl Renner of the Social Democratic Party of Austria (SPÖ); Emile Vandervelde and Camille Huysmans of the Belgian Labour Party (BWP); and the émigré Russian Mensheviks Pavel Axelrod, Raphael Abramovitch, and Fyodor Dan, among others.

The unity congress voted to establish itself as a new International under the name "Labour and Socialist International" (LSI). In marked difference from the Communist movement, no preconditions were established for admission, nor was any binding policy program adopted. Instead the Hamburg Congress issued a manifesto stating that the new International "must grow naturally from the process through which Socialist parties get adapted to one another." Total agreement on fundamental principles was not expected "at the moment of its birth," but the desire was voiced that establishment of the new international body would over time serve as "one of the most important conditions for the harmonizing of their views."

=== Structure ===
The LSI was to remain a federation of fully independent and autonomous political parties — groups which were freely allowed under organizational statutes to determine their own internal policies and programs. The organization was modeled upon the old Second International, with supreme authority vested in the international congress, which could be convened at any time upon the demand of 10 or more affiliated parties, so long as these represented at least a quarter of the organization's voting strength.

Governance between congresses was to be conducted by an executive committee, with its participants elected by the member parties. The executive committee was given the power to elect its own chair and other officers, to determine the location for its central office, and to elect a 9-member Bureau for prior consideration of matters of concern in advance of meetings of the full Executive Committee. The executive committee was additionally to establish a 6-member special committee of local members residing at or near the seat of the committee, who were to be responsible for supervising the work of the Executive and its officers and arranging meetings of the Bureau and the executive committee.

The first Executive Committee, elected by the 1923 Hamburg Congress, included Arthur Henderson of the British Labour Party as chairman, Harry Gosling of the British Labour Party as treasurer, with the Austrian Friedrich Adler and the Englishman Tom Shaw joining as members of the group's Secretariat. London was chosen as the seat of the executive committee.

=== Development ===
The LSI functioned as a continuation of the Second International, and was often referred to as the "Second International" by the Comintern.

The Social Democratic Party of Germany was the dominant party within the LSI.

=== Response to Nazism ===
The rise of Nazism in Germany increased pressure on the LSI and Comintern to cooperate. On 19 February 1933, the LSI Bureau issued a call for joint action of the SPD and the Communist Party of Germany against Adolf Hitler's regime. The Comintern responded by stating that they were not convinced of the sincerity of the declaration. However, the Comintern did soon call its national sections to form united fronts together with social democratic parties locally. The LSI, on its side, did not accept the notion of local social democrats forming united fronts with the Communist parties. However, as the Comintern adopted a more conciliatory tone, the resistance of the LSI against forming such united fronts on the national level softened.

Within the LSI, a north–south cleavage emerged, as the Mediterranean LSI parties built fronts with the Communists whilst the British and Scandinavian parties rejected the notion of cooperation with the communists. With the German party in disarray, the British and Scandinavians became more influential within the LSI. Thus the space for socialist-Communist cooperation decreased. On 25 September 1934, the Comintern Executive issued a call for 'peace negotiations' between the two internationals, but the LSI rejected the offer.

After the outbreak of the Spanish Civil War, the LSI and the International Federation of Trade Unions launched an 'Aid for Spain' campaign. The LSI/IFTU relief efforts were channelled through the Spanish Socialist Workers' Party (PSOE) and Unión General de Trabajadores (UGT).

=== Colonial question ===
As with other matters, the LSI did not have a uniform position on the colonial question. The Labour Party, the largest Party LSI supported reform of colonial administration rather than opposing colonialism, while the French SFIO position was unclear or divided; by contrast, the Austrian and Scandinavian parties were more anti-colonial. Regarding the Rif War, the second LSI congress, held in Marseille August 22–27, 1925, adopted a resolution calling for support of the independence of the Rif and urging the League of Nations to accept the Rif Republic as a member.

Many issues were divisive, including the China question. Another notable point of contention inside the league concerned the period participation of the British Independent Labour Party in the League against Imperialism, an organisation formed at the behest of the Comintern and which operated during the 1920s, seeking to gain in addition to Comintern parties, the membership and support of certain European LSI parties as well as anti-colonial Parties in the colonised world. The majority of the LSI leadershup regarded it as an instrument of the Comintern front organisation and the LSI congress asked the ILP to break its ties with the League.

== Congresses ==
Congress	Location	Date	Notes and references
1st Congress	Hamburg, Germany	May 21–25, 1923	
2nd Congress	Marseille, France	August 22–27, 1925	
3rd Congress	Brussels, Belgium	August 5–11, 1928	
4th Congress	Vienna, Austria	July 25-Aug. 1, 1931	
Conference	Paris, France	August 21–25, 1933	

== List of members of the LSI ==
Country	Party	LSI membership	LSI Executive representatives
Argentina	Socialist Party	1924–1940	Etchegoin (March 1925 – August 1927), Bernardo B. Delom (August 1928 – February 1934), Dino Rondani ^{s} (February 1934 – 1940)
Armenian Soviet Socialist Republic	Armenian Revolutionary Federation	1923–1940	Mikayel Varandian (May 1923 – March 1925, from 1924 shared seat with Kaplansky, July 1933 – April 1934), Archak Izakchjan (March 1925 – July 1933), Setrak Sassuni (April 1934 – December 1936), Vahan Champarzumian ^{s} (December 1936 – 1939), Hrant Samuelian (1939–1940)
Austria	Social Democratic Workers Party of Austria	1923–1940	Otto Bauer ^{b} (May 1923 – July 1938), Ferdinand Skaret (May 1923 – October 1931), Robert Danneberg (October 1931 – December 1935), Karl Seitz (October 1931 – December 1935), Franz Korac (December 1935 – 1938), Joseph Buttinger (1939/1940, under the pseudonym 'Gustav Richter')
Austria	Czechoslovak Social Democratic Workers Party in the Republic of Austria	1923–1940	Alois Wawrousek (August 1925 – 1937)
Belgium	Belgian Labour Party	1923–1940	Louis de Brouckère (May 1923 – May 1939, ^{b} August 1935-), Emile Vandervelde ^{b} (May 1923 – June 1925, November 1927 – March 1935, February 1937 – December 1938), Joseph Van Roosbroeck (June 1927 – 1940, became the treasurer of LSI in November 1927), Camille Huysmans (August 1931 – 1940), Désiré Bouchery (March 1935 – June 1936), Arthur Wauters (August 1935 – February 1937), Jean Delvigne (June 1936 – 1937, ^{b} September 1936-), Max Buset (1937–1940), Achille Delattre (1938–1940)
British Guiana	British Guiana Labour Union	1924–1940	
Kingdom of Bulgaria	Bulgarian Social Democratic Workers' Party (Broad Socialists)	1923–1940	Yanko Sakazov (May 1923 – 1940, until August 1925 seat shared with Živko Topalović)
Republic of China	Social Democratic Party of China	1920s	
Czechoslovakia	Czechoslovak Social Democratic Workers Party	1923–1938	Antonín Němec (May 1924 – August 1925), František Soukup (August 1925 – September 1938, ^{b} 1932-), Lev Winter (August 1931 – August 1935), Josef Stivín (August 1935 – September 1938), Gustav Winter (1937–1938)
Czechoslovakia	German Social Democratic Workers Party in the Czechoslovak Republic	1923–1938	Ludwig Czech (May 1923 – February 1930), Siegfried Taub (February 1930 – 1938), Wenzel Jaksch (1939–1940)
Czechoslovakia	Hungarian-German Social Democratic Party	1923–1926	
Czechoslovakia	Polish Socialist Workers Party	1923–1938	Chobot (1931–, shared seat with Johann Kowoll)
Czechoslovakia	Social Democratic Workers' Party in Subcarpathian Rus'	1923–1930	
Czechoslovakia	Socialist Association	1923–1925	
Denmark	Social Democratic Federation	1923–1940	Thorvald Stauning (May 1923 – April 1924, January 1927 – May 1929), Carl Madsen (May 1923 – October 1928), Alsing Andersen (April 1924 – January 1927, May 1929 – November 1935), Vilhelm Nygaard (October 1928 – December 1936), Hans Hedtoft (November 1935 – 1940, ^{b} May 1936-), Eiler Jensen (February 1938 – 1940)
Estonia	Estonian Socialist Workers' Party	1923–1940	August Rei (February 1931 – November 1932, December 1933 – 1937)
Finland	Social Democratic Party	1923–1940	Karl Wiik (May 1923 – 1938), Jaakko William Keto ^{b} (1939–1940)
France	French Section of the Workers' International	1923–1940	Alexandre Marie Desrousseaux ^{b} (May 1923 – May 1936), Jean Longuet (May 1923 – 1939), Pierre Renaudel (August 1925 – June 1929, July 1930 – November 1933), Léon Blum (June 1929 – July 1930, May 1934 – May 1936, ^{b} June 1939 – 1940), Jean-Baptiste Séverac (November 1936 – 1940), Jean Zyromski (-November 1936), Marceau Pivert (1938), Salomon Grumbach (1939–1940)
Free City of Danzig	Social Democratic Party of the Free City of Danzig	1923–1936	Arthur Brill (January 1929 – 1936, July 1931- seat shared with Johann Kowoll)
Germany	Social Democratic Party of Germany	1923–1940	Arthur Crispien (May 1923 – May 1926), Hermann Müller (May 1923 – June 1928, February 1931 – March 1931), Otto Wels ^{b} (May 1923-Summer of 1938), Johannes Stelling (June 1928 – February 1931, Summer of 1938), Hans Vogel (1931–1938), Rudolf Hilferding (May 1936 – 1937, 1939/1940),
Georgian Soviet Socialist Republic	Social Democratic Labour Party of Georgia	1923–1940	Irakli Tsereteli (May 1923 – July 1929), Constantin Gvardjaladze (July 1929 – 1940)
United Kingdom	Labour Party	1923–1940	Arthur Henderson (^{b} May 1923 – January 1924, February 1925 – July 1929, ^{b} August 1925-), James Ramsay MacDonald (May 1923 – January 1924), James Henry Thomas (May 1923 – January 1924), Harry Gosling (May 1923 – January 1924, Treasurer of LSI), Alexander Gordon Cameron (January 1924 – February 1925), Cramp (January 1924 – October 1925, ^{b} July 1925 -), William Gillies (July 1929 – 1940, ^{b} May 1930-), Joseph Compton (October 1929 – January 1937), George Dallas (October 1936 – 1940), Hugh Dalton (October 1936 – 1940), Arthur Jenkins (January 1937-late c. 1937)
United Kingdom	Independent Labour Party	1923–1933	Wallhead (February 1924 – August 1925, Treasurer of LSI), Clifford Allen (January 1924 – November 1927), Fenner Brockway (November 1927 – November 1932)
Second Hellenic Republic	Socialist Party of Greece	1923–1931, 1933	
Kingdom of Hungary	Hungarian Social Democratic Party	1923–1940	Peidl (February 1924 – October 1928), Ernő Garami (May 1930 – March 1931), Emanuel Buchinger (March 1931 – 1940)
Kingdom of Hungary	Világosság Socialist Emigrant Group	1923–1940	Vilmos Böhm (August 1931 – 1940)
Kingdom of Iceland	Social Democratic Party	1926–1940	
Italy	United Socialist Party of Italian Workers	1922–1930	Giuseppe Emanuele Modigliani ^{b} (May 1923 – 1938), Claudio Treves (May 1923 – July 1930, August 1931 – June 1933), Pietro Nenni (July 1930 – 1940), Franco Clerici (June 1933 – March 1934)
Italy	Italian Socialist Party	1930–1940	Giuseppe Emanuele Modigliani ^{b} (May 1923 – 1938), Claudio Treves (May 1923 – July 1930, August 1931 – June 1933), Pietro Nenni (July 1930 – 1940), Franco Clerici (June 1933 – March 1934)
Latvia	Latvian Social Democratic Workers Party	1923–1934	Fēlikss Cielēns [lv] (May 1923 – April 1924, February 1928 – April 1932, 1938–1940), Brūno Kalniņš (April 1924 – February 1928), Fricis Menders [lv] (April 1932 – 1938)
Latvia	Socialist Workers and Peasants Party of Latvia	1934–1940	Fēlikss Cielēns [lv] (May 1923 – April 1924, February 1928 – April 1932, 1938–1940), Brūno Kalniņš (April 1924 – February 1928), Fricis Menders [lv] (April 1932 – 1938)
Lithuania	Lithuanian Social Democratic Party	1923–1940	Steponas Kairys (November 1931 – November 1934)
Luxembourg	Workers Party of Luxembourg	1923–1940	Jean Fohrman (February 1936 – 1939), Alphonse Hummer (1939–1940)
Netherlands	Social Democratic Workers Party	1923–1940	Pieter Jelles Troelstra ^{b} (May 1923 – May 1925), Willem Vliegen ^{b} (May 1925 – 1930), Floor Wibaut (August 1925 – April 1935), Willem Albarda ^{b} (April 1930 – August 1939), Koos Vorrink (April 1935 – 1940)
Norway	Social Democratic Labour Party of Norway	1923–1927	Magnus Nilssen (May 1923 – January 1927)
Norway	Norwegian Labour Party	1938–1940	Martin Tranmæl (1939/1940), Einar Gerhardsen (1939–1940)
British Mandate for Palestine	Poalei Zion	1923–1930	Shlomo Kaplansky (shared seat with Mikayel Varandian May 1923 – June 1924, 1925–1940)
British Mandate for Palestine	Mapai	1930–1940	Shlomo Kaplansky (shared seat with Mikayel Varandian May 1923 – June 1924, 1925–1940)
Poland	Polish Socialist Party	1923–1940	Herman Diamand (May 1923 – February 1931), Mieczysław Niedziałkowski (August 1925 – 1940), Herman Lieberman (1931–1940, ^{b}1932-)
Poland	German Socialist Labour Party of Poland	1923–1940	Johann Kowoll (January 1929 – June 1936, 1929 – July 1931 seat shared with Brill, July 1931- seat shared with Chobot), Emil Zerbe (June 1936 – 1940)
Poland	Independent Socialist Labour Party	1923–1933	Bolesław Drobner (May 1923 – June 1928), Joseph Kruk (June 1928 – October), both shared their seat with Topalović
Poland	General Jewish Labour Bund in Poland	1930–1940	Henryk Erlich (December 1930 – 1940)
Poland	Ukrainian Socialist-Radical Party	1931–1940	Matthew Stachiw (August 1931 – 1940)
Portugal	Portuguese Socialist Party	1925–1933	
Kingdom of Romania	Romanian Social Democratic Party	1923–1940	Șerban Voinea (May 1923 – December 1923), Iacob Pistiner (May 1923 – August 1930), Gheorghe Grigorovici (January 1931 – May 1933), Ilie Moscovici (May 1933 – 1940)
Russian SFSR	Russian Social Democratic Labour Party (Mensheviks)	1923–1940	Raphael Abramovitch ^{b} (May 1923 – 1940)
Russian SFSR	Socialist Revolutionary Party	1923–1940	V. V. Sukhomlin (May 1923 – May 1930), Viktor Chernov (May 1923 – 1940)
Spanish Republic	Spanish Socialist Workers' Party	1923–1940	Julián Besteiro (May 1924 – October 1932), Largo Caballero (October 1932 – November 1932, September 1933 – September 1936), Remigio Cabello (November 1932 – September 1933), Fernando de los Ríos (September 1933 – 1937), Manuel Cordero Pérez (September 1933 – 1938)
Sweden	Social Democratic Labour Party of Sweden	1923–1940	Hjalmar Branting ^{b} (May 1923 – October 1924), Gustav Möller (May 1923 – October 1924, ^{b} July 1929 – September 1932), Arthur Engberg (October 1924 – July 1926), Rickard Lindström (October 1924 – July 1926, ^{b} September 1932 – 1940), Per-Albin Hansson (July 1926 – September 1932), Zeth Höglund (September 1932 – 1940)
Switzerland	Social Democratic Party of Switzerland	1927–1940	Robert Grimm (January 1927 – 1940, ^{b} August 1935-)
Turkey	Independent Socialist Party		
Ukrainian Soviet Socialist Republic	Ukrainian Social Democratic Labour Party	1923–1940	Yosyp Bezpalko (June 1924 – February 1929), Opanas Fedenko (February 1929 – 1938)
Uruguay	Socialist Party of Uruguay	1932–1940	
United States	Socialist Party of America	1923–1940	Victor L. Berger (May 1923 – August 1929), Morris Hillquit (May 1923 – October 1933), Norman Thomas (December 1932 – 1940), James Oneal (November 1933 – October 1935), Devere Allen (October 1935 – 1936)
Kingdom of Yugoslavia	Socialist Party of Yugoslavia	1923–1929, 1934–1940	Živko Topalović (May 1923 – January 1929, until August 1925 seat shared with Sakazov, August 1925 – June 1928 seat shared with Drobner, June 1928- seat shared with Kruk)

^{b} = Bureau member

Other executive members: International Women's Commission: Adelheid Popp (February 1924 – September 1935), Alice Pels (September 1935 – 1940) Socialist Youth International: Karl Heinz (February 1924 – October 1932), Erich Ollenhauer (October 1932 – 1940)
