= Social Democratic Workers' Party =

Social Democratic Workers' Party may refer to one of the following parties:

- Social Democratic Workers' Party (Netherlands)
- Social Democratic Workers' Party of Austria
- Social Democratic Workers' Party of Germany
- Latvian Social Democratic Workers' Party
- Estonian Social Democratic Workers' Party
- Russian Social Democratic Labour Party
- Swedish Social Democratic Workers' Party
- German Social Democratic Workers' Party in the Czechoslovak Republic
- Czechoslovak Social Democratic Workers' Party
- Czechoslovak Social Democratic Workers Party in the Republic of Austria
- Social Democratic Workers' Party in Subcarpathian Rus'
