= Világosság Socialist Emigrant Group =

The Világosság Socialist Emigrant Group (Hungarian: Világosság Szocialista Emigráns Csoport) was a Hungarian socialist organization, founded in 1920. The centre of the organization was based in Austria, its founders were mainly former members of the Hungarian Social Democratic Party (MSZDP) who had been forced into exile after the crushing of the Hungarian Soviet Republic. The organization published the monthly Világosság ('Clarity') from 1923 to 1933 in Vienna.

Sándor Garbai, Antal Dovcsák and Vilmos Böhm were chairmen of the group. Zsigmond Kunfi was the secretary of the organization from 1920 until his suicide in 1929. From 1929 onwards, Zoltán Rónai served as the secretary of the organization.

The group was in close contact with the Social Democratic Workers Party of Austria (SDAPÖ). It took part in founding the Vienna International (the 2½ International) in 1921. Its relations with MSZDP were not that good, the Világosság repeatedly criticized the moderate leadership of the MSZDP. Világosság was supportive of the leftist opposition within MSZDP that emerged in 1922. It refused to cooperate with the communists, though. The group supported the founding of the Socialist Workers Party of Hungary.

After the defeat of the February Uprising in Austria in 1934, the group continued its activities in France and other countries. The group retained the name Világosság.

The Világosság organization was a member of the Labour and Socialist International between 1923 and 1940. Vilmos Böhm represented the organization in the Executive of the Labour and Socialist International from August 1931 to 1940, being a member with consultative voice.
