= Leopold Lojka =

Czech chauffeur and soldier (1886–1926)

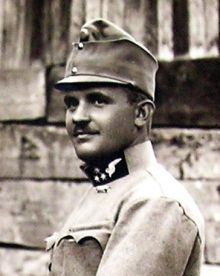
- Born: 17 September 1886; Telč, Moravia, Austria-Hungary
- Died: 18 July 1926 (aged 39); Brno, Czechoslovakia
- Other names: Leopold Loyka
- Occupations: chauffeur, innkeeper, soldier
- Known for: the chauffeur of Archduke Franz Ferdinand at the time of Ferdinand's assassination in Sarajevo in 1914.
- Partner: Anna Lhotská
- Children: František and Alfréd Lojka
- Parents: Václav Lojka (father); Marie, née Jašová (mother)

Leopold Lojka (also spelt Leopold Loyka; 17 September 1886 – 18 July 1926) was a Czech chauffeur, soldier and innkeeper. He was the chauffeur of the car carrying Austro-Hungarian Archduke Franz Ferdinand at the time of Ferdinand's assassination in Sarajevo in 1914.

== Early life ==
Lojka was born on 17 September 1886 in Telč, Moravia, Austria-Hungary to coach driver Václav Lojka and Marie, née Jašová. After graduating from general school in Telč, he trained as a butcher from 1907 to 1909. Lojka joined the Austro-Hungarian Army as a young man. During a maneuver in 1909, he distinguished himself when he recaptured some horses that had gone through in panic, for which he received a reward of 300 crowns. The Bohemian landowner and enthusiastic motorist Franz Graf Harrach, who witnessed this incident, then hired Lojka as his driver – impressed by his courage and efficiency and Lojka worked for Harrach from 1910 to 1914.

== Sarajevo assassination ==
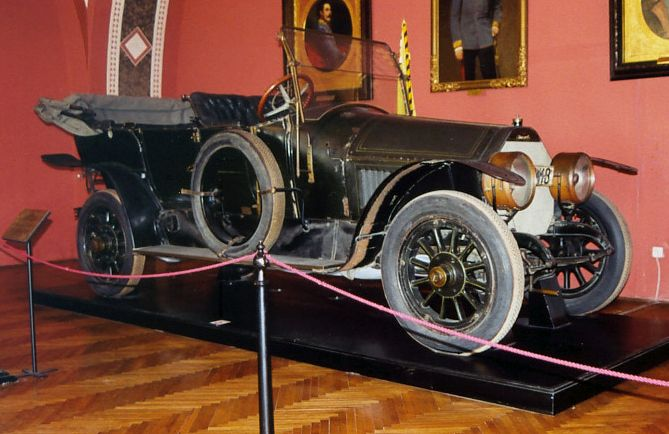
The Gräf & Stift motor car ridden in by the Archduke Franz Ferdinand at the time of his assassination

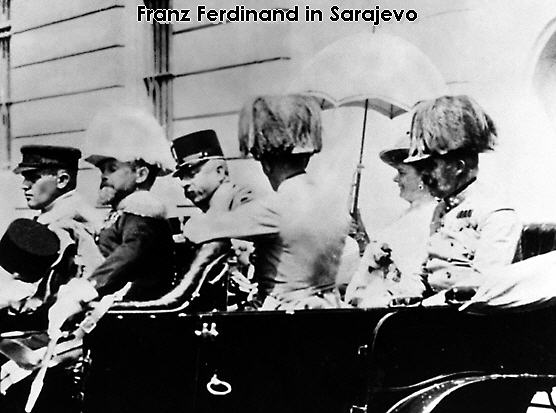
Leopold Lojka (leftmost) in Sarajevo driving the car with Franz Ferdinand d'Este, his wife and their entourage

In June 1914, Lojka accompanied his employer and his friend Archduke Franz Ferdinand, the heir to the throne of the Austro-Hungarian Empire, on a trip to Bosnia and Herzegovina. There, on 26 and 27 June, the Archduke, in his capacity as "Inspector of the entire armed forces", took part as an observer in a manoeuvre of the Austro-Hungarian Army outside Sarajevo. A visit to the city itself was planned for 28 June at the end of the trip.

For this purpose, Harrach had provided the Archduke with his car, a double phaeton (28/32 hp) from Gräf & Stift, and driver. As a result, Lojka was given the task of picking up the Archduke and his companions at Sarajevo railway station on the morning of 28 June and driving them to the city centre and all other destinations on the day's agenda.

In Franz Ferdinand's motorcade, which consisted of seven vehicles, the "heir to the throne" vehicle, with Lojka at the wheel, sitting on the right-hand side, drove in third place. On the way from the railway station to the town hall, there was the first assassination attempt: the young Nedeljko Čabrinović tried to throw a grenade at Franz Ferdinand's car. This attempt failed – not least thanks to Lojka's presence of mind. After a visit to the town hall, the journey was resumed. In order to prevent further attacks, however, those responsible had decided to change the route: Instead of driving back only a little way along the Appelkai, over which they had travelled, as originally planned and announced in the newspapers, and then turning right into the city centre at Franz-Josef-Straße; they now wanted to forego turning and instead take the full route along the Appelkai on the banks of the Miljacka put back. Lojka, like the two drivers in front of him, who had not been informed of this decision, instead turned right at the corner of Appelkai-Franz-Josef-Straße, in accordance with the original route known to him. Oskar Potiorek, the head of Bosnia, who was the Archduke's host and was also in Lojka's car, then shouted to him to stop, as this was "the wrong way", and to turn around. When Lojka shifted into reverse gear to back up the vehicle, it stood still for a few seconds. At that moment, Gavrilo Princip — a young Bosnian and supporter of the nationalist movement Mlada Bosna — was standing on the side of the road at the exact spot where the vehicle stopped. He used the opportunity to fire two shots at the occupants at close range. These fatally injured Franz Ferdinand and his expectant wife Sophie.

After the assassination attempt – the fatal outcome of which was overlooked for a few seconds, as it was believed that the heir to the throne had only been slightly injured and his wife had fainted – Lojka turned the vehicle around on Potiorek's instructions and steered it to his official residence, the so-called Konak. Once there, the Archduke and his wife died within a few minutes. Immediately afterwards, Lojka sent three telegrams (to Emperor Franz Joseph, Emperor Wilhelm II and the Archduke's children) on behalf of the head of the country, Oskar Potiorek and/or Colonel Carl von Bardolff, informing the world about the assassination and death of Archduke Franz Ferdinand.

== After the assassination ==
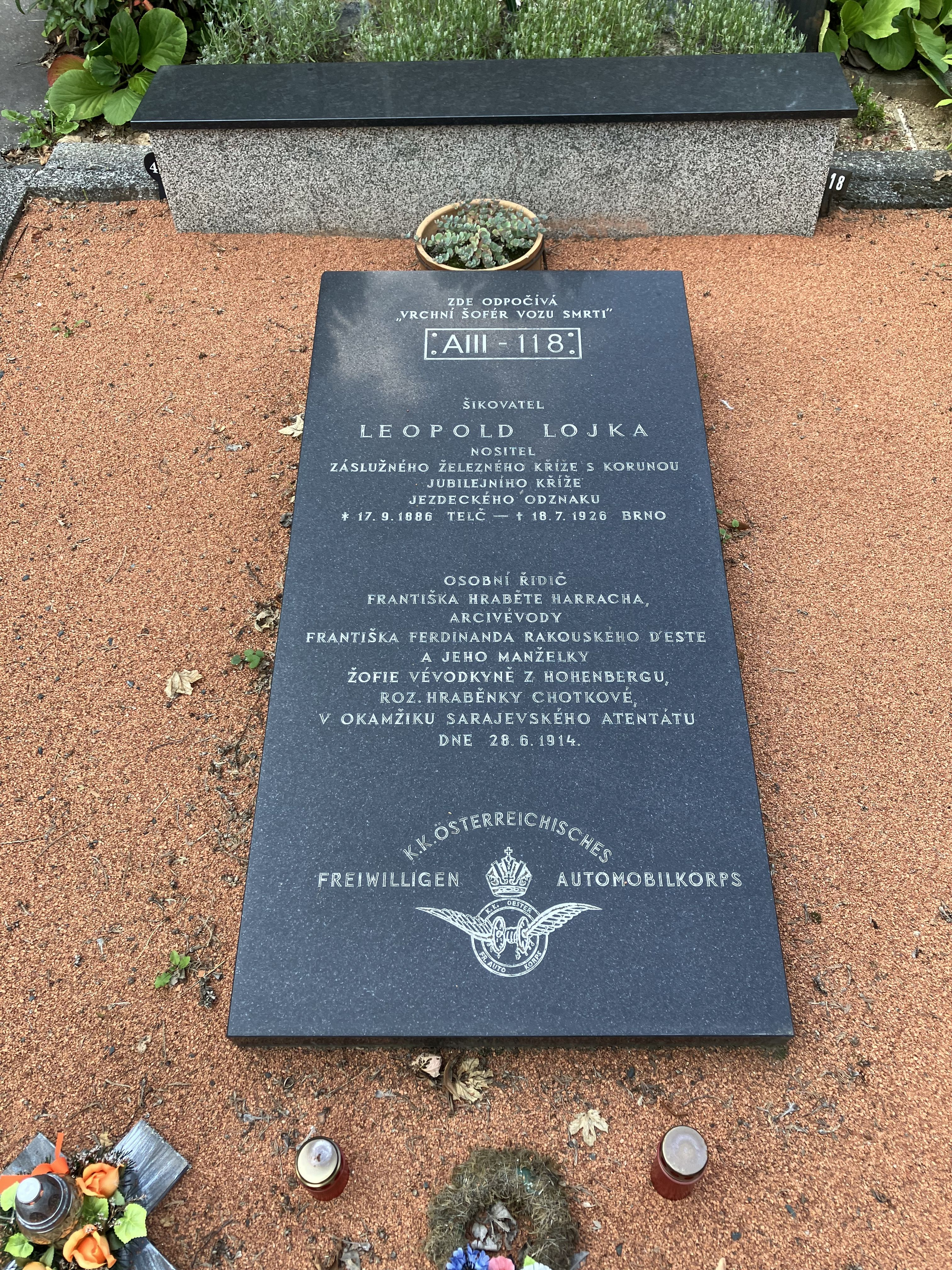
Grave of Lojka at Brno Central Cemetery

On 29 June, Lojka and Andreas Freiherr von Morsey identified Princip as the assassin in a confrontation ("It's him, the murderer"). He then appeared as a witness for the prosecution in the Sarajevo trial of the assassins and their accomplices.

After the war, Lojka settled in Znojmo, where he ran an inn, which he sold in 1925. He then moved to Brno, where he opened a new inn, which he ran until his death in 1926. In addition, Lojka distinguished himself at this time through a series of interviews and reports in which he described the events of 28 June and thus became a world-famous figure for a time.

== Historical obituary ==
On 1 August 1926, an obituary appeared in the Deutsche Zeitung:

"A few days ago, the innkeeper Leopold Lojka died in Brno. The people of Brno commemorated his death as if he had been one of the first in their city. He was not one of the highs of Brno, nor was he a political figure, just an innkeeper whom no one knew but the people of Brno. But years ago his name was mentioned all over the world, for the sake of the few short minutes for which fate had assigned him a place in the focal point of world history: for close behind his back the flames of the world conflagration were fanned. He was the chauffeur of Archduke Franz Ferdinand, he drove his car on the day of the accident.

Later, the emperor Karl took Lojka into his service, and when the coup came, he was compensated with 400,000 crowns, with which he bought an inn in Brno. His past made him a well-known figure in the city, and many came to hear him tell of the journey of terror and to see the relics, the bloody suspenders of the Archduke, a piece of a gold bracelet of the Archduchess, which had been given to him as a souvenir, in recognition of his brave conduct in those minutes; for with great skill he had dodged the first bombs that were hurled at the car, and now he was still convinced that his car could have hijacked the area of the shots had not the order come from inside the car from the Archduchess: 'Go on!'"

Time magazine described Lojka in an obituary as "famed as the chauffeur who drove the automobile which carried Archduke Francis Ferdinand at Sarajevo to his assassination".

== Literature ==
- Jiří Skoupý: Šofér, který změnil dějiny [The chauffeur who changed history], 2017, Mladá fronta, ISBN 9788020445124
