= Siegfried Taub =

German Jewish politician

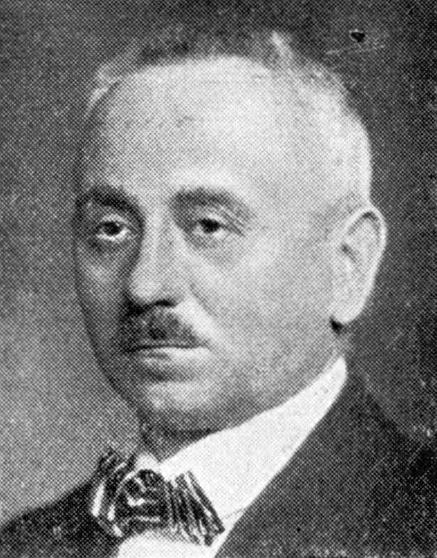
Siegfried Taub (1876-1946)

Siegfried Taub (1876, Telč, Margraviate of Moravia – 1946) was a Sudeten German Jewish politician from Czechoslovakia.

== Career ==
Taub was the general secretary of German Social Democratic Workers Party in the Czechoslovak Republic (DSAP) from 1924. He belonged to the Moravian triumvirate, with party chairman Ludwig Czech and newspaper editor Wilhelm Niessner, that came to dominate the party leadership from the mid-1920s. Taub served as deputy speaker of the Czechoslovak parliament.

Taub represented DSAP in the Executive of the Labour and Socialist International between February 1930 and 1938. He was a secretary by profession. According to data from 1935, he lived in Prague.

During the beginning of the Second World War, Taub was in exile in Sweden. In 1941, he moved to the United States. Taub left behind the archives of the Sudeten German social democrats, which were later recovered and donated to the Swedish Labor Movement Archive and Library.
