= Association of Free Trade Unions of Poland =

The Association of Free Trade Unions of Poland (Polish: Zrzeszenie Wolnych Związków Zawodowych w Polsce, abbreviated ZWZZ), initially named the Free Trade Unions (Polish: Wolne Związki Zawodowe, abbreviated WZZ), was a trade union centre in Poland. The organization had 8-10 affiliated unions and at its peak it was estimated to have 13,200 members.

The union was founded by the Independent Socialist Labour Party (NSPP) in late 1925, as a rival labour centre visavi the Polish Socialist Party and the KCZZ. WZZ had its headquarters in Katowice. The organization did not join ZSZ.

As of 1927 WZZ had some 7,200 members. The organization published Wolny Związkowiec ('Free Trade Unionist') as its organ.

WZZ took the name ZWZZ in 1927. ZWZZ was soon taken over by the Communist Party of Poland.

ZWZZ was disbanded in October 1930 by order from the Police Directorate of the Silesian Voivodeship.
