= Panas Fedenko =

Ukrainian politician, historian, and revolutionary (1893–1981)

- Панас Феденко

Member of the Central Rada
- In office 1917 – 29 April 1918
- Succeeded by: Position abolished

Personal details
- Born: 13 December 1893 Veseli Terny, Russian Empire (now Ukraine)
- Died: 10 September 1981 (aged 87) Munich, Bavaria, West Germany
- Party: Ukrainian Social Democratic Labour Party

Military service
- Allegiance: Ukrainian People's Republic
- Years of service: 1919–1920
- Battles/wars: Ukrainian–Soviet War; First Winter Campaign

Panas (Note: Also rendered as Opanas.) Vasyliovych Fedenko (Ukrainian: Панас Васильович Феденко; 13 December [O.S. 1 December] 1893 – 10 September 1981) was a Ukrainian socialist politician, historian, and revolutionary. He was a member of the Ukrainian Central Rada from 1917 to 1918 and led the Ukrainian Social Democratic Labour Party in-exile (as the Ukrainian Socialist Party) as its general secretary from 1950 to 1967.

== Early life and career ==
Fedenko was born into a peasant family of eight children, near the village of Veseli Terny (then part of Verkhnedneprovsk uezd, Katerynoslav Governorate, Russian Empire), located today within Kryvyi Rih Raion, Dnipropetrovsk Oblast, Ukraine.

On the advice of a teacher, he was transferred to a grammar school in Oleksandriia before graduating in 1913 and enrolling in the Imperial Institute of History and Philology in Saint Petersburg in 1914. While in Saint Petersburg, he joined Ukrainian Social Democratic Labour Party in 1915, at the age of 22. He became the editor of the party's bi-weekly publication, Nashe zhyttia (Our Life), and contributed to Ukrainskaya zhizn (Ukrainian Life), a journal published by Symon Petliura, a fellow party member, in Moscow.

== Independent Ukraine ==
Panas returned to Ukraine after the February Revolution, which saw the overthrow of Tsar Nicholas II, the dissolution of the Russian Empire, and the formation of a Ukrainian self-governing body, the Central Rada. During this time, he established a Ukrainian-language grammar school in Veseli Terny where he taught English, literature, and history, and was later appointed "officer in charge of the political education and organization of the masses" by the Central Rada in his native Verkhnedneprovsk uezd, before being elected as a delegate to the Rada himself, a role he occupied up until the 1918 Ukrainian coup d'état by Pavlo Skoropadskyi.

Political work necessitated his relocation to the city of Dnipro (then known as Katerynoslav), where he edited and co-edited a number of Social Democratic Labour Party periodicals, including Nasha sprava (Our Cause) and Robitnycha hazeta (Workers' Gazette). While in Dnipro, he met and befriended fellow revolutionary Isaak Mazepa and taught at the Katerynoslav Teacher Training Institute.

In 1919, both Panas and Mazepa were elected as delegates to the All-Ukrainian Labor Congress, a legislative body formed in the aftermath of the Anti-Hetman Uprising and the re-establishment of the Ukrainian People's Republic.

Panas was appointed a political commissar of the Ukrainian Army the same year at the age of 25, participating in the First Winter Campaign against Bolshevik and South Russian forces in the Soviet–Ukrainian War. From July to December 1920, Panas carried out clandestine political activities on behalf of the Social Democratic Labour Party in Bolshevik-occupied regions of Ukraine before being forced to relocate to Lviv and eventually Poland as Bolshevik forces advanced further into Ukraine. Panas participated in the Ukrainian government in-exile as a representative of the Social Democratic Labour Party and began publishing journals such as Vilna Ukraina (Free Ukraine) and Sotsialistychna dumka (Socialist Thought).

== Life in exile ==
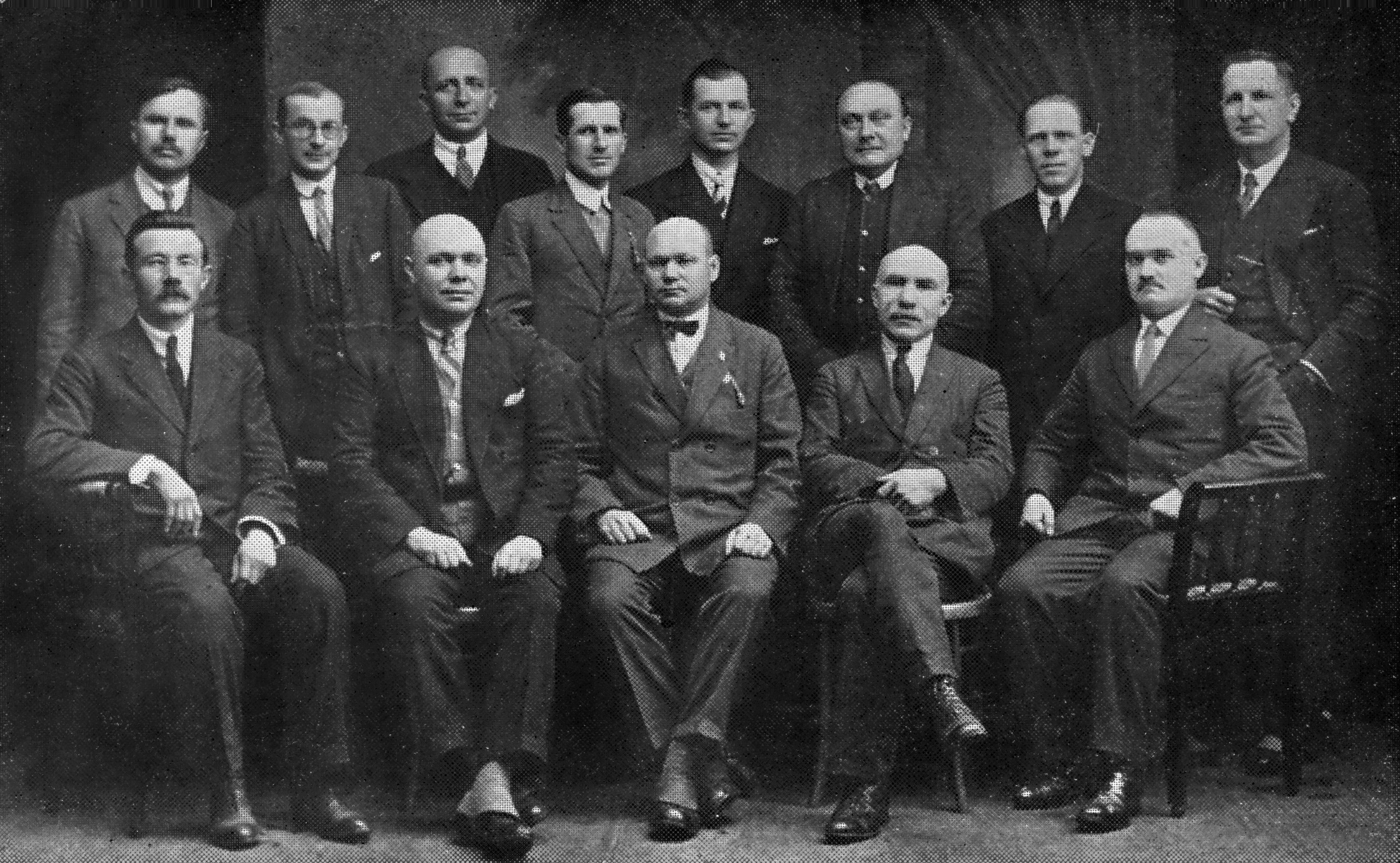
Members of the Congress of the Ukrainian Social Democratic Labour Party, held in Poděbrady, Czechoslovakia in 1926. Panas Fedenko standing first from the left.

Toegether with Mazepa, Panas emigrated to Berlin, Weimar Republic in 1922, where he published Natsionalna i sotsiialna borotba ukrainskoho narodu (The National and Social Struggle of the Ukrainian People), before emigrating once again to Prague, Czechoslovakia, where he would live from 1923 to 1945. In 1923, he successfully defended his doctoral dissertation at the Prague Free University, and began teaching at the Mykhailo Drahomanov Ukrainian High Pedagogical Institute from 1925, becoming a department chair and dean of history. Panas established the Service de Presse Ukrainien in 1931. In 1932, he became an associate professor at the Ukrainian Free University and later a reader in 1935. Panas also taught history and Latin at the Ukrainian Gymnasium in Czechoslovakia, presented papers at meetings of the Ukrainian Historical and Philological Society, wrote articles for the Ukrainian General Encyclopaedia published in Lviv (then known as Lwów under Polish rule), and was a member of the Union of Ukrainian Journalists and Writers Abroad.

While in exile, Panas was a member of the Labour and Socialist International's executive community as a representative of the Social Democratic Labour Party.

With the advance of Soviet forces into Prague in 1945, Panas left German-occupied Czechoslovakia for Germany proper, re-settling in the city of Augsburg after the war.

In 1948, he represented the Social Democratic Labour Party at the inaugural session of the Ukrainian National Council (not to be confused with the Nazi-collaborationist Ukrainian National Committee).

In 1950, he became general secretary of the Ukrainian Socialist Party, the result of a merger between Panas' Social Democratic Labour Party, the Ukrainian Radical Party, and Ukrainian Socialist-Revolutionary Party.

In 1951, Panas moved to London, United Kingdom, and began publishing Nashe Slovo (Our World), a socialist-leaning periodical from 1952 to 1958, and started a publication company of the same name. During this period, he also contributed to the Institute for the Study of the USSR, located in Munich, and represented the Ukrainian Socialist Party in the National Council as well as the newly-formed Socialist International.

Panas moved to Munich, West Germany, in 1959, bringing with him the Nashe Slovo periodical and publication company. In 1973, he began lecturing on Ukrainian history at the Ukrainian Free University in Munich as a visiting professor and as a full professor from 1977 to 1980.

He died in 1981 and is buried in Paris, France.

== Bibliography ==
- Fedenko, P. Marxist and Bolshevist theories on national matters. "Institute for the Study of the USSR". Munich 1960.
- Fedenko, P. Isaak Mazepa is a fighter for freedom of Ukraine. "Nashe Slovo" Publishing. London 1954.
