= Dino Rondani =

Italian socialist politician, lawyer and parliamentarian (1868–1951)

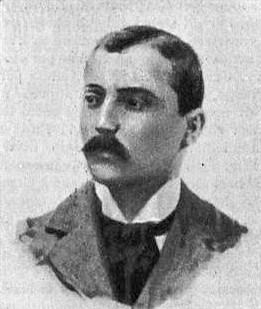
Dino Rondani (1900)

Dino Rondani (1868 in Sogliano al Rubicone – 1951 in Nice) was an Italian socialist politician, lawyer and parliamentarian. He was also the National Secretary of the Cooperative League. He was a member of parliament representing Cossato until 1914.

In 1898, he was sentenced to jail for his role in Fatti di Maggio. He was given an amnesty, and In 1899 he was appointed by the Italian Socialist Party to move to the United States and serve as the editor of Il Proletario (an Italian-language socialist publication) there. Rondani had written ten articles for Il Proletario since 1898. When he arrived, he stepped right into a conflictive situation amongst the Italian-American socialists (largely caused by differences of opinion regarding Daniel DeLeon's leadership of the Socialist Labor Party). Rondani tried to reconcile revolutionary and reformist sectors of Italian-American socialists.

However he was called back to Italy soon after his arrival in America, returning in 1900, as he was nominated as a candidate in parliamentary elections.

In late 1902, he again visited the Americas, on a speaking tour in Argentina and the United States. In Argentina, local socialists organized various propaganda events with him as a speaker. They also organized debates with anarchists. In the U.S., Rondani visited Patterson.

He represented Novara in the Italian parliament between 1919 and 1921.

Rondani represented the Socialist Party of Argentina in the Bureau of the Labour and Socialist International between 1934 and 1940.

== See also ==
- Politics of Italy
