= Boris Gorev =

Russian revolutionary (1874–1937)

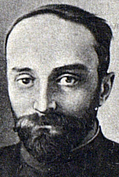
Boris Gorev

Boris Isaakovich Gorev (4 December 1874, Vilno – 27 December 1937) was a revolutionary and writer who was active in both he Bolshevik and Menshevik wings of the Russian Social Democratic and Labour Party.

He was the son of Isaak Meerovich Goldman. His younger brother Mikhail Goldman (aka Mark Liber) was a founding member of the General Jewish Labour Bund ("the Bund"). His sister Julia Goldman married Felix Dzerzhinsky, but she died of tuberculosis in 1904.

He was arrested in 1937 during the great purge, and was then shot.

== Works ==
- Materialism: Philosophy of the Proletariat 1920 Moscow. A Chinese translation by Qu Qiubai was published which Mao Tse-tung read.
