= Bernardo B. Delom =

Bernardo Berenger Delom was an Argentine socialist politician and organizer of cooperative movements. He was born on August 19, 1884. He was an electrician by profession. He served as treasurer of the Socialist Party, and he represented the party in the Executive Committee of the Labour and Socialist International between August 1928 and February 1934.

He eventually moved away from party politics, and became a leading figure in the cooperative movement. He served as chairman of the Argentine Federation of Consumer Co-operatives. He represented the Argentine cooperative movement in the International Cooperative Alliance. He was a board member of El Hogar Obrero cooperative. He published the journal El cooperativismo, and authored El cooperativismo en la escuela ('Cooperativism in the School') and El ABC del empleado cooperativo ('The ABC for the Cooperative Employee').

At the 1953 General Assembly of the organization Delom and other non-Peronist officials of the Argentine Federation of Consumer Co-operatives were removed from their posts. Delom went into exile. He died on July 15, 1956.

The Bernardo Delom Popular Library was founded on July 15, 1958. In 1959 the City of Buenos Aires named a square in Villa Lugano after Delom (34.670080°S 58.479030°W).
