= Telč =

- Town
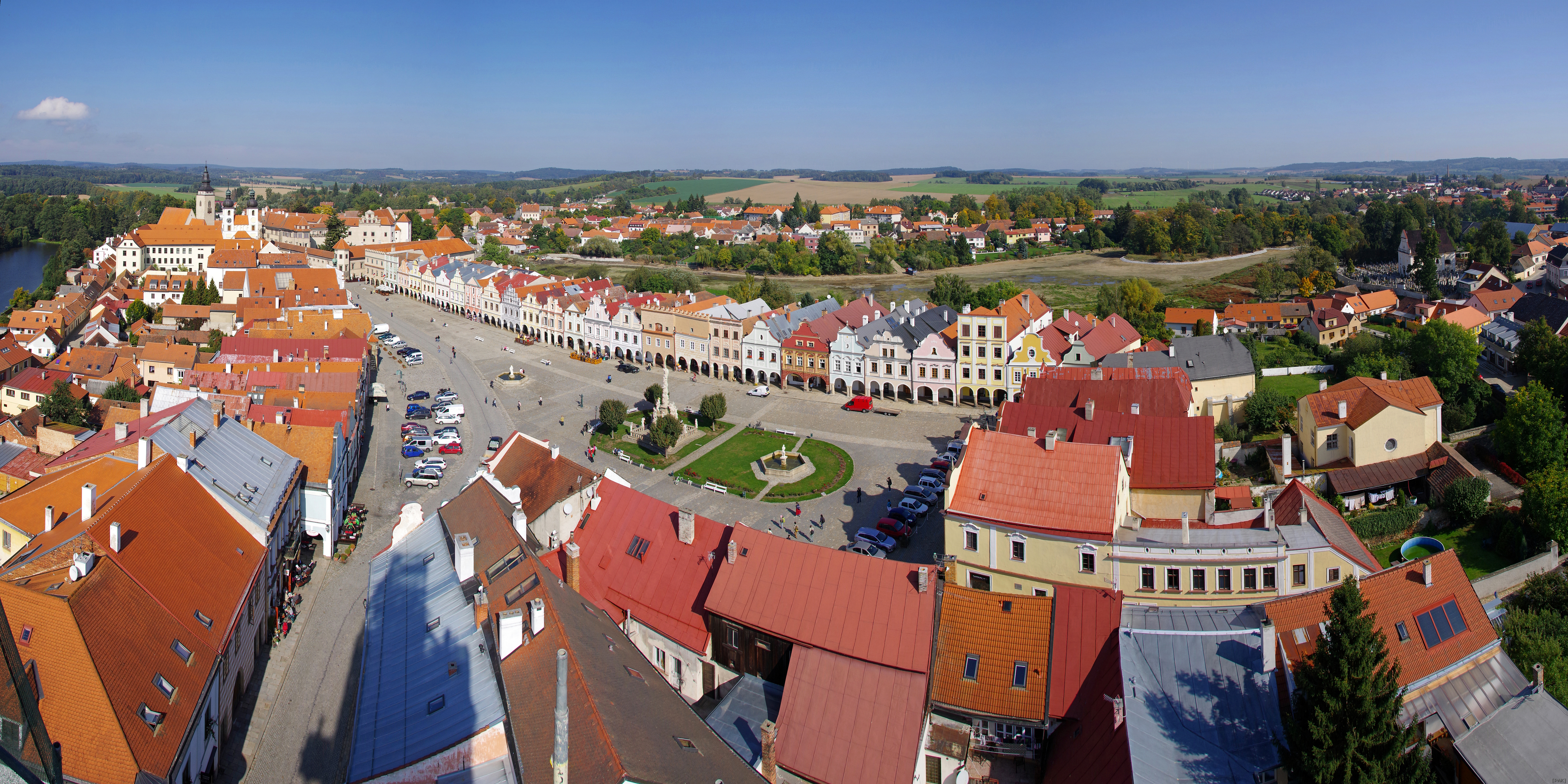
- Historic centre of Telč

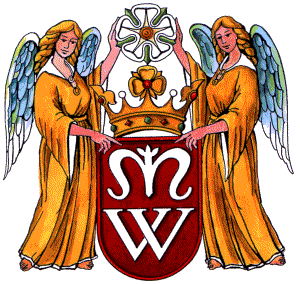
- Flag Coat of arms

- Location in the Czech Republic
- Coordinates: 49°11′3″N 15°27′10″E
- Country: Czech Republic
- Region: Vysočina
- District: Jihlava
- First mentioned: 1335

Government
  - Mayor: Vladimír Brtník

Area
  - Total: 24.87 km^{2} (9.60 sq mi)
- Elevation: 514 m (1,686 ft)

Population (2026-01-01)
  - Total: 5,105
  - Density: 205.3/km^{2} (531.6/sq mi)
- Time zone: UTC+1 (CET)
  - Summer (DST): UTC+2 (CEST)
- Postal code: 588 56
- Website: www.telc.eu

UNESCO World Heritage Site
- Official name: Historic Centre of Telč
- Criteria: Cultural: (i), (iv)
- Reference: 621
- Inscription: 1992 (16th Session)
- Area: 36 ha (0.14 sq mi)
- Buffer zone: 296.5 ha (1.145 sq mi)

Telč (Czech pronunciation: [tɛltʃ]; German: Teltsch) is a town in Jihlava District in the Vysočina Region of the Czech Republic. It has about 5,100 inhabitants. The town is located in a hilly landscape in the Křižanov Highlands and is surrounded by a system of fishponds.

The town's economy depends on tourism. Telč is known for its historic centre, which is protected as an urban monument reservation and is a UNESCO World Heritage Site. Among the main landmarks of the town is the Renaissance castle, protected as a national cultural monument.

== Administrative division ==
Telč consists of five municipal parts (in brackets population according to the 2021 census):

- Telč-Podolí (970)
- Telč-Staré Město (2,429)
- Telč-Štěpnice (1,414)
- Telč-Vnitřní Město (260)
- Studnice (78)

Studnice forms an exclave of the municipal territory.

== Etymology ==
The settlement was originally named Teleč. The name was created by adding the possessive suffix to the personal name Telec (meaning 'young calf') and was masculine. The current name Telč is feminine.

== Geography ==
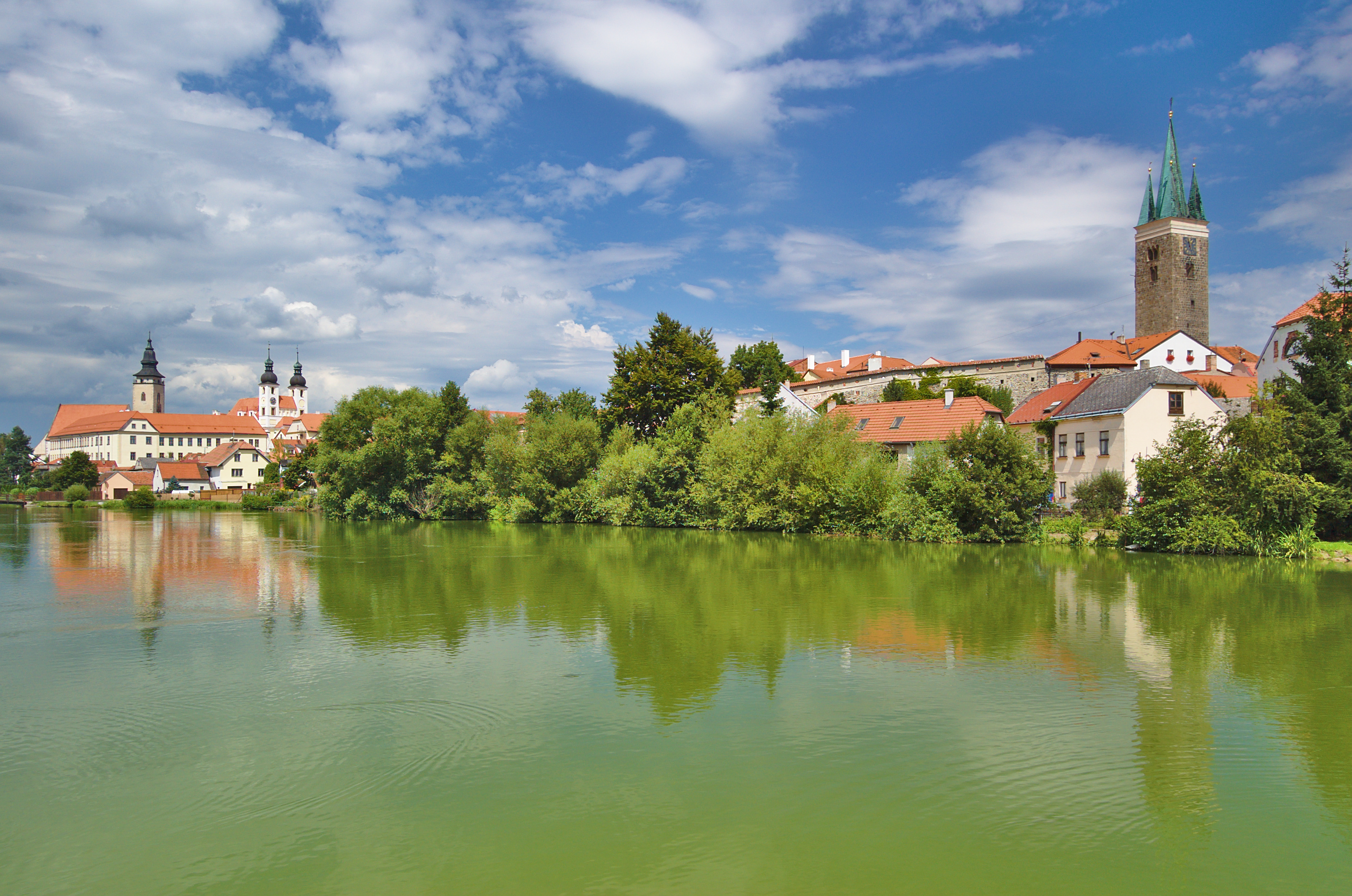
View of Telč across the Ulický rybník

Telč is located about 26 kilometres (16 mi) southwest of Jihlava. It lies in the Křižanov Highlands. The highest point is the hill Studnická Ostražka at 642 m (2,106 ft) above sea level, located near Studnice.

The stream Telčský potok flows through the town and contributes the Moravian Thaya River in the south. The Moravian Thaya partly forms the eastern border of the municipal territory. The territory of Telč is rich in fishponds. The system of ponds Štěpnický rybník, Ulický rybník and Staroměstský rybník is located in the centre of the town.

== History ==
According to local legend, the town was founded in 1099; however, the first written mention is from 1335. The Gothic castle, Gothic houses and water fortification were built in the mid-14th century. The development ended during the Hussite Wars. The town was conquered by the Hussites but the castle resisted.

Telč slowly recovered and another period of prosperity occurred during the rule of Zachariáš of Hradec. In the middle of the 16th century, he had the medieval castle rebuilt in the Renaissance style. He also had the Gothic houses rebuilt into Renaissance houses with arcades and decorated façades. During the Thirty Years' War, the town was shortly occupied by the Swedish army. The counter-reformation brought the Jesuits to the town, who built the Church of the Name of Jesus in 1667, and founded the Jesuit Latin Grammar School.

During the 18th century, the town profited from wealthy townspeople who had statues, fountains, chapels and Marian column built. In 1773, the rights of the Jesuit Order were cancelled. From 1785, Telč was Germanised. During the 19th century, the industry developed. The railway was built in 1898.

== Demographics ==
Historical population

Year	Pop.	±%
1869	4,733	—
1880	5,272	+11.4%
1890	5,079	−3.7%
1900	4,785	−5.8%
1910	4,647	−2.9%

Year	Pop.	±%
1921	4,533	−2.5%
1930	4,420	−2.5%
1950	4,288	−3.0%
1961	5,146	+20.0%
1970	5,367	+4.3%

Year	Pop.	±%
1980	5,875	+9.5%
1991	6,049	+3.0%
2001	6,053	+0.1%
2011	5,540	−8.5%
2021	5,151	−7.0%

Source: Censuses

== Economy ==
The town's economy depends on tourism. Telč is one of the most frequent destinations for foreign tourists in the Czech Republic.

== Transport ==
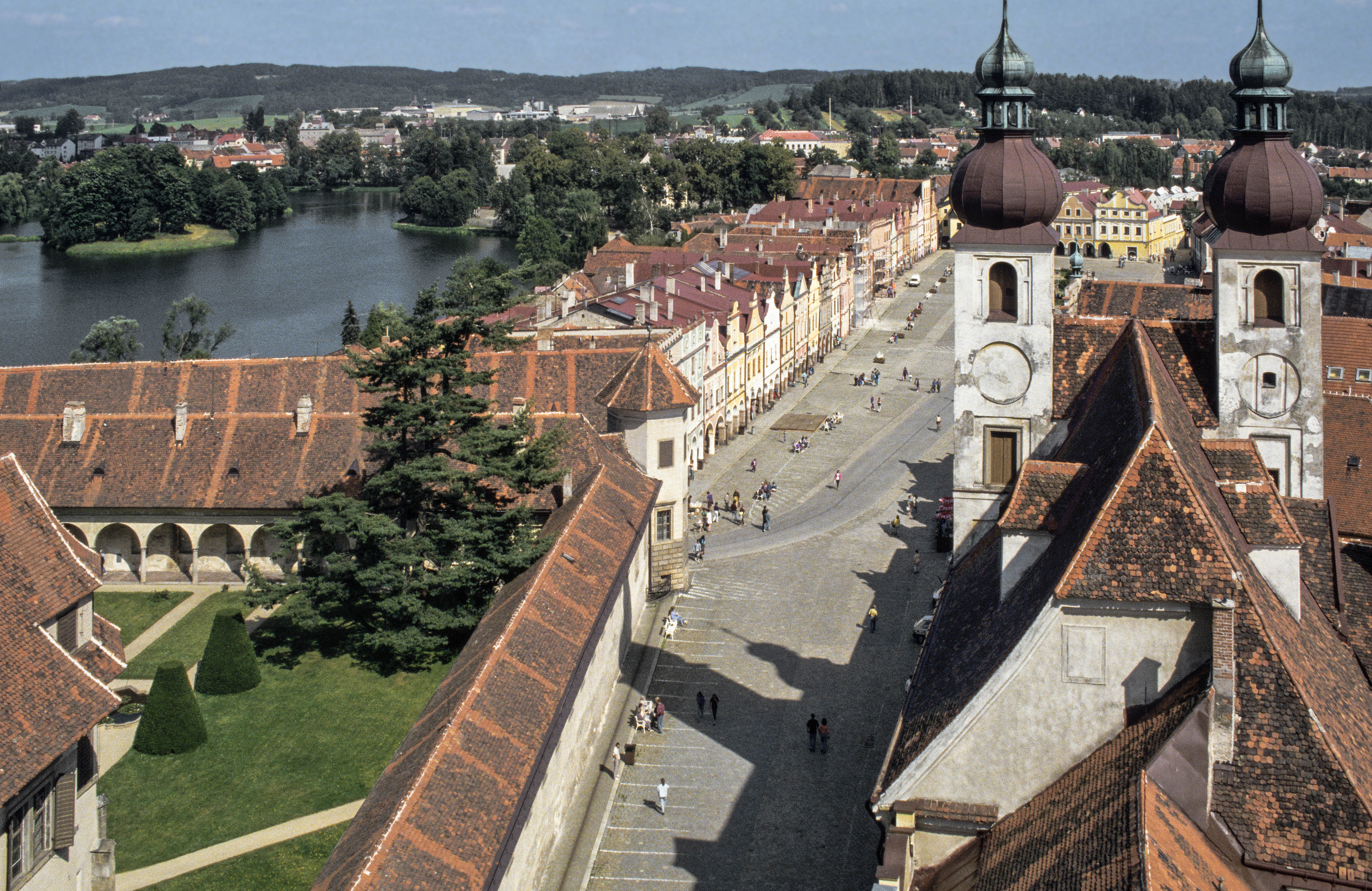
General view

The I/23 road from Třebíč to Jindřichův Hradec runs through the town.

Telč is located on the railway line Havlíčkův Brod–Slavonice. The town is served by two train stations: Telč and Telč-Staré Město.

== Sights ==
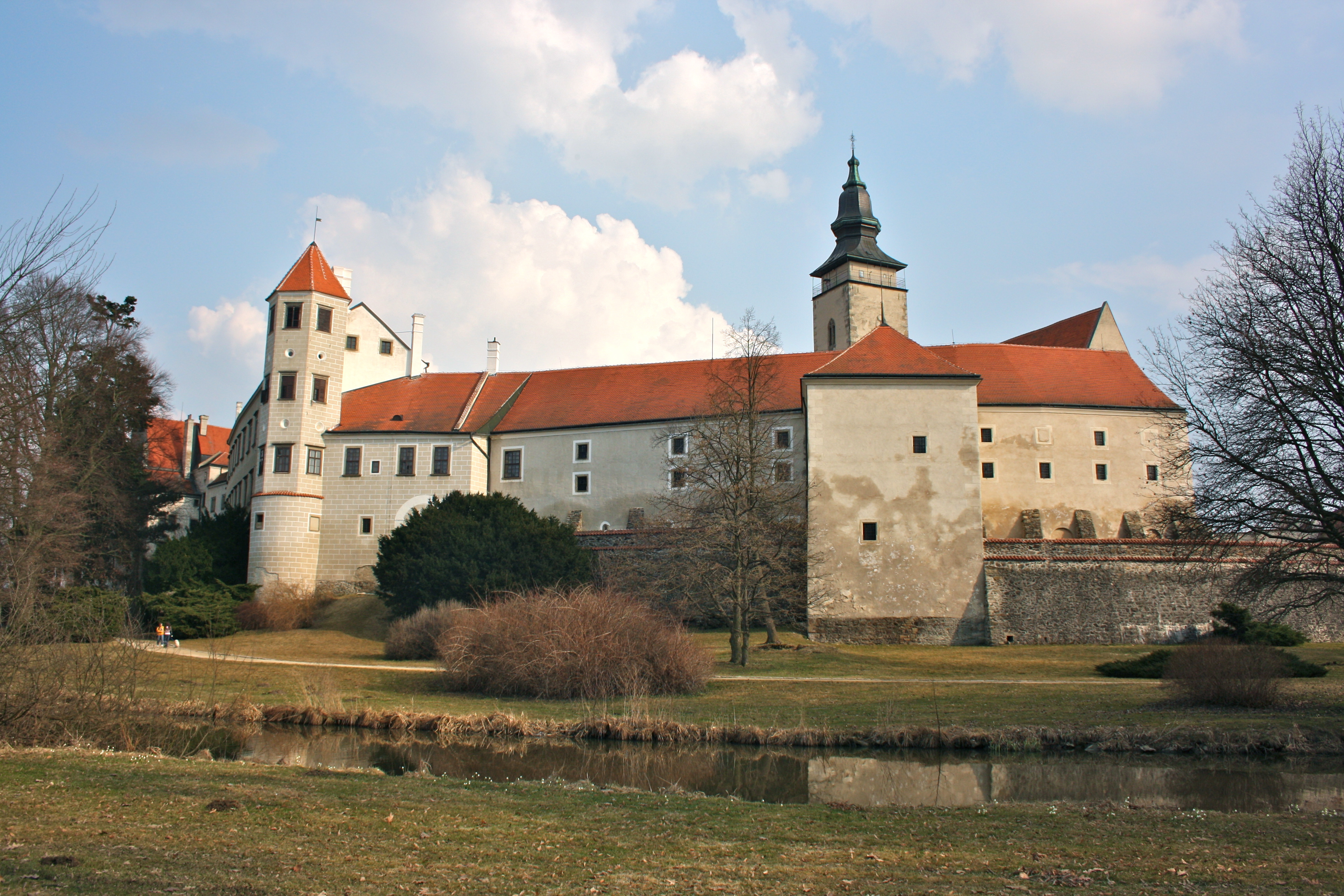
Telč Castle

The historic town centre is located between the ponds Štěpnický rybník and Ulický rybník and also delimited by town walls. The historic centre is protected as an urban monument reservation and the town part of Telč-Staré Město is an urban monument zone. Since 1992, Telč has been a UNESCO World Heritage Site.

The town square is a unique complex of long urban plaza with well-conserved Renaissance and Baroque houses with high gables and arcades. The houses have been uniformly reconstructed in the Renaissance styles and later gables and façades of some of them were individually remodelled, in most cases in the Baroque style.

The 17th-century Renaissance castle with an English-style park is one of the main landmarks of the square and whole town. One of the most valuable parts is the Chapel of All Saints with stucco decoration. There are several exhibition routes and the castle also houses a branch of the Vysočina Museum with ethnographic, historical and archaeological collections. The castle with the park is protected as a national cultural monument.

=== Religious monuments ===
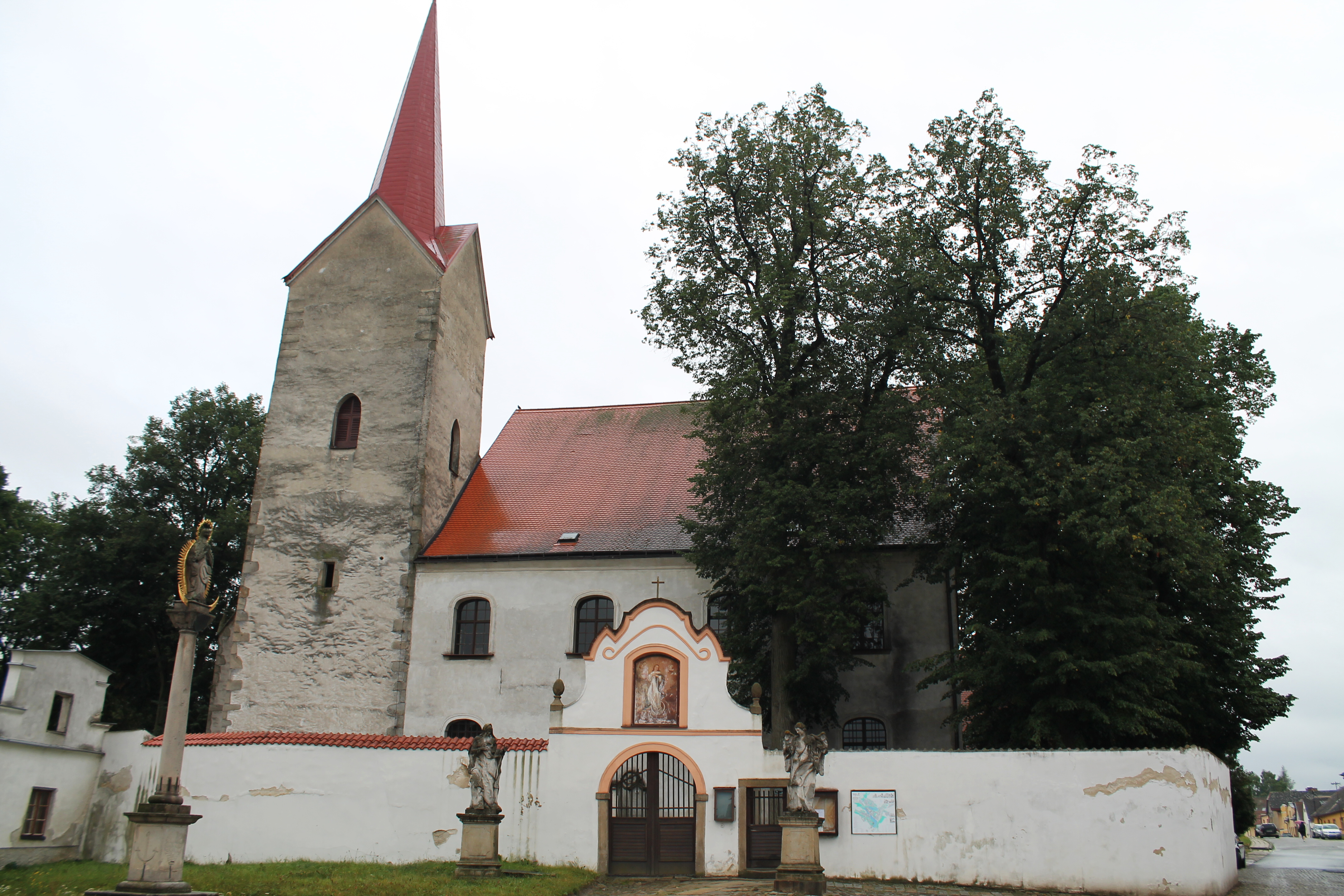
Church of the Holy Mother of God

The main landmark of Telč-Staré Město is the Church of the Holy Mother of God. Originally a Gothic church from the second half of the 14th century, this cemetery church is the oldest church in Telč. It was rebuilt in the early Baroque style in the 17th century. The enclosure wall with gate and Baroque statues around the church date from the 18th century. Inside the church is a preserved late Gothic pulpit.

The Church of the Holy Spirit was built in the late Gothic style on the site of an older sanctuary. The church was built as an extension to a late Romanesque tower from the early 13th century. The tower was damaged by fire, after which it was lowered and given a pseudo-Gothic roof.

The Church of the Name of Jesus is a significant landmark of the town square. It is built right in a row of houses as a part of the former Jesuit college. it was built in the Baroque style in 1663–1667, according to the design by Giovanni Domenico Orsi.

The Church of Saint James the Great is a large Gothic building that is an extension of Telč Castle. It has a massive tower that is almost 60 m (200 ft) high.

The second cemetery church in Telč is the Church of Saint Anne. It was built in the early Baroque style at the end of the 17th century.

== In popular culture ==
In 1963, Vojtěch Jasný made the film The Cassandra Cat in Telč. In 1979, Werner Herzog filmed the movie Woyzeck in Telč.

Many Czech fairy tale movies were filmed in the Telč Castle, the most famous of which are The Proud Princess (1952) and Z pekla štěstí (1999).

== Notable people ==
- Siegfried Taub (1876–1946), Jewish politician
- Leopold Lojka (1886–1926), Archduke Franz Ferdinand's chauffeur
- Theodor Schaefer (1904–1969), composer and pedagogue

== Twin towns – sister cities ==
Telč is twinned with:

- Belp, Switzerland
- Figeac, France
- Rothenburg ob der Tauber, Germany
- Šaľa, Slovakia
- Waidhofen an der Thaya, Austria
- Wilber, United States

== Gallery ==
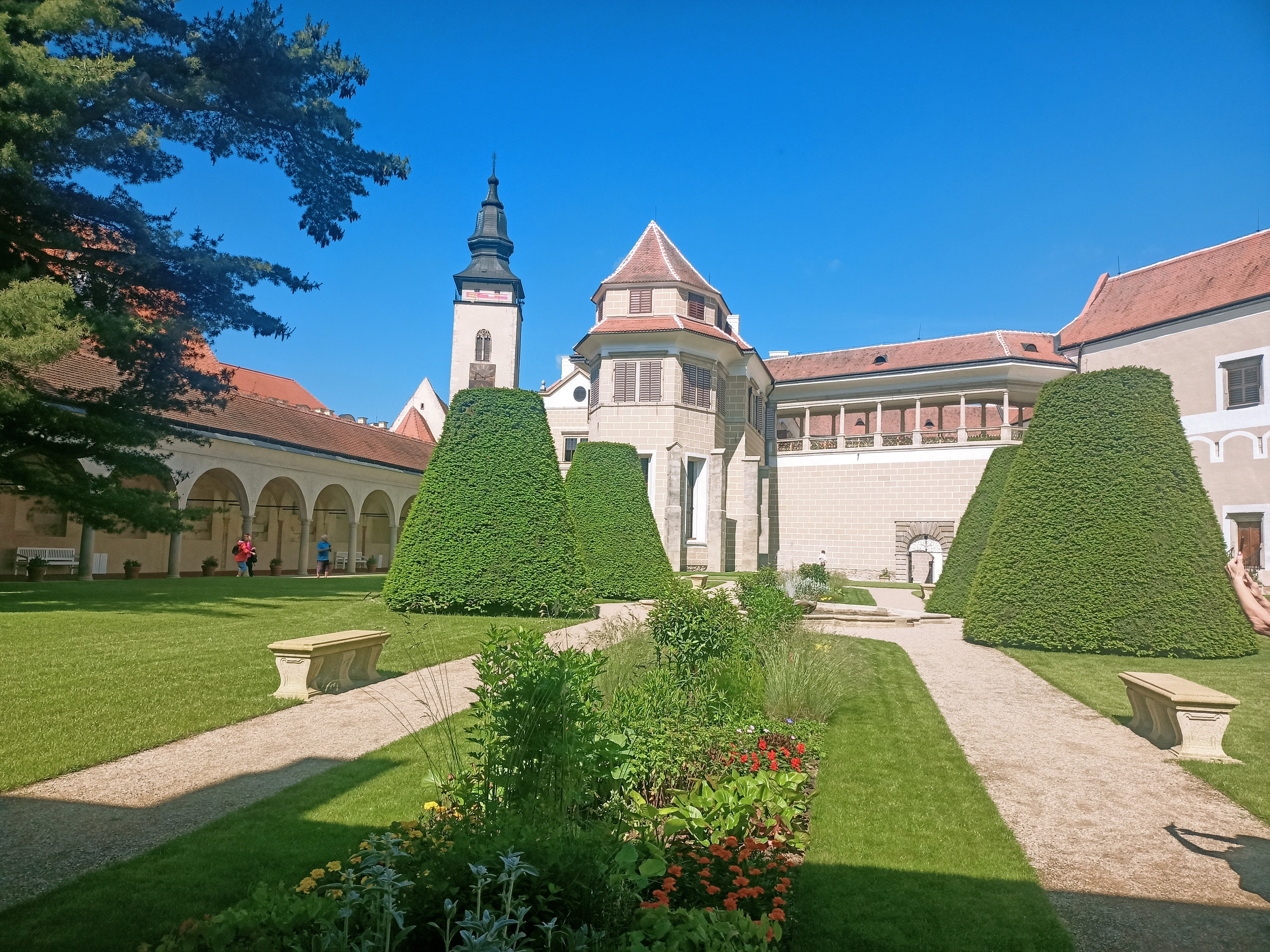
Garden of the Telč Castle

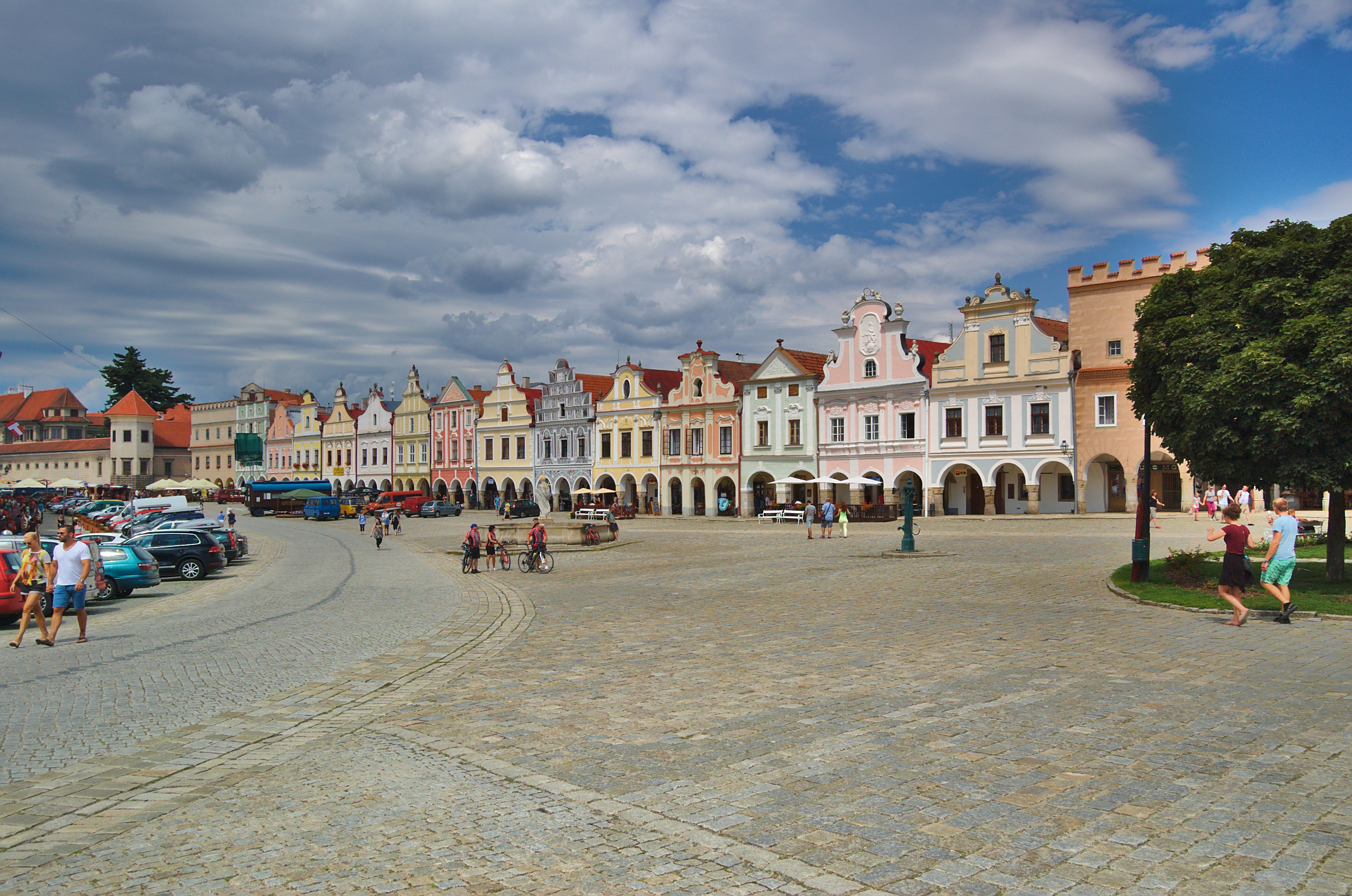
Náměstí Zachariáše z Hradce

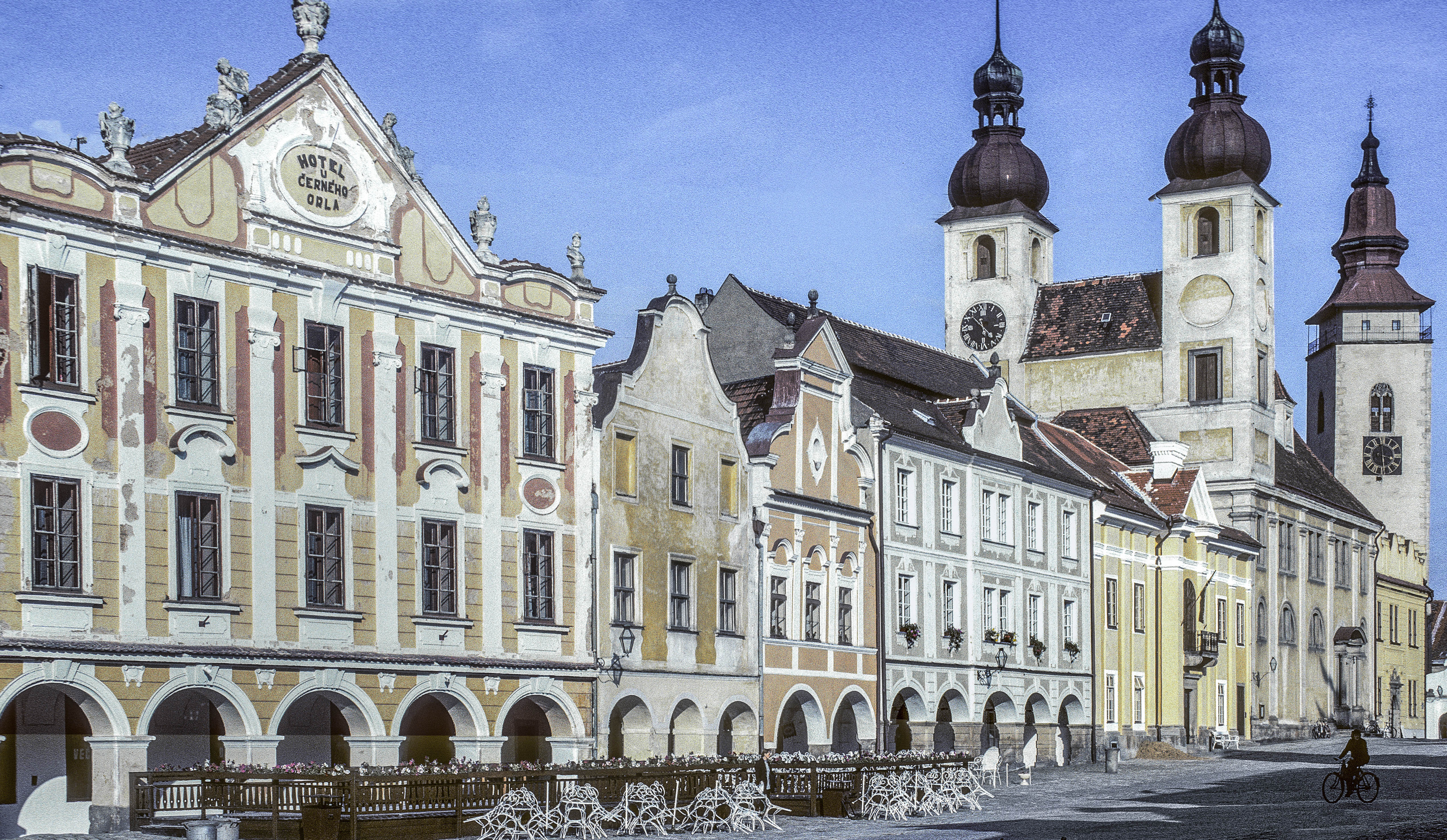
Houses and Church of the Name of Jesus on the town square

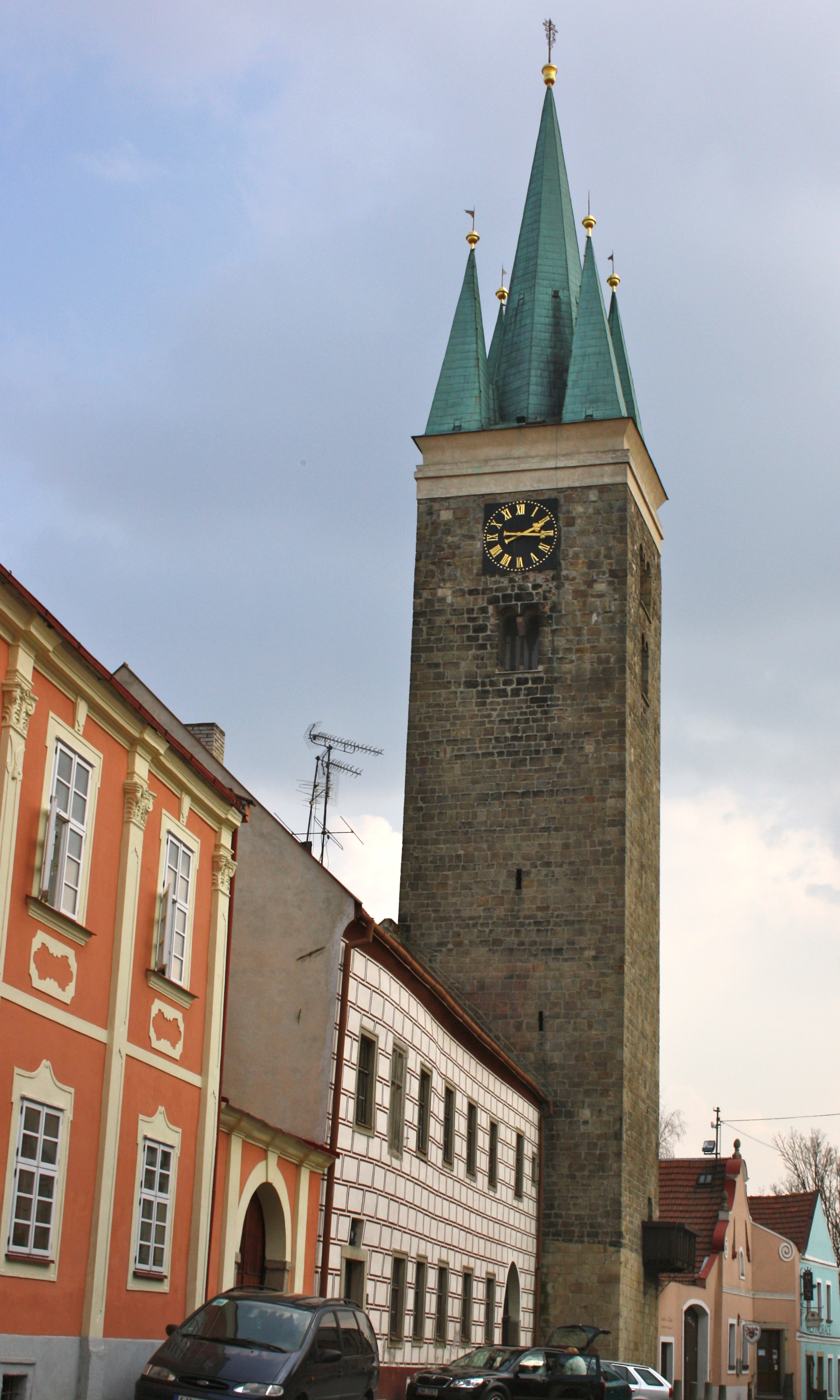
Church of the Holy Spirit
