= Joseph Kruk =

Joseph Kruk (Hebrew: יוסף קרוק; December 5, 1885, in Częstochowa – July 6, 1972, in Jerusalem) was a socialist and Jewish-nationalist activist from his youth in Russia and Poland, where he played a political role between-the-wars. In 1940 he saved his life moving from Poland to Eretz Israel. Utill his death he was known in Israel as a journalist.

Kruk took part in founding the first labour Zionist grouping in his hometown Częstochowa prior to the Russian Revolution of 1905. When the revolution broke out, he was a major leader of the territorialist Zionist Socialist Workers Party in the city.

In 1906 he went into exile, and traveled over Europe. He studied Law at the University of Bern, obtaining a doctoral degree. During the First World War he and his wife, Roza Kruk, lived in London.

Kruk, after a short episode in post revolution Russia, returned to Poland in 1918 and settled down in Warsaw. He became a leader of the Fareynikte party (into which the Zionist-Socialists had merged). In 1922 Kruk and the Fareynikte merged into the Independent Socialist Labour Party.

By 1927 the Independent Socialist Labour Party was in crisis. The question on cooperation with the communists divided the party. The party was split in two, one group led by Bolesław Drobner and another led by Kruk. Drobner's group merged into the Polish Socialist Party in 1928, whilst Kruk's group continued operate as the Independent Socialist Labour Party. After the split, Kruk took over Drobner's seat as one of the Polish representatives in the executive of the Labour and Socialist International. Kruk was a member of the executive between June 1928 and October 1930, sharing the seat with the Yugoslav socialist leader Živko Topalović (like Drobner had done as well).

In 1937 Kruk and his Warsaw-based group merged into the Poalei Zion Right. However, even after having joined the Zionist mainstream Kruk retained links with the territorialist Freyland League. He wrote for the Yiddish newspaper Haynt.

In 1940 Kruk migrated to Palestine. In Israel he wrote for the newspapers Davar and Letse Nayes ("Last News"). He died in 1972 and is buried at Har HaMenuchot.
