= Socialist Workers and Peasants Party of Latvia =

Political party in Latvia (1934–1940)

Socialist Workers and Peasants Party of Latvia Latvijas Sociālistiskā strādnieku un zemnieku partija
- Abbreviation: LSSZP
- Leader: Ansis Rudevics
- Founded: 1934
- Dissolved: 3 July 1940
- Preceded by: Latvian Social Democratic Workers' Party
- Youth wing: Workers' Youth League of Latvia
- Ideology: Socialism

The Socialist Workers and Peasants Party of Latvia (Latvian: Latvijas Sociālistiskā strādnieku un zemnieku partija, abbr. LSSZP) was a political party in Latvia. It was an illegal underground party, established in 1934 by the left-wing faction of the Latvian Social Democratic Workers' Party (LSDSP) after the coup of Kārlis Ulmanis. The party was led by former LSDSP chairman Ansis Rudevics.

== History ==
The LSSZP was formed clandestinely in 1934 by former members of the left-wing faction of the LSDSP. That year, prime minister Kārlis Ulmanis had couped himself, creating a dictatorship and banning all political parties. Ansis Rudevics, who was the chairman of the pre-split LSDSP, led the LSSZP.

The LSSZP was closely aligned with the Communist Party of Latvia. In November 1934, the two parties signed an agreement of unity in action against fascism. The youth organizations of the two parties merged into the Workers' Youth League of Latvia in 1936. An anti-fascist popular front was formed in 1939, with the LSSZP, the Communist Party, and the Workers' Youth League as its main constituents.

In August 1934, the LSSZP formed a special committee to lead the underground Jewish socialist movement, and Latvian Bund activists participated in this committee. The first LZZSP congress, held in July 1935, recognized the Bund as an autonomous organization under the same terms as the Bund had previously aligned with the LSDSP. The Bund activists were arrested in November 1936.

The party disbanded on 3 July 1940, after the Soviet Union began its occupation of Latvia. The Communist Party henceforce became the sole legal party in the Latvian Soviet Socialist Republic, until the dissolution of the Soviet Union and restoration of Latvia's independence in 1991.
