= Independent Socialist Labour Party =

The Independent Socialist Labour Party (Polish: Niezależna Socjalistyczna Partia Pracy) was a political party in Poland. The party was founded on March 12, 1922, in Kraków. Initially the party bore the name Party of Independent Socialists (Partia Niezależnych Socjalistów). Bolesław Drobner was the chairman of the party. The party became affiliated with the Vienna International.

The party demanded nationalizations of key industries, equality for national minorities and development of bilateral links with the Soviet Union.

In the summer of 1922, the Fareynikte merged into party. At the time of the merger, the Fareynikte had conditioned their entry into the party demanding that separate national minority sections (for Jews, Germans, Ukrainians, etc..) to be formed within the party. That re-organization never materialized, though.

From 1923 onwards, the party was affiliated with the Labour and Socialist International (into which the Vienna International had merged). On September 21, 1924, a Polish Socialist Party-splinter group, the Socialist League "Praca", merged into the party.

As of 1925 the party had around 2,500 members. Głos Niezależnych Socjalistów was the central organ of the party.

During the period 1924-1926 the party was involved in confrontations with the Polish Socialist Party over influence inside the trade union movement. In mid-1925 the party founded the Association of Free Trade Unions of Poland (ZWZZP). ZWZZP was soon taken over by communists.

By 1927 the party was in crisis. The question on cooperation with the communists divided the party. The party was split in two, one group led by Drobner and another led by Joseph Kruk. Drobner's group merged into the Polish Socialist Party in 1928, whilst Kruk's group continued to function as a party of its own.

The party obtained 0.2% of the national vote in the 1928 Sejm election.

The party withdrew from the Labour and Socialist International in 1933. The party joined the London Bureau. During the 1930s the party worked in a united front together with the communists. The party was banned in 1937. At this point, Kruk and his Warsaw-based group merged into the Poalei Zion Right.
