= Czechoslovak Social Democratic Workers Party in the Republic of Austria =

Czechoslovak Social Democratic Workers Party in the Republic of Austria Československá sociálně demokratická strana dělnická v republice Rakoúské
- Chairman: Lesak (1925), W. Filar (1928), Čeněk Sahanek (1931)
- Founded: December 7, 1919
- Banned: February 1934
- Headquarters: Margaretenplatz 7, Vienna V
- Newspaper: Vídeňské dělnické listy
- Membership (1928): 14,200
- Ideology: Social democracy
- National affiliation: Social Democratic Workers' Party of Austria
- International affiliation: Labour and Socialist International

The Czechoslovak Social Democratic Workers Party in the Republic of Austria (Czech: Československá sociálně demokratická strana dělnická v republice Rakoúské) was a political party in Austria, working amongst the Czech minority. The party was founded on 7 December 1919, when the Vienna branch of the Czechoslovak Social Democratic Party separated from the mother party following Czechoslovakia's declaration of independence a year earlier. The party worked closely together with the Social Democratic Workers Party of Austria (SDAPÖ), and contested parliamentary elections on joint lists together with SDAPÖ.

== History ==
The first, and constituent, party congress was held in 1921. The congress adopted a party programme, which included demands such as the right to education in mother language, the unification of the Vienna urban and rural areas into a single electoral constituency, judicial reform, lowering the voting age to 18 years, full press freedom and direct popular intervention in the legislative. Most of the social demands of the party were similar to those raised by SDAPÖ.

In May 1927 the party congress adopted a new party programme, following the lines of the SDAPÖ Linz Programme.

The party was banned in February 1934. The party then began to operate as an underground organization. Publications were printed in neighbouring Czechoslovakia, and smuggled into Austria.

== Organization ==
The party was organized on the principle of individual membership. As of 1928, the party claimed a membership of around 14,200, out of whom 3,700 were women. The highest organ of the party was the party congress, held every two years. The congress elected a Party Presidium and Secretariat. The activists of the party were active in the Austrian trade union movement. The youth wing of the party had, as of 1928, 2,825 members. In close connection to the party was the educational association, Máj, the Workers Gymnastics Union (DTJ) and cycling clubs. There was also a Czech section of the Republikanischer Schutzbund, connected to the party.

The party had offices almost all of the districts of the country. These offices also served as offices for the district branches of the youth and women's wings of the party.

== Leadership ==
As of 1925, Lesak was Chairman of the Party Presidium. In 1928 he had been replaced by W. Filar and in 1931 by Čeněk Sahanek. Other prominent leaders of the party included the parliamentarian František Dvořák, Antonín Machát (municipal councillor on behalf of the Czech minority in Vienna during the Second World War), František Strnad, Bedřich Čepelka and Josef Petrů.

As of 1928, the Party Presidium consisted of Filar (chairman), Drahozal, Kopecká, Skranc, Zedniček, Čižek, Strnad, Skřivan (secretary), Adámek, Hajn, Pechowá and Kohl.

== Press ==
The central organ of the party was Vídeňské dělnické listy ('Viennoise Workers' Paper').

== International affiliation ==
The party was affiliated to the Labour and Socialist International between 1923 and 1940. Alois Wawrousek represented the party in the Executive of the Labour and Socialist International between August 1925 to 1937.
