= Guardasone Castle =

Manor house in the province of Parma, Italy

Coordinates: 44°37′18″N 10°24′7″E

- Guardasone, village of Traversetolo, Emilia-Romagna, Italy
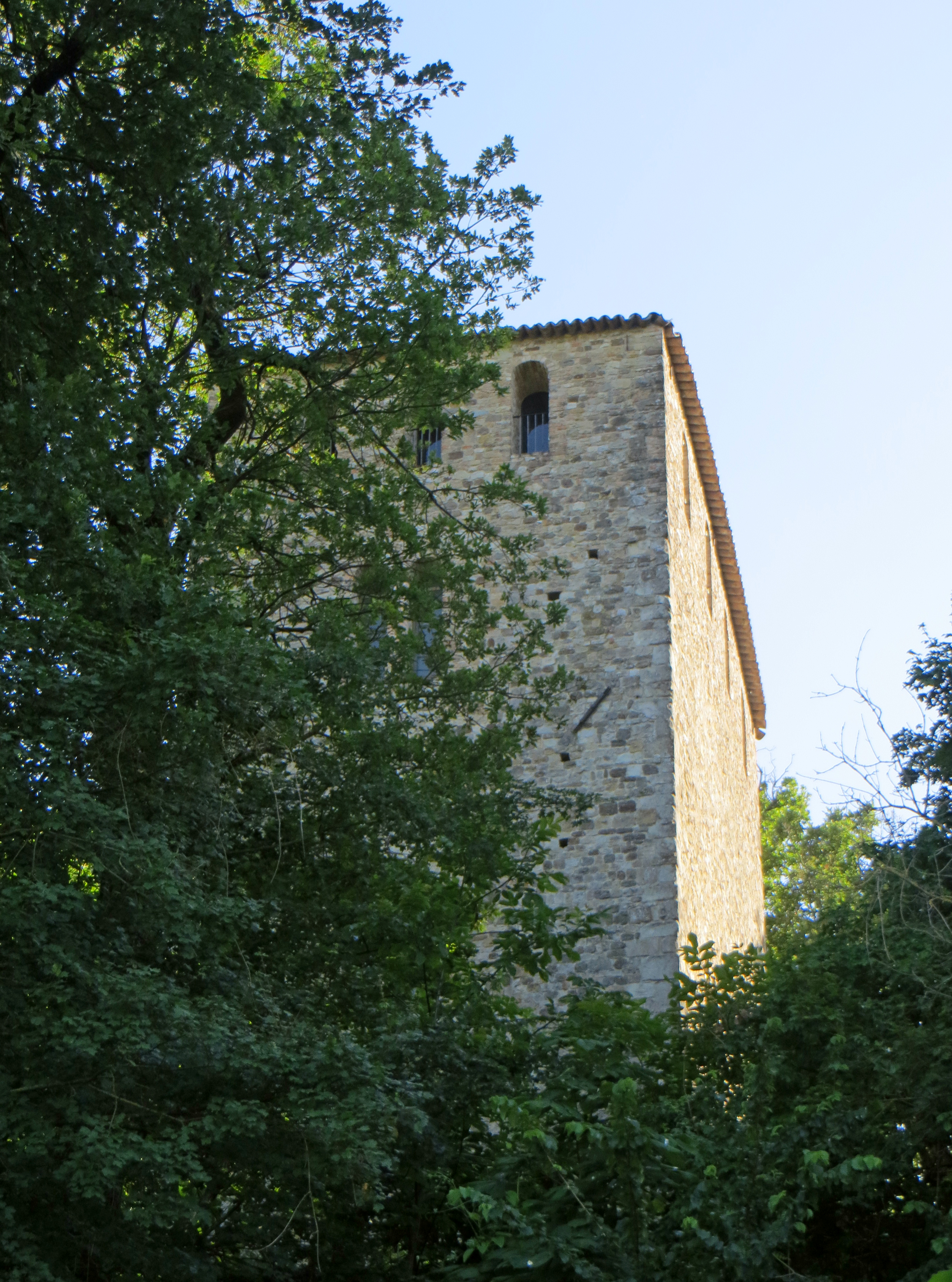
- Guardasone Castle (Traversetolo) - tower

Site information
- Type: Castle
- Owner: Alberto Rondani
- Open to the public: no
- Condition: Restored

Site history
- Built: possibly 10th, early 20th century
- In use: Presidium of the ford on the Enza stream
- Materials: Stone

Guardasone Castle is a medieval manor house that stands on the eastern slope of Mount Lugolo, in Ariana di Guardasone, a hamlet of Traversetolo, in the province of Parma; the ruins of the ancient watchtower, known as “Guardiola,” are also located on the summit.

== History ==
=== From the origins to the 13th century ===
The castle was built to guard the Ford on the Enza stream perhaps as early as the 10th century, but the first record of the existence of the court Guardasioni dates only to March 21, 1165. The structure belonged to the Baratti branch of the Counts of Canossa, cousins of the Attoni. The name of the locality, medieval Guardaxonis, possibly meaning "Guard of the Attoni," may have originated from them. The fortification served as a key defensive outpost for Canossa Castle, overseeing the control of Val d'Enza.

In 1248, the manor, subject to the commune of Parma, was occupied by the imperial army of Frederick II of Swabia during the Battle of Parma. Guelph troops from Parma, led by Rolando Rossi and sent by podestà Filippo Visdomini, recaptured it, putting King Enzo, the son of Frederick II, on the run.

In 1296, the castle of the Baratti Neri was occupied by the Ghibellines who had escaped from the city supported by the Marquis of Ferrara Azzo VIII d'Este; the Guelphs reconquered the manor, but after a few years, Azzo counterattacked and in revenge destroyed the building; the following year the municipality decreed that no more fortifications would be rebuilt in Guardasone.

=== 14th century ===
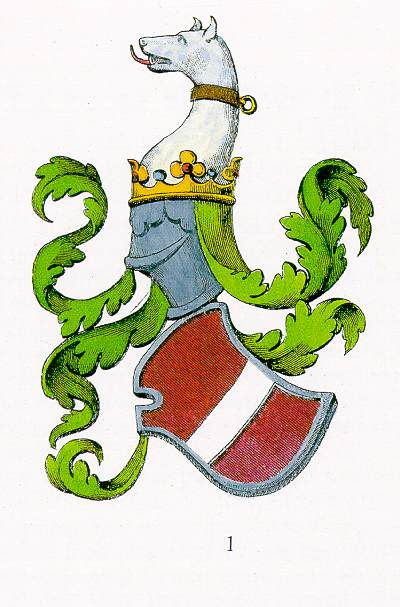
House of Da Correggio family

Between 1307 and 1310, Giberto III da Correggio had many of his enemies locked up in the manor's prisons, including members of the Rossi, Baratti, and Aldighieri families, who were later freed in 1312 at the behest of Emperor Henry VII of Luxembourg. In 1316 Giberto was driven out of Parma and retreated to Castelnovo; he allied with the da Palù and reorganized his army in his lands comprising Guardasone, Campegine, Guastalla, and Bazzano, among others; he fortified the manor of Guardasone and moved to attack the city, but was repulsed.

In the following decades, the Parmense and neighboring lands were ravaged by battles between opposing sides, which varied in time. In 1334 the regents of Parma, then Ghibellines, declared war on the Correggio people and sent troops, led by Marsilio de Rossi, to destroy Traversetolo and plunder Guardasone. In 1341 Azzo da Correggio, son of Giberto, fortified the castle, endowing it with a double circle of walls and building on the top of the mountain the watchtower of Montelugolo, known as “Guardiola”; The manor hosted for a few days Francesco Petrarca, Canon, in 1346, and then Archdeacon, from 1348, of the Chapter of Parma Cathedral. who composed the Latin-language poem La torre di Guardasone in honor of his stay. In 1346 Marquis Francesco d'Este again attacked the fortification.

In 1391, the village and castle were set on fire by troops from Bologna and Florence, who were allied against the lord of Milan, Gian Galeazzo Visconti.

=== 15th century ===
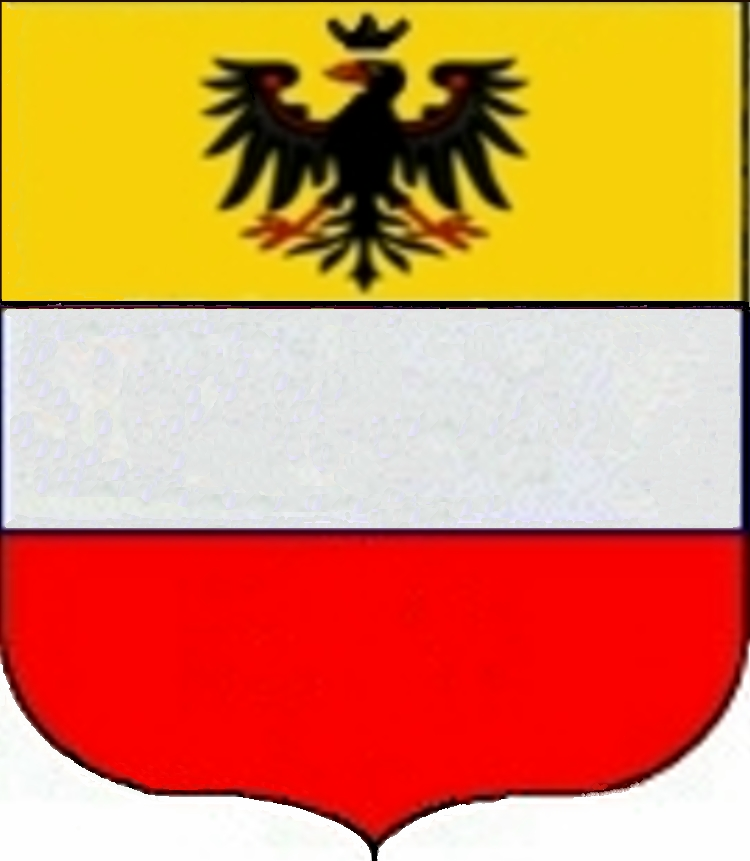
House of the Terzi Family

On April 19, 1402, Giberto da Correggio, son of Azzo, died in the manor, without offspring; Duke Gian Galeazzo forfeited his lands, who, with a diploma sealed on July 29, invested the Guardasone castle in the brothers Ottobuono de' Terzi, Giacomo and Giovanni, heirs of Niccolò Terzi the Elder. In addition to this, they were assigned the lands of Traversetolo, Montecchio Emilia, Scalochia, Bazzano, Rossena, Sassatello, Gombio, Brescello, Boretto, Gualtieri, Cavriago, and Colorno, formerly in the name of the late Giberto da Correggio. The concessions established in the ducal patent were fully confirmed for all purposes, after Gian Galeazzo's death a few months later, by the regents, the widowed duchess Caterina, guardian, and the young duke Giovanni Maria (Catarina Ducissa et Johannes Maria Anglus dux Mediolani), in a second deed, drawn up on November 18 of the same year.

In the following years, the Parmense was shaken by the clashes between the Terzi and the Rossi, who plundered the village and the manor of Guardasone in 1403. Two years later, Ottobuono had Gherardo degli Aldighieri imprisoned in the castle dungeons. In 1408, according to some historians, several men from the village and Borgo San Donnino allied with Orlando Pallavicino, conspired against the Terzi, who in reaction had 65 of them captured and beheaded in the courtyard of the fortress.

In 1409 he was treacherously killed in an ambush at Rubiera, at the hands of Muzio Attendolo Sforza with the complicity of Niccolò III d'Este, Ottobuono de' Terzi, lord of Parma and Reggio; his brother Giacomo then had his widow, Francesca da Fogliano, and their three very young children, Niccolò Carlo, ephemeral heir to his father's domains, Margherita and Caterina, sheltered inside the well-fortified fortress of Guardasone. He then sent 300 knights, led by Giovanni Malvicino, to reinforce the defenses of the manor; however, the troops were intercepted at Traversetolo by the Estense and defeated after a bitter battle. The inhabitants of Cazzola, Sivizzano, and Rivalta laid siege to the fortress of Guardasone, but the castellan, Pietro del Borgo, reacted with a sortie by routing the Red forces.

In September, Este troops led by Uguccione dei Contrari attacked the castle by bombardment, forcing the Terzi to surrender; Uguccione then became lord of Guardasone and Montelugolo. Ottobuono's widow, Francesca, received under the high protection of the Republic of Venice, in the early days of 1410, accompanied by her three children, left the Parmense to reach the fortress of Villa Bartolomea, a fief Ottobuono had inherited from his father Niccolò Terzi il Vecchio and kept between Legnago and Carpi. Giacomo Terzi, who took refuge instead in Borgo San Donnino, met his death in October, massacred under his castle at Fiorenzuola d'Arda by the Terrazzani who had passed to the Scotti, while he was attempting to go to the rescue of his brother Giovanni. (Note: James left a son, John Philip, who found refuge in the Marca Anconitana, and became progenitor of the Terzi of Fermo.)

In 1417, Uguccione, fearing an alliance between Orlando Pallavicino and Azzo Baratti, had the latter arrested and taken to the castle dungeon, then took possession of the manor of Castione de' Baratti.

In 1421, after the cession of Parma in exchange for Reggio Emilia by Niccolò III d'Este to Filippo Maria Visconti, the manor of Guardasone, on which Traversetolo and Castione de' Baratti also depended, was forfeited by the Duke of Milan, who entrusted it to the castellan Masino di Facino di Santo Alosio, and the following year had it supplied with ammunition.

In 1431, Filippo Maria Visconti assigned the fiefs of Guardasone and Colorno to his condottiere, trusted adviser, and diplomat, Niccolò de' Terzi, il Guerriero, Ottobuono's natural son, to reward him for his services.

In 1447, Pier Maria II de' Rossi, backed by the da Correggio, attacked and plundered the fortress of Guardasone, before continuing to Brescello; the following year Niccolò, fearing further attacks by the Duke of Ferrara Ercole I d'Este, urged his sons Ottobuono and Gaspare to fortify the castle and other defensive structures on his lands.

In 1449, Niccolò de' Terzi, the Guerriero, resenting Francesco Sforza as lord of Parma even though he had just confirmed to him the possession of all the fiefs, agreed with his friend Alfonso V of Aragon, king of Naples and also pretender to the Duchy of Milan by the will drawn up in his favor by Filippo Maria. He made his Parma fiefs available to support the Ambrosian Republic, which had succeeded the last of the Visconti in the government of the Milanese state. Moreover, by then, he was reduced to exhaustion, surrounded by the army of the Republic of Venice led by Sforza. King Alfonso, who had quartered his militia in Tuscany and Romagna, was thus able to dispose of advanced military bases against Sforza, such as the well-fortified fortresses of Colorno and Guardasone, placed to guard Parma, where he immediately dispatched eight hundred infantrymen. At the same time, Astorre II Manfred, in Faenza, commanded the dispatch of 1,500 horses and 500 infantrymen. However, Francesco Sforza, immediately informed of these hostile preparations, promptly forestalled Manfredi's assault, paying him an advance of a few thousand ducats in exchange for withdrawing his militia. The condottiero Alessandro Sforza, Francesco's brother, pushed his way under Guardasone and, with the help of his brothers Giberto VI, Manfredo I, and Niccolò II da Correggio, besieged the fortress, whose occupants, including the poet Basinio Basini, despairing of new aid, reached a surrender agreement after a few days. Custody of the castle was then entrusted initially to Manfredo and Giberto da Correggio and, in 1452, to Pier Maria II de' Rossi.

In 1466, Duke Galeazzo Maria Sforza assigned the castle to Giovanni and Vitaliano II Borromeo. In 1483, his brother-in-law Guido de' Rossi attempted to seize the manor with a stratagem: he sent his wife Ambrosina Borromeo, who pretended to have run away from her husband, to the brothers for help; however, the castellan did not fall for the trap, and in reaction, the Reds set fire to the houses in the village.

=== 16th to 18th century ===
House of the Borromeo family

In 1526, the Lansquenets managed to penetrate the manor, which they raided.

In January 1551, during the Parma War, the castle, which was strategic for the city's victualling, was captured by the French allies of Duke Ottavio Farnese; Ferrante I Gonzaga and Gian Giacomo Medici did not immediately intervene, giving the occupants a chance to reinforce it, and later failed to retake it.

A few years later, in 1558, the Duke of Ferrara Ercole II d'Este, after conquering the castles of San Polo, Canossa, and Rossena, unexpectedly attacked the mighty manor, which was poorly manned, and easily took possession of it; he also conquered the nearby Guardiola in a short time. Ottavio Farnese reacted by first attacking the tower of Montelugolo with bombardment, almost destroying it; he then shifted his fire to the castle, in which the entire Ferrara garrison led by Count Alessandro Rangoni had taken refuge; in the night the occupants sneaked away during the cannonade, which razed the entire structure to the ground, except for the keep alone.

In 1652, Count Renato II Borromeo married Giulia Arese, daughter of Count Bartolomeo III, and inherited half of his father-in-law's estate; he also added his wife's surname to his own, giving rise to the Borromeo Arese family.

=== From the 19th to the 21st century ===
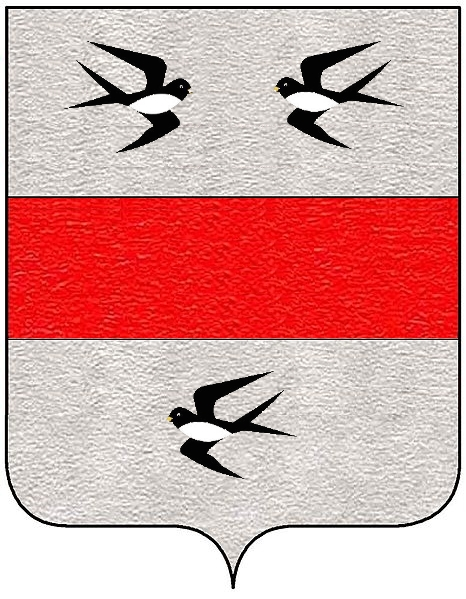
House of the Rondani family

In the early 19th century, the castle, of which only part of the walls and the keep tower remained, was purchased by the Medici family; a few years later the manor was alienated to the priest Gian Battista Rondani, whose brother Camillo, an entomologist, built his study there.

By 1903, at the behest of his nephew Alberto Rondani, the keep was restored by modifying its windows and roof; a few years later, a large wing developed on an L-shaped plan was also built adjacent to the tower.

The manor still belongs to the Rondani family.

== Description ==
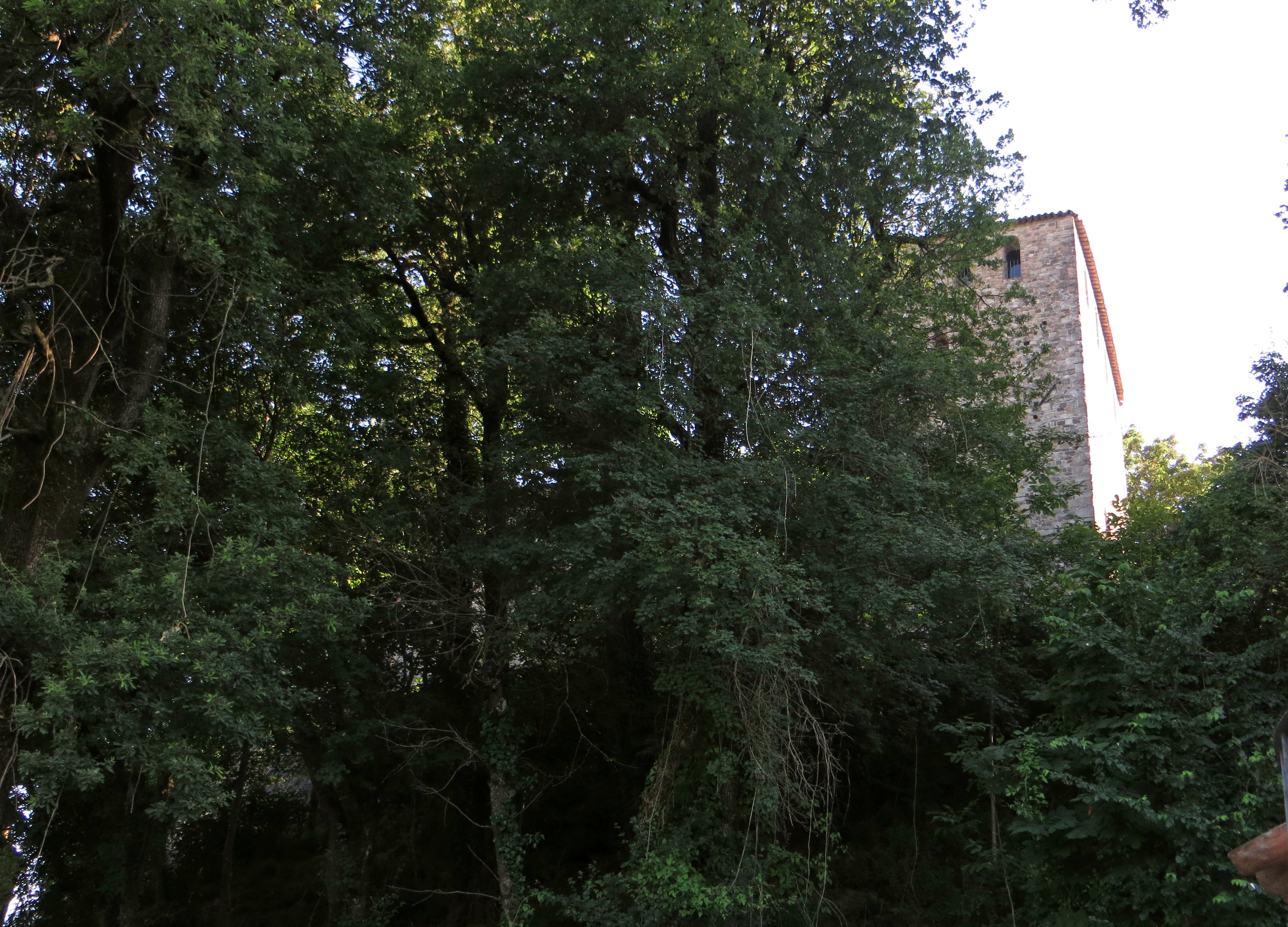
The keep visible among the bush

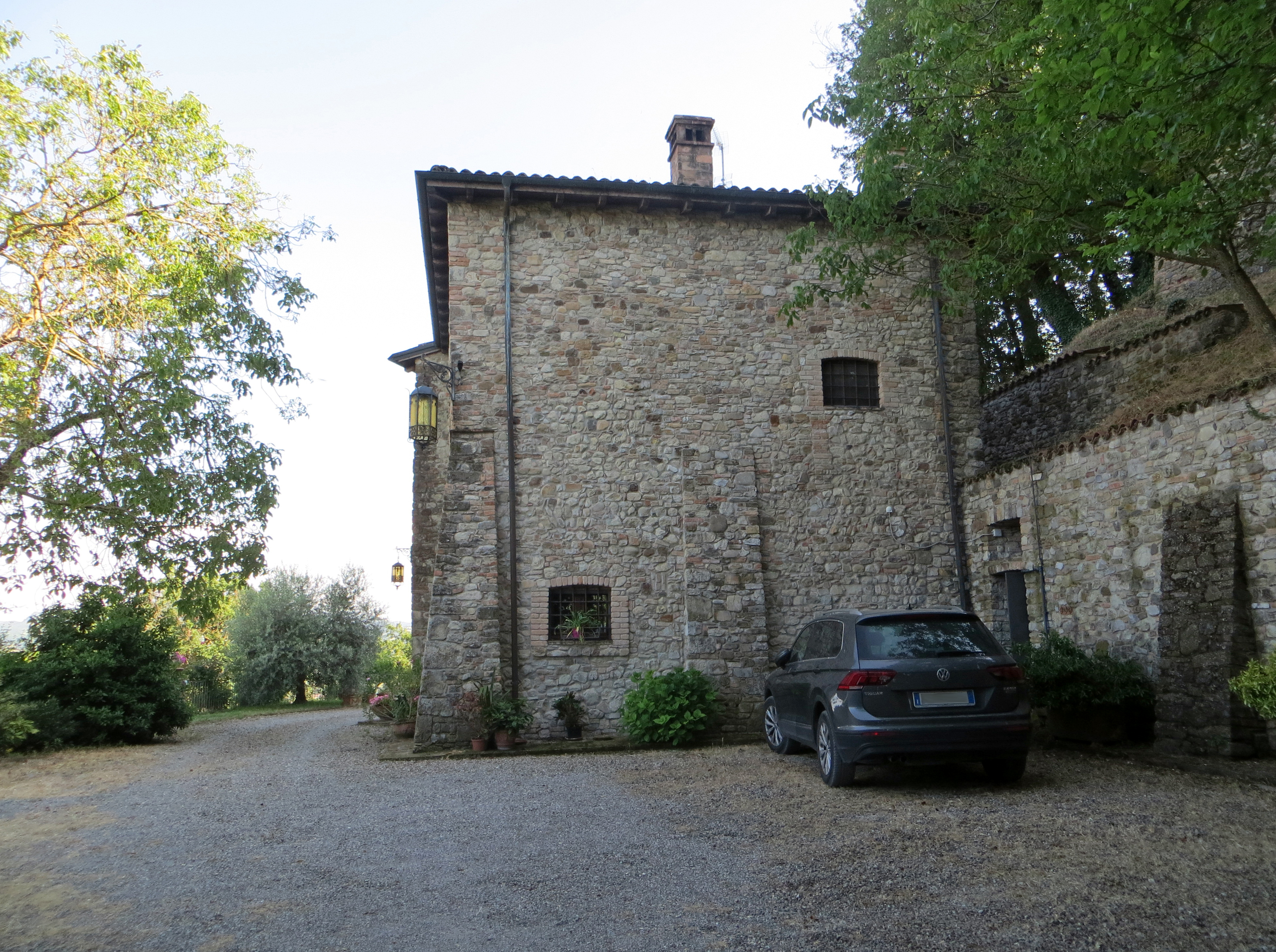
The outbuildings at the foot of the castle

Of the ancient mighty stone castle only the large keep developed on an unusual rectangular plan survives; adjacent to the tower an L-shaped body, added in the early 20th century, articulates toward the east.

The tall and massive keep rises on four main levels above ground; on the west side there is an ogival-arched portal, originally facing the parade ground; the first three floors are characterized by the presence of wide mullioned windows with central columns, opened by 1903, while on the last level, there are several single lancet windows with a crowning, modified around 1900, round-arched arch along the perimeter.

In contrast, the twentieth-century building, also made of stone, has no noteworthy architectural evidence.

Around the castle rise along the slope the ruins of medieval walls, lacking a crowning.

=== Guardiola ===
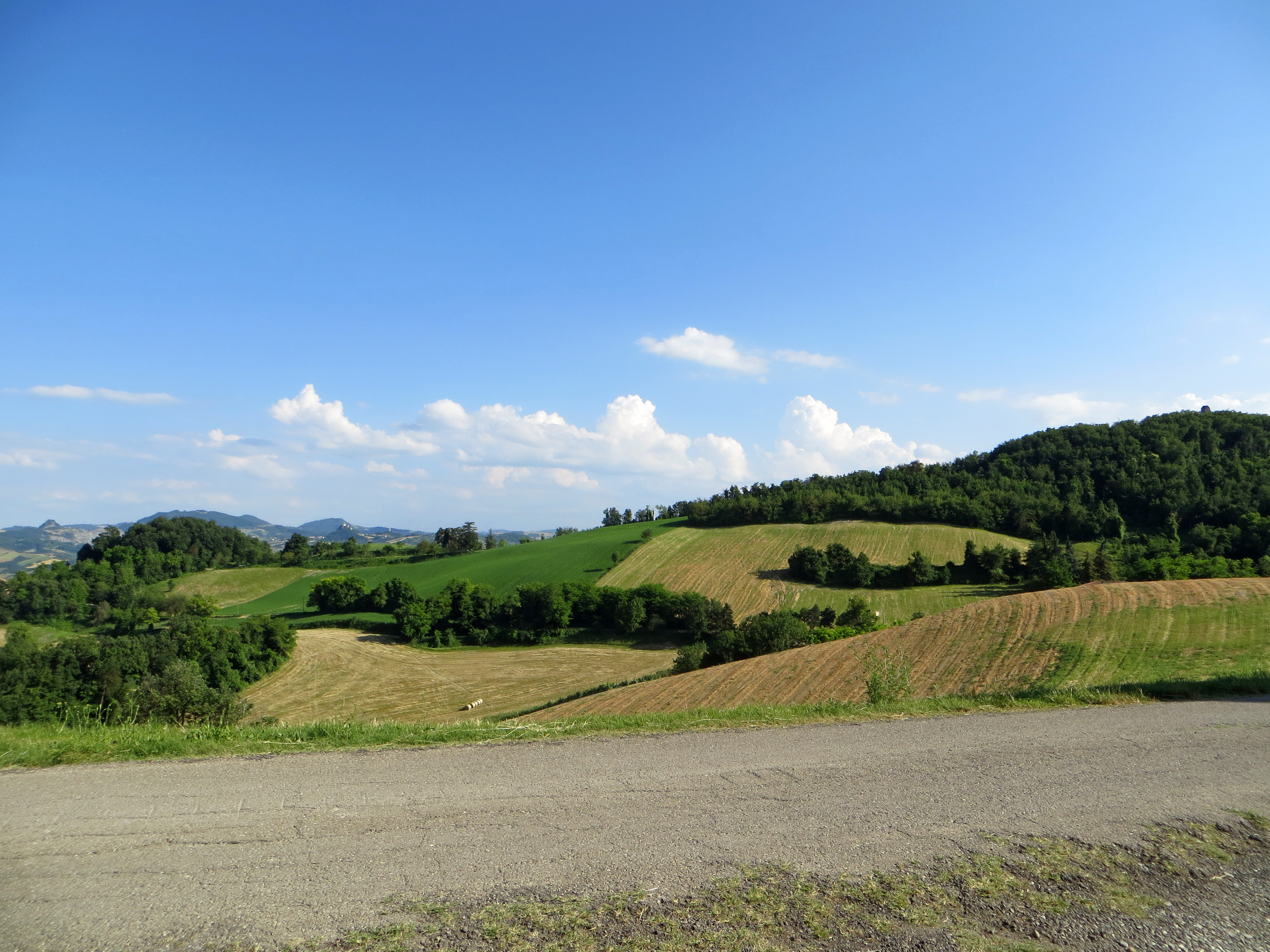
The hills on which the castle stands, left, and the Guardiola, right

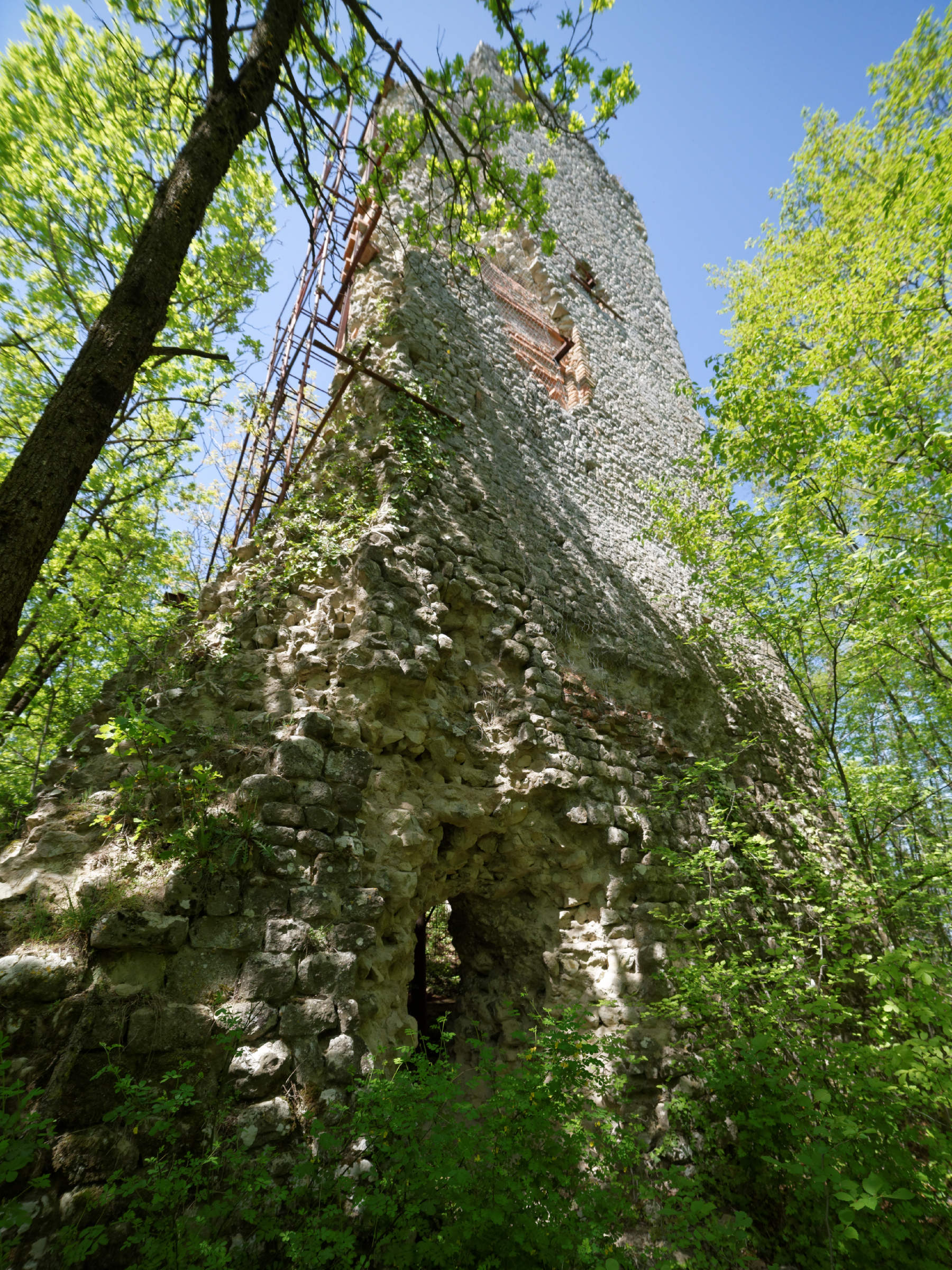
The remains of the Guardiola

La Guardiola stands on Mount Lugolo, a few hundred meters west of the castle.

Only the ruins of the outer walls remain of the old stone watchtower, originally elevated on three levels.

== The alleged ghost ==
Like many castles, the manor of Guardasone would also seem to harbor a ghost; according to legend, Ottobuono de' Terzi did not die by treachery in Rubiera, but was killed in an ambush by the women of Guardasone, as revenge for the massacre of 65 men of the village he ordered; abandoned in the woods without a burial, he would wander restlessly near Guardiola ever since.

== See also ==
- Traversetolo
- House of Canossa
- Parma
- House of Borromeo
- Duchy of Parma and Piacenza
- Rondani

== Bibliography ==
- Affò, Ireneo (1793). Storia della città di Parma, Tomo terzo [History of the City of Parma, Volume Three] (in Italian). Parma: Stamperia Carmignani. p. 416.
- Affò, Ireneo (1795). Storia della città di Parma, Tomo quarto [History of the City of Parma, Volume four] (in Italian). Parma: Stamperia Carmignani.
- Affò, Ireneo (2008) [1794]. Memorie storiche di Colorno [Historical Memoirs of Colorno] (in Italian). Parma: Forno. p. 82. ISBN 9788827128008.
- Angeli, Buonaventura (2018) [1591]. La historia della città di Parma, et la descrittione del fiume Parma [The History of the City of Parma, and the Description of the Parma River] (in Italian). Parma: Erasmo Viotto. ISBN 9780428488000.
- Arcangeli, Letizia; Gentile, Marco (2007). Le signorie dei Rossi di Parma tra XIV e XVI secolo [The lordships of the Rossi of Parma between the 14th and 16th centuries] (in Italian). Firenze: Firenze University Press. ISBN 978-88-8453-683-9.
- Calidoni, Mario; Basteri, Maria Cristina; Bottazzi, Gianluca; Rapetti, Caterina; Rossi, Sauro (2009). Castelli e borghi. Alla ricerca dei luoghi del Medioevo a Parma e nel suo territori [Castles and villages. In search of the places of the Middle Ages in Parma and its territories] (in Italian). Parma: MUP Editore. ISBN 978-88-7847-241-9.
- Capacchi, Guglielmo (1979). Castelli parmigiani [Castles of Parma] (in Italian). Parma: Artegrafica Silva. ISBN 978-8877650177.
- Cirillo, Giuseppe; Godi, Giovanni (1986). Guida artistica del Parmense, II volume [Artistic Guide to the Parma area, Volume II] (in Italian). Parma: Artegrafica Silva. ISBN 978-88-7765-035-1.
- Cont, Paolo (2019). I Terzi di Parma, Sissa e Fermo, Prefazione di Marco Gentile, Seconda edizione riveduta e corretta ("Fonti e Studi", serie II, XIV-2) [The Terzi of Parma, Sissa and Fermo, Preface by Marco Gentile, Second revised and corrected edition (“Sources and Studies,” Series II, XIV-2)] (in Italian). Parma: presso la Deputazione di Storia Patria per le Province Parmensi. ISBN 978-88-941135-5-6.
- Dall'Aglio, Ítalo (1966). La Diocesi di Parma, I Volume [The Diocese of Parma, Volume I] (in Italian). Parma: Scuola Tipografica Benedettina.
- DSP (1974). "Deputazione di Storia Patria per le Province Parmensi, Archivio Storico per le Province Parmensi" [Deputation of Homeland History for the Provinces of Parma, Historical Archives for the Provinces of Parma]. deputazionestoriapatriaparma1860.it (in Italian).
- Dionisotti, Carlo (1887). Le Famiglie Celebri Medioevali dell'Italia Superiore [The Famous Medieval Families of Upper Italy] (in Italian). Torino: Tipografia L. Roux e C.
- Pezzana, Angelo (1837). Storia della città di Parma continuata, Tomo primo [History of the City of Parma Continued, Volume One] (in Italian). Parma: Ducale Tipografia.
- Pezzana, Angelo (1842). Storia della città di Parma continuata, Tomo secondo [History of the City of Parma Continued, Volume Two] (in Italian). Parma: Ducale Tipografia.
- Pezzana, Angelo (1847). Storia della città di Parma continuata, Tomo terzo [History of the City of Parma Continued, Volume Three] (in Italian). Parma: Ducale Tipografia. p. 534.
- Rabà, Michele Maria (2016). Potere e poteri. "Stati", "privati" e comunità nel conflitto per l'egemonia in Italia settentrionale (1536-1558) [Power and Powers. “States,” “privates,” and communities in the conflict for hegemony in northern Italy (1536-1558)] (in Italian). Milan: Franco Angeli. ISBN 9788891745163.
- Sormani, Matteo Turconi (2015). Le grandi famiglie di Milano [The great families of Milan] (in Italian). Rome: Newton Compton Editori. ISBN 9788854187146.
- Zuccagni-Orlandini, Attilio (1893). Corografia fisica, storica e statistica dell'Italia e delle sue isole, Italia superiore o settentrionale Parte VI [Physical, historical and statistical chorography of Italy and its islands, Upper or northern Italy Part VI] (PDF) (in Italian). Firenze: presso gli Editori.
