= Traversetolo =

- Comune
- Comune di Traversetolo
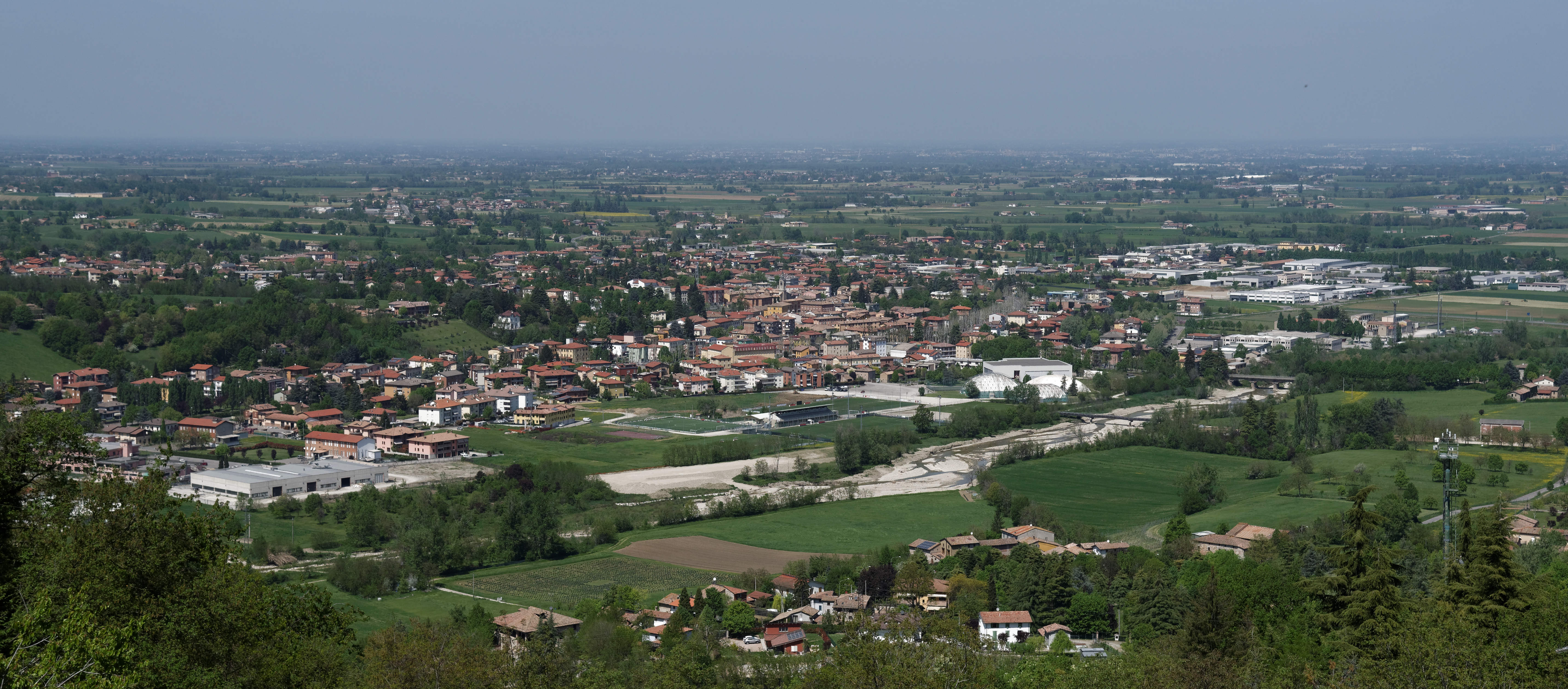

- Location within Italy Location within Emilia-Romagna
- Coordinates: 44°38′N 10°23′E
- Country: Italy
- Region: Emilia-Romagna
- Province: Parma (PR)
- Frazioni: Ariana, Bannone, Borgo Bottone, Borgo Salice, Campagna, Cantone, Carcarecchio, Case Cavalli, Case Montefiascone, Case Pozzo, Case Ronchei, Castellaro, Castione de' Baratti, Cazzola, Cevola, Cronovilla, Gabbiola, Gavazzo, Guardasone, Il Borgo, La Casa, La Fornace, Mamiano, Mazzola, Orio, Sbizzini, Sivizzano, Stafei, Stombellini, Torre, Val Cassano, Vignale, Villa Carbognani.

Government
  - Mayor: Simone Dall'Orto

Area
  - Total: 54.86 km^{2} (21.18 sq mi)
- Elevation: 176 m (577 ft)

Population (31 December 2016)
  - Total: 9,425
  - Density: 171.8/km^{2} (445.0/sq mi)
- Demonym: Traversetolesi
- Time zone: UTC+1 (CET)
  - Summer (DST): UTC+2 (CEST)
- Postal code: 43029
- Dialing code: 0521

Traversetolo (Parmigiano: Travarsèddol) is a comune (municipality) in the Province of Parma in the Italian region Emilia-Romagna, located about 80 kilometres (50 mi) west of Bologna and about 20 kilometres (12 mi) south of Parma.

Traversetolo borders the following municipalities: Canossa, Lesignano de' Bagni, Montechiarugolo, Neviano degli Arduini, Parma, San Polo d'Enza.

== See also ==
- Magnani-Rocca Foundation
- Guardasone Castle

== Twin towns ==
- Oraison, France
- Majano, Italy
