= Castelnovo ne' Monti =

- Comune
- Comune di Castelnovo ne' Monti
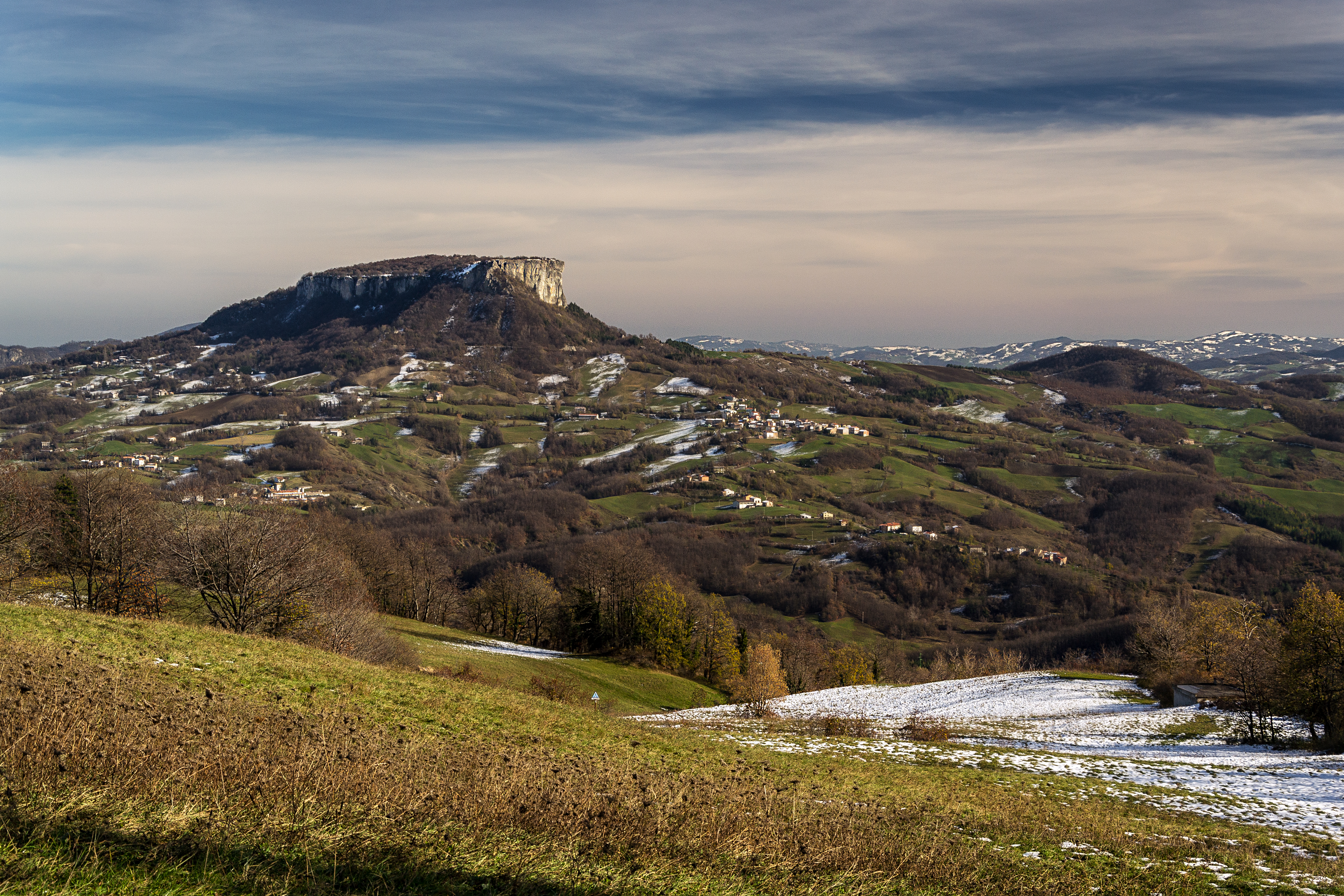
- View of Castelnovo ne' Monti

- Flag Coat of arms

- Location within Italy Location within Emilia-Romagna
- Coordinates: 44°26′N 10°24′E
- Country: Italy
- Region: Emilia-Romagna
- Province: Reggio Emilia (RE)
- Frazioni: see list

Government
  - Mayor: Enrico Bini

Area
  - Total: 96 km^{2} (37 sq mi)
- Elevation: 700 m (2,300 ft)

Population (31 December 2016)
  - Total: 10,451
  - Density: 110/km^{2} (280/sq mi)
- Demonym: Castelnovesi
- Time zone: UTC+1 (CET)
  - Summer (DST): UTC+2 (CEST)
- Postal code: 42035
- Dialing code: 0522
- Website: Official website

Castelnovo Monti (officially Castelnovo ne' Monti; locally Castalnöv) is a town and comune in the province of Reggio Emilia, northern Italy.

Castelnovo is an approved area for the production of Parmesan cheese. It is also home to the only hospital in the local reggiano appennine mountains.

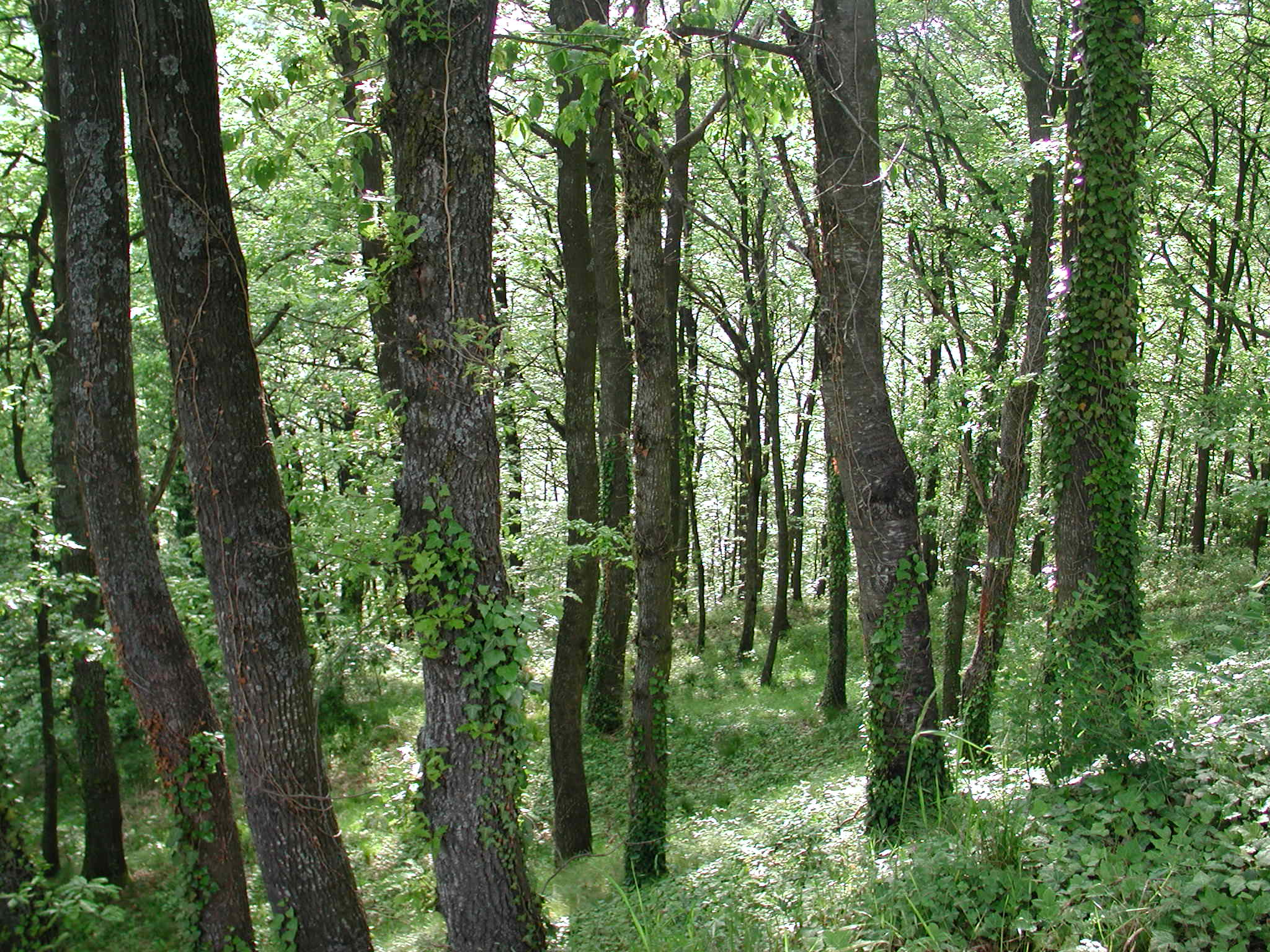
A typical oak landscape in the Castelnovo's Apennines.

== Geography ==
It is situated in the Reggiano Apennines mountains.

Castelnovo is best known for the Pietra di Bismantova spur. The pietra (literally "Rock of Bismantova") can be spotted from a distance of 30 kilometres (19 mi) as it stands at around 1,047 metres (3,435 ft) above sea level. The rock is a favourite climbing and abseiling destination throughout Italy and is considered a particularly difficult climb due to its outward-curving wall. The rock was mentioned by the Italian poet Dante Alighieri in the Divine Comedy.

Other geographical landmarks include the Triassic chalk formations of the Gessi Triassici and the river Secchia which, together with the Pietra of Bismantova, are part of the National Park of the Appennino Tosco-Emiliano.

Coat of Arms until 1961

== Frazioni ==
Bellaria, Bellessere, Berzana, Bondolo, Bora del Musso, Burano, Ca' del Cavo, Ca' del Grosso, Ca' di Magnano, Ca' di Scatola, Campolungo, Capanna, Ca' Pavoni, Carnola, Casa della Carità, Casale, Case di Sopra, Case Perizzi, Casino, Castagnedolo, Cerreto, Chiesa, Cinqueterre, Colombaia, Costa de' Grassi, Croce, Eremo Bismantova, Fariolo, Felina, Felinamata, Frascaro, Garfagnolo, Gatta, Gombio, Maro, Monchio, Monchio di Villaberza, Monte Castagneto, Monteduro, Monticello, Mozzola, Noce, Parisola, Pietrebianche, Pioppella, Pregheffio, Quarqua, Regnola, Rio, Rivolvecchio, Roncadelli, Ronchi, Roncroffio, Schiezza, Soraggio, Terminaccio, Vezzolo, Vigolo, Virola, Vologno di Sotto, Zugognago.

== Transportation ==
Castelnovo is connected to Reggio Emilia by a bus service run by ACT. Roads include SS 63 State road (to Reggio), the SS 513 state road (to the province of Parma), and the SP 7 and SP 15 provincial roads (to the province of Modena).

== Twin towns ==
Castelnovo ne' Monti is twinned with:

- Fivizzano, Italy
- Illingen, Baden-Württemberg, Germany
- Voreppe, France
