= Rondani =

Rondani is an Italian surname. Notable people having this name include:

- Camillo Rondani, (1808–1879), an Italian entomologist noted for his studies of Diptera
- Giovanni Maria Francesco Rondani (1490–1550), Italian painter of the Parmesan school of painting
- Dino Rondani (1868-1951), an Italian socialist politician, lawyer and parliamentarian
