= Gombio, Castelnovo ne' Monti =

Gombio
- Frazione
- Location of Gombio in Italy
- Coordinates: 44°30′N 10°26′E
- Country: Italy
- Region: Emilia-Romagna
- Province: Reggio Emilia (RE)
- Comune: Castelnovo ne' Monti
- Elevation: 584 m (1,916 ft)

Population
  - Total: 66
- Time zone: UTC+1 (CET)
  - Summer (DST): UTC+2 (CEST)
- Postal code: 42035
- Dialing code: 0522

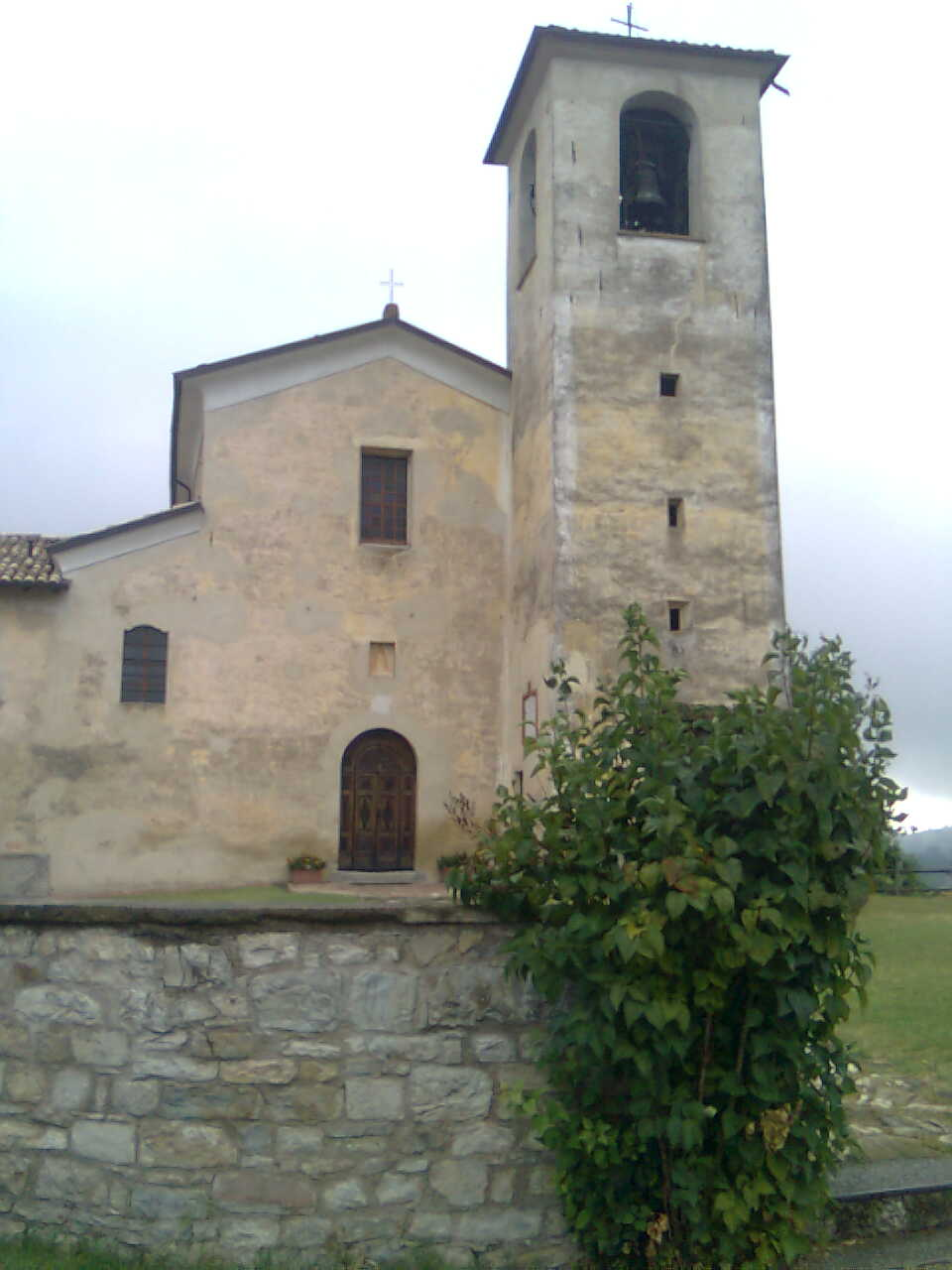
Main facade of the old church of Gombio

Gombio is a frazione of the comune of Castelnovo ne' Monti, in the province of Reggio nell'Emilia, in the region of Emilia Romagna.

The population is estimated at around 66 inhabitants. The village is located 584 meters (1,916 ft) above sea level.

== Geography ==
The village is located on the northern slopes of Monte Gombio in the area between the Tassobbio stream and the Rio di Leguigno. The inhabited area is composed of numerous small villages not far from each other, surrounded by clays and calanques. Some of the most significant villages are: Casa Scarenzi, Casa Ferrari, Ottole and Soraggio.

== Demographics ==
The village today is inhabited by a few families and few young people. In the past, up until the Second World War, there were about 600 inhabitants, but when the war was over, the move towards the big cities emptied the village. It partially repopulates during the summer when those who live in the city fall.

== Economy ==
=== Tourism ===
In the summer season the town is populated by vacationers, mostly children and grandchildren of former migrants. The main gathering place for parties is the village club which organizes various events throughout the year and especially in the summer.

== Culture ==
- Church of the Assumption of the Blessed Virgin Mary (XIV century)
- 16th-century tower houses
- Dovecote of the XIV century
- Castle bank
