= Lithuanian–Polish–Ukrainian Brigade =

Trinational military unit formed in 2014

Lithuanian–Polish–Ukrainian Brigade "TLATAS"
- Active: 2009 (formed, operational ready since 2016)–present
- Country: Lithuania; Poland; Ukraine
- Role: Participation in international peace-keeping and humanitarian operations under the auspices of international organizations
- Size: 4,500
- Garrison/HQ: Lublin, Poland
- Nickname: LITPOLUKRBRIG
- Patron: Konstanty Ostrogski
- Motto: United for peace
- Website: https://litpolukrbrig.wp.mil.pl/en/

Commanders
- Current commander: Polish Land Forces Col. Piotr Lisowski
- Deputy Commander: Lithuanian Land Forces Col. Mindaugas Statkus
- Chief of Staff: Ukrainian Ground Forces Lt. Col. Oleksandr Lunov

Insignia
- Shoulder sleeve insignia

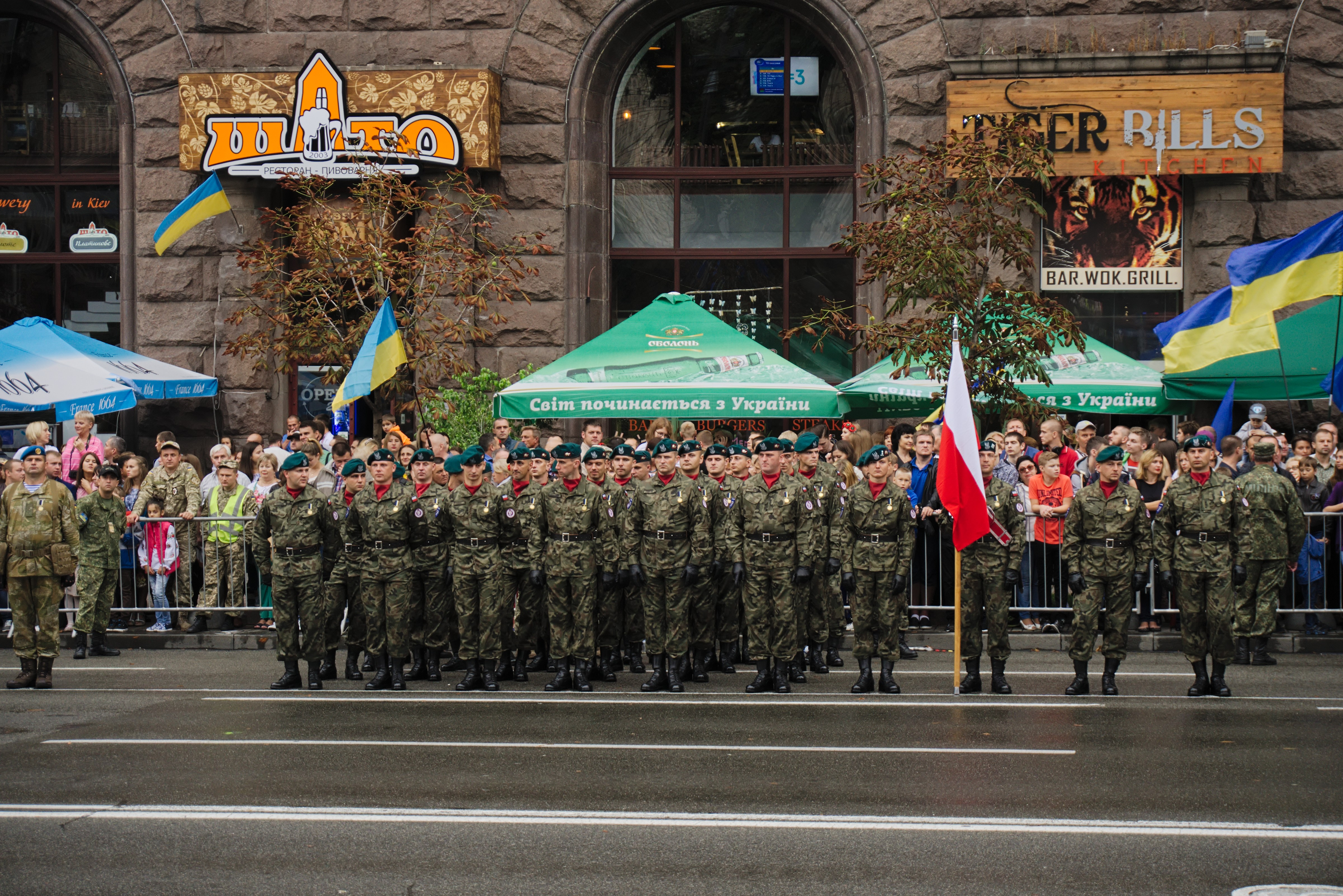
Members of the Polish-Lithuanian-Ukrainian Brigade in on the street during a 2016 parade in Kyiv

Lithuanian–Polish–Ukrainian Brigade "TLATAS" (LITPOLUKRBRIG; Lithuanian: Lietuvos-Lenkijos-Ukrainos brigada, LITPOLUKRBRIG; Ukrainian: Литовсько-Польсько-Українська Бригада, ЛИТПОЛУКРБРИГ; Polish: Brygada litewsko-polsko-ukraińska) is a multinational brigade consisting of units from the Lithuanian, Polish and Ukrainian armies. They coincide with the countries of the Lublin Triangle, but other countries are free to join the trilateral agreement. An agreement on its creation was signed on November 16, 2009. The brigade was to reach operational status in autumn 2011, but it was delayed; a January 2012 estimate put that date at some time in 2013. The unit was finally formed on September 19, 2014. In July 2015 the defense ministers of the three countries signed an agreement on the operation of the unit.

The LITPOLUKRBRIG headquarters (HQ) was opened in Lublin (Poland) on 25 January 2016.

Lithuania and Poland are NATO members, while Ukraine is an Enhanced Opportunity Partner of NATO.

== Name ==
It was named after hetman Konstanty Ostrogski in 2017.

== History ==
First logo

On June 14, 2007, during an EU Defence Ministers' meeting, Lithuanian, Polish and Ukrainian ministers agreed to create a multinational unit. In fall of 2008 the proposed unit type was specified as a brigade. The three countries did have experience in past joint military operations, most notably, through the Lithuanian-Polish Peace Force Battalion and the Polish–Ukrainian Peace Force Battalion. Lithuania and Poland are NATO members, Ukraine is not currently NATO member, but requested to join the NATO Membership Action Plan in January 2008. In November 2009 a "Protocol of Intent" covering formation of a joint Lithuanian, Polish and Ukrainian brigade ("LITPOLUKRBRIG") was signed by Defense Minister of Lithuania, Rasa Jukneviciene, Deputy Secretary of the Polish Ministry of Defense Stanisław Komorowski (representing the indisposed Defense Minister of Poland, Bogdan Klich) and acting Defense Minister of Ukraine Valeriy Ivashchenko.

On March 17, 2014, The Daily Telegraph reported, as part of its live coverage of the annexation of Crimea by the Russian Federation, that Poland's defence ministry had announced it was re-launching plans to establish a joint Polish, Ukrainian and Lithuanian military brigade.

The ministry said "defence ministers would meet later that week to discuss the formation of the brigade that would straddle Nato’s eastern border and bring Ukraine’s armed forces closer to the Western fold".

In February 2016, the brigade participated in the training exercise "Brave Band".

== Organization ==
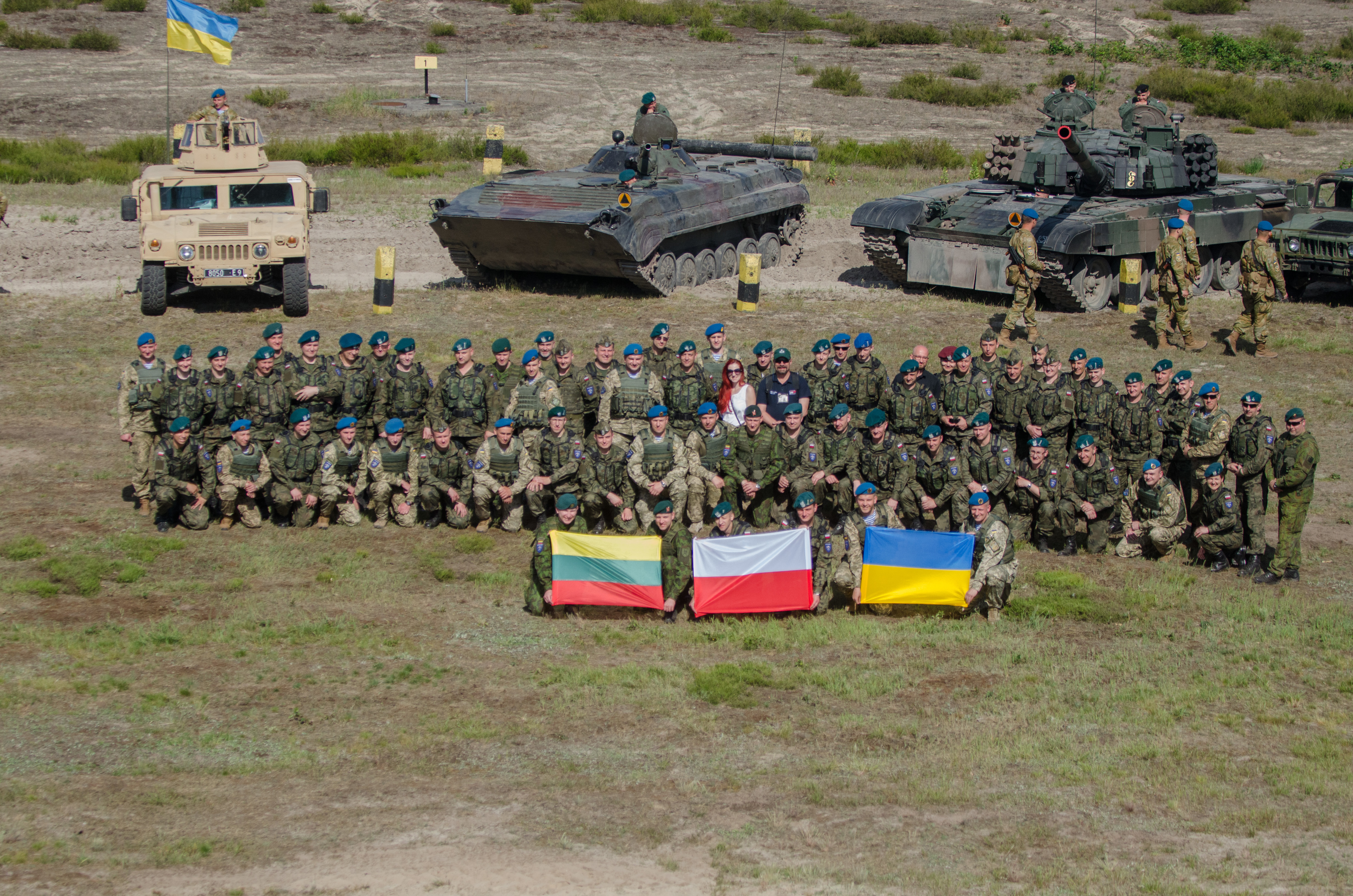
LITPOLUKRBRIG, 2016

The brigade has its headquarters and staff in Lublin, Poland, with the national components stationed in their respective countries and actually gathering together only for exercises and foreign missions. Only its staff officers are supposed to cooperate on a regular basis. The unit is intended to be used to fulfill tasks given to it by NATO, European Union (EU) and the United Nations. The operating language of the brigade is agreed to be English. The unit was formed on 19 September 2014. Headquarters was officially opened in Lublin on 25 January 2016, in a ceremony attended by defence ministers of the three countries.

Each member deploys an infantry battalion, special operations personnel, and headquarters staff to the alliance. The bulk of the deployments are the Lithuanian Grand Duchess Birute Uhlan Battalion, Poland's 3rd Mechanized Battalion(whose parent organization is the 19th Mechanized Brigade), and the Ukrainian 1st Air Assault Battalion of the 80th Airborne Brigade.

== Political ramifications ==
The agreement between Lithuania, Poland and Ukraine was signed two days before an EU summit with Russia aimed at increasing cooperation between the two. Analysts expected the formation of the brigade could anger Russia, because Russia is against Ukraine joining NATO. A NATO spokesman welcomed the Polish-Lithuanian plan, stating that cooperation may increase trust and capabilities.

According to Poland's Deputy Defence Minister Stanisław Komorowski "This move reflects our support for Ukraine. We want to tie Ukraine closer to Western structures, including military ones".

In November 2009 Polish newspaper Gazeta Wyborcza predicted the chances that the brigade would become a reality were larger if Yulia Tymoshenko would win the 2010 Ukrainian presidential election, and smaller if Viktor Yanukovych would win them. Yanukovych won the elections, but preparations for the brigade continued. Yanukovych stated on May 27, 2010 that Ukraine considered Ukraine's relations with NATO as a partnership, "And Ukraine can't live without this [partnership], because Ukraine is a large country".

Despite initial concerns that the LITPOLUKRBRIG provoked Russia, since 2016 the "Trilateral Brigade" (this term is used by the US military to identify the unit) has continued operating out of Lublin and pursued its "four main missions of international cooperation: executing and participating in battle staff training, battalion staff officer courses, multinational exercises, and activities of the Joint Military Training Group–Ukraine." Even with the 2022 Russo-Ukrainian War, the Trilateral Brigade HQ is staffed by a blend of army personnel: 5 Lithuanians, 58 Poles, and 18 Ukrainians. This HQ can plan, organize, command, and control approximately 4,500 LITPOLUKR troops for international military operations. Finally, the success of the Trilateral Brigade has led two researchers - Lt Col Jahara Matisek (US Naval War College) and Prof. Will Reno (Northwestern University) - to contend in 2022 that this unit provides a comparative advantage and flexible options against Russia, and is a model for future security cooperation between NATO and non-NATO militaries.

At the start of the Russian invasion of Ukraine in 2022, the brigade started working in refuge camps and in and around the Polish-Ukrainian border to aid the Ukrainian soldiers family as well as aiding many others with homes and supplies. Meanwhile, American–Polish military cooperation strengthened in the form of joint training with the 82nd Airborne Division on 1 April 2022. At around this period of time, fake news spread of several brigades including the LITPOLUKRBRIG being sent to Southern Ukraine to fight on the Kherson front consisting of 9,500 men and 279 pieces of equipment. On the same day, the LITPOLUKRBRIG Twitter account made an official statement that the alleged paper stating that Poland would send soldiers over to fight was not true.

== See also ==
- European Army – Defence policy of the European Union
- European army – Proposed army
- Multinational Engineer Battalion Tisa
- Military of the European Union
- Multinational Corps Northeast - NATO formation grouping units from Denmark, Germany and Poland
- Polish–Lithuanian Commonwealth (historical)
