= Poland–Ukraine relations =

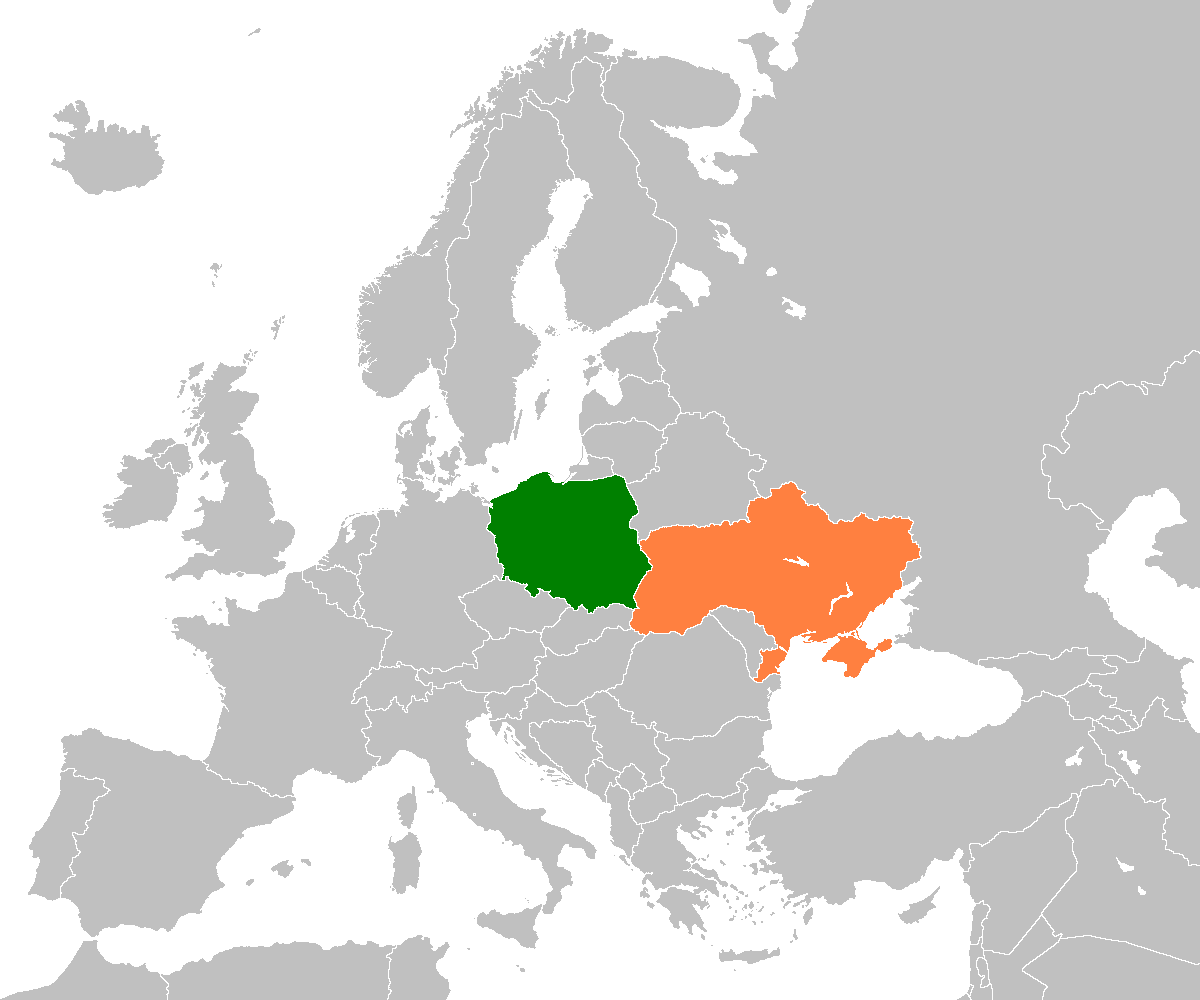
- Poland: Ukraine

Diplomatic mission
- Embassy of Poland, Kyiv: Embassy of Ukraine, Warsaw

Poland–Ukraine relations revived on an international basis soon after Ukraine gained independence from the Soviet Union in 1991. Poland was the first country to recognize the independence of Ukraine. Various controversies from the shared history of the two countries' peoples occasionally resurface in Polish–Ukrainian relations, tending not to have a major impact on bilateral relations until tensions arose in 2026.

Ukraine and Poland are respectively, the second- and third-largest Slavic nations, after Russia. The two countries share a border of about 529 km (329 mi). Poland's 2003 acceptance of the 1985 Schengen Agreement created problems with Ukrainian border traffic. On July 1, 2009, an agreement on local border traffic between the two countries came into effect, which enables Ukrainian citizens living in border regions to cross the Polish frontier according to a liberalized procedure.

Ukraine is a member of the Eastern Partnership, a European Union project initiated by Poland in 2009, which aims to provide an avenue for discussions of trade, economic strategy, travel agreements, and other issues between the EU and its Eastern European neighbours.

Ukraine is the country with the largest number of Polish consulates. The two countries have a long shared history – some parts of western Ukraine (such as Lviv) formed part of the Polish state for several centuries and parts of eastern Poland once had large native Ukrainian populations; the demographics of the regions along the Polish-Ukrainian border were profoundly affected by the 1944 to 1946 population exchange between Poland and Soviet Ukraine and actions such as the 1947 Operation Vistula in the aftermath of World War II. Poland supports Ukraine's European Union and NATO membership.

In May–June 2026, existing tensions between the two countries over the WWII massacres of Polish civilians by Ukrainians – which had already disrupted cooperation in previous years – flared up significantly after Ukrainian president Volodymyr Zelenskyy named an elite unit of the Ukrainian military after the "Heroes of the Ukrainian Insurgent Army" (UIA; УПА, UPA), the nationalist partisan movement which carried out the massacres with the aid of Ukrainian peasants and moral support of the Ukrainian Greek Catholic Church. Polish president Karol Nawrocki responded by stripping Zelenskyy of the Order of the White Eagle, Poland's highest state honor. Nawrocki also stated that Ukraine "has shown that it may not be ready to join the European family", hinting at possible Polish roadblocks to Ukraine's accession to the EU. The initial fallout of Zelenskyy's decision to name the unit after the UPA caused significant controversy in Poland, while Nawrocki's decision to revoke Zelenskyy's award caused outrage from Ukrainian politicians, including Ukraine's ambassador to Poland and three former Ukrainian presidents, all of whom rescinded their own awards from as far back as 1997.

== History of relations ==
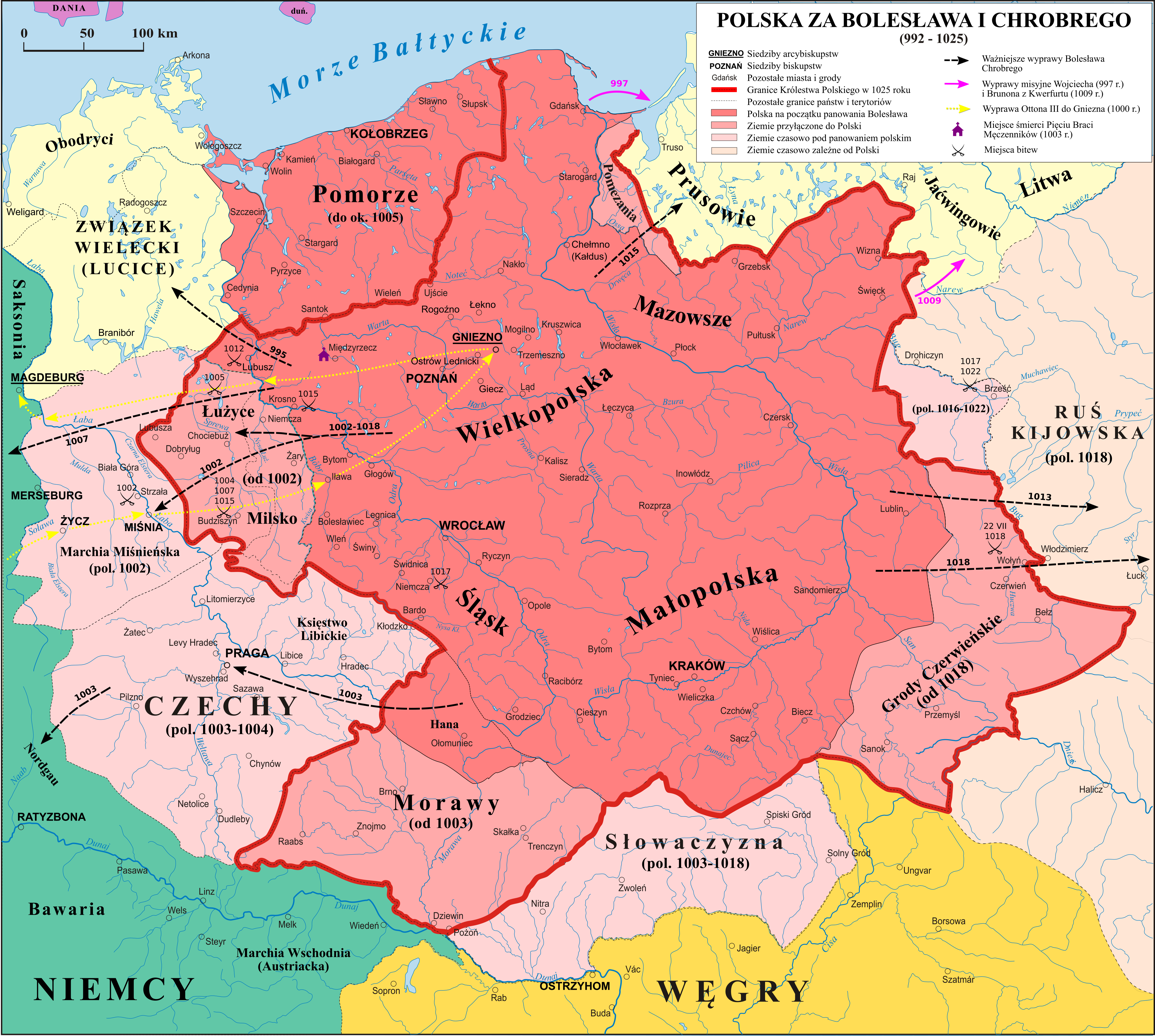
Poland during Piast dynasty

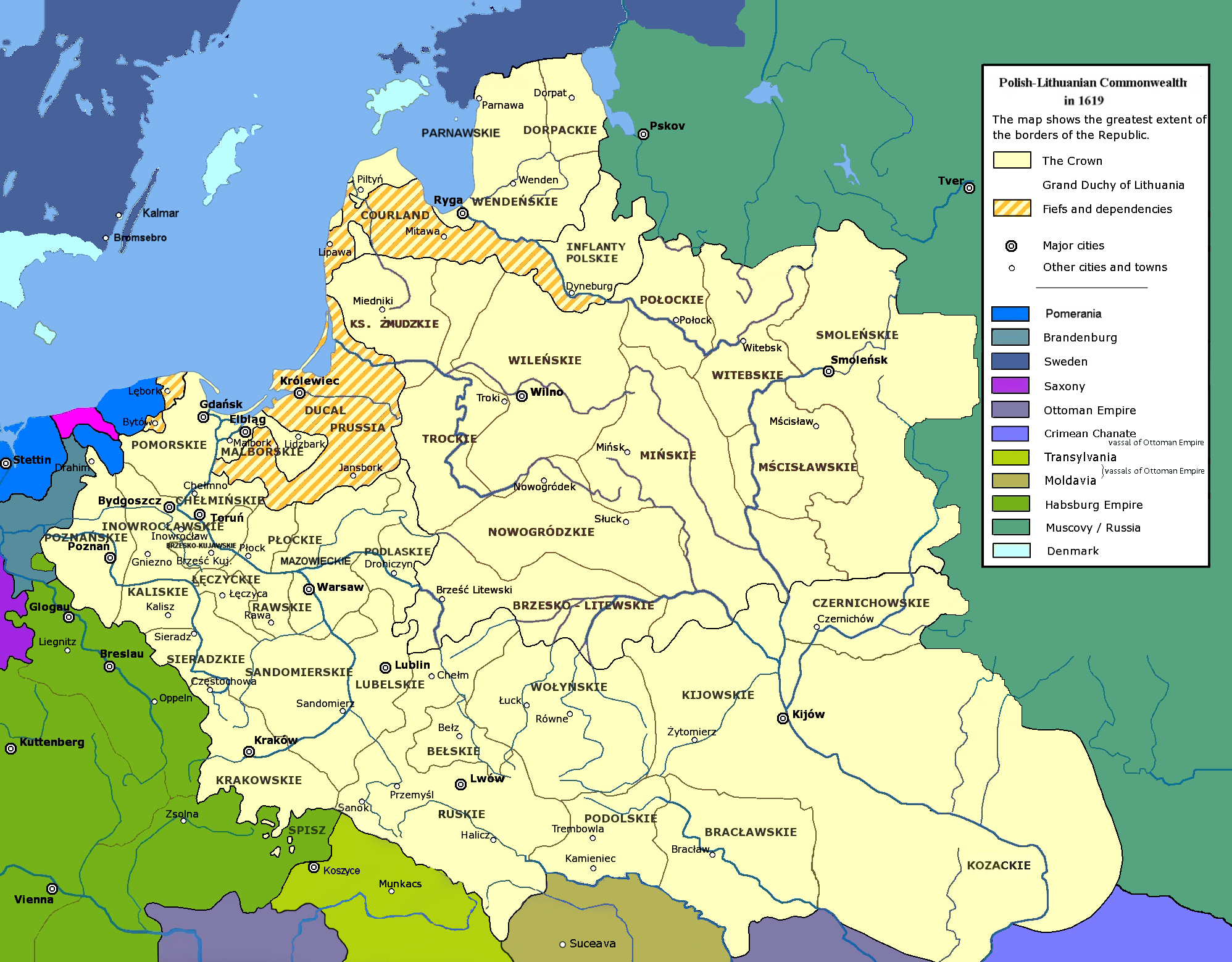
The Polish–Lithuanian Commonwealth at its greatest extent in 1619

Alexander Jagiellon coat of arms with Ruthenian lion as Russiae lion

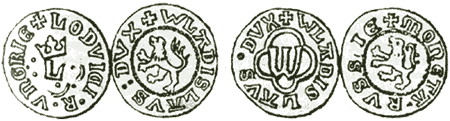
Coins of Wladyslaw Opolczyk (Russiae moneta with Ruthenian lion)

Polish–Ukrainian relations can be traced to the 9th-10th centuries between Kingdom of Poland and Ruthenia (so called "Kievan Rus") and later in the Polish–Lithuanian Commonwealth and the often turbulent relations between that state and the mostly polonized nobility (szlachta) and the Cossacks. And even further into the 13th-14th centuries when the Kingdom of Poland and the Ruthenian Kingdom maintained close ties. The Khmelnytsky Uprising in 1648 ended the Polish Catholic szlachta′s domination over the Ukrainian Orthodox population.

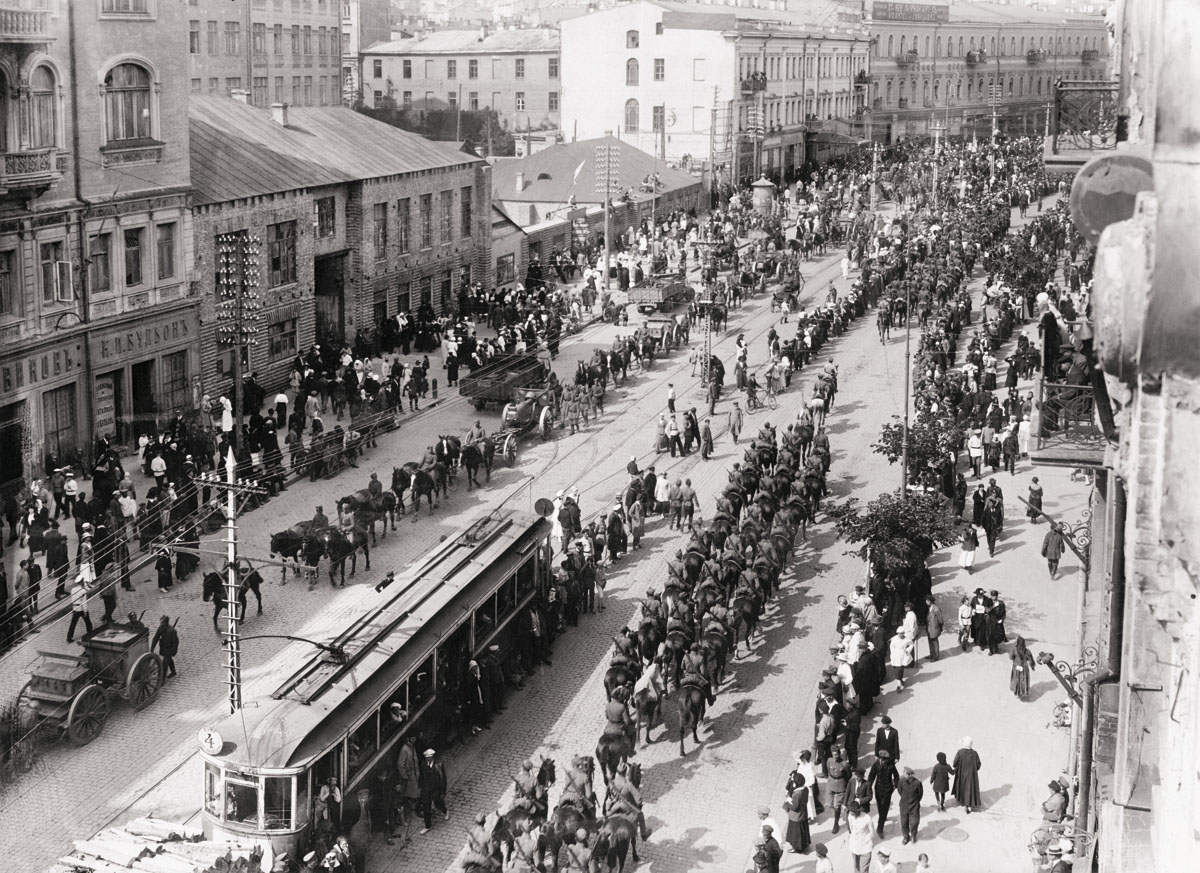
Polish–Ukrainian military parade in Kyiv in 1920 after the capture of the city by allied Polish and Ukrainian forces from the Soviets

The next stage would be the relations in the years 1918–1920, in the aftermath of World War I, which saw both the Polish–Ukrainian War and the Polish–Ukrainian alliance. The interwar period would eventually see independent Poland while the Ukrainians had no state of their own, being divided between Poland and the Soviet Union. This situation led to a deterioration in Polish−Ukrainian relations and it resulted in a flare-up of ethnic tensions both during and immediately after World War II (with the massacres of Poles in Volhynia and Operation Vistula being the most infamous events).

While this left the Polish–Ukrainian relations in the mid-20th century in a relatively poor state, there was little meaningful and independent diplomacy and contact between the Polish People's Republic (Poland) and the Ukrainian Soviet Socialist Republic (Ukraine). The situation changed significantly with the fall of communism, when both Poland and Ukraine became fully independent and could once again decide on foreign policies of their own.

In the emigre community however, the very influential Paris-based magazine Kultura, which was smuggled into Poland and read widely, advocated for a rapprochement with Ukraine, Belarus, and Lithuania.

=== Modern era ===
==== 1989–2004 ====
In September 1989, shortly after the democratic forces led by Solidarity came to power in Warsaw, a group of Polish parliamentarians arrived in Kyiv for the constituent congress of the People's Movement of Ukraine. They supported the aspirations of the national democratic forces of Ukraine. It was then that the foundations of a new model of Polish–Ukrainian relations were laid.

Progress in Polish–Ukrainian relations was evidenced by the decision of the Polish Senate of July 27, 1990 on the proclamation of Ukraine on July 16, 1990, the Declaration of State Sovereignty. This document, in particular, states: "Poles, who consider freedom and independence of the Fatherland as their core values, fully understand the turning point in the history of Ukraine—a neighbor with whom they want to live as equal and close peoples, as well as develop cooperation in everything."

On August 3, 1990, the Senate of the Republic of Poland adopted a special statement in which it gave a political and moral assessment of the Vistula action. The statement stated that “the communist authorities, having begun to liquidate units of the Ukrainian Insurgent Army, at the same time forcibly relocated persons, mainly of Ukrainian nationality. Within three months, about 150,000 people, deprived of their property, houses and shrines, were evicted from various places. For many years they were not allowed to return, and then it was difficult for them to return. The Senate of the Republic of Poland condemns the action "Vistula", typical of totalitarian regimes, and will try to compensate for the insults arising from it. "

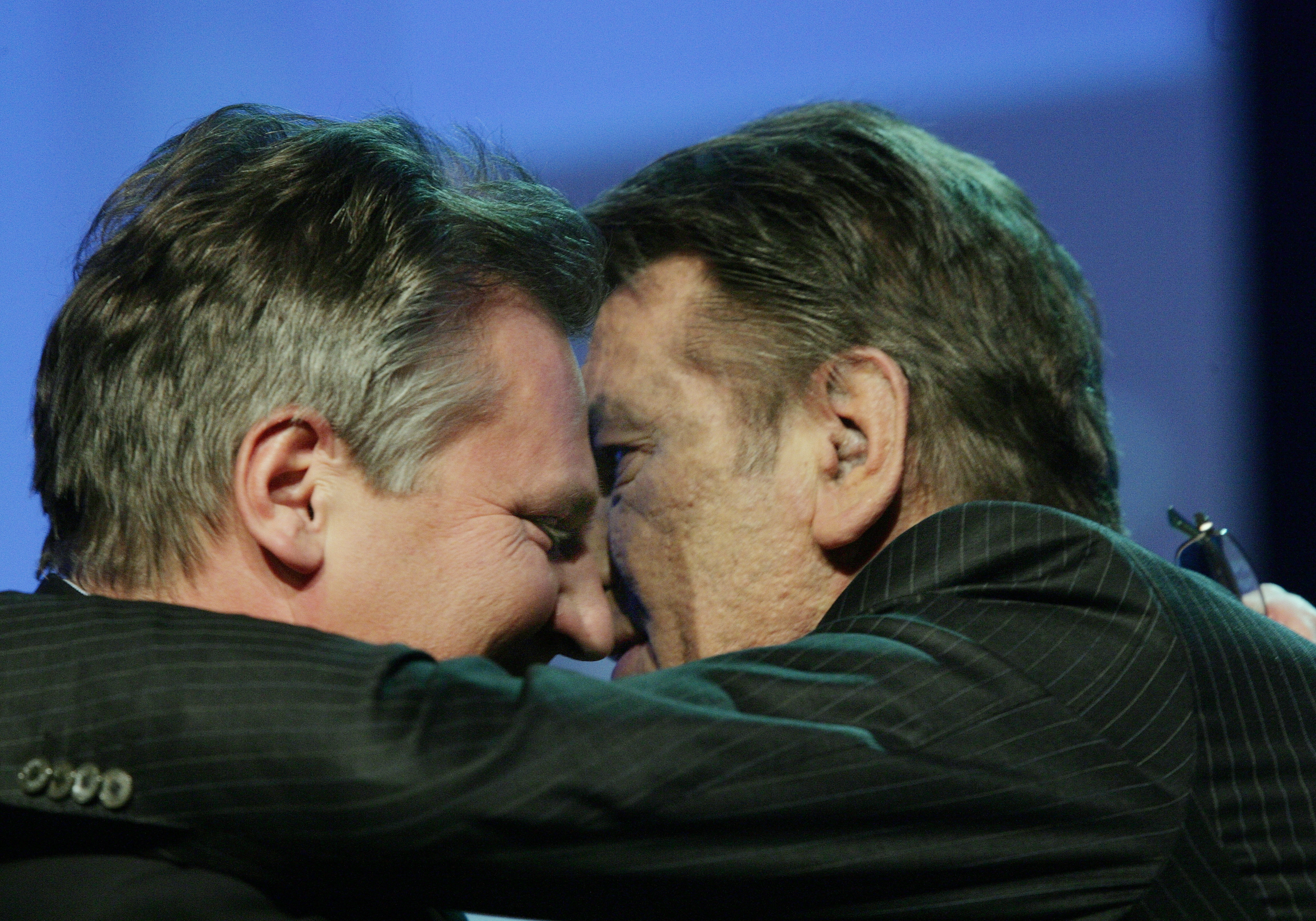
Viktor Yushchenko (R), President of Ukraine, kisses Aleksander Kwaśniewski, President of Poland, Davos, 2005

On October 13, 1990 Poland and Ukraine agreed to the "Declaration on the foundations and general directions in the development of Polish–Ukrainian relations". Article 3 of this declaration said that neither country has any territorial claims against the other, and will not bring any in the future. Both countries promised to respect the rights of national minorities on their territories and to improve the situation of minorities in their countries.

Following the failed Soviet coup attempt, Ukraine declared independence on August 24, 1991. A day after the referendum, on December 2, 1991, the Republic of Poland was the first foreign country to recognize Ukraine's state independence. Diplomatic relations were established between the two countries on January 8, 1992.

On May 18–19, 1992, the first official visit of the President of Ukraine Leonid Kravchuk to the Republic of Poland took place, during which an interstate Treaty on Good-Neighborliness, Friendly Relations and Cooperation was signed, in which it was stated that the countries structures based on the Final Act of the Conference on Security and Cooperation in Europe, the Paris Charter for a New Europe, "will take and support measures aimed at preserving and developing positive traditions of common heritage, as well as overcoming prejudices and negative stereotypes between the two nations.

On May 24–25, 1993, the President of Poland Lech Wałęsa paid an official visit to Ukraine, one of the main results of which was the establishment of the Advisory Committee of the Presidents of Ukraine and the Republic of Poland. In February of the same year, an agreement on military cooperation was signed between the Ministry of Defence of Ukraine and the Ministry of National Defence of Poland, which was supplemented in a number of protocols in the following years.

In March 1994, the Declaration of the Ministers of Foreign Affairs of Ukraine and Poland on the Principles of Ukrainian-Polish Partnership was signed, in which the Ministers of Foreign Affairs for the first time at the interstate level declared the strategic importance of Ukrainian-Polish relations and pledged to develop them in the future.

Poland has agreed to help Ukraine integrate into Western European organizations, primarily NATO and the EU. As Jerzy Kozakiewicz, the first Ambassador of the Republic of Poland to Ukraine, noted in early 1996, "one of the most important tasks of Polish foreign policy is to spread and strengthen various bilateral instruments in our bilateral relations with Ukraine that would facilitate its path to European institutions." The representative of the Ministry of Foreign Affairs of Ukraine figuratively defined the main direction of cooperation with Poland: "For Ukraine, the way through Moscow leads to Siberia, and through Warsaw, to Paris."

A further important step in creating an organizational infrastructure for bilateral dialogue was the interstate "Agreement between the Government of Ukraine and the Government of the Republic of Poland on Cooperation concerning the Protection and Return of Cultural Property Lost and Illegally Displaced during World War II" dated 25 June 1996, which defined and specified the subject and scope of mutual cooperation between the parties. In particular, article 2 of the Agreement declares: "In order to protect, preserve, search for, and return cultural property associated with the culture and history of the Parties, recognized as lost or illegally moved to the territory of the other Party, the Parties shall establish an Intergovernmental Ukrainian-Polish Commission [for the Protection and Return of Cultural Property Lost and Illegally Displaced during World War II]."

After the visits of Leonid Kuchma to Warsaw on June 25–27, 1996 and the newly elected President of Poland Aleksander Kwaśniewski to Kyiv on May 20–22, 1997, Ukrainian–Polish relations reached the level of a strategic partnership. On May 21, the two heads of state signed a joint informal Declaration of Harmony and Unity.

The purposeful development of Polish–Ukrainian political cooperation allowed Ukraine to enlist the support of Poland in establishing the first dialogue with the United States and the leading states of Europe. The National Security Strategy of Poland declares Warsaw's support for Ukraine's Euro-Atlantic aspirations, in particular, as part of the continuation of the "open door" policy to NATO. In addition, it is emphasized that Polish–Ukrainian cooperation should help consolidate Ukraine's important role in European security policy.

During the official visit of the Minister of Foreign Affairs Bronisław Geremek to Ukraine on September 15–16, 1998, the parties agreed to intensify joint actions in order to avoid possible negative consequences of EU enlargement. Bronisław Geremek also noted that his country will continue to support Ukraine's integration aspirations, in particular in gaining the status of an associate member of the EU. At the end of March 1999, the first meeting of the Ukrainian-Polish Conference on European Integration took place in Warsaw.

Although some Ukrainian officials, scholars and political scientists have expressed concern that Poland will turn away from Ukraine after it becomes a member of NATO, support for Ukraine's cooperation and rapprochement with NATO remains a characteristic feature of the Polish state's "Ukrainian policy." This is due to Poland's vision of its national interests in the context of the basic contours of European security and to the desire to play an important role in a renewed Alliance that adapts to modern conditions.

Poland supports Ukraine's European integration for similar reasons. An independent and strong, and most importantly, friendly, Ukraine is an important instrument of Polish Eastern European policy since it significantly counterbalances the Russian Federation's influence and ambition relative to Poland. Speaking in the Sejm of the Republic of Poland on March 5, 1998, B. Geremek had every reason to say that "independent Ukraine is of key strategic importance both for Poland and its security, and for stability in the entire region. Maintaining privileged relations with Ukraine contributes to strengthening European security."

==== 2004–2014 ====
Support for Ukrainian sovereignty has become an important component of Polish foreign policy. Poland strongly supported the peaceful and democratic resolution of the 2004 Orange Revolution in Ukraine, and has backed NATO-Ukraine cooperation (such as the Lithuanian–Polish–Ukrainian Brigade), as well as Ukraine's efforts to join the European Union.

Poland's accession to the European Union has created a new reality for Ukraine. For the first time, a member country has lobbied for Ukraine's course towards EU, as well as NATO, membership. At the same time, in the conditions of post-orange development there was a need for significant modernization of the structure and filling of the political dialogue between Ukraine and Poland. For example, cooperation aimed at achieving Ukraine's compliance with the first of the Copenhagen criteria for EU membership ("political" criterion): ensuring the stability of democratic institutions, protection of human rights and the rule of law has become essential. 2005 was declared the Year of Ukraine in the Republic of Poland and inaugurated in Warsaw in April 2005 with the participation of President of Ukraine Viktor Yushchenko. Ukraine and Poland have signed agreements on academic recognition of documents on education and scientific degrees and on cooperation in the field of informatization. Trade, economic, scientific and technical ties between Ukraine and Poland have expanded. The Republic of Poland has become Ukraine's most important economic partner in Central Europe. Ukraine is the second largest country to which Polish exports went. As of 2008, the joint Ukrainian–Polish cooperation program in the field of science and technology included more than 150 joint research projects.

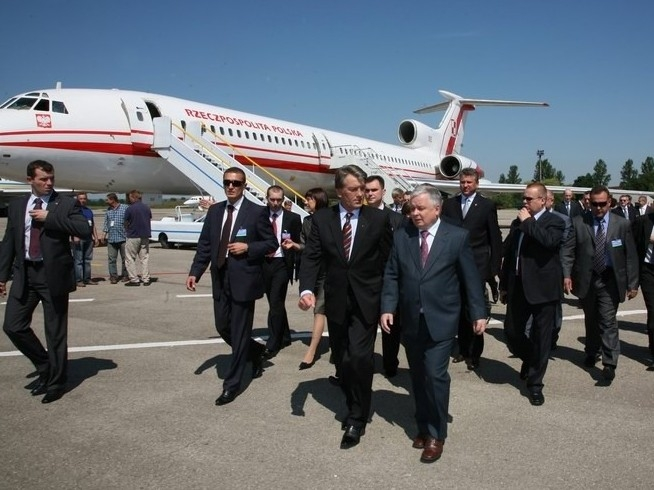
President of Poland Lech Kaczyński during his visit to Kyiv, 2007

Cross-border cooperation has developed within the framework of the Karpaty and Bug Euroregions established in the mid-1990s. At the same time, almost all areas of bilateral relations faced problems related to Poland's entry into the Schengen Area from the end of 2007, which led to new procedures and rules for crossing the Ukrainian-Polish border and, accordingly, created additional difficulties for developing and optimizing cooperation between the two states.

An important focus of the development of bilateral relations was Poland's initiation of the activation of the Eastern vector in EU policy. The idea of strengthening the eastern vector of the European Neighborhood Policy (ENP) became one of the priorities of Poland's foreign policy in 2008, which positioned itself as a leader in this direction. Polish Foreign Minister Radoslaw Sikorski, presenting the country's foreign policy for 2008 in the Sejm on May 7, 2008, declared the idea: "Poland should continue to specialize in developing a common foreign policy towards the East." At the same time, Poland has sought and continues to seek to strengthen its position in the EU, primarily by strengthening its role in Eastern Europe. Jan Kalicki, director of the Center for Eastern European Studies at the University of Warsaw, confirmed this idea in an interview with Polish Radio: "I want to emphasize that the strength of Poland's position in the European Union depends on the support and strength we have in the East." The Polish Foreign Minister stressed that his country intends to implement the ENP in the east with its partners—the Czech Republic, Slovakia, Hungary, Estonia, Lithuania, Latvia, Romania and Bulgaria, as well as with Sweden. At the European Council in March 2008, Poland supported the proposal to create a Union for the Mediterranean and thus counted on the support of the EU to separate the eastern direction of the ENP.

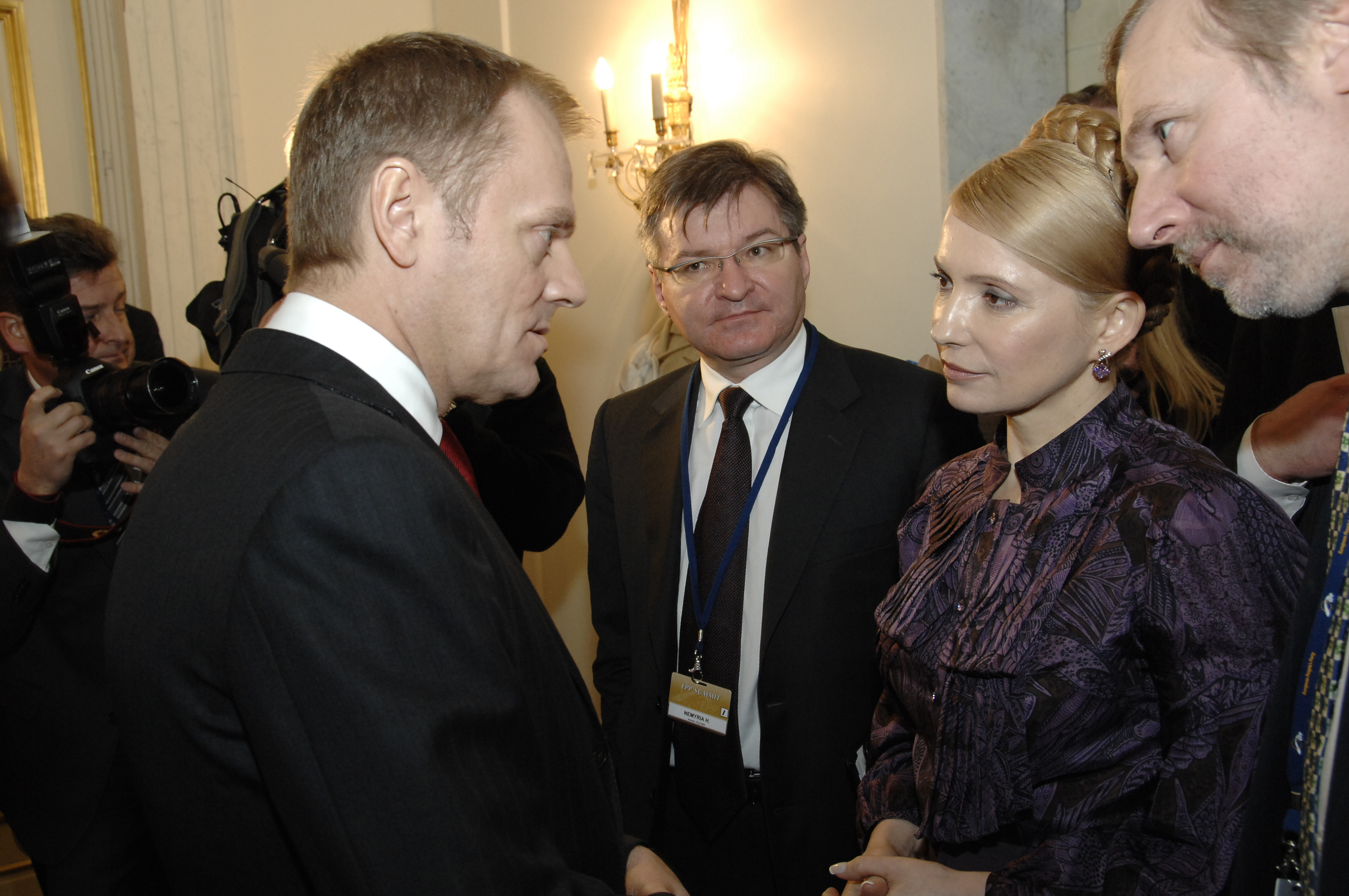
Conversation between Ukrainian Prime Minister Yulia Tymoshenko and Polish Prime Minister Donald Tusk, 2009

At the same time, these intentions of Poland were realized and reflected in the joint Polish-Swedish proposal "Eastern Partnership" of May 23, 2008. It was presented and approved at the meeting of the EU General Policy Council and the Council on Foreign Relations on May 26, 2008. in Brussels and has become the flagship initiative of the entire EU. On 26 May 2008, during a meeting of EU Foreign Ministers in Brussels, Poland and Sweden presented a joint proposal to deepen the EU's Eastern policy, known as the EU's Eastern Partnership (EU). The JV initiative is addressed to six countries: direct addressees – Ukraine, Moldova, Georgia, Azerbaijan and Armenia, as well as technical and expert cooperation with Belarus. A JV is a set of specific tools that do not guarantee the prospect of EU membership. At the same time, through this toolkit it provides an opportunity to open EU channels for the implementation of integration projects in certain countries. According to many politicians and researchers, the JV can be a useful mechanism that will accelerate the political and economic modernization of the Eastern partners. Thus, since Poland's accession to the EU, relations have been filled with new content, and its role as a lawyer and lobbyist for Ukraine's European integration and Euro-Atlantic course has been strengthened. This was manifested, on the one hand, in support of Ukraine's ideas, and on the other – in the development and implementation of a specific program of EU cooperation with Eastern Europe. First of all, we are talking about the neighborhood program and especially about the Eastern Partnership project. It is the Polish–Swedish initiative aimed at real acceleration of the process of Ukraine's accession (along with other Eastern European countries) to EU integration.

Poland and Ukraine were the host countries of the UEFA Euro 2012.

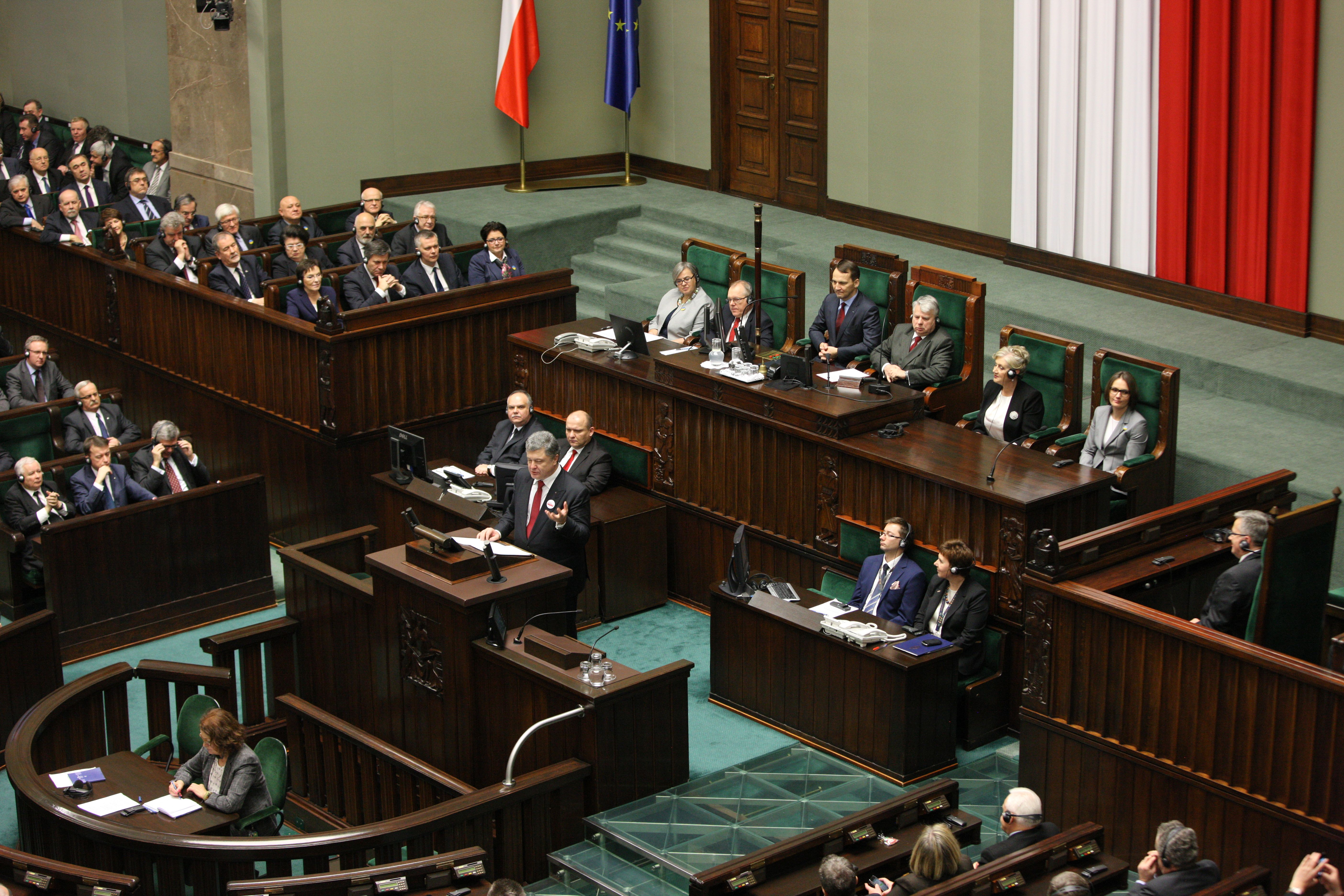
President of Ukraine Petro Poroshenko in the Polish Sejm, 2014

Poland has been an avid supporter of Ukraine throughout the tumultuous period of the Euromaidan and the annexation of Crimea by the Russian Federation. The Polish government has campaigned for Ukraine in the European Union and is a supporter of sanctions against Russia for its actions in Ukraine. Poland has declared that they will never recognize the annexation of Crimea by Russia. In 2014, Poland's ex-foreign minister Radoslaw Sikorski alleged that in 2008, Russian President Vladimir Putin proposed to then Polish Prime Minister Donald Tusk in the division of Ukraine between Poland and Russia. Sikorski later stated that some words had been over-interpreted, and that Poland did not take part in annexations. Especially during this period, Poland took a large number of Ukrainian refugees.

==== 2015–2021 ====
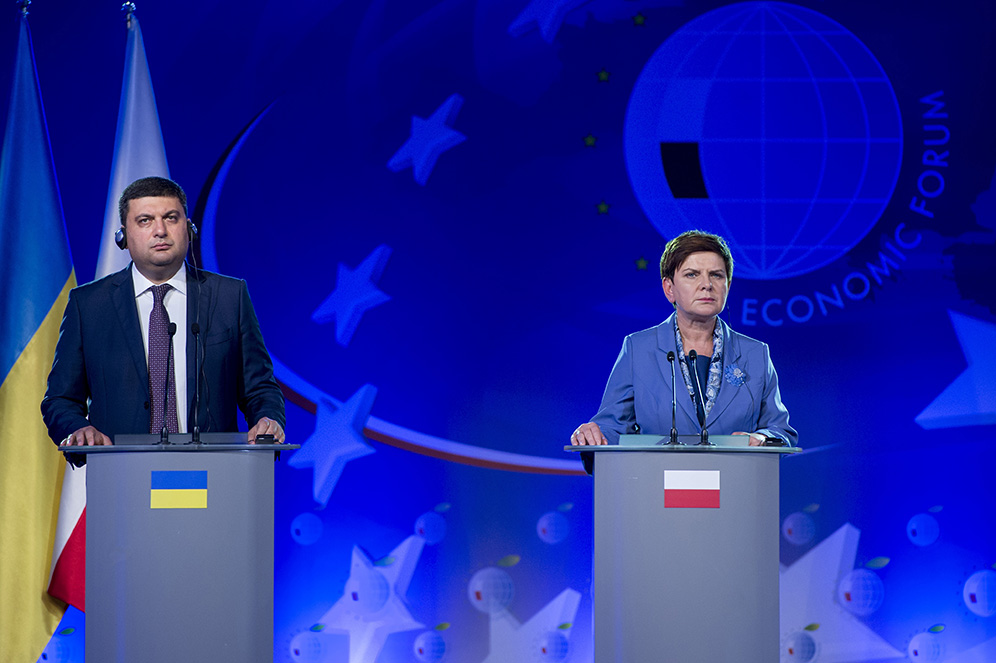
Ukrainian Prime Minister Volodymyr Groysman and Polish Prime Minister Beata Szydło during meeting in Krynica-Zdrój, 2016

Different interpretations of bitter events regarding Poles and Ukrainians during World War II have led to some tensions between the nations since 2015.

Historical issues regarding the Ukrainian Insurgent Army (UPA) and their massacres of Poles in Volhynia and Eastern Galicia remain a contested topic. Ukrainian memory laws (the Ukrainian decommunization laws) passed in 2015, honoring UPA, related organizations and its members, were criticized in Poland. In turn, in July 2016, the Polish Sejm passed a resolution, authored by the Law and Justice party, making July 11 a National Day of Remembrance of Victims of Genocide, noting that over 100,000 Polish citizens were killed during a coordinated attack by the UPA. Ukrainian President Petro Poroshenko voiced regrets about the decision, arguing that it can lead to "political speculation". In response, Ukrainian MP Oleksii Musii drafted a resolution declaring March 24 "Memorial Day of the Victims of Polish state genocide against Ukrainians in 1919–1951". The Marshal of the Polish Senate Stanislaw Karczewski condemned the motion.

In 2016, a special screening of the Polish film Volhynia by the Polish Institute in Kyiv for Ukrainian MPs was postponed due to concerns that it may disrupt public order, on recommendations from the Ukrainian foreign ministry.

In April 2017, the Ukrainian Institute of National Remembrance forbade the exhumation of Polish victims of the 1943 massacres of Poles in Volhynia and Eastern Galicia as part of the broader action of halting the legalization of Polish memorial sites in Ukraine, in a retaliation for the dismantling of a monument to UPA soldiers in Hruszowice, Poland.

Polish President Andrzej Duda expressed his concerns with the appointment to high Ukrainian offices of people expressing nationalistic anti-Polish views. The Ukrainian foreign ministry stated that there is no general anti-Polish sentiment in Ukraine.

In 2018, novelized Article 2a of the Polish Act on the Institute of National Remembrance, which from then on discusses the "crimes of Ukrainian nationalists and members of Ukrainian organizations collaborating with the Third German Reich", again caused criticism from the Ukrainian side. In Ukraine, the Amendment has been called "the Anti-Banderovite Law".

In August 2019, President Volodymyr Zelenskyy promised to lift the moratorium on exhuming Polish mass graves in Ukraine after the previous Ukrainian government banned the Polish side from carrying out any exhumations of Polish victims of the UPA-perpetrated Volhynian massacres.

Logo of Lublin Triangle

On 28 July 2020, Poland, Ukraine and Lithuania entered into a new international collaboration format known as the "Lublin Triangle". It was signed in the city of Lublin, Poland, by the Foreign Ministers of Poland, Ukraine and Lithuania: Jacek Czaputowicz, Dmytro Kuleba and Linas Antanas Linkevičius, respectively. The Ukrainian foreign minister said that the new format "will be an important element in the development and strengthening of Central Europe, but also in strengthening Ukraine as a full member of the European and Euro-Atlantic family." The cooperation will not only concern defence issues but will also involve bolstering economic cooperation, trade, and tourism between the three countries. A joint declaration on the creation of the Lublin Triangle stressed the importance of intensifying the cooperation between the EU, NATO, and the Eastern Partnership and paying special attention to the development of the Three Seas Initiative.

In August 2021, during the COVID-19 pandemic, Poland provided Ukraine with 650,000 COVID-19 vaccines and over 129 tons of medical equipment, including oxygen concentrators, ventilators, and protective equipment. In December 2021, Poland donated a further 300,000 COVID-19 vaccines to Ukraine.

==== 2022–2025 ====
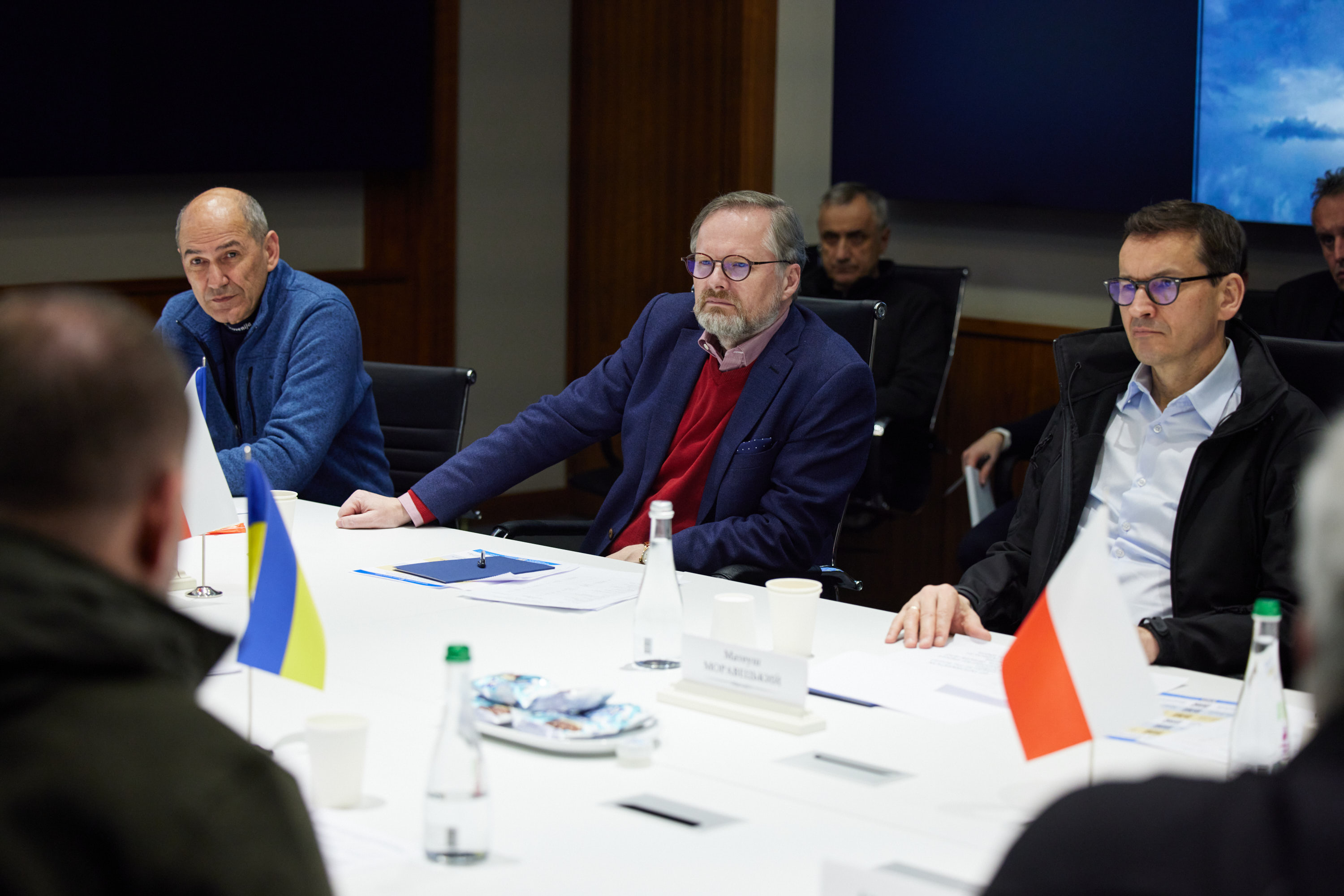
Prime Ministers of Poland, Czech Republic, and Slovenia during their visit to Kyiv, 2022

In response to the Russian military buildup near Ukraine, on 31 January 2022, Poland announced the decision to supply Ukraine with weapons, ammunition, as well as humanitarian aid, given the threat of a Russian invasion of Ukraine. On 17 February 2022, the British–Polish–Ukrainian trilateral pact was announced. On 23 February 2022, in response to Russia's escalation of tensions and recognition of the separatist Donetsk People's Republic and Luhansk People's Republic in Russian-occupied eastern Ukraine, Polish President Andrzej Duda visited Kyiv along with the President of Lithuania, and they jointly declared solidarity and support for Ukraine and called for international sanctions against Russia.

On 24 February 2022, the day of the Russian invasion of Ukraine, the Sejm (Polish parliament) adopted by acclamation a resolution condemning the Russian invasion. Poland immediately set up nine reception points to receive civilian refugees from Ukraine. During the war in 2022, Poland became Ukraine's second-largest weapons supplier, with the weapons' total value exceeding $1.6 billion (as of 24 May 2022). Provided weapons include missiles, grenade launchers, rifles, drones, tanks, RPGs, and ammunition. Continued Polish support for Ukraine in early 2022 has led to significant improvement in Polish-Ukraine relations.

On 15 March 2022, Polish Prime Minister Mateusz Morawiecki travelled by train to Kyiv alongside Polish Deputy Prime Minister Jarosław Kaczyński, Czech Prime Minister Petr Fiala, and Slovenian Prime Minister Janez Janša. This was the first visit to Ukraine by foreign leaders since the beginning of Russia's full-scale invasion on 24 February 2022. Morawiecki expressed Poland's support for Ukraine, stating that "It is here that freedom fights against the world of tyranny; it is here that the future of us all hangs in the balance," while Zelenskiy described the visit as a big and brave step, emphasizing that "At a time when many countries have ordered their embassies closed or greatly reduced their diplomatic presence, these leaders of independent European states show that they had no fear."

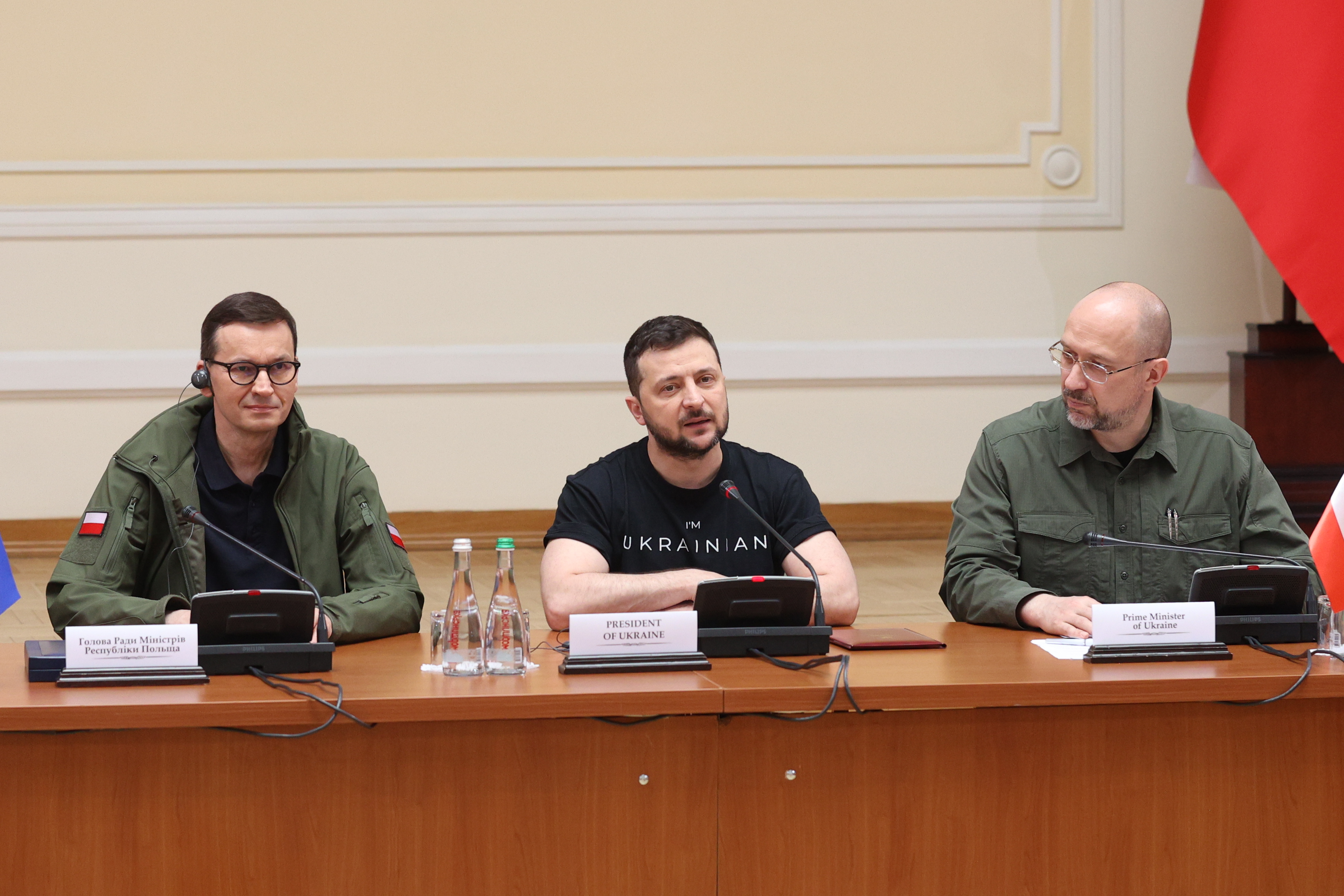
Polish Prime Minister Morawiecki, Ukrainian President Volodymyr Zelenskyy and Ukrainian Prime Minister Denys Shmyhal during intergovernmental consultations in Kyiv, 2022

On 1 June 2022, the first bilateral intergovernmental consultations took place in Kyiv.

On 20 September 2023, Polish Prime Minister Mateusz Morawiecki announced that Poland would not supply weapons to Ukraine other than those previously agreed, amid tensions between the two countries over the Polish import ban on Ukrainian grain after cheap Ukrainian grain, which was meant to be exported through Poland, ended up being sold in Polish markets. After Ukrainian President Volodymyr Zelenskyy criticised Poland in his speech in the United Nations’ General Assembly, saying "some of our friends in Europe" were making "political theater" out of grain, Morawiecki warned President Zelenskyy to never “insult Poles again."

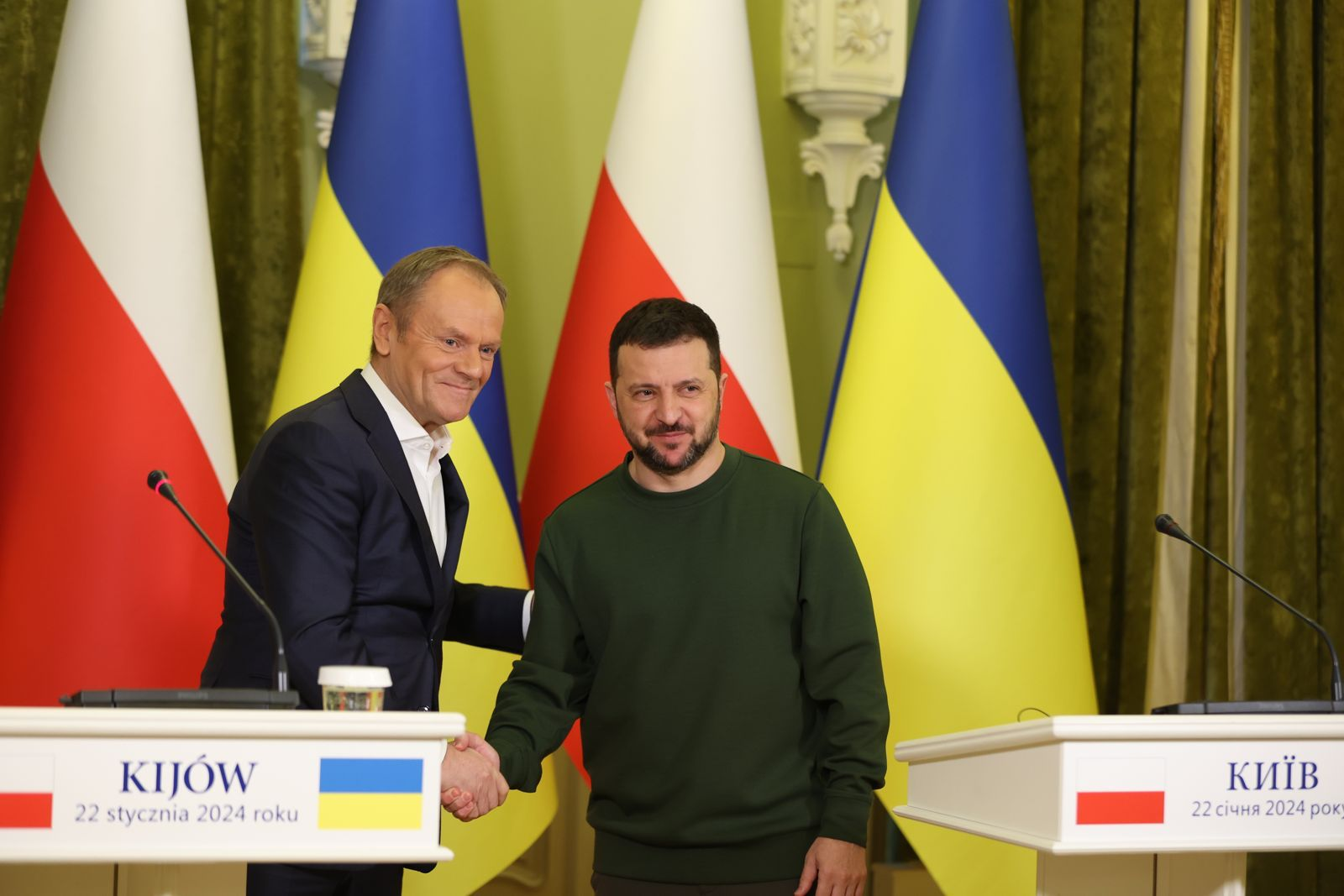
Polish Prime Minister Donald Tusk with Ukrainian President Volodymyr Zelenskyy in Kyiv, 22 January 2024

On 6 November 2023, several dozen owners of Polish transport companies blocked three major Poland–Ukraine border crossings to protest claimed unfair competition from Ukrainian transport companies. A temporary wartime EU agreement allowed Ukrainian trucks to deliver and collect to and from the EU without the usual permits. On 19 November, about 3,000 mostly Ukrainian trucks were stuck, parked up to 30 kilometres (19 mi) from the crossings. Waiting time for trucks to cross the border was about one week. On 27 November, the blockade was extended to a fourth crossing. By February 2024, the blockade had expanded to all major crossings, including railways, and protestors had spilt some grain onto the ground from train transport. The blockade had become a crisis. On 27 February 2024, about 10,000 farmers marched in Warsaw demanding a ban on food imports from Ukraine.

In April 2024, the Polish government offered to repatriate Ukrainian men of military age living in Poland to Ukraine to be drafted into the Ukrainian army. It is estimated that there are about 300–400,000 Ukrainian men living in Poland.

In 2025, former Polish President Andrzej Duda claimed that Ukraine wanted to drag Poland into the war, stating that Zelenskyy had asked him to admit a Russian missile was behind the 2022 explosion.

==== 2026–present ====
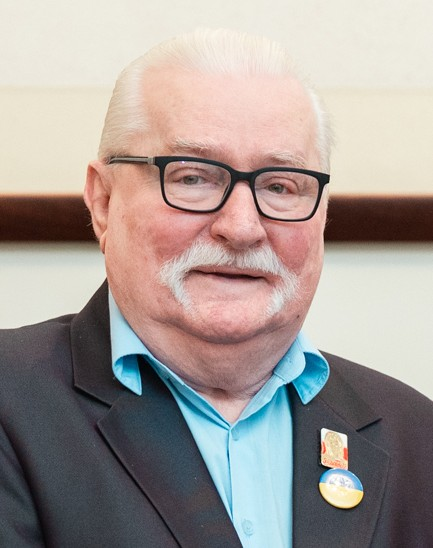
Symbolic Solidarity figure and former Polish president Lech Wałęsa, previously a supporter of Zelenskyy, tore a lapel pin of the Ukrainian flag (pictured) from his chest publicly upon hearing of the naming of the unit "Heroes of the UPA"

Since May 2026, relations between the two countries have deteriorated significantly. The reburial and state funeral of Andriy Melnyk, whose remains were reburied with full state honors on 25 May 2026, at the National Military Memorial Cemetery near Kyiv, precipitated this. Melnyk was a Nazi collaborator and faction leader in the Organization of Ukrainian Nationalists; however, the New York Times claims his culpability in the ethnic cleansing of Polish people is debated among historians. Melnyk's reburial also caused diplomatic outcries in Israel and from Yad Vashem due to his co-responsibility for pogroms of Jews in Ukraine. It was also reported by the head of the Ukrainian Institute of National Remembrance that a similar honoring and reburial for controversial figure Stepan Bandera, and a figure regarded by many Poles as highly polarizing, was not being ruled out, with his family agreeing that his remains should eventually be moved from Munich.

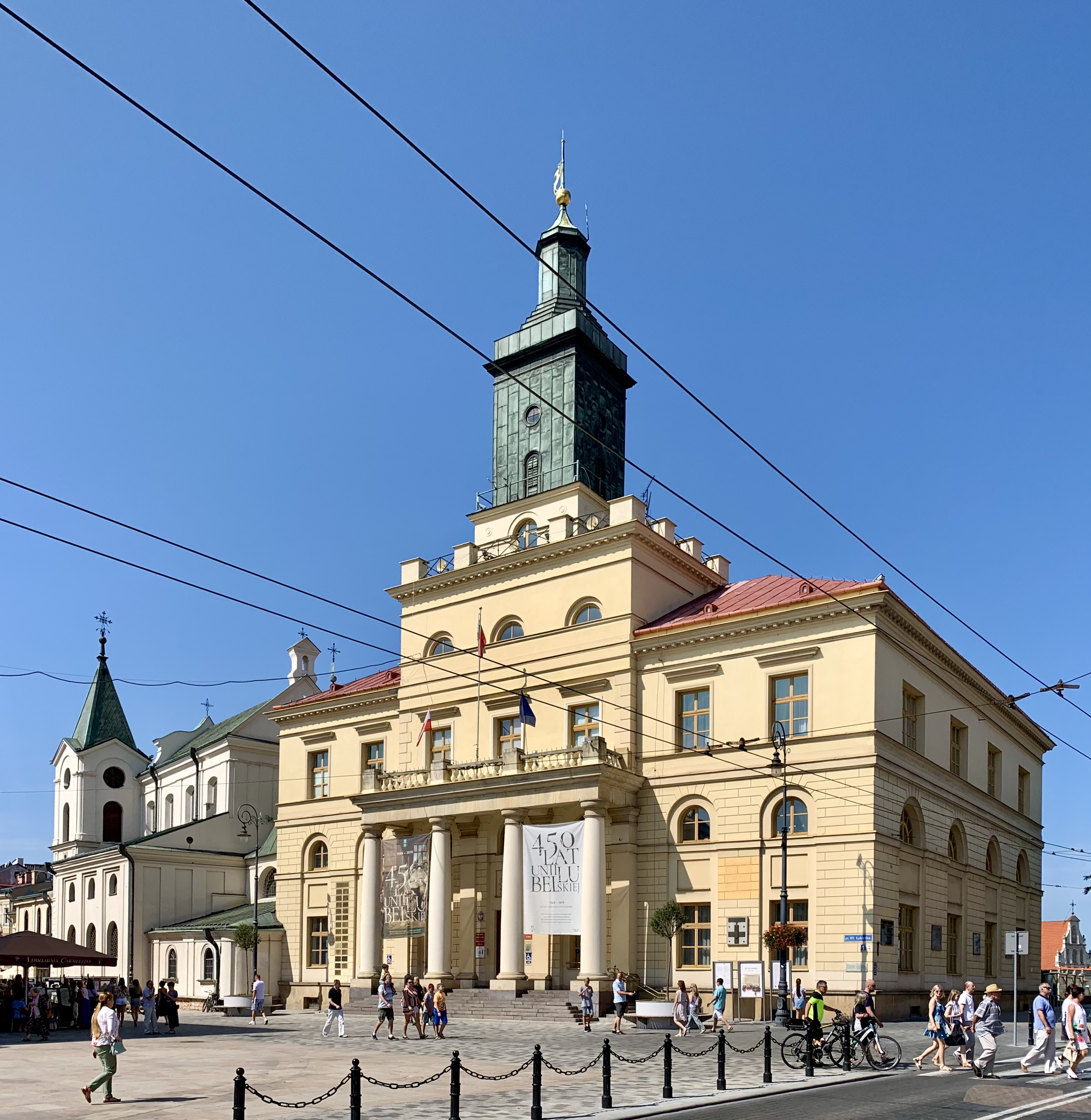
The Lublin New Town Hall removed a Ukrainian flag following Zelenskyy's decree

Relations worsened following an incident on 27 May 2026, where Ukrainian president Volodymyr Zelenskyy named an elite commando unit of the Ukrainian military "Heroes of the Ukrainian Insurgent Army", after a Nazi collaborationist guerrilla formation which is widely seen in Poland as having played a leading role in the killing of about 100,000 Polish civilians in the massacres of Poles in Volhynia and Eastern Galicia, declared by the Polish parliament in 2025 as a genocide while the common Ukrainian term is the "Volhynia tragedy". The move was criticized widely in Poland and across the political spectrum, with former Prime Minister Leszek Miller calling it "spitting in the face of Poles" and urging President Karol Nawrocki to strip Zelenskyy of the Order of the White Eagle. President Nawrocki criticized Zelenskyy's move "in the harshest terms" and announced that the 8th June meeting of the Chapter of the Order of the White Eagle would place stripping Zelenskyy of the order at the top of its agenda.

Mayor of Lviv, Ukraine, Andriy Sadovyi, stated that he'd "like to see how [Nawrocki would] come to collect [the order] from the Ukrainian military considering he had not dared to cross the [Ukrainian] border thus far". Sadovyi's statement was seen as provocative in Poland. Nawrocki questioned Poland's continued support for Ukraine's membership in the European Union and NATO, saying that Ukraine's actions were "unbecoming of the broader European family", escalating the dispute from historical to strategic ramifications. Deputy Foreign Minister Marcin Bosacki summoned the Ukrainian ambassador to lodge a formal protest. Former Polish ambassador to Ukraine, Bartosz Cichocki, returned a state honour given to him previously by Zelenskyy as a sign of his protest against the Ukrainian move. The deputy speaker of the Sejm, Krzysztof Bosak, stated that Ukraine should be blocked from EU candidacy and that the Polish government should stop using Starlink services used by the Ukrainian armed forces.

Other figures across the political spectrum criticized the move, including Prime Minister Donald Tusk, Minister of National Defence Władysław Kosiniak-Kamysz, and government coalition partner Robert Biedroń. Former leading figure of Solidarity and president of Poland (1990–1995), Lech Wałęsa, who had previously been a strong supporter of Ukraine and Zelenskyy, tore a lapel pin of the Ukrainian flag from his chest publicly on stage upon hearing of the news. The Polish city of Lublin removed the Ukrainian flag from its town hall. Some political scientists in Poland observed a social shift toward anti-Ukrainian sentiment becoming more widely accepted not only in far-right circles but unanimously across the political spectrum, with the ruling centrist liberal-conservative Civic Coalition under Prime Minister Tusk being seen as pivoting from its earlier pro-Ukrainian stance and the opposition parties also capitalizing on the shift in attitudes.

Nawrocki's reaction and his proposal to strip Zelenskyy of the Order of the White Eagle was largely ascribed to the spread of the news about the Ukrainian unit's naming on social media. The online media of Poles and Ukrainians showed a split opinion, with Res Futura Data House stating that according to its analysis, 97.4% of Polish online social media users supported Nawrocki's action in stripping the order from Zelenskyy and that 98% of Ukrainian online social media users supported Zelenskyy's use of the name of the Ukrainian Insurgent Army.

In early June, Polish authorities supported a proposal to revoke access to temporary EU protection for Ukrainian fighting-age men, allowing for their repatriation to Ukraine for conscription. This was presented as a gesture to improve relations with Ukrainian authorities, who favour repatriations to compensate for manpower shortages in soldiers fighting against the Russian invasion.

This was seen as the worst diplomatic crisis between Poland and Ukraine since 2017, when the chief of the Ukrainian Institute of National Remembrance, Volodymyr Viatrovych, prohibited the exhumation of Polish civilian victims of the Insurgent Army from Ukrainian soil under the condition that Poland must rebuild the monument to the Insurgent Army in Hruszowice, a decision that Ukraine reversed in 2023, when relations improved through to 2026, particularly in the final years of former President Andrzej Duda's term.

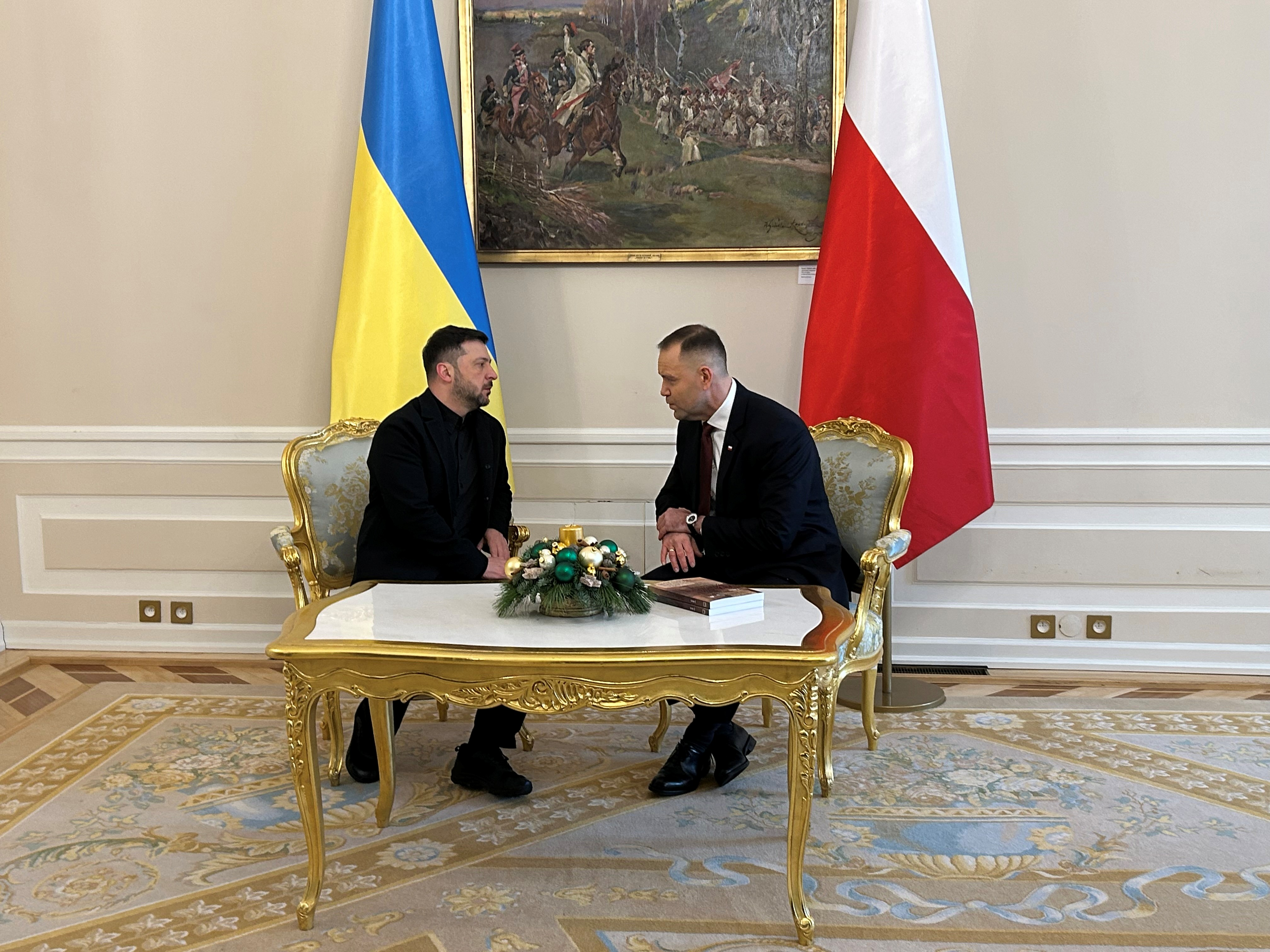
Polish and Ukrainian presidents Karol Nawrocki and Volodymyr Zelenskyy photographed during a bilateral meeting in December 2025

On 19 June, Nawrocki officially revoked Zelenskyy's state decoration, as previously considered by Nawrocki during the initial fallout of the Ukrainian president's decision to name a military unit "Heroes of the Ukrainian Insurgent Army." This caused a wave of negative reactions in Ukraine, with Ukrainian foreign minister Andrii Sybiha saying "no foreign president has a right to dictate our history to us" and returning his Republic of Poland Order of Merit in protest on the day of Nawrocki's decision. Zelenskyy later announced he would mail his order back personally to the Chancellery of the Polish president, and posted proof on his social media. Head of Zelenskyy's presidential office, Kyrylo Budanov, followed suit by returning his own order, and even Vasyl Bodnar, Ukrainian ambassador to Poland, did the same. Former prime minister of Ukraine Arseniy Yatsenyuk warned of an unprecedented escalation of mutual animosity.

Three former presidents of Ukraine: Leonid Kuchma, Viktor Yushchenko (who had previously caused controversy in Poland by giving OUN-B founder Stepan Bandera the award "Hero of Ukraine"), and Petro Poroshenko, all announced on 20 June their intention to return awards given to them in previous years (as far back as 1997) by the Republic of Poland as a sign of protest against the Polish state.

As a protest against Zelenskyy's decision, deputy marshal of the Senate Michał Kamiński returned his Ukrainian awards. Additionally, former Polish prime minister Jarosław Kaczyński announced that he would return his Order of Prince Yaroslav the Wise as an "expression of his attitude towards the Ukrainian elites and an act of loyalty to President Nawrocki". Moreover, Polish politicians Mariusz Błaszczak, Zbigniew Rau, Marek Kuchciński, and Adam Bielan stated that they would return their Ukrainian awards out of respect for the victims of the Volhynia and Eastern Galicia massacre, out of loyalty to Karol Nawrocki, and to "express their opposition to Ukrainian political elites escalating the conflict".

Volodymyr Zelenskyy withdrew his planned attendance at a 25 June European conference for the rebuilding of Ukraine in Gdańsk. He cited a recommendation from Ukraine's foreign ministry against doing so. Prime minister Yulia Svyrydenko attended instead. Polish political commentators stated that Zelenskyy had previously cancelled a plan to fly from Rzeszów–Jasionka Airport to the 52nd G7 summit, and instead flew from Chișinău.

On 23 June, several Polish and Ukrainian news media, including Gazeta Wyborcza, OKO.press, TOK FM, Newsweek Polska, Onet.pl, Polityka, Ukrainska Pravda, European Pravda, Espreso TV, Slawa TV, and Press Club Ukraine, published a joint statement declaring that they were "aware of the tragic chapters in Polish-Ukrainian history" and "that politicians [were] exploit[ing] [those historical events] for their own ends". The media stated that the "[Polish and Ukrainian] shared task today is to stop Putin's Russia. The time for a serious conversation about the past, acknowledgment of guilt, and reconciliation will come when Ukraine – with the support of its allies – defeats the aggressor". The media stated their view that Polish and Ukrainian "politicians must show wisdom and good judgment, seek mutual understanding, and find ways out of the crisis" and that Polish and Ukrainian societies "must continue to support one another".

On 26 June, Polish foreign minister Radosław Sikorski criticised both Zelenskyy and Nawrocki. Sikorski stated that Zelenskyy "should have thought: all right, the Ukrainian Insurgent Army fought against Soviet rule, but it also killed Poles," and instead an honour could have been given to "a specific hero who fought against Soviet occupation"; and that Nawrocki's response "was inappropriate, because it humiliated the president of Ukraine personally."

From 1 July 2026, Ukrainian refugees, including the elderly, were no longer provided with free refugee accommodation to encourage Ukrainians to return home after four years of support, or to support themselves financially. The cost of the support was estimated at 40 billion złoty (£8 billion). This followed Polish Prime Minister Donald Tusk's support for proposals to reduce benefits in January 2025.

On 18 September 2026, Poland joined a coalition involving Ukraine and other allies aimed at developing anti-ballistic missile capabilities. Polish Prime Minister Donald Tusk announced the decision during the Carpathian Eight summit in western Ukraine and reiterated Poland's support for Ukraine.

On 20 October 2026, the Lviv Regional Council voted to designate 2027 as the "Year of Roman Shukhevych (military commander of UPA, who is considered responsible for ethnic cleansing of Polish, Jewish, and Romani civilians), the Ukrainian Insurgent Army (military wing of the Organisation of Ukrainian Nationalists), and Oleh Olzhych (Ukrainian poet, political activist, and the head of OUN-M)." In Poland, both President Karol Nawrocki's sovereigntist camp and Prime Minister Donald Tusk's liberal camp condemned the Lviv Regional Council's decision and issued official statements, while Polish Foreign Minister Radosław Sikorski signed a motion that barred Sviatoslav Sheremeta, a deputy of the Lviv Regional Council, from entering the Schengen Area for five years.

On 22 October, the dispute escalated into another major diplomatic rift, the second of the year, as the Polish government suspended talks about support for Ukraine. Additionally, numerous Ukrainian media outlets, citing an anonymous government official, reported that, as a result of the Lviv council's actions, Poland allegedly suspended a planned delivery of a significant package of Polish weapons to Ukraine; however, Poland's Ministry of National Defence denied these allegations soon afterward.

== Resident diplomatic missions ==
- Poland has an embassy in Kyiv and consulates-general in Kharkiv, Lutsk, Lviv, Odesa and Vinnytsia.
- Ukraine has an embassy in Warsaw and consulates-general in Gdańsk, Kraków, Lublin and Wrocław.
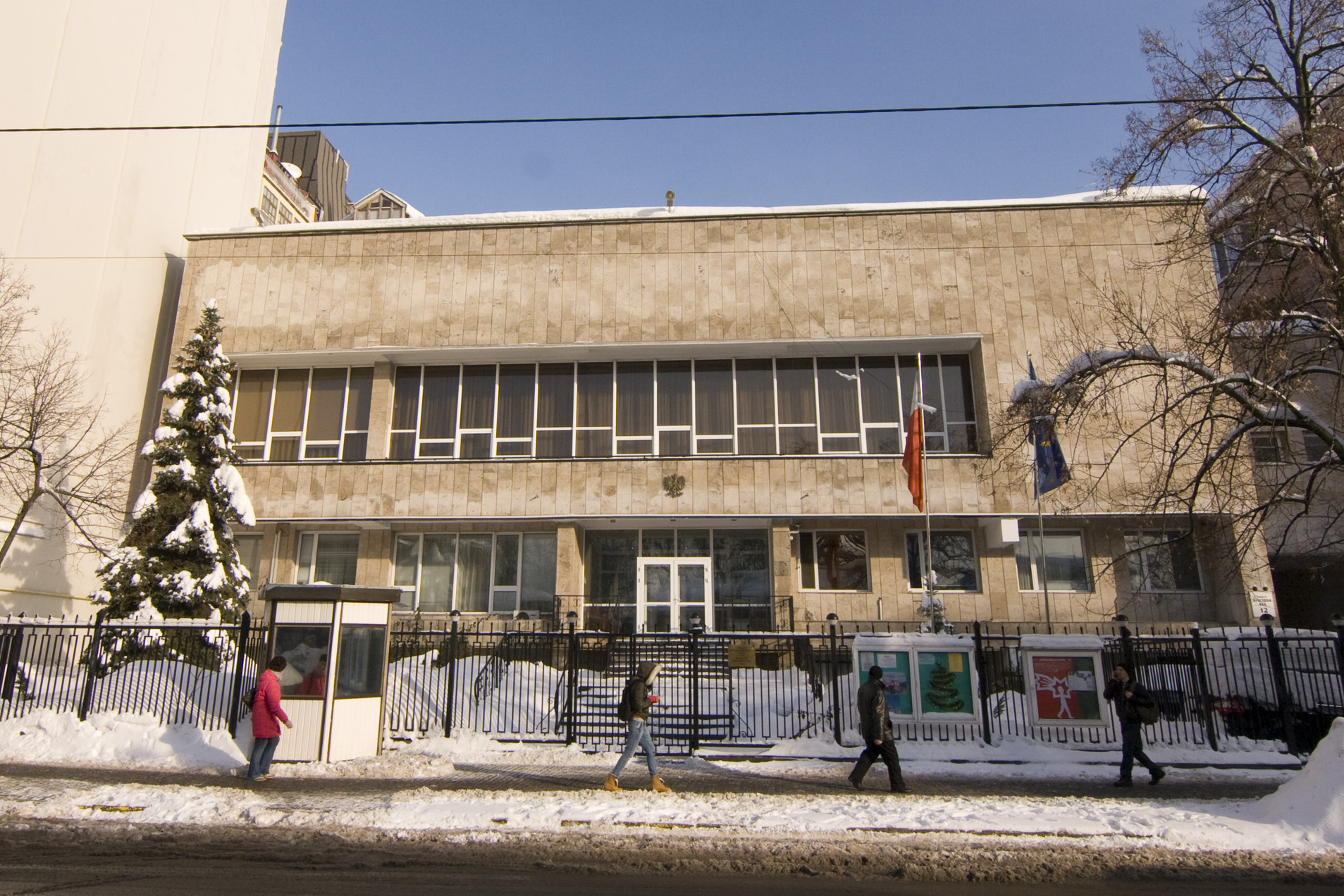
Embassy of Poland in Kyiv

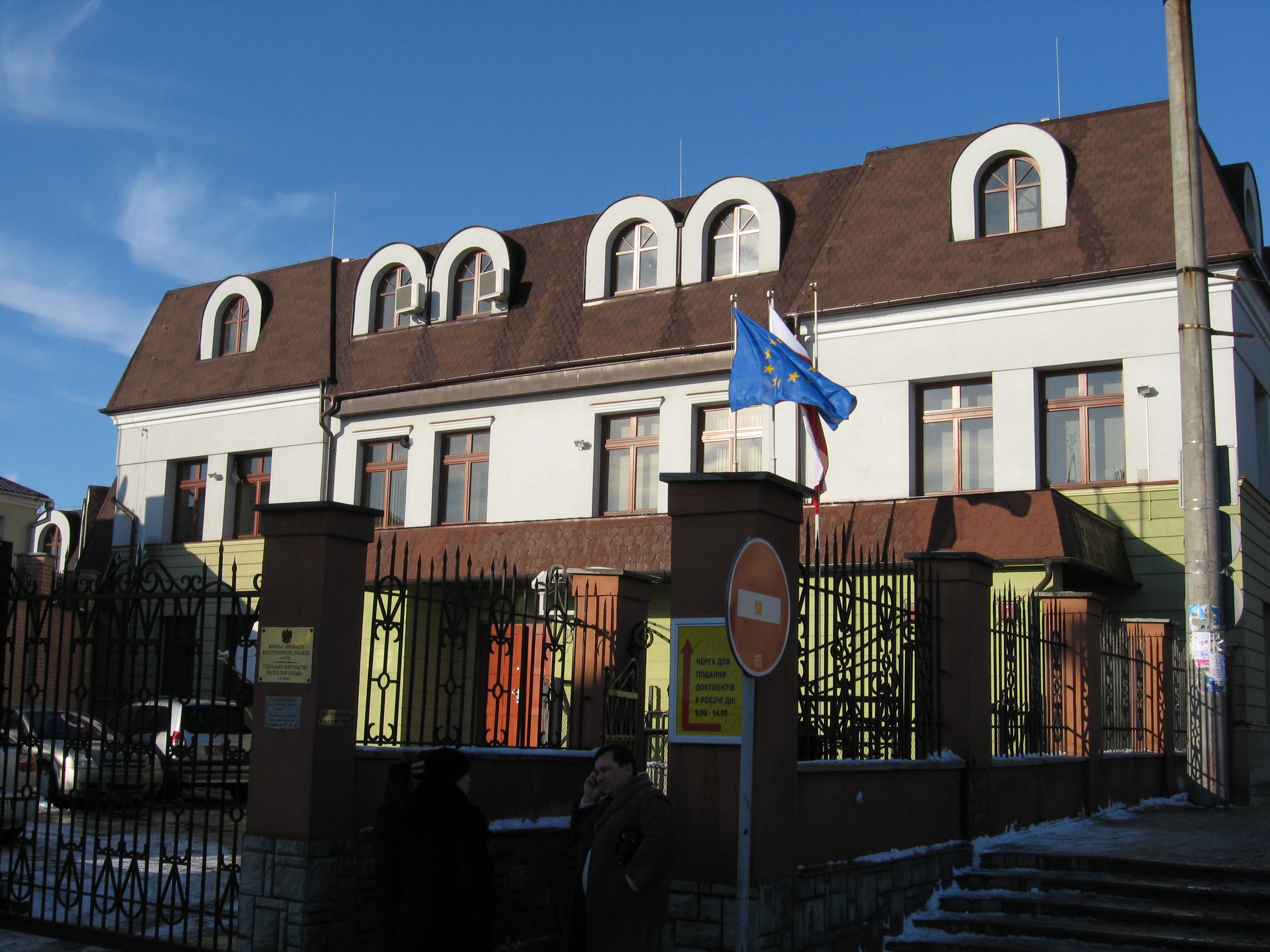
Consulate-General of Poland in Lutsk

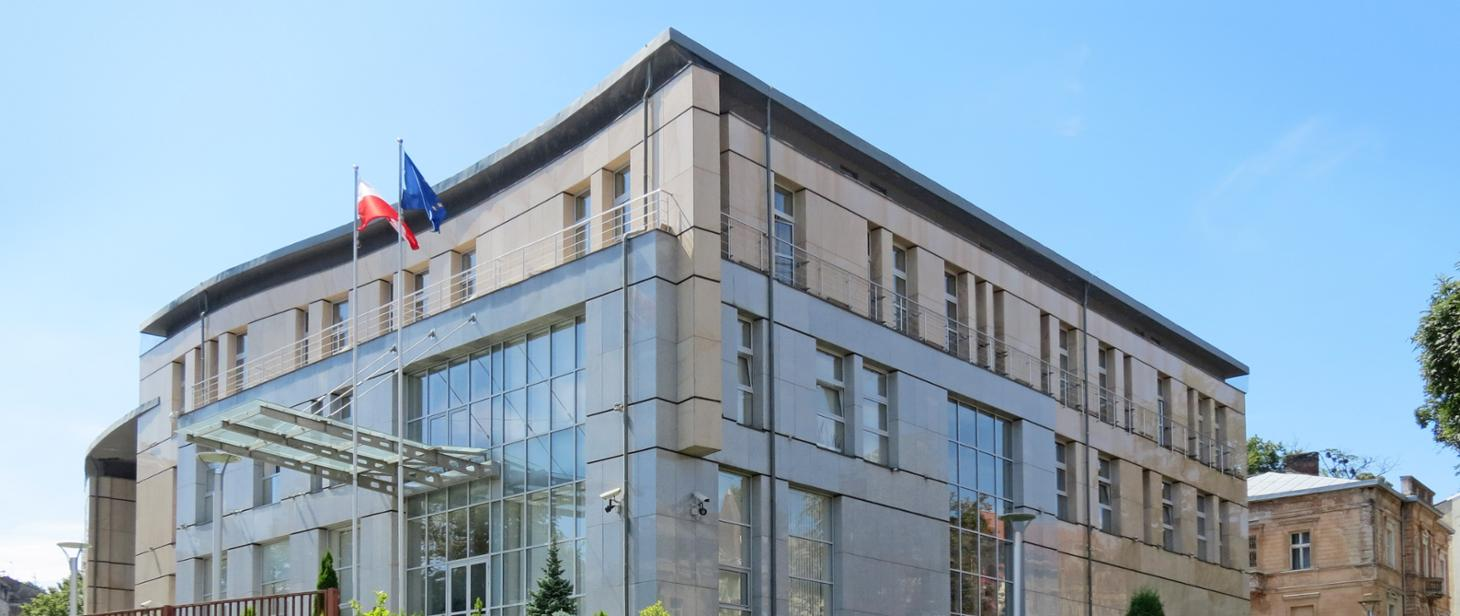
Consulate-General of Poland in Lviv

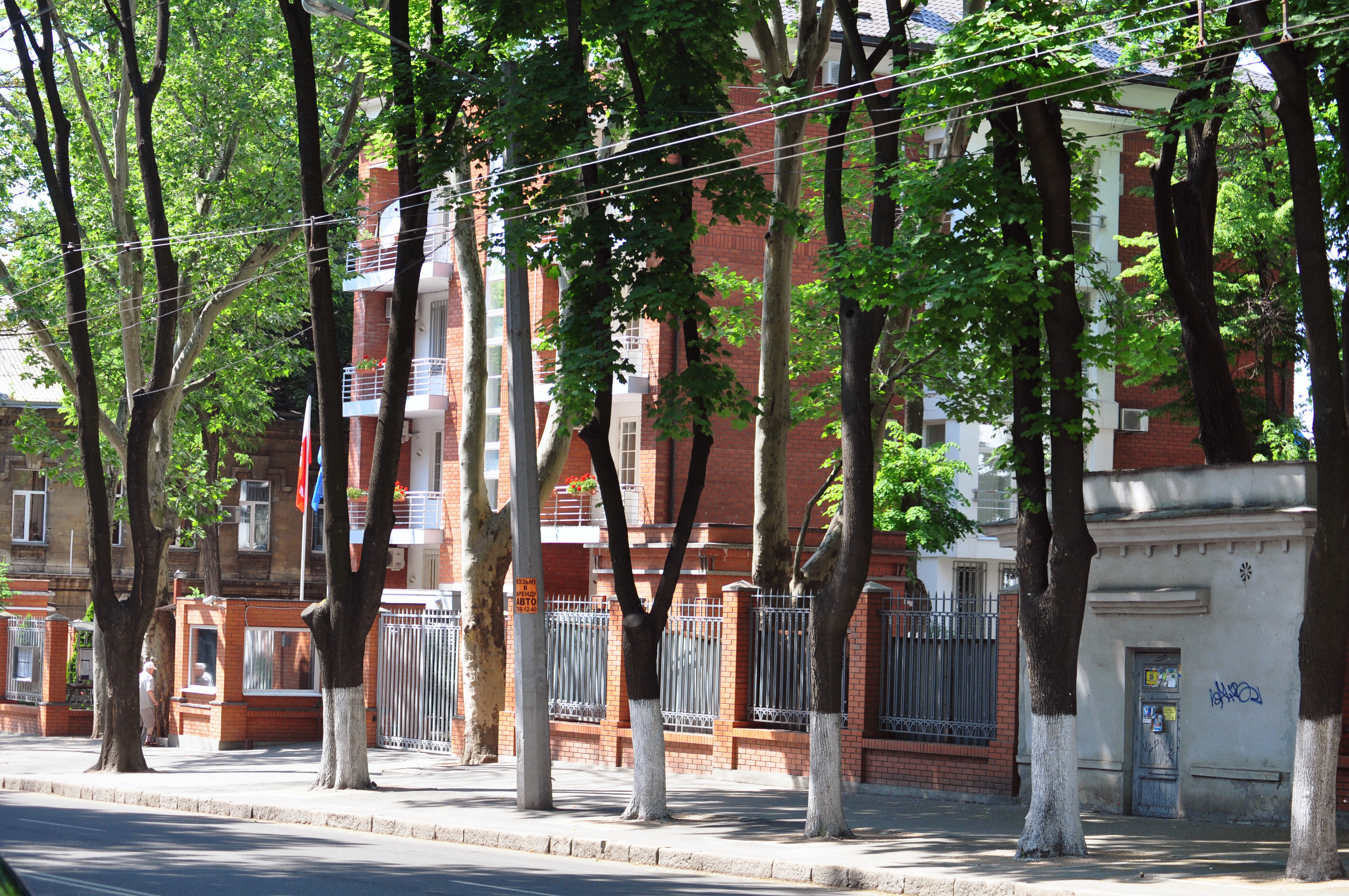
Consulate-General of Poland in Odesa
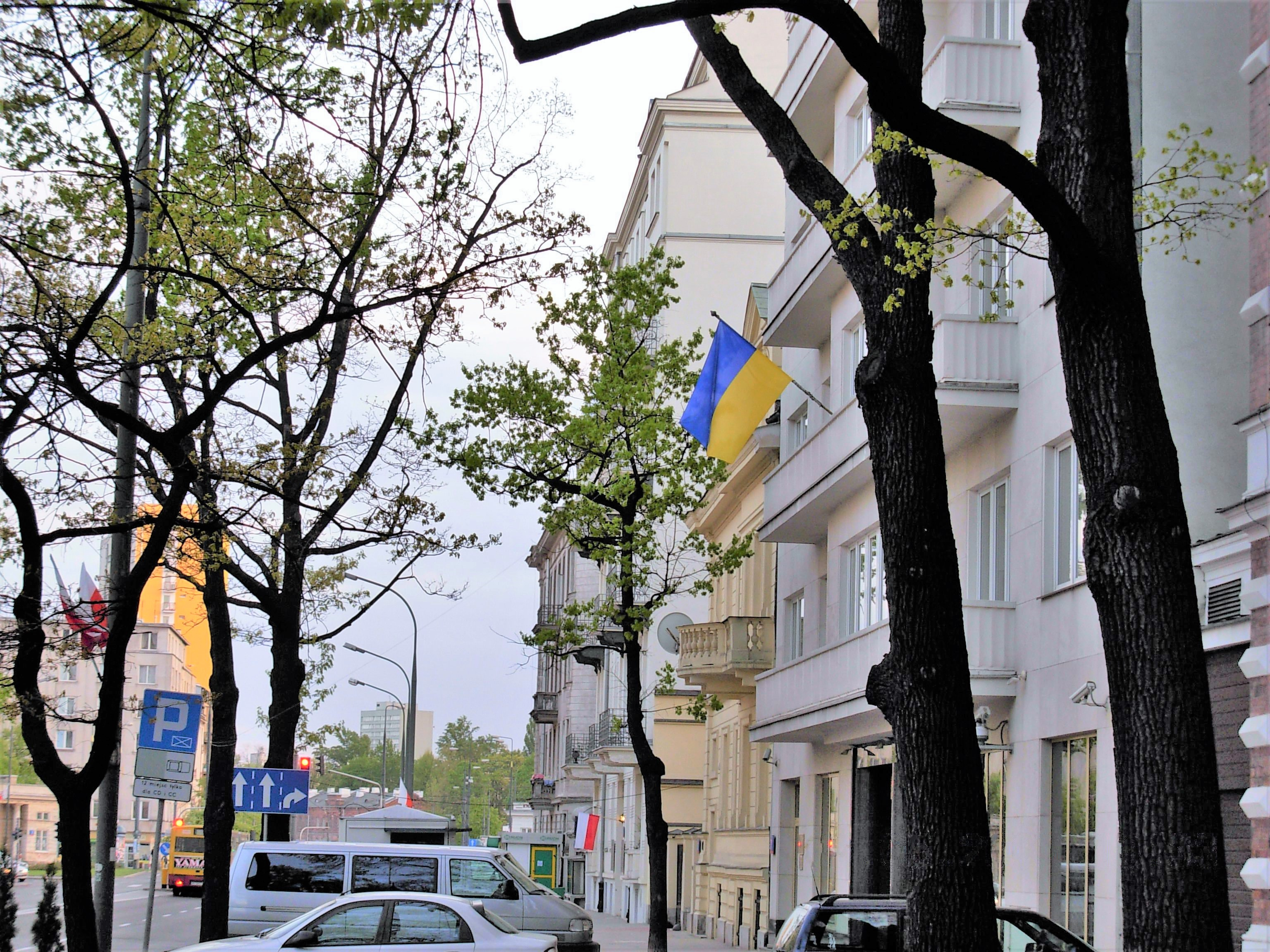
Embassy of Ukraine in Warsaw

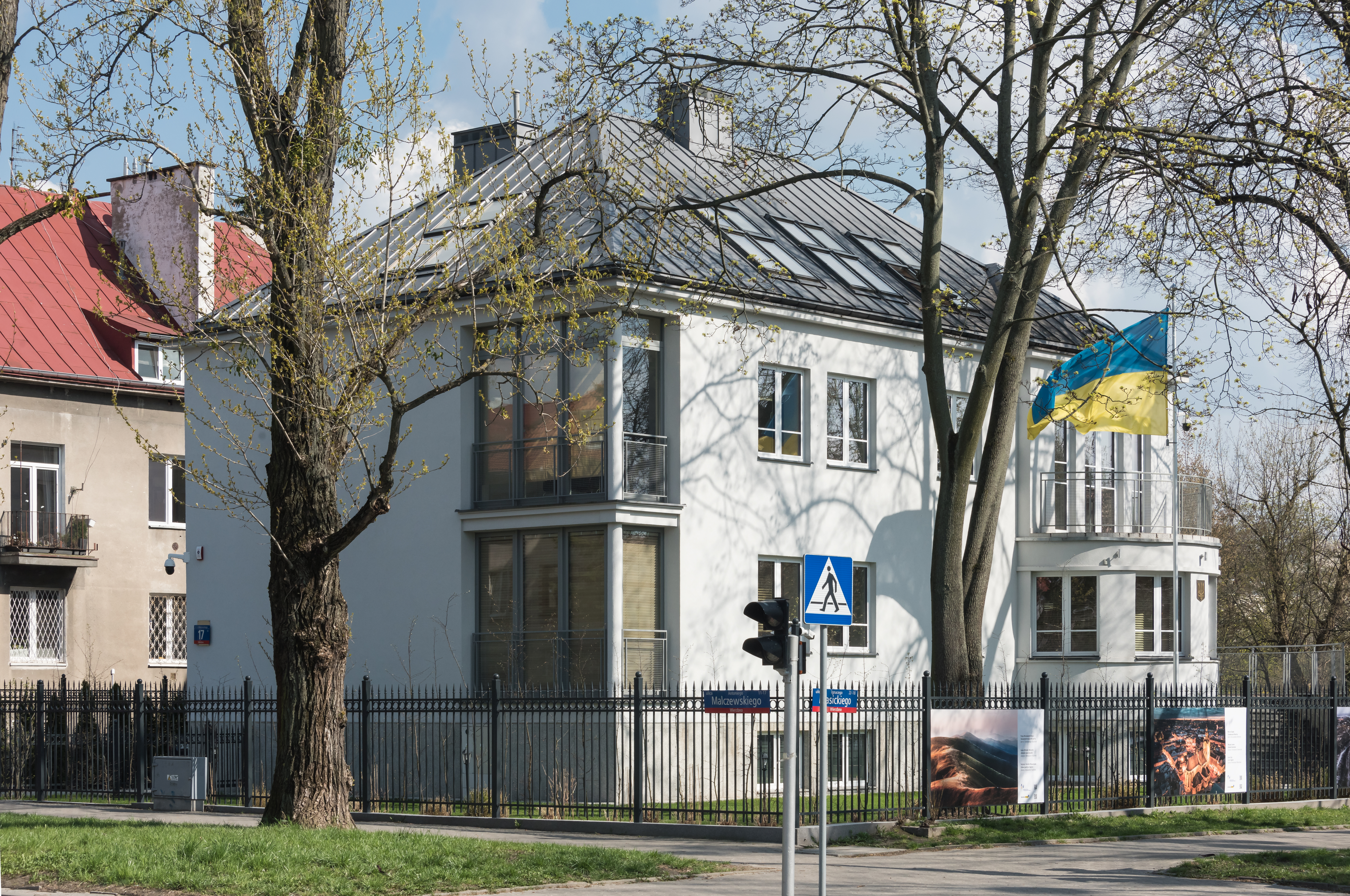
Consulate-General of Ukraine in Warsaw

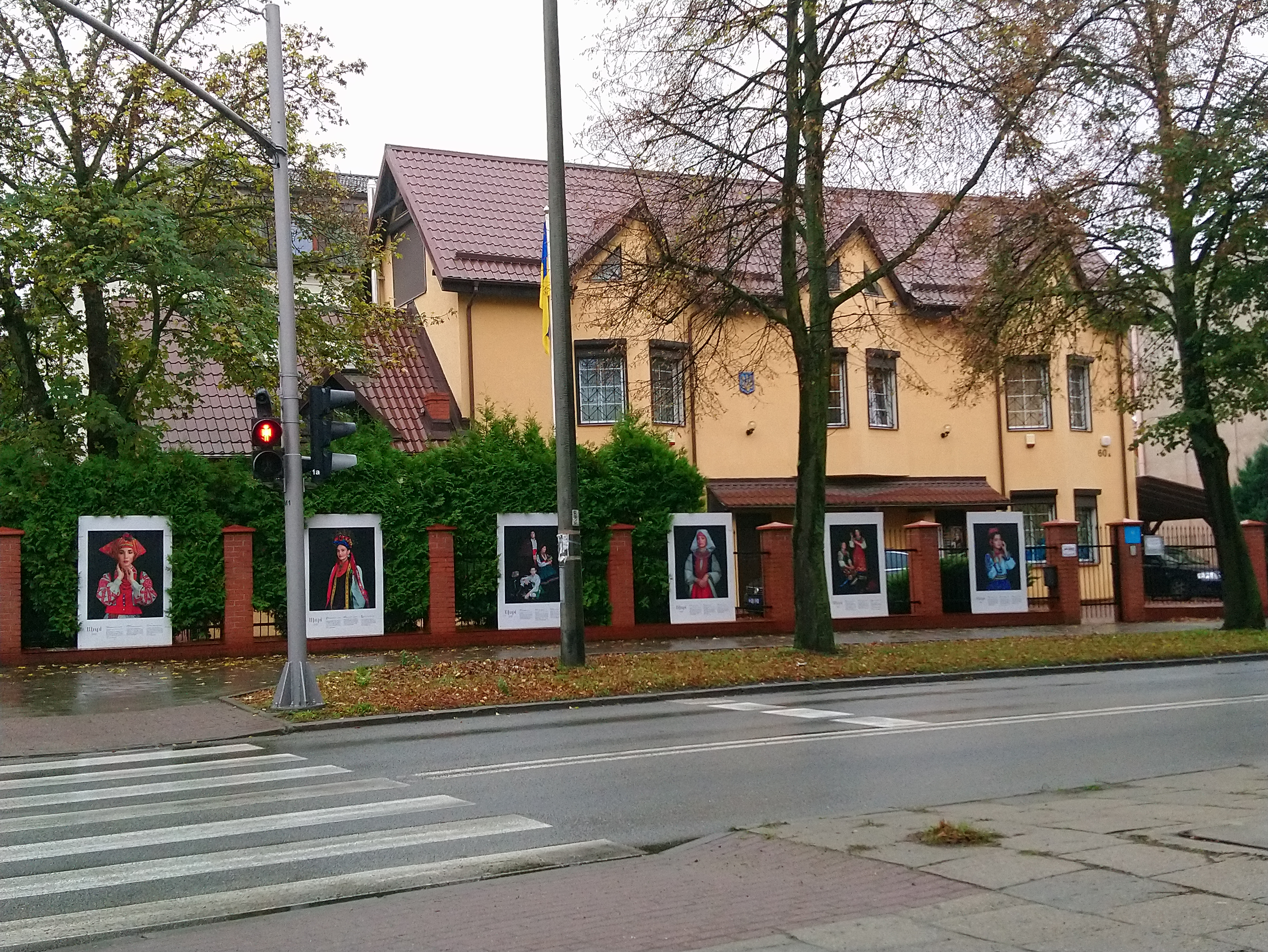
Consulate-General of Ukraine in Gdańsk

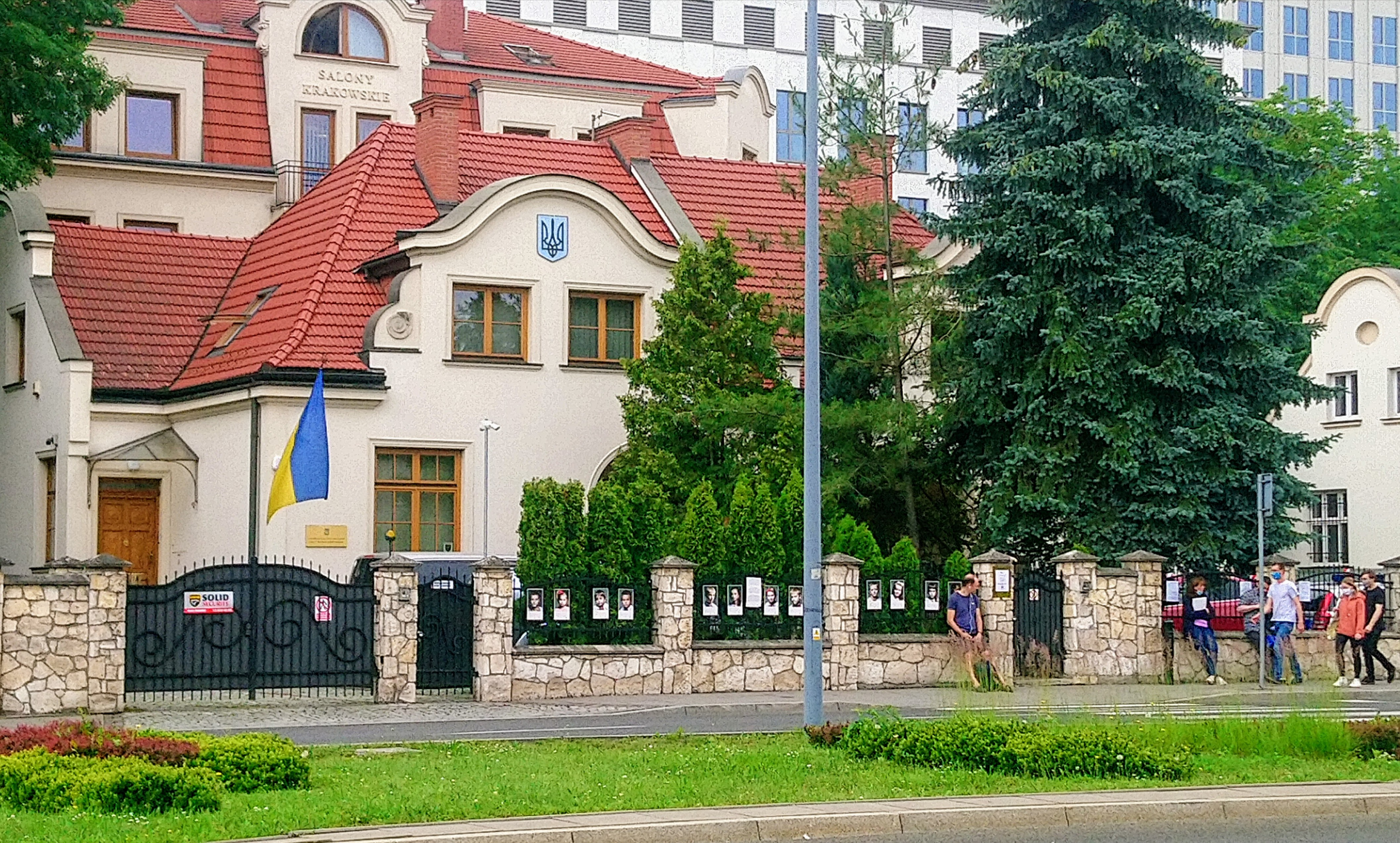
Consulate-General of Ukraine in Kraków

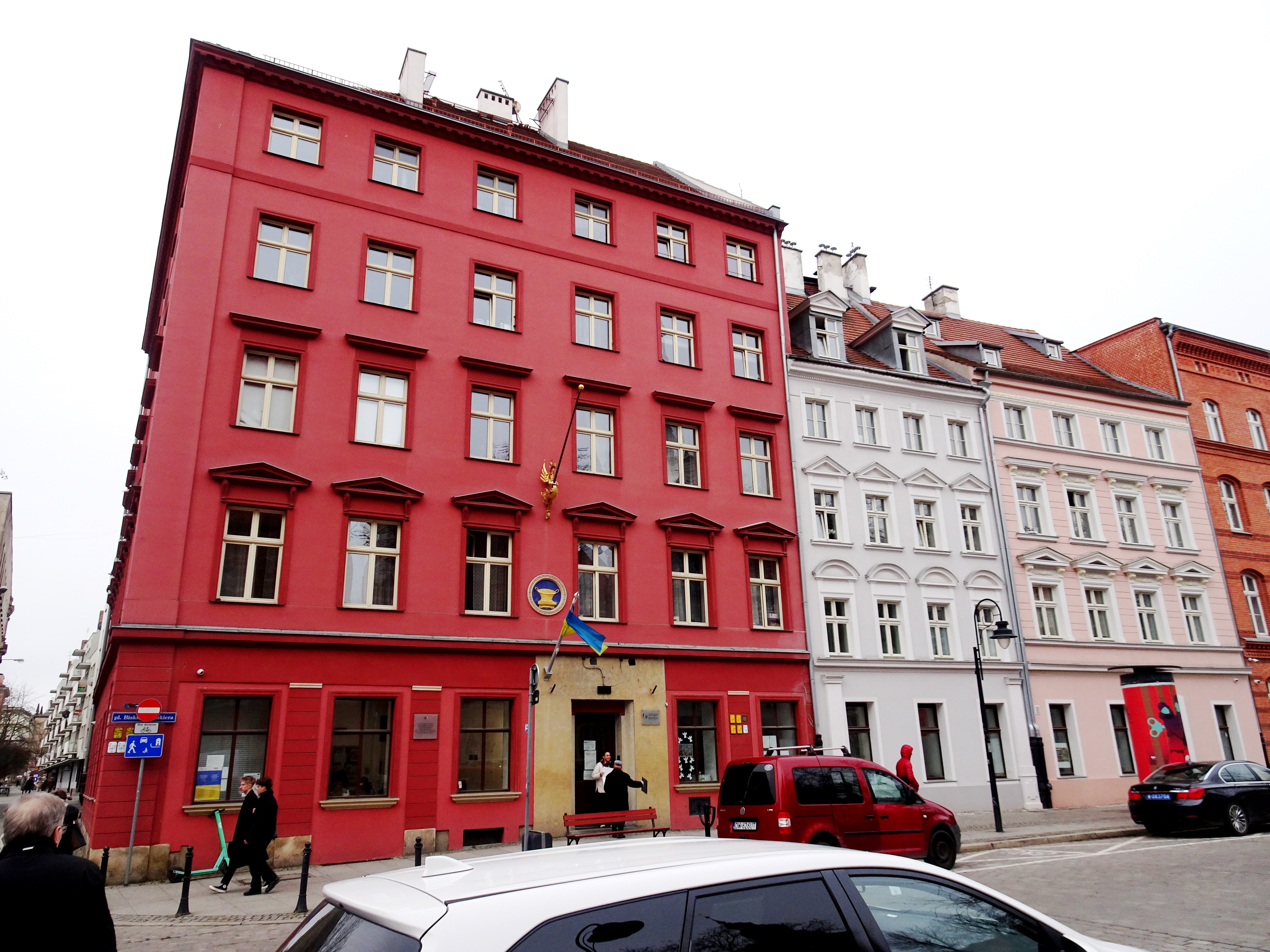
Consulate-General of Ukraine in Wrocław

== See also ==
- Poland–Ukraine border
- History of Ukrainian nationality
- Khmelnytsky Uprising
- Kupala Night
- Massacres of Poles in Volhynia and Eastern Galicia
- Międzymorze
- POLUKRBAT
- Polish–Ukrainian War
- Population exchange between Poland and Soviet Ukraine
- UEFA Euro 2012
- Ukrainians in Poland
- Poles in Ukraine
- Ukraine–EU relations
- Accession of Ukraine to the European Union
- List of twin towns and sister cities in Poland
- List of twin towns and sister cities in Ukraine
- 2022 missile explosion in Poland
