= Polish–Ukrainian Peace Force Battalion =

Polish-Ukrainian Peace Force Battalion
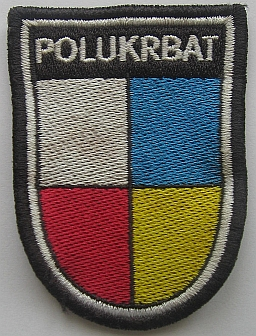
- Battalion Insignia
- Active: March 21, 1998–2010
- Country: Poland, Ukraine
- Type: Combined arms
- Role: participation in international peace-keeping and humanitarian operations under the auspices of international organizations
- Size: 754
- Part of: Multinational Task Force East (MNTF-E)
- Garrison/HQ: Camp Bondsteel
- Nicknames: POLUKRBAT, UKRPOLBAT
- Patron: Polish-Lithuania Hetman Jan Karol Chodkiewicz; Zaporozhian Hetman Petro Konashevych-Sahaidachny

Commanders
- Commander: Lieutenant Colonel Arkadiusz Szkutnik
- Commander of Ukrainian contingent: Lieutenant Colonel Alexander Zahorodniy

Insignia
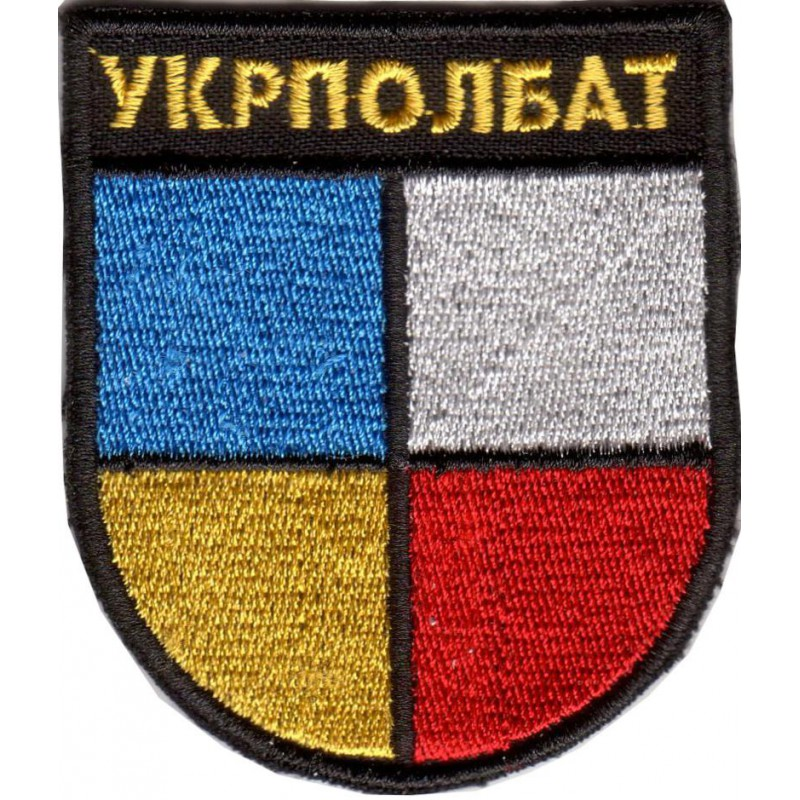
- Ukrainian version of the sleeve patch

Polish–Ukrainian Peace Force Battalion (POLUKRBAT) or Ukrainian-Polish Peace Force Battalion (UKRPOLBAT, Ukrainian: УКРПОЛБАТ) is a Polish-Ukrainian peacekeeping battalion, formed in the late 1990s expressly "for participation in international peace-keeping and humanitarian operations under the auspices of international organizations".

The battalion can be used in international missions approved by the UN Security Council or by similar organization involved in maintaining international peace and security, per the provisions of Chapter 8 of the United Nations Charter or within international forces formed with the approval of the UN Security Council. The battalion can be made fully operational after 30 days from the receipt of a request from the United Nations.

The unit is mutually financed by Ukraine and Poland while other countries provided assistance in non-military aspects, mainly in the advancement of knowledge of English among the troops since English is the operational language of the unit.

Since 2000, the battalion of 545 Polish and 267 Ukrainian soldiers has been deployed as part of KFOR, an international peacekeeping force in Kosovo, claimed as a Serbian province and then under UN administration.

In June 2006, the Ukrainian contingent was reduced to 179 soldiers.

== Creation ==
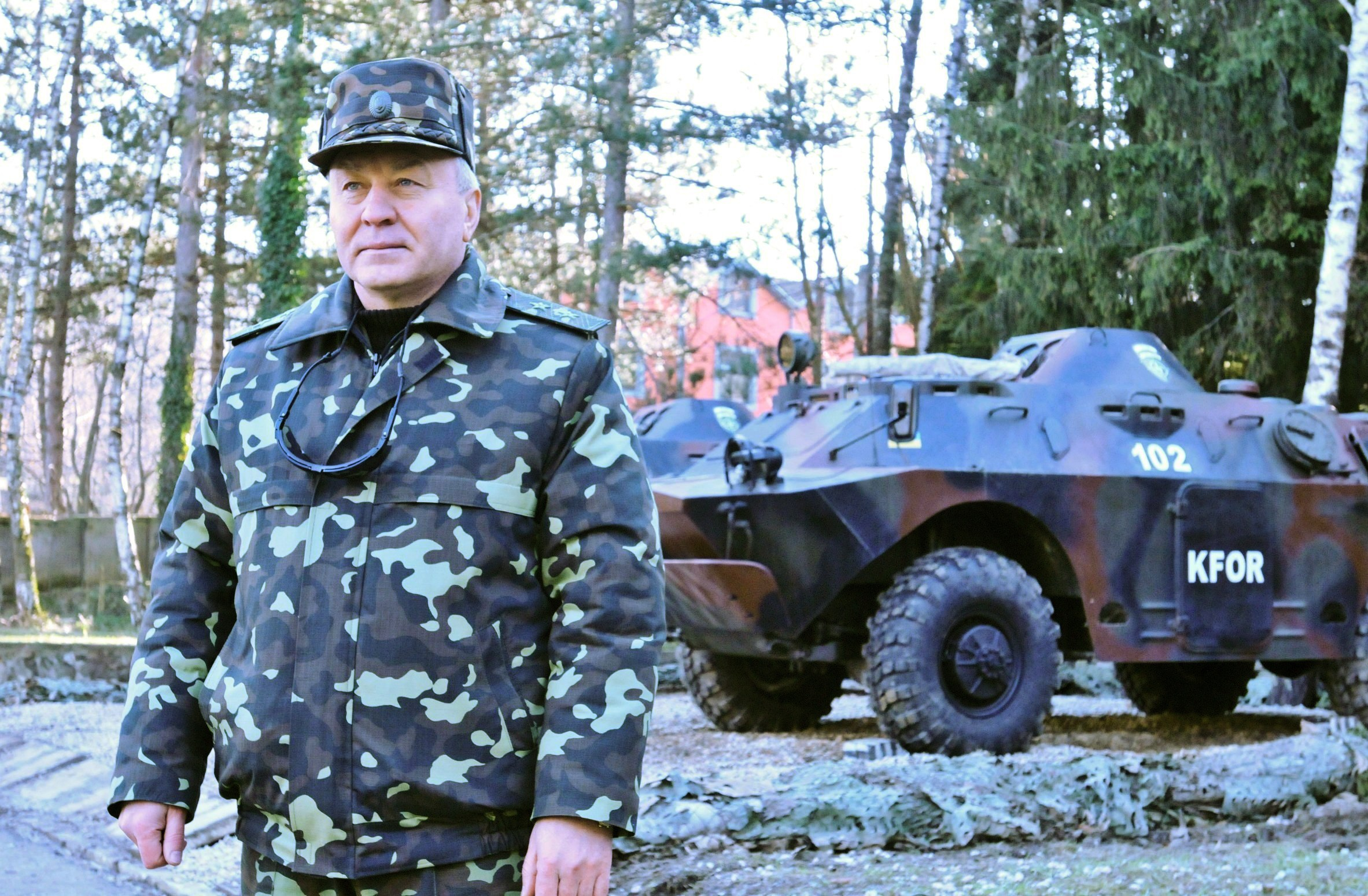
Ukrainian Lieutenant general Rauf Nurullin in front of a KFOR BRDM-2

The Kyiv and Warsaw governments reached a preliminary agreement to create a joint peacekeeping military formation on October 5, 1995; the first training started in 1996 and the respective national units to comprise the battalion were committed in 1997 when on November 26, the Ministers of Defense of Ukraine and Poland signed the appropriate agreement in Warsaw. The Polish component was split from the 14th Armored Brigade and the Ukrainian component was split from the 310th Mechanized Regiment of the 24th Mechanized Division in Yavoriv.

The unit was named after two historic military leaders of the respective nations: Polish-Lithuania Hetman Jan Karol Chodkiewicz and Zaporozhian Hetman Petro Konashevych-Sahaidachny, whose mutual campaign that brought about the stinging defeat of the Ottoman Empire in the Battle of Khotyn (1621) was one of the very few historic examples of Poles and Ukrainians cooperating against a mutual enemy.

However, strong resistance from the Ukrainian parliament (Verkhovna Rada) to the idea of a joint formation with Poland—the country at the time in line to join NATO (the accession took place in March, 1999)—became the main obstacle to the formal creation of the battalion, despite continued efforts of the Ukrainian Ministry of Defense, which favored the idea.

After the Rada voted down the law several times, the Ministry devised a workaround to overcome the parliamentary opposition, and in early 2000 the military announced that in the upcoming rotation of the Ukrainian servicemen of the Kosovo mission scheduled for July 2000, the ministry would deploy the Ukrainian part of battalion, claiming that since the Ukrainian participation in the mission per se had already been approved by the parliament, choosing the unit to replace the troops during the rotation did not need additional parliamentary approval. Fearing that such inevitable deployment would undermine its prestige, the parliament ratified the 1997 agreement on April 6, 2000.

However, on the very next day, April 7, the deputies of the Communist Party of Ukraine registered a protest claiming the ratification took place with procedural violations as many of the deputies registered to have voted in support for the law were, in fact, absent from the parliamentary session. The protest stated that proposed changes in the deployment scheme would turn the Ukrainian troops into a "cannon fodder" noting that according to the attachment specifying the unit's military equipment, most live ammunition of the battalion are to be carried by the Ukrainian troops while the Polish part would only be partially equipped with weaponry but would mostly carry equipment for the medical and communication tasks. The protest, however, had no consequence and the law, signed by Leonid Kuchma, then the President of Ukraine, went into effect.

== Mission ==
The mission of the battalion as a part of Kosovo International peacekeeping force started in July, 2000. Before deployment, the Ukrainian troops undertook special training in the Yavoriv center, the only Ukrainian boot camp that provides training for mountain warfare. The final multinational military exercise in Yavoriv was attended by the Ukrainian and Polish ministers of defense.

The unit's service received good reviews from the force's high command and a positive regard from the Kosovo locals, both Serbs and Albanians.

The Major tasks of the Battalion are:

- Participation in peace support activities in the area of responsibility.
- Execution of functions:
  - patrolling;
  - guard-duty on observational posts;
  - convoy and escort of local inhabitants;
  - protection of schools and churches

== Structure ==
=== Polish Units ===
All turns of POLUKRBAT were based on 21st Tatra Highlanders (Mountain) Brigade.

=== Ukrainian Units ===
Ukrainian units are based in Camp Bondsteel and Camp Breza near the Brezovica village. From 1999 to 2006, units were also stationed in Camp Golden Lion and Camp White Eagle near the village Raca.

Rotation	Unit	Size	Commander	Dates Deployed
1st	1st Separate Special Battalion	321	Lieutenant colonel Volodymyr Shkurat	September 1, 1999 –
2nd	1st Separate Special Battalion	327	Lieutenant colonel Viktor Ganuschak	
3rd	1st Separate Special Battalion	322	Major Serhiy Karnaushenko	August 8, 2002 – August 7, 2003
4th	1st Separate Special Battalion	321	Colonel Valerij Suprigan	August 7, 2003 –
5th	1st Separate Special Battalion	321	Lieutenant colonel Serhiy Karnaushenko	
6th	1st Separate Special Battalion	262	Lieutenant Colonel Viktor Kopachunsky	August 2005 – August 11, 2006
7th	30th Mechanized Brigade	179	Lieutenant Colonel Oleksandr Pavliuk	August 11, 2006 – April 10, 2007
8th	95th Airmobile Brigade	178	Lieutenant Colonel Yevhen Chumachenko	April 10, 2007 – October 9, 2007
9th	30th Mechanized Brigade	179	Lieutenant Colonel Oleksandr Nesterenko	October 9, 2007 – April 12, 2008
10th	72nd Mechanized Brigade	181	Lieutenant Colonel Oleksandr Zahorodny	April 12, 2008 – October 2008(expected)
11th	25th Airborne Brigade	185		October 2008(expected) –

== See also ==
- Lithuanian-Polish Peace Force Battalion (LITPOLBAT)
- Lithuanian–Polish–Ukrainian Brigade (LITPOLUKRBRIG)
