= Lithuanian–Polish Peace Force Battalion =

Lithuanian–Polish peacekeeping battalion (1997–2007)

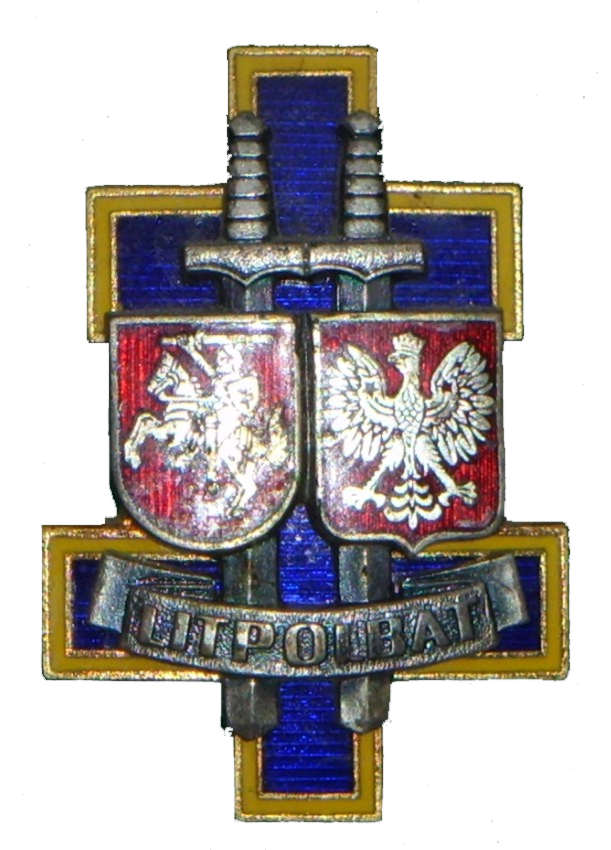
Commemorative award

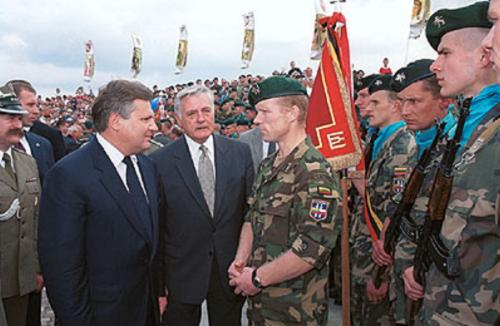
Presidents of Poland and Lithuania meeting LITPOLBAT soldiers on the site of the Battle of Grunwald on July 15, 2000.

Lithuanian–Polish Peace Force Battalion or LITPOLBAT (Polish: Litewsko-Polski Batalion Sił Pokojowych; Lithuanian: Lietuvos ir Lenkijos taikos pajėgų batalionas) was a Lithuanian–Polish peacekeeping battalion, formed in 1997 and disbanded in 2007 as one of the examples of military cooperation between Lithuania and Poland, now both being members of NATO. Soldiers of the battalion served in various peacekeeping missions of the United Nations, NATO and the Organization for Security and Co-operation in Europe. Soldiers of LITPOLBAT have been deployed in Kosovo, Syria, Lebanon and Iraq.

== History ==
Polish–Lithuanian foreign relations were established in 1991. Origins of the military cooperation that led to the unit's creation can be traced to an agreement on the establishment of mutual military cooperation between Poland and Lithuania. That agreement was signed by those countries' respective defense ministries (the Ministry of National Defense of Republic of Poland and the Ministry of National Protection of the Lithuanian Republic) on June 15, 1993 in Vilnius. Since it was signed, various joint training exercises have taken place at the squad and platoon level between Polish and Lithuanian military. Poland has also assisted Lithuanian military by donating equipment worth over one million US dollars and assisting with training.

Creation of such specific unit was first proposed by President of Lithuania, Algirdas Brazauskas, during his speech in Polish parliament (Sejm) in 1995. The unit was officially created on March 3, 1997 when a specific agreement was reached by Polish Ministry of Foreign Affairs and its Lithuanian counterpart. On December 31, 1998 the battalion reached operational readiness.

During a visit of the President of Poland Aleksander Kwaśniewski to Lithuania on April 14, 1999, LITPOLBAT was presented with two military standards, Polish and Lithuanian ones, financed by presidents of both countries. In 2000 LITPOLBAT became a part of the European Union's Rapid reaction force.

In 1999 Poland joined NATO and has since then been supporting Lithuanian entry into that organization; Lithuania joined NATO in 2004. On February 5, 2001 a new agreement of cooperation on the issue of defence was signed between the Government of Poland and the Government of Lithuania reflecting their new NATO-related closer cooperation.

In 2007 the battalion was disbanded. However, from 2008-9 a new formation, the Lithuanian–Polish–Ukrainian Brigade (LITPOLUKRBRIG), has been proposed to continue and expand the same type of regional combined force.

== Organization ==
Polish units of LITPOLBAT came from 4 Suwałki Armored Cavalry Brigade named after General Zygmunt Podhorski in Orzysz, part of Warmia–Mazury Polish 15th Mechanized Division named after king of Poland and Lithuania, Jogaila. Lithuanian units come from Mechanized Infantry Battalion in Alytus, named after Great Lithuanian Duchess Birutė, part of Iron Wolf Mechanised Infantry Brigade in Vilnius.

Nearly 800 soldiers served in the battalion (435 Poles and 351 Lithuanians). NATO press release of 2004 gave the strength of 784. The key staff positions are taken up by rotation. The commander of the unit served for 3 years.

The bilaterally staffed battalion headquarters were located in Orzysz, Poland.
