= Multinational Engineer Battalion Tisa =

Quadrinational unit active since 2002

Multinational Engineer Battalion Tisa: 4 other official names: Багатонаціональний Інженерний Батальйон “Тиса” (Ukrainian); "Tisza" Többnemzeti Műszaki Zászlóalj (Hungarian); Batalionului Multinaţional de Geniu "Tisa" (Romanian); Mnohonárodný Ženijný Рrápor "Tisa" (Slovak)
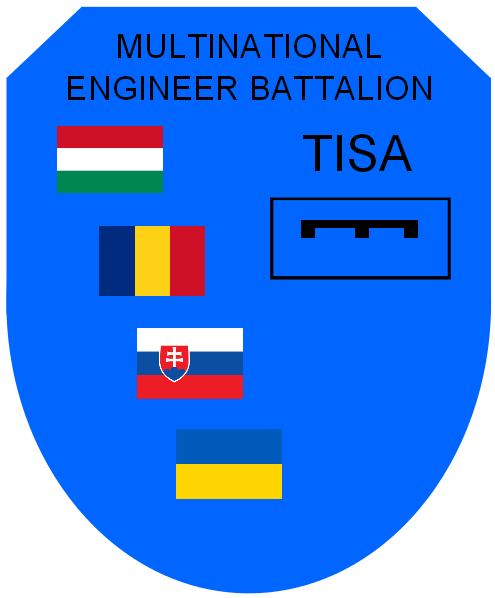
- Sleeve patch of the Battalion.
- Active: November 15, 2002
- Country: Ukraine, Hungary, Romania, Slovakia
- Branch: Land Forces
- Type: Engineer Battalion
- Role: Response to natural disasters
- Size: 703
- Garrison/HQ: Hajdúhadház Vynohradiv; Satu Mare Sereď
- Nicknames: Tisza, Tisa
- Equipment: 6 PTS-2

Multinational Engineer Battalion Tisa (Ukrainian: Багатонаціональний Інженерний Батальйон “Тиса”, Hungarian: "Tisza" Többnemzeti Műszaki Zászlóalj, Romanian: Batalionului Multinaţional de Geniu "Tisa", Slovak: Mnohonárodný Ženijný Рrápor "Tisa") is an engineering unit intended to quickly respond to flooding and other natural disasters in the Carpathian Region. Initial idea for creation of such unit was voiced by Ukraine in December 1998. Battalion was created on November 15, 2002 after Heads of General Staff of Hungarian, Romanian, Slovak and Ukrainian Armed Forces signed the Technical Arrangement on Implementation of Intergovernmental Agreement on Multinational Engineer Battalion Tisa in Budapest. The name comes from river Tisza.

Annual exercise is held by participating nations, who take turns hosting the exercise. Exercise is held under the name Light Avalanche. First exercise was held in Ukraine in 2002 as Tysa-2002.

Host nation	Years in which exercise took place
Hungary	2003, 2007, 2011
Romania	2004, 2008, 2012
Slovakia	2005, 2009, 2013
Ukraine	2002, 2006, 2010, 2014

== Structure ==
Each participating country provides up to 200 soldiers. In January 2012 total size was 703. Ukrainian part is from the 128th Mechanized Brigade. Hungary provides soldiers from 5th Infantry Brigade and the 37th Engineering Regiment Romania provides 52nd Engineering Battalion "TISA". Slovakia provides a company from Engineer Battalion in Sereď.

- Headquarters Company (10 representatives from each country)
- Ukrainian Engineering Company "інженерна рота"
- Ukrainian Road Engineering Company "інженерно-дорожня рота"
- Ukrainian Signal Platoon "взвод зв’язку"
- Ukrainian Repair Platoon "ремонтний взвод"
- Ukrainian Logistics Platoon "взвод матеріального забезпечення"
- Romanian Engineering Company
- Romanian Engineering Company
- Hungarian Engineering Company "műszaki század"
- Slovakian Engineering Company "ženijná technická rota"

== Equipment ==
60 units including 6 PTS-2

== See also ==
- European Army – Defence policy of the European Union
- European army – European army constituted by the countries' armies belonging to the European Union

== Sources ==
«Light avalanche 2014», report of ТРК «Виноградів ТВ». Video on YouTube
