= List of ambassadors of Ukraine to Poland =

Ambassador of Ukraine to Poland

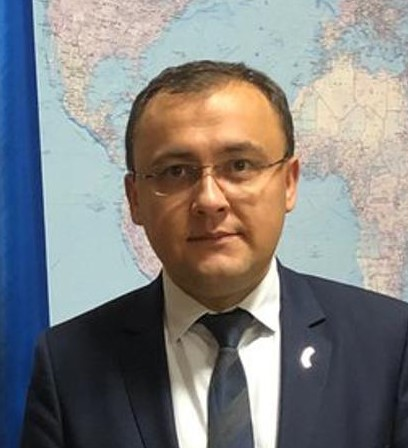
- Incumbent; Vasyl Bodnar since October 2024
- Nominator: Volodymyr Zelenskyy
- Inaugural holder: Hennadiy Udovenko as Ambassador Extraordinary and Plenipotentiary
- Formation: September 1992
- Website: Ukraine Embassy - Warsaw

The Ambassador Extraordinary and Plenipotentiary of Ukraine to Poland (Ukrainian: Надзвичайний і Повноважний посол України в Польщі) is the ambassador of Ukraine to Poland. The current ambassador is Vasyl Bodnar. He was appointed to the position in October 2024.

The first Ukrainian ambassador to Poland assumed his post in 1992, the same year a Ukrainian embassy opened in Warsaw.

== List of representatives ==
=== Ukrainian People's Republic ===
- 1918–1918 – Oleksandr Karpynsky (never assumed the office)
- 1919–1920 – Andriy Livytskyi

=== Ukrainian Soviet Socialist Republic ===
- 1920–1920 – Isai Khurgin
- 1921–1921 – Mieczysław Łoganowski
- 1921–1922 – Oleksandr Shumsky
- 1922–1923 – Hryhoriy Besyedovsky

=== Ukraine ===
- 1991–1991 – Teodoziy Starak (provisional)
- 1991–1992 – Anatoliy Shevchuk (government delegate)
- 1992–1994 – Hennadiy Udovenko
- 1994–1998 – Petro Sardachuk
- 1999–2002 – Dmytro Pavlychko
- 2002–2003 – Oleksandr Nykonenko
- 2003–2005 – Ihor Kharchenko
- 2005–2010 – Olexander Motsyk
- 2010–2014 – Markiyan Malsky
- 2014–2022 – Andrii Deshchytsia
- 2022–2024 – Vasyl Zvarych
- Since 2024 – Vasyl Bodnar

== See also ==
- Ukrainian Embassy, Warsaw
