= 100 Sobieskiego Street =

Residential building complex in Warsaw, Poland

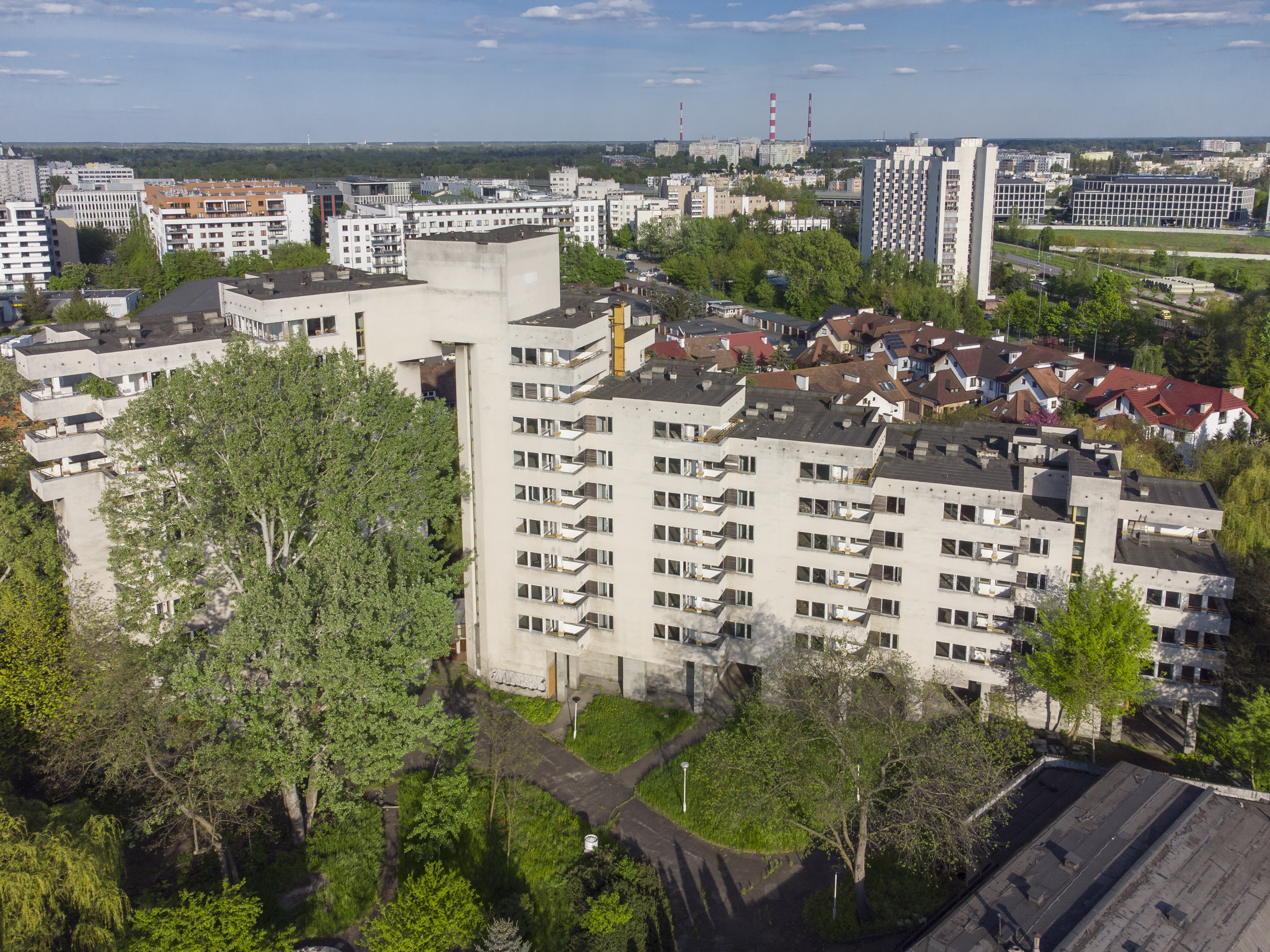
- Interactive map of the 100 Sobieskiego Street area

General information
- Status: Completed
- Type: Residential
- Architectural style: Modernist
- Location: Warsaw, Poland, 100 Sobieskiego Street
- Coordinates: 52.19737°N 21.04056°E
- Construction started: 1977
- Completed: 1978
- Owner: Warsaw City Council

Technical details
- Material: Concrete
- Floor count: 11

Design and construction
- Architects: Janusz Nowak; Piotr Sembrat

Other information
- Number of suites: c. 100

100 Sobieskiego Street, nicknamed "Spyville" (Polish: "Szpiegowo"), is a housing complex located in the Sielce neighborhood of the Mokotów district of Warsaw, Poland. It was developed during the time of the People's Republic of Poland in the late 1970s as accommodation for Soviet diplomats. The complex was widely rumoured to be inhabited by spies, giving rise to its nickname.

Following the collapse of the Soviet Union, its ownership (along with that of several other buildings used by the Russian Embassy) was the subject of a longstanding dispute.

In 2022, in the context of the ongoing Russian invasion of Ukraine, the long-abandoned complex was seized from the Government of Russia by Polish authorities and transferred to the Warsaw City Council which pledged to use it for the benefit of Ukrainian refugees in Warsaw.

== History ==
=== Russian control ===
In 1974, the Soviet Union and the Polish People's Republic entered into an agreement to grant one another rights to land in Warsaw and Moscow respectively to provide residential accommodation for diplomats. Moscow was granted nine sites across Warsaw, including a plot of land at 100 Sobieskiego Street; however, the ownership agreement relating to this plot was reportedly never notarised and so the property formally remained the property of the Polish Treasury.

100 Sobieskiego Street is located on Warsaw's Royal Route, adjacent to Park Sielecki. It was designed by the Polish architects Janusz Nowak and Piotr Sembrat. Construction commenced in 1977 and the complex was completed in 1978. It comprises two modernist concrete tower blocks (linked by an aerial bridge) that provided approximately 100 "spacious" apartments along with ancillary uses such as a kindergarten, telephone exchange, barber, sauna and a movie theater, later converted into a basketball court. The taller block is 11 storeys. The complex is surrounded by a steel fence along with a "moat-like" pond to the east. It has been described as "a daring example of avant-garde modernism".

100 Sobieskiego Street provided accommodation for employees of the Embassy of Russia in Poland and their families, as well as businesspeople visiting from the Soviet Union. The residents of the complex departed in the mid-1990s, although it continued to be fenced and guarded. In 1998, the property was briefly leased to the firm "Fart" which rented out the flats illegally. In 2005, the complex was raided by police to put an end to this and the high rise was finally left abandoned. From soon after the 2005 raid until 2017, "Club 100", a nightclub catering to Russian ID holders, operated from one of the outbuildings at the front of the complex.

100 Sobieskiego Street gave rise to various urban legends, including that it "was a spy base and safe house for the KGB, that it was home to a huge radio communication station, that it was occupied by the Russian mafia and even that there were mysterious underground tunnels and its cellars were used as a makeshift prison". There were rumours of "secret rooms, safes full of cash and an arsenal of spying equipment". After residents left the complex, it became a popular destination for urban explorers.

=== Termination of agreement and seizure ===
In 2012, the Ministry of Foreign Affairs and Warsaw City Council terminated the agreement and demanded the return of 100 Sobieskiego Street. The Government of Russia asserted ownership of the property and declined to pay rent. In October 2016, a Warsaw court issued a default judgment ordering the Government of Russia to hand the property back to Poland. In April 2017, the same court ordered the Government of Russia to pay 7.8 million złoty of back rent.

In April 2022, a bailiff acting for the Mayor of Warsaw Rafał Trzaskowski took possession of the complex. The move was protested by Sergey Andreyev, the Russian ambassador to Poland, who stated that a diplomatic site had been illegally occupied. Trzaskowski stated that 100 Sobieskiego Street would be used to "serve the Ukrainian community". Initially, it was envisaged that the complex would be used to provide accommodation for refugees from Ukraine stemming from the 2022 Russian invasion of Ukraine. Andrii Deshchytsia, the Ambassador of Ukraine to Poland, stated that Ukraine would request to lease 100 Sobieskiego Street and suggested it could be used for a school or Ukrainian cultural center.

Due to the disrepair of the buildings, engineers assessed the condition of the buildings to determine whether they could be refurbished or whether they needed to be demolished. In February 2023, deputy mayor Tomasz Bratek announced that the building was not expected to require to be demolished.

=== Refurbishment ===
In 2025, Warsaw City Council announced that the buildings would be repurposed to provide housing for "representatives of those professions that are particularly important for the functioning of the city". The estimated cost of the works was 100 million złoty (€23.5 million), some of which was proposed to be raised from the National Development Bank. The works would include reconnection of utilities, replacement of doors and windows, and the construction of a new building of up to six storeys.

In January 2025, 100 Sobieskiego Street was handed to Warsaw City Council. In late 2025, Warsaw City Council launched an architectural competition. The scope of the competition was to refurbish and modernise the existing multi-family building, as well as replacing the two one-story service buildings with new buildings. In mid 2026, JSK Architekci was announced at the winner of the competition, with its proposal being for the renovation of the complex into around 180 flats to be owned by Warsaw City Council. Warsaw City Council has secured a budget of over 132 million złoty for the redevelopment.
