= Finland–Ukraine relations =

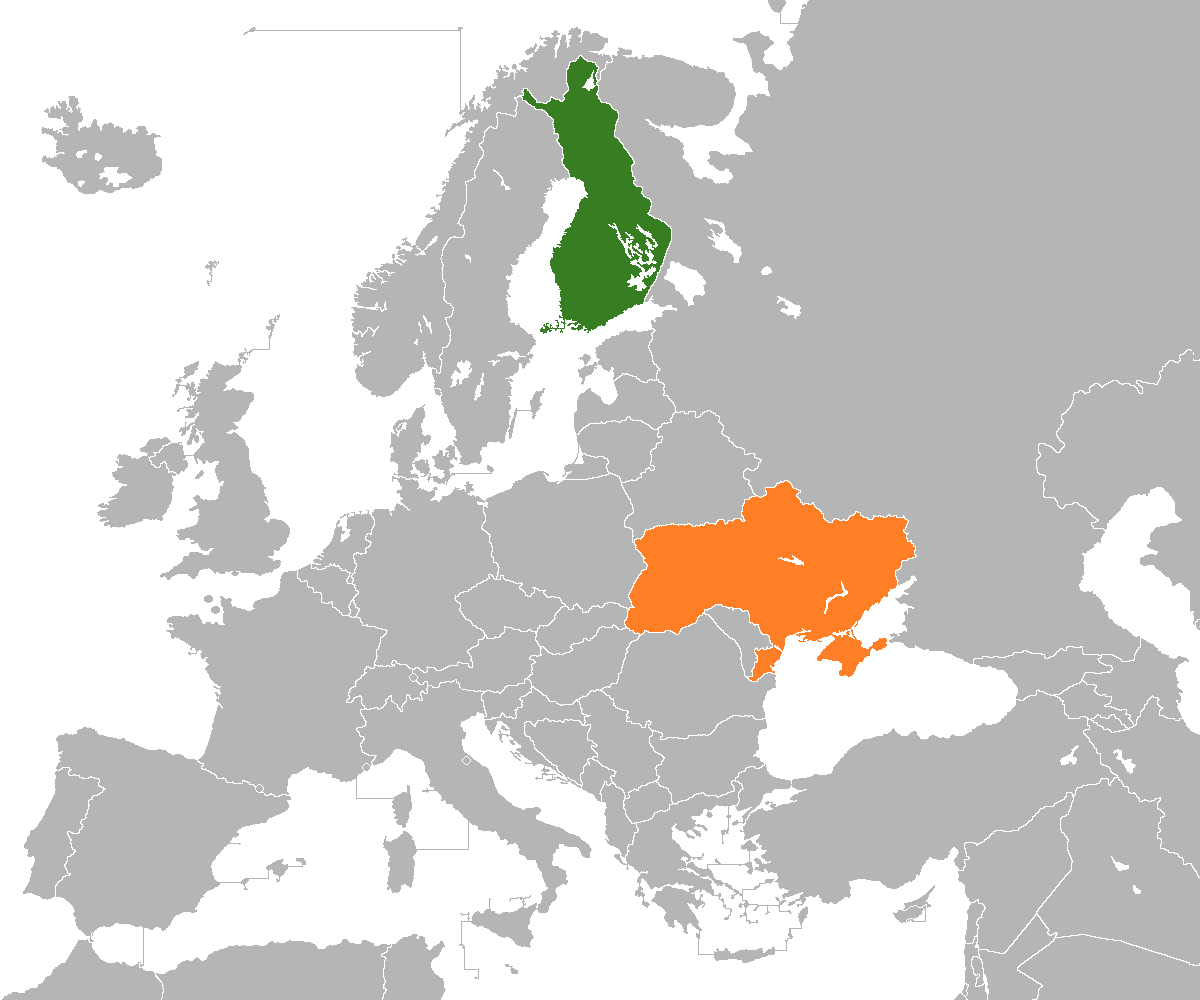
- Finland: Ukraine

Diplomatic mission
- Embassy of Finland, Kyiv: Embassy of Ukraine, Helsinki

Before 1918, both Finland and Ukraine were part of the Russian Empire. In 1918, Finland was one of the first countries to recognise Ukraine and open a diplomatic mission in Kyiv. Finland once again recognised Ukraine on December 30, 1991. Both countries established diplomatic relations on February 26, 1992. Finland is a member of NATO and the European Union which Ukraine applied for in 2022. Both countries are full members of Council of Europe. Finland fully supports Ukraine's bids to join the European Union and NATO.

== Security cooperation ==
In 3 April 2024, President of Finland Alexander Stubb and President of Ukraine Volodymyr Zelenskyy signed a ten-year agreement on security cooperation and long-term support between Finland and Ukraine. It is said to be an indication of Finland's long-term commitment to supporting Ukraine.

The agreement covers several sectors such as political support and support for Ukraine's defense, security, reforms and reconstruction. Finland is the eighth country to sign a bilateral security agreement with Ukraine.

In 19 April 2025, Finland and Ukraine signed a civil protection agreement. It concerns the intensification of cooperation on Air raid shelter.

In 23 August 2026, The Finnish defense company Patria signed a cooperative agreement and Letter of Intent with Ukrainian drone manufacturer Center of Unmanned Technologies (General Cherry) to establish drone manufacturing capabilities in Finland, aimed at boosting European defense and unmanned aerial systems.

== Russian Invasion of Ukraine ==
The value of defense material support provided by Finland is approximately 2 billion euros. In addition, Finland has provided Ukraine with humanitarian aid and development cooperation support of around 220 million euros, and through the EU rescue service mechanism, material aid worth around 18 million euros. In 2022-2023, the reception costs of Ukrainians who received temporary protection, counted as development cooperation, were around 550 million euros.

Finland has granted humanitarian aid to respond to an acute emergency and increased and adjusted development cooperation support so that it meets immediate needs and strengthens society in the midst of war.

Karelian National Battalion is a formation of the Ukrainian Armed Forces, functioning as a component of the International Legion of Territorial Defence of Ukraine. The battalion is a voluntary military unit that consists mainly of ethnic Karelians and other Baltic-Finnic peoples.

In October 2026, Finland announced its gonna donating 10 retired Dv12 diesel locomotives along with spare parts free of charge to Ukraine's state railway company, Ukrzaliznytsia.

== Resident diplomatic missions ==
- Finland has an embassy in Kyiv.
- Ukraine has an embassy in Helsinki.
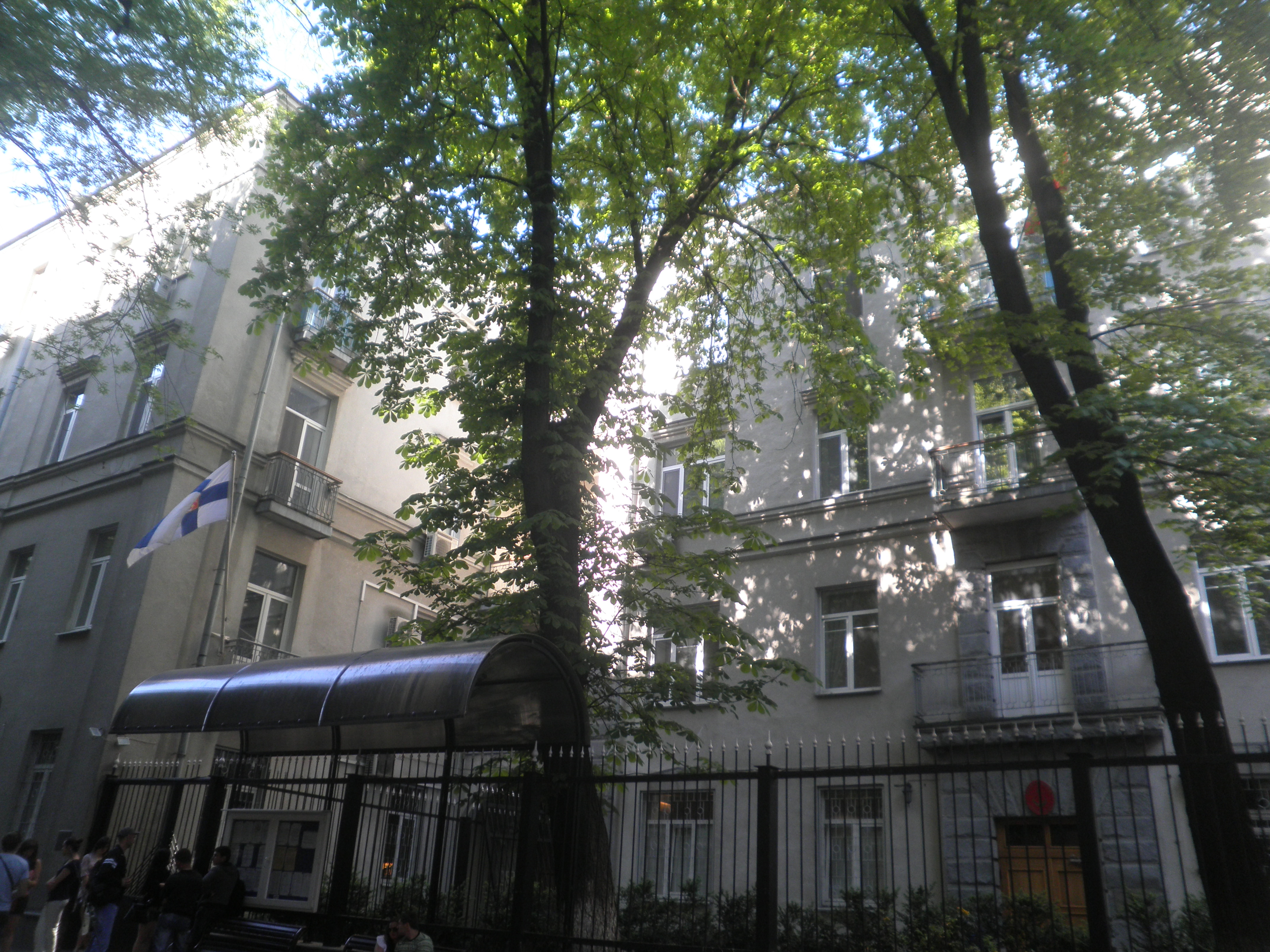
Embassy of Finland in Kyiv

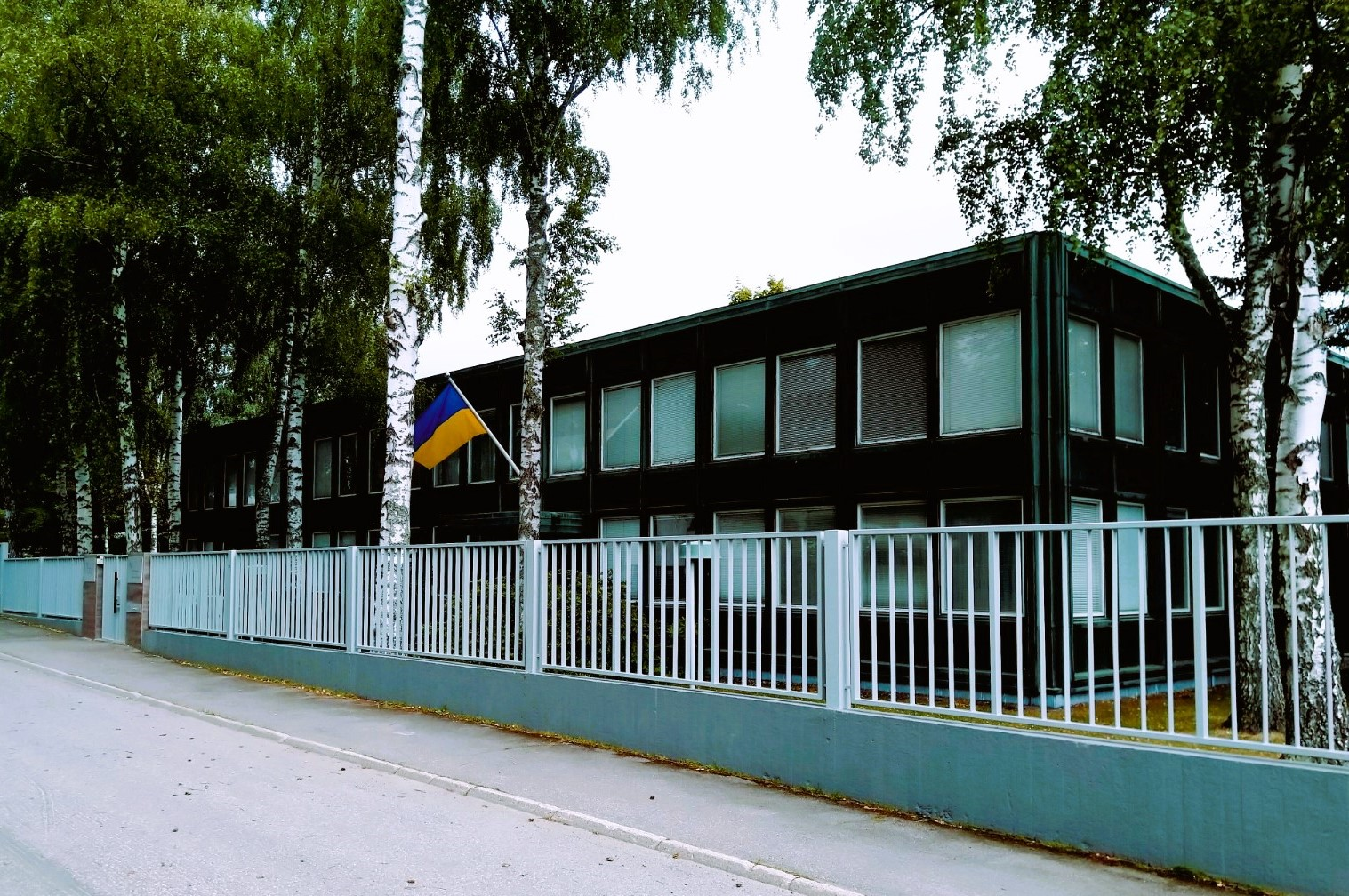
Embassy of Ukraine in Helsinki

== Gallery ==
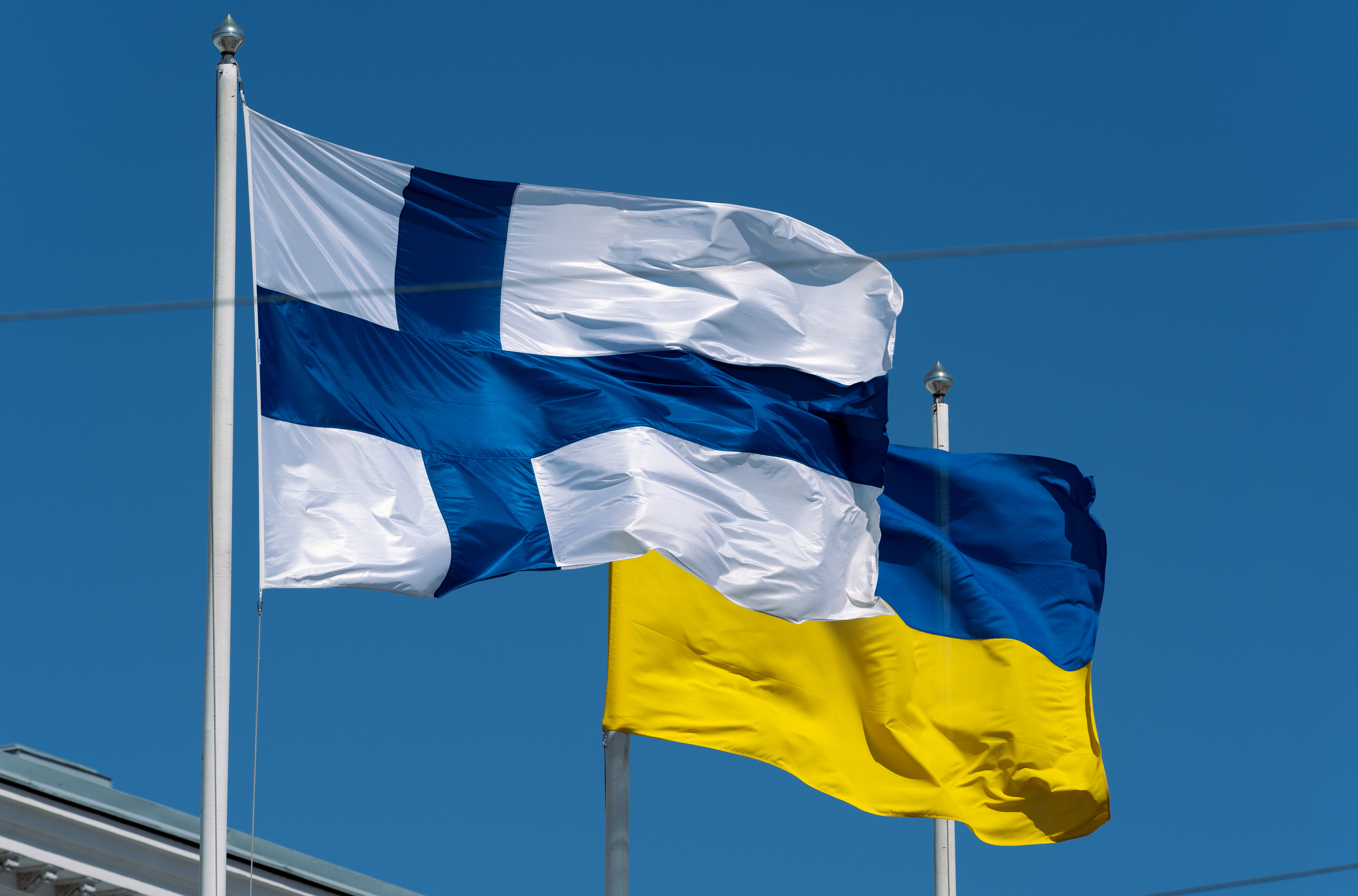
Finland and Ukraine flags in Helsinki. June 13, 2022.

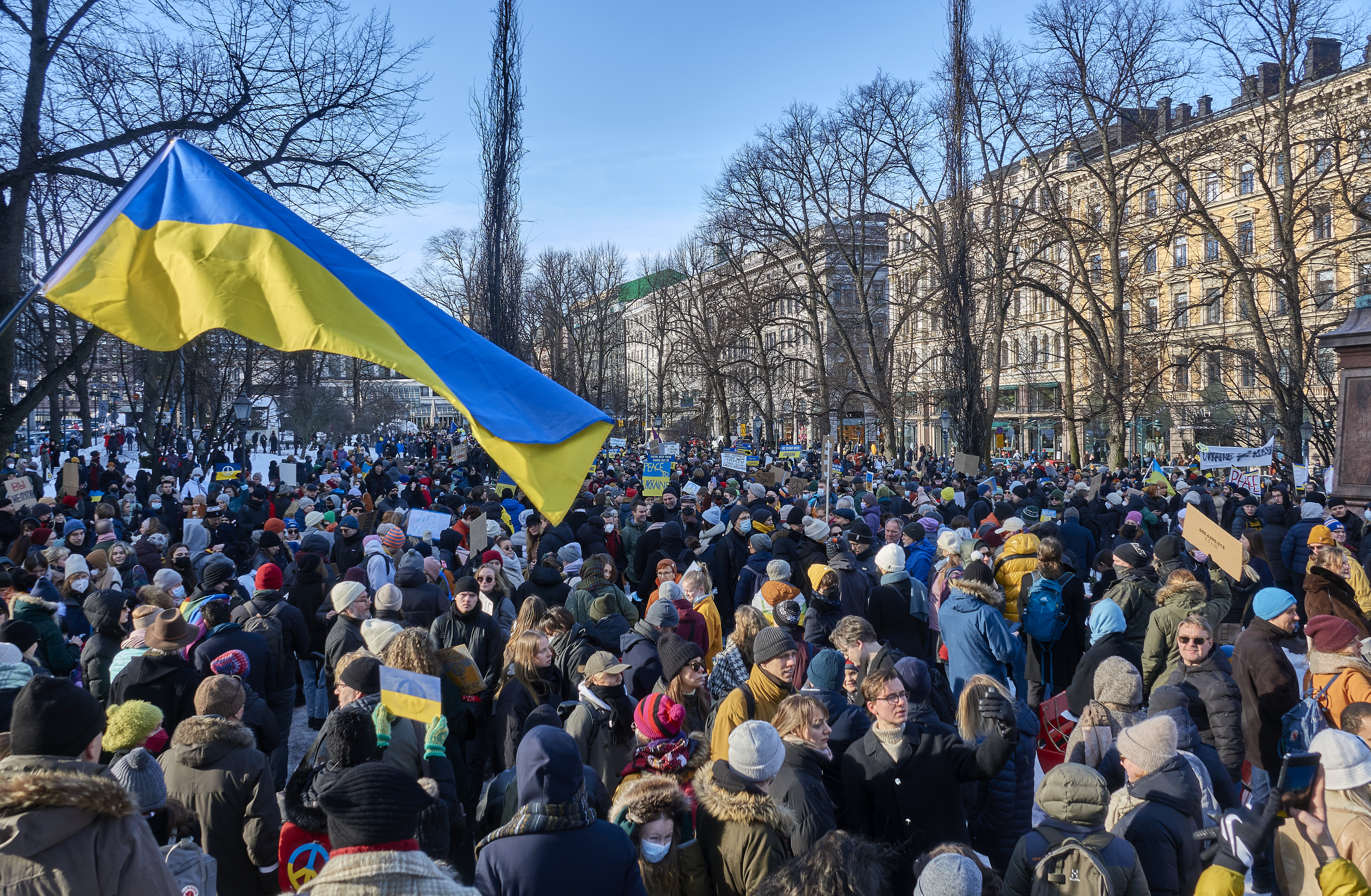
We Stand with Ukraine protest in Helsinki Finland in 26 February 2022, two days later when Russian invasion of Ukraine begin.

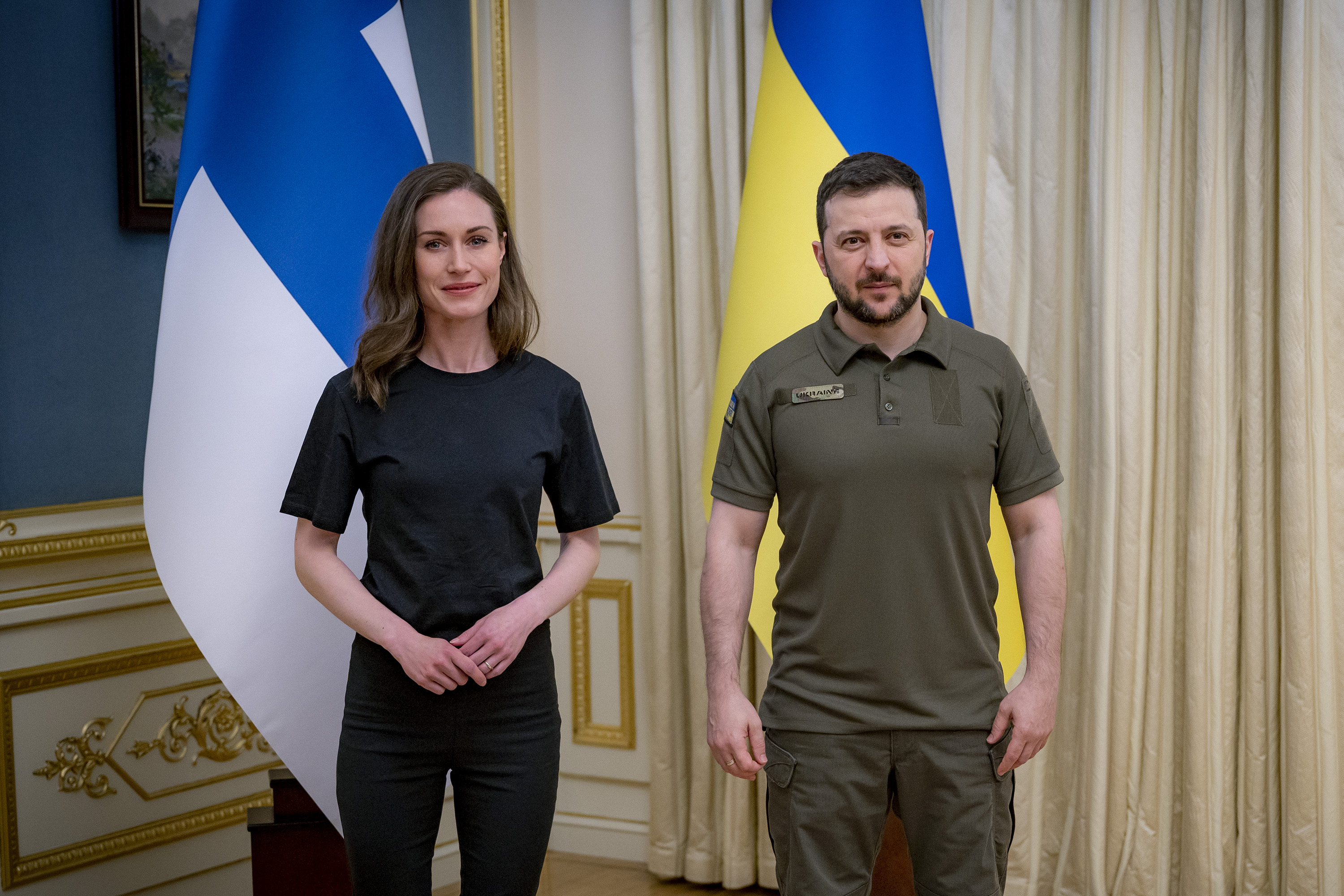
Finnish Prime Minister Sanna Marin with Ukrainian President Volodymyr Zelenskyy meet in Kyiv, 26 May 2022.

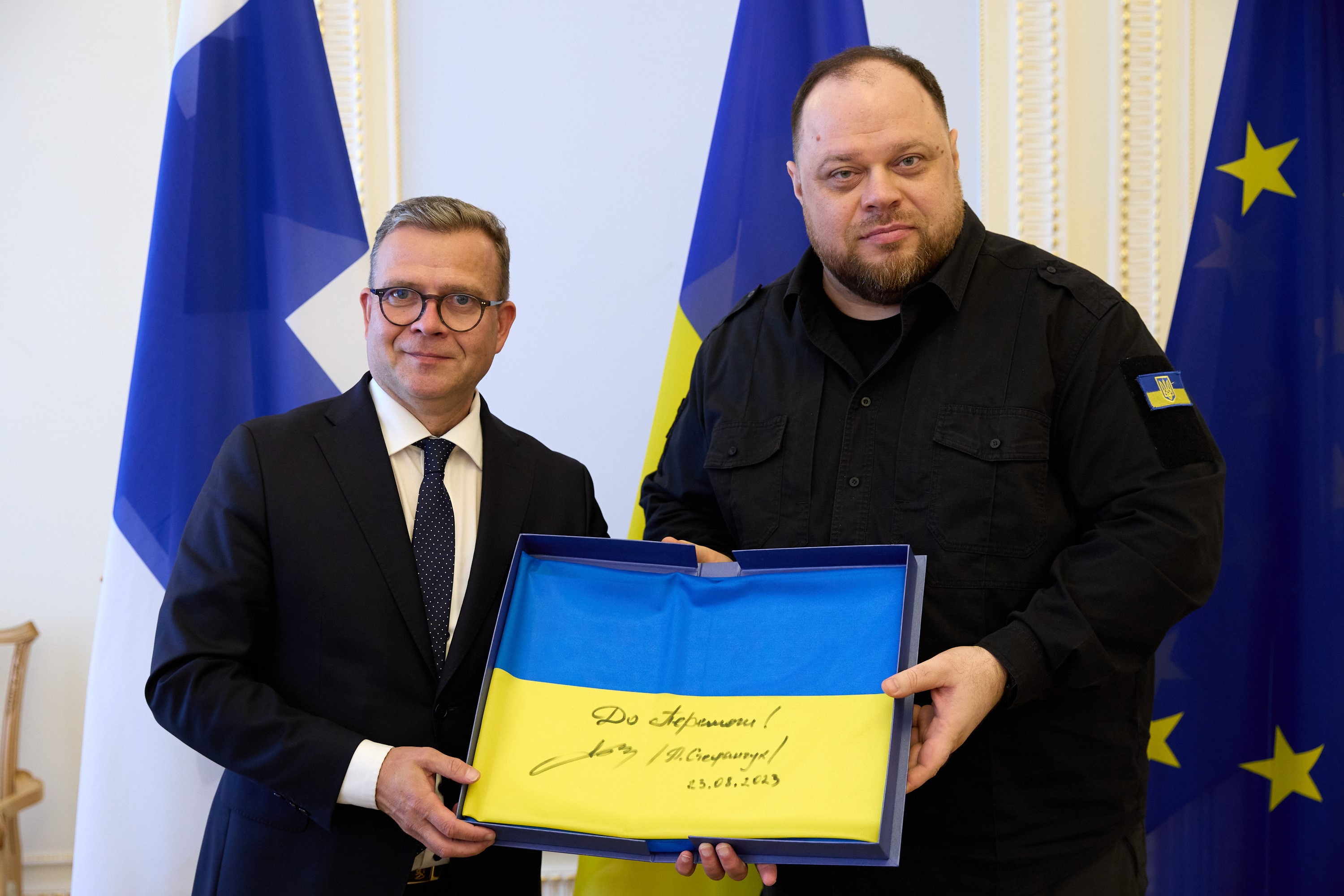
Finnish Prime Minister Petteri Orpo and the Chairman of the Verkhovna Rada Ruslan Stefanchuk meet in Kyiv, 23 August 2023.

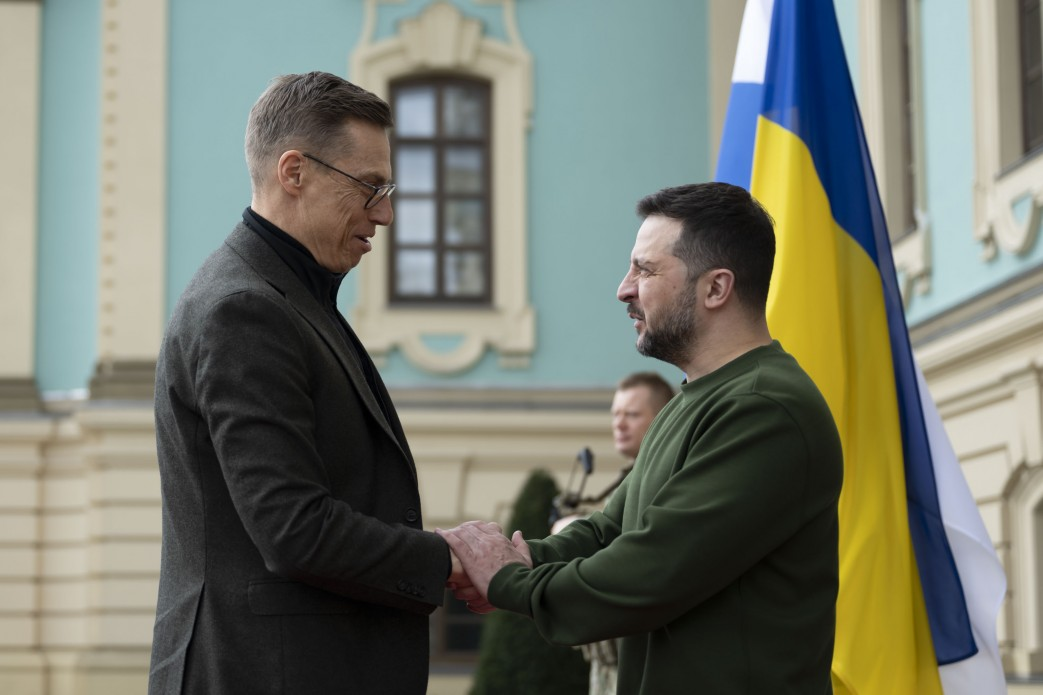
Finnish President Alexander Stubb with Ukrainian President Volodymyr Zelenskyy meet in 3 April 2024.

== See also ==
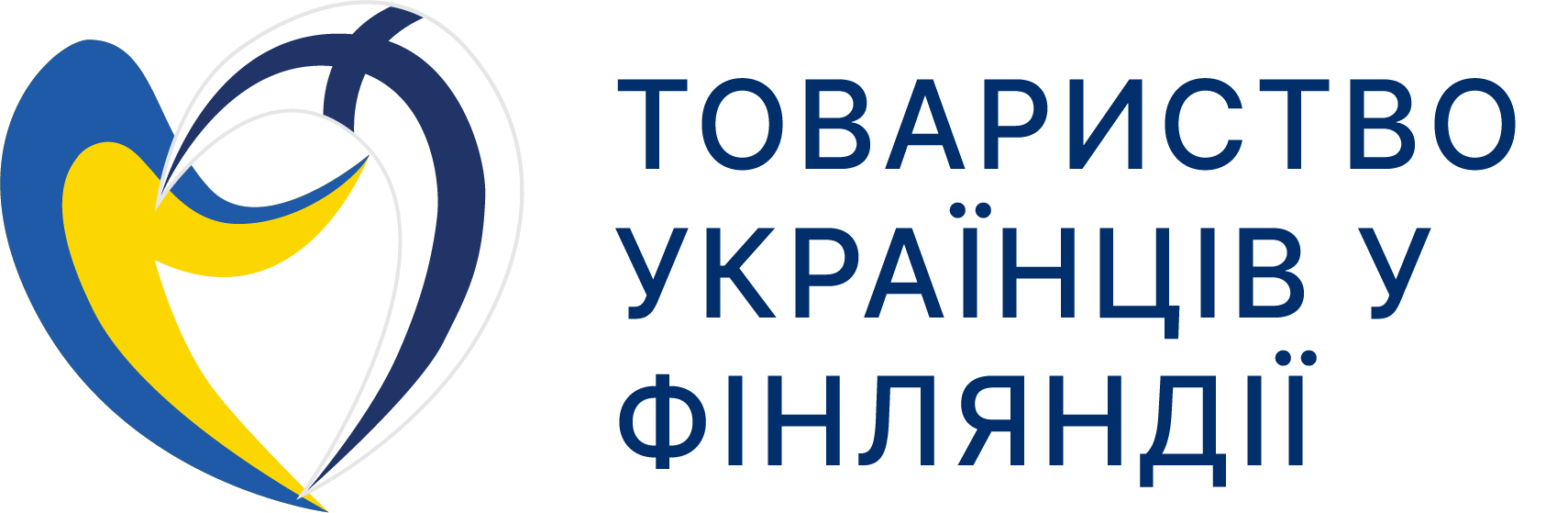
Ukrainian Association in Finland

- Foreign relations of Finland
- Foreign relations of Ukraine
- Ukrainians in Finland
- Coalition of the willing (Russo-Ukrainian war)
