= Inna Ohnivets =

Ukrainian jurist and diplomat

- Інна Огнівець
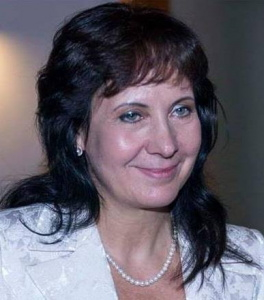
- Ohnivets in 2020

Ambassador of Ukraine to Portugal
- In office 19 October 2015 – 24 June 2022
- Preceded by: Oleksandr Nikonenko
- Succeeded by: Maryna Mykhailenko

Ambassador of Ukraine to Slovakia
- In office 30 December 2005 – 5 February 2010
- Preceded by: Serhiy Ustych
- Succeeded by: Oleh Havashi

Personal details
- Born: Inna Vasylivna Ohnivets; 30 August 1962 (age 64) Zhovti Vody, Dnipropetrovsk, Ukrainian SSR, Soviet Union
- Education: Taras Shevchenko National University of Kyiv; Kyiv National Linguistic University
- Occupation: Teacher, jurist and diplomat

Inna Vasylivna Ohnivets (Ukrainian: Інна Василівна Огнівець; born 30 August 1962) is a Ukrainian jurist and diplomat who became the ambassador to Slovakia from 2005 to 2010, and Portugal from 2015 to 2022. She currently serves as the head of Department for Ukrainians Worldwide and Humanitarian Cooperation.

== Early life and education ==
Ohnivets was born in Zhovti Vody, in the Dnipropetrovsk region of central Ukraine. She was an English and Spanish teacher as well as a jurist. She attended the Kyiv National Linguistic University and the University of Kiev. She started working as a professional in 1983, working as a lab assistant for the foreign language chair at the Military College of Higher Education of Kiev, Frunze. In 1993, she was appointed as Counselor of the Legal and Agreements Department's Section for State and Legal Affairs at the Ukrainian Ministry of Foreign Affairs.

== Diplomatic career ==
=== Slovakia ===
Ohnivets served as Ukraine's Extraordinary and Plenipotentiary Ambassador to the Slovak Republic from 2006 to 2010. According to the TASR newswire, On 20 August 2009, she informed journalists in Bratislava that the radiation output from the X-ray scanning system at the railway border crossing Uzhhorod-Matovce was dangerous. The ambassador reported that four Ukrainian workers' health had gotten worse and that both Slovak and Ukrainian authorities had taken many measurements at the border crossing that demonstrated the radiation from the scanner's harmful effects.

=== Portugal ===
Ohnivets has been in Lisbon since 30 September 2015 and was appointed by Petro Poroshenko.

Ohnivets made an urgent plea for cooperation in the fight to safeguard both people and the environment during her speech at the UN Conference in 2022 to support the implementation of Sustainable Development Goal 14. Regarding this, Ukraine was adamant about holding Russia accountable on a global scale for war crimes, damage of the marine environment, and illicit activity in the Black and Azov seas.

It is alleged that two pro-Russian workers at the refugee support centre improperly gathered and disseminated the private information of numerous immigrants. According to Ohnivets, the recorded personal data would be "of interest to Russian intelligence". During the interview, she reaffirmed the government's demand for a no-fly zone over Ukraine and condemned Russia for violating security protocols in the humanitarian corridors, specifically in Mariupol. She bemoaned the "scary state of affairs" in the city.

=== Dismissal ===
On 24 June 2022, Volodymyr Zelenskyy, the president of Ukraine, had dismissed five ambassadors, including Inna Ohnivets, the country's Ukrainian envoy, caused a stir in Portugal. She attempted to downplay any animosity in an interview with SIC, stating that this was a necessary and, in many ways, long overdue "planned rotation" of ambassadors (ambassadors typically serve three-year terms). Nevertheless, it seems that she was only informed that it was time to go two days prior to the public release of the presidential decree. On 23 September 2022, she stated that she was "very satisfied" with her performance and that she was able to make "successful" contacts at all levels.

Diplomatic posts
Preceded by Oleksandr Nikonenko	Ambassador of Ukraine to Portugal; 19 October 2015 – 24 June 2022	Succeeded by Maryna Mykhailenko
Preceded by Serhiy Ustych	Ambassador of Ukraine to Slovakia; 30 December 2005 – 5 February 2010	Succeeded by Oleh Havashi
