= Dmytro Pavlychko =

Ukrainian poet and politician (1929–2023)

Hero of Ukraine Dmytro Pavlychko
- Дмитро Павличко
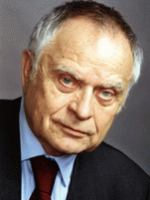
- Pavlychko in 2002

Ambassador of Ukraine to Poland
- In office 1999–2002
- President: Leonid Kuchma
- Preceded by: Petro Sardachuk
- Succeeded by: Oleksandr Nykonenko

Ambassador of Ukraine to Slovakia
- In office 1995–1998
- President: Leonid Kuchma
- Preceded by: Petro Sardachuk
- Succeeded by: Yuriy Rylach

People's Deputy of Ukraine
- In office 21 October 2005 – 2006
- Constituency: Our Ukraine Bloc, No. 99

People's Deputy of Ukraine
- In office 12 May 1998 – 17 March 1999
- Constituency: People's Movement of Ukraine, No. 33

People's Deputy of Ukraine
- In office 15 May 1990 – May 1994
- Constituency: Electoral district No.358 (Zbarazh)

Personal details
- Born: 28 September 1929 Stopchativ, Stanisławów Voivodeship, Poland (now Ukraine)
- Died: 29 January 2023 (aged 93) Kyiv, Ukraine
- Resting place: Stopchativ, Ukraine
- Relatives: Solomiia Pavlychko (daughter)
- Education: Lviv University
- Occupation: Poet; translator; scriptwriter; culturologist; political and public figure; diplomat

Military service
- Allegiance: Ukrainian Insurgent Army
- Years of service: April–June 1945
- Battles/wars: World War II; Anti-Soviet resistance by the Ukrainian Insurgent Army
- Writing career
- Genre: Poetry

Dmytro Vasylyovych Pavlychko (Ukrainian: Дмитро Васильович Павличко; 28 September 1929 – 29 January 2023) was a Ukrainian poet, translator, scriptwriter, culturologist, and politician.

Pavlychko published poetry and translations since the 1950s. His work came under censorship from the Soviet Government. Pavlychko, who had been imprisoned as a Ukrainian Nationalist following World War II, would work within the constraints of the Soviet state and become a well regarded author and William Shakespeare scholar in Russia and Ukraine.

Following the easing of censorship in the late 1980's, Pavlychko would help shape Ukrainian statehood. He entered politics and would co-create Ukraine's first independent political party. In 1990, he co-authored the "Declaration of State Sovereignty of Ukraine," declaring Ukrainian law overruled Soviet law.

Pavlychko was also a member of the Verkhovna Rada for two terms in the 1990s. He served as Ukraine's Ambassador to Slovakia and later to Poland.

== Biography ==
Dmytro Pavlychko, recognized as a hero of Ukraine, had a life reflective of many of his generation.

=== Early life ===
Dmytro Pavlychko was born on 28 September 1929 in a lumber worker family living in the village of Stopchativ near the Carpathian Mountains. Today this place is near the town of Yabluniv in Kosiv Raion, Ivano-Frankivsk Oblast. Pavlychko was schooled at a Polish language schoon in Yabluniv, and later attended a gymnasium in Kolomyia.

=== War and imprisonment ===
According to his own memoirs, in April 1945 Pavlychko became a member of the Ukrainian Insurgent Army (UPA), where he was known under the pseudonym "Doroshenko". Dmytro served with the UPA for three months. After his unit had been disbanded, he resumed his studies and wanted to enter the Komsomol, but in October, at the age of 16, was detained due to his previous UPA membership. Following an investigation, in summer 1946 Pavlychko was freed from imprisonment. Later Andriy Malyshko teasingly called Pavlychko a "Banderovite broth cook". In a collection of poetry, in his last published book “Poems from Maidan,” Pavylchko would call back to his time in the Ukrainian Insurgent Army.

=== Education and career ===
Originally Pavlychko planned to enroll at Kyiv University, but his application was denied. In 1953 Pavlychko graduated from Lviv University (Department of Philology) and from 1956 worked as head of the poetry department at Zhovten (now Dzvin) magazine. In 1962 Pavlychko attended the all-Union congress of Young Communists in Moscow. After moving to Kyiv, in 1964-1966 he was employed as a screenwriter at the Dovzhenko Film Studios, and in 1966-1968 worked at the office of the National Writers' Union of Ukraine. In 1970–1978 Pavlychko served as chief editor at Vsesvit ("Universe") magazine.

In 1986 Dmytro Pavlychko became secretary of the Writers' Union of the USSR. In 1988 he would become Secretary of the Writers' Union of Ukraine. Pavlychko led the Shevchenko Ukrainian Language Society in 1989-1990.

Pavlychko was an honorary Doctor of Science of Lviv and Warsaw Universities and professor of Kyiv-Mohyla Academy.

=== Political career ===
A member of the Communist Party of the Soviet Union from 1954 until 1990, Dmytro Pavlychko was active in Ukrainian politics during the Soviet era and after independence. In the late 1980s Dmytro Pavlychko was one of the founders of People's Movement of Ukraine (Rukh). Pavlychko noted that Rukh was formed by himself and other Communists such as Ivan Drach and Volodymyr Yavorivskyi when a membership in the Party remained desirable because Rukh united various political groups and forces, but was allowed to operate. Pavlychko officially left the Communist Party after Gorbachev and the rest of its leadership refused to recognize Lithuanian Independence.

In 1989-1991 he served as a people's deputy of the Soviet Union. Pavlychko was elected to the Supreme Soviet of the Ukrainian SSR in 1990 as the representative of Zbarazh electoral district. Between 1990 and 1994 he served as chairman of the Foreign Affairs Commission at the Verkhovna Rada and was a member of the "People's Council", heading the parliamentary fraction of the Democratic Party of Ukraine. As deputy, Pavlychko became one of the authors of the Declaration of State Sovereignty of Ukraine, which declared Ukraine's neutrality.

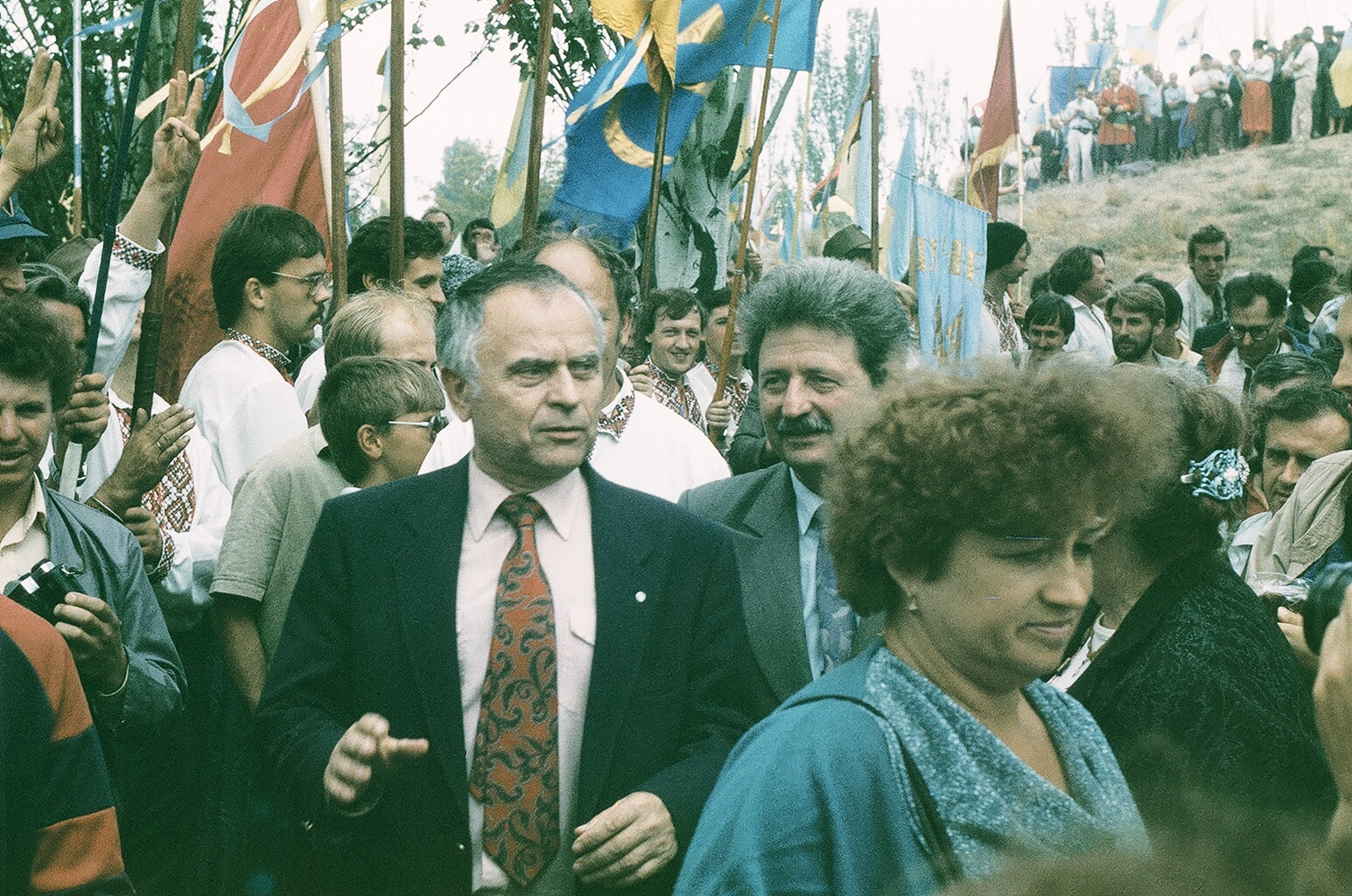
Pavlychko during the 500th anniversary of Zaporozhian Cossacks in 1990

Pavlychko participated in the renewal of the Prosvita Society, the Taras Shevchenko Ukrainian language society. Dmytro Pavlychko would help organize and lead the 500th anniversary of the Zaporozhian Sich celebrations in 1990. The previous year in June, Dr. Olena Apanovych led an expedition to the Zaporozhian Sich on behalf of the Ukrainian Society for the Preservation of Monuments. Apanovych approached Rukh about organizing the event. Pavlychko would lead the event and encourage Rukh's political Western Base to travel to Southeastern Ukraine to celebrate the Cossack as a universal National symbol.

Pavlychko co-authored the Act on Independence of Ukraine which declared the Independence of Ukraine. which was approved on 24 August 1991. On December 1 a referendum was held and the declaration was affirmed by a majority of Ukrainians in all regions of Ukraine by a Ukrainian independence led to the dissolution of the Soviet Union.

In 1994 Pavlychko ran for parliament as a candidate in Chyhyryn electoral district, but failed to gain enough votes. Between October 1995 and May 1998 he served as the ambassador of Ukraine to Slovakia. In 1998 Pavlychko was once again elected to the Verkhovna Rada, representing the People's Movement of Ukraine, and served as deputy until 17 March 1999. Between 26 February 1999 and 11 January 2002 he served as Ukraine's ambassador in Poland.

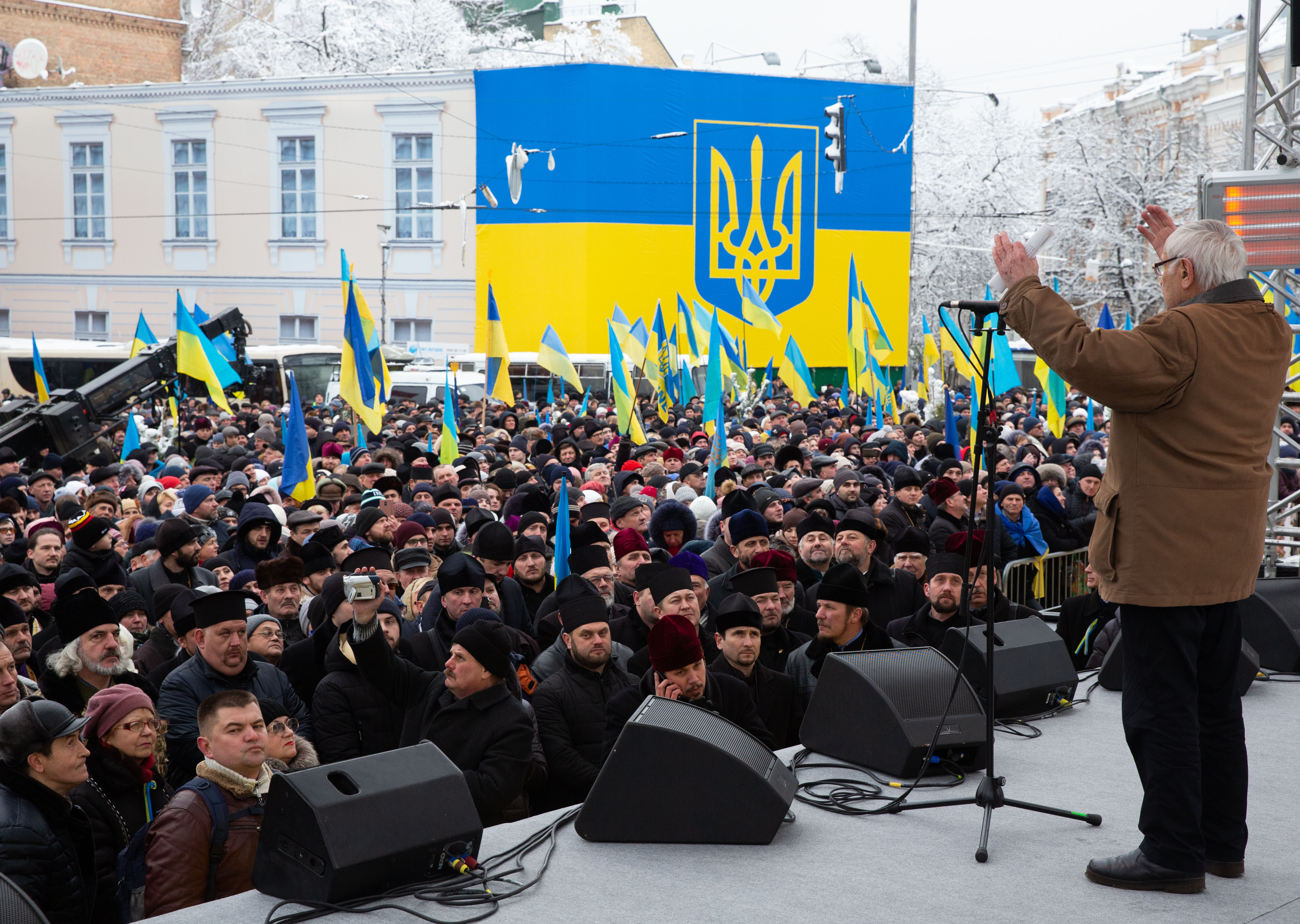
Pavlychko speaking during the Unification council of the Orthodox Church of Ukraine in 2018

In 2002 Pavlychko ran for parliament as a candidate of the Our Ukraine Bloc, but failed to get elected. In October 2005 he became a deputy of Verkhovna Rada as next in the party list. Pavlychko ran as a candidate from the Ukrainian People's Bloc in the 2006 Ukrainian parliamentary election, but didn't get enough votes. In August of the same year he headed the Ukrainian Worldwide Coordination Council. In 2012 Pavlychko ran for parliament as candidate from Batkivshchyna, but failed to win a seat. In 2014 he was a candidate from Petro Poroshenko Bloc in that year's election, but once again remained unelected.

=== Death ===
Pavlychko died on 29 January 2023 in Kyiv at the age of 93, and was buried on 31 January in his native village Stopchativ.

== Personal life ==
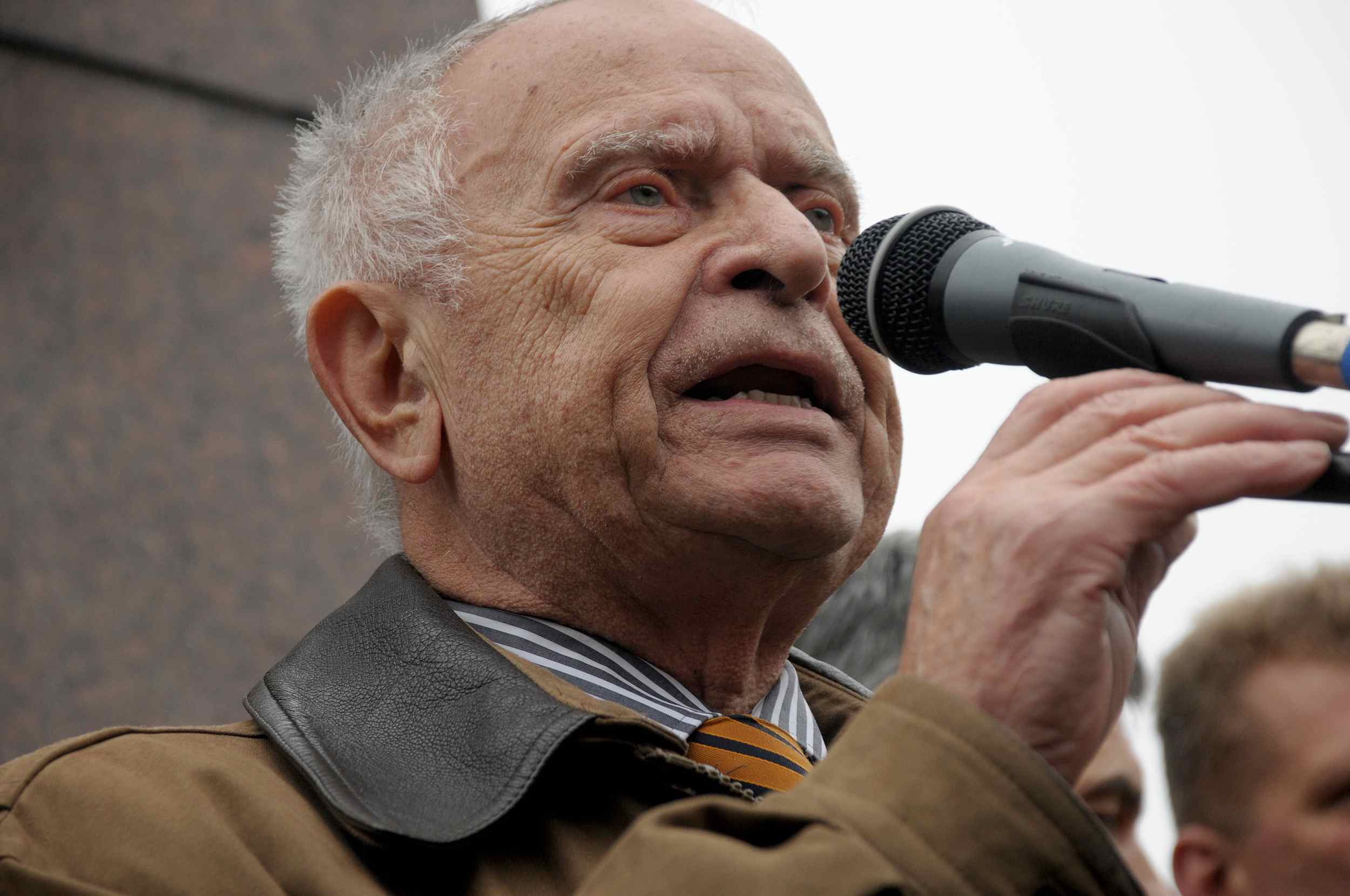
Pavlychko in 2012

His daughter was Solomiia Pavlychko (1958–1999).

== Artistic impact ==
In his poetry works of Soviet period, first of which "Love and hatred" published in 1953, Pavlychko presented himself as publicist and civil activist. He is known for presenting paradoxes such as love and hate through antonymic pairs, unlike things in a metaphor. This created an opposition in the literary subject of many poems. Pavlychko would note for example, "Interwoven like my mother's sewing, My sad and joyful ways,". This use of opposites created a sense of irony and humor in much of his work. Critic Askold Melnyczuk noted that Pavlychko used direct and plain spoken language to combine themes of love and history as a poetic Statesmen.

According to literary critic Ivan Dziuba, Dmytro Pavlychko started what would become the dissident movement in Ukraine. In 1957-58 Pavlychko's poetry collection “Pravda klyche” (The Truth Calls) was confiscated and banned for breaking political norms of the Stalin era. In later interviews Pavlychko would note that his experience with "Pravda klyche" leade him to abandon the Communist Party, and that he was a member in name only for political reasons to protect the Ukrainian Language. He would note in his younger years he had hoped the Party could be a path to an Independent Ukraine. Pavlychko said in 1992:

I would have much greater opportunities to work for the preservation of the Ukrainian language and the Ukrainian culture. And this was the basis of my Party membership.

Through the 1960s Pavlychko's work remained controversial. His best known work in 1964 “Dva koliory,” or Two Colors. It was immediately censored as promoting Ukrainian Nationalism. Many of Pavlychko's poems were used for songs. In 1968 Dmytro Pavlychko wrote an article about poet Bohdan Ihor Antonych and the book "Hranoslov" that lead to calls for his ouster from the Communist party.

Besides writing his own verses, he also translated the poems of Dante Alighieri, Francesco Petrarca, Michelangelo, William Shakespeare, José Martí, and Nikola Vaptsarov, among others.

Dmytro Pavlychko was awarded the Shevchenko National Prize in 1977 for Love and Hatred.

On October 24, 2019, the National Museum of Literature of Ukraine hosted an anniversary evening dedicated to the 90th anniversary of Dmytro Pavlychko, where the fifth and sixth (last) volumes of his memoirs were presented.

== Awards and honors ==
- Order of the Red Banner of Labour (1960)
- Order of the Badge of Honour (1967)
- Shevchenko National Prize (1977)
- Order of Friendship of Peoples (1979)
- International Botev Prize (1986)
- Order of Merit (Ukraine), 3rd class (1997)
- Order of Prince Yaroslav the Wise, 5th class (1999)
- Antonovych prize (2004)
- Hero of Ukraine (2004)
- Order of Prince Yaroslav the Wise, 4th class (2009)
- Order of Liberty (Ukraine) (2015)

== Published works ==
- Lyubov i nenavist ("Love and hatred"), 1953.
- Moya zemlya ("My land"), 1953.
- Chorna nytka ("Black thread"), 1958.
- Pravda klyche ("Truth is calling"), 1958.
- Granoslov, 1968.
- Sonety podilskoy oseny ("Podillian autumn sonnets"), 1973.
- Taemnytsya tvogo oblychchia ("Mystery of your face"), 1974, 1979.
- Magistralyamy slova ("Through word's highways"), literary criticism, 1978.
- Nad glybynamy ("Upon the depths"), literary criticism, 1984.
- Spiral, 1984.
- Poemy i pritchi ("Poems and parables"), 1986.
- Bilya muzhniogo slova ("Next to the courageous word"), literary criticism, 1988.
- Pokayanni psalmy ("Repentance psalms"), 1994.
- World sonnets (translation), 1983.

== Books ==
- Dmytro Vasylovych Pavlychko. (2004). Ukrainska Natsionalna Ideia : Statti, Vystupy, Interv'iu, Dokumenty, Vyd-vo Solomii Pavlychko Osnovy. ISBN 978-966-500-124-9.
- Dmytro Vasylovych Pavlychko. (2002). Naperstok : Poezii, Vyd-vo Solomii Pavlychko Osnovy. ISBN 978-966-500-227-7.
- Dmytro Vasylovych Pavlychko. (2002). Ukrainska Natsionalna Ideia, Vydavnychyi dim KM Akademiia. ISBN 978-966-518-172-9.
- Dmytro Vasylovych Pavlychko. (1988). Bilia Muzhnoho Svitla : Literaturno-Krytychni Statti, Spohady, Vystupy, Rad. pysmennyk. ISBN 978-5-333-00026-2.
