= List of ambassadors of Ukraine to Finland =

Ambassador of Ukraine to Finland

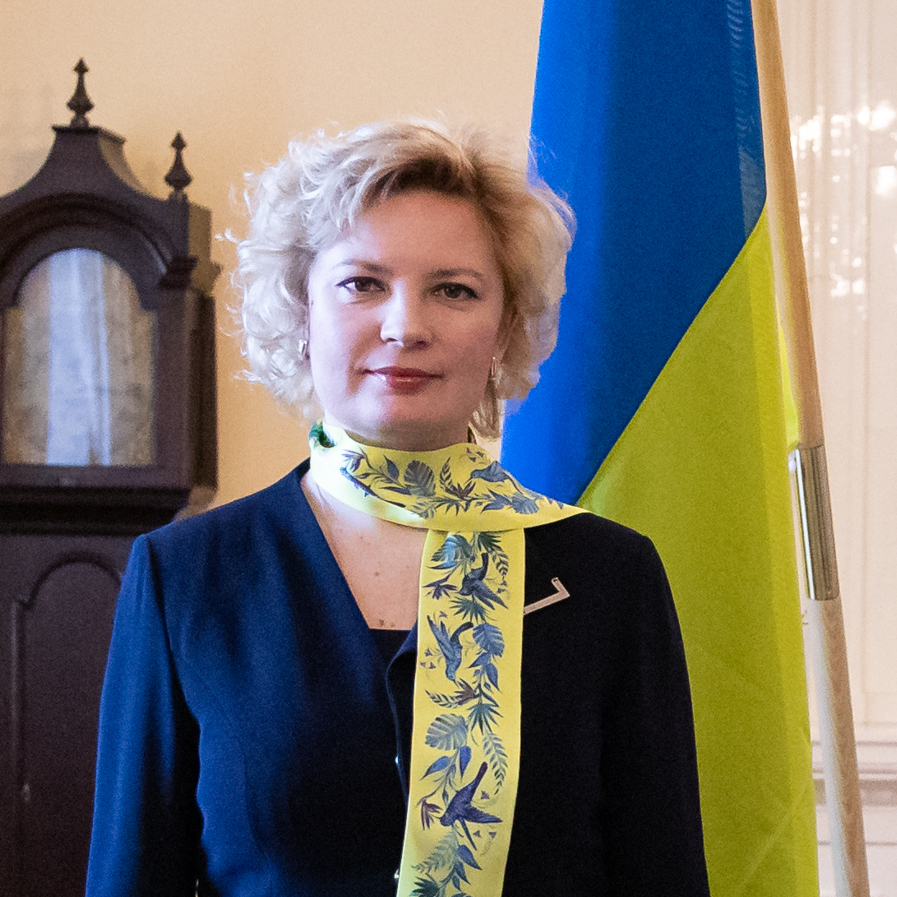
- Incumbent; Olga Dibrova since 19 October 2020
- Inaugural holder: Kostyantyn Masyk as Ambassador Extraordinary and Plenipotentiary
- Formation: 16 October 1992 (Presidential Ukase #501/92)
- Website: Ukraine Embassy - Helsinki

The Ambassador Extraordinary and Plenipotentiary of Ukraine to Finland (Ukrainian: Надзвичайний і Повноважний посол України в Фінляндії) is the ambassador of Ukraine to Finland. The current ambassador is Olga Dibrova. She assumed the position on 19 October 2020.

The first Ukrainian ambassador to Finland assumed his post in 1992, the same year a Ukrainian embassy opened in Helsinki.

== List of ambassadors ==
=== Ukrainian People's Republic ===
- 1918–1919 – Kostiantyn Losky
- 1919 – Mykola Zalizniak
- 1919–1920 – Volodymyr Kedrowsky
- 1920–1922 – Petro Slyvenko

=== Ukraine ===
- 1993–1997 – Kostyantyn Masyk (Ambassador of Ukraine to Finland and concurrently to Sweden)
- 1997–2001 – Ihor Podolyev
- 2001–2003 – Petro Sardachuk
- 2003–2007 – Oleksandr Maidannyk
- 2007–2012 – Andrii Deshchytsia
- 2012–2013 – Oleksiy Selin (acting)
- 2013–2014 – Serhey Vasylenko (acting)
- 20 August 2014–16 May 2019 – Andrii Olefirov
- 2019–2020 – Ilya Kvas (acting)
- 2020–2020 – Mykhailo Yunger (acting)
- Since 19 October 2020 – Olga Dibrova
