= Doroshenko =

Doroshenko is a Ukrainian surname and a village name. The surname and village may refer to:

- Anatoliy Doroshenko (born 1953), Soviet-Ukrainian footballer
- Andrey Doroshenko (born 1977), Russian politician
- Andrii Doroshenko (born 1987), Ukrainian Paralympic sport shooter
- Dmytro Doroshenko (1882–1951), Ukrainian politician
- Kyrylo Doroshenko (born 1989), Ukrainian footballer
- Kostyantyn Doroshenko (born 1972), Ukrainian art critic and curator
- Maryna Doroshenko (1981–2014), Ukrainian basketballer
- Mykhailo Doroshenko (?–1628), Cossack leader
- Oleksandr Doroshenko (born 1981), Ukrainian Paralympian athlete
- Peter Doroshenko (born 1962), Ukrainian-American art curator
- Petro Doroshenko (1627–1698), Cossack leader
- Vitali Doroshenko (born 1971), Russian footballer
- Vitalii Doroshenko (born 1994), Ukrainian-Portuguese footballer
- Yuri Doroshenko (born 1980), Ukrainian-Russian footballer

== See also ==
- Doroshenko family
