= Olga Dibrova =

Ukrainian diplomat (born 1977)

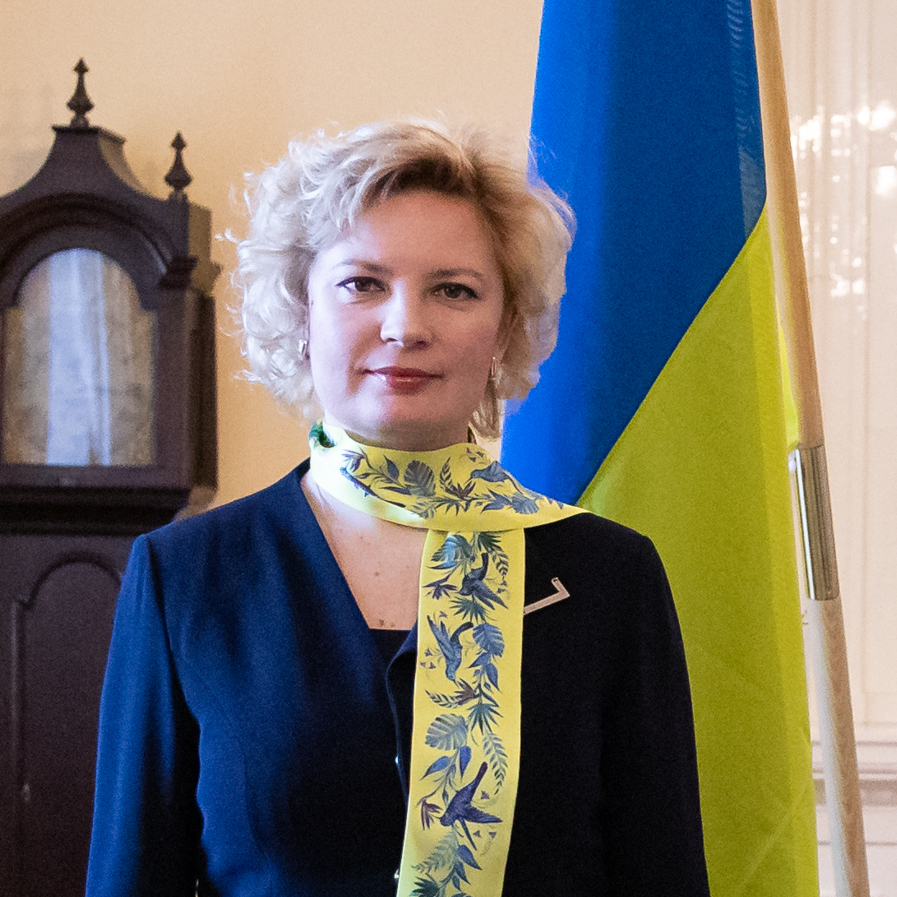
- Born: 10 March 1977 (age 49); Kryvyi Rih
- Education: Kyiv National Taras Shevchenko University.
- Occupation: Ambassador
- Employer: Ministry of Foreign Affairs of Ukraine

Olga Oleksandrivna Dibrova (Ukrainian: Ольга Олександрівна Діброва; born 10 March 1977) Ukraine's Ambassador to Finland (2020-2025).

== Life ==
Dibrova was born in Kryvyi Rih on 10 March 1977. She had her university education at the Kyiv National Taras Shevchenko University. In 1999, she graduated from its School of Oriental Studies. The following year she graduated from their Department of Journalism when she was already an Attaché of the Ukraine's Ministry of Foreign Affairs. Dibrova has a knowledge of several languages and she is fluent in Turkish and English.

She became the Ambassador Extraordinary and Plenipotentiary of Ukraine to Finland on 19 October 2020. In November 2021, she was also made her country's part-time Ambassador to Iceland.

On 24 February 2022 Russia invaded Ukraine. Dibrova spoke of the support that her country needed after the invasion, including weapons, medicine, humanitarian aid and finance. In March 2022, she was invited by ex-Prime Minister and current Speaker of the Parliament of Finland Matti Vanhanen to a plenary session of the Finnish parliament, where she received a standing ovation. Vanhanen told her of the parliament's support for Ukraine and condemnation of the invasion. In that month she also joined 4,000 people who marched to Parliament to express their support for Ukraine.

On Easter Monday 2022 she was speaking at an event protesting at the invasion of Ukraine with Foreign Minister Pekka Haavisto and Helsinki's Deputy Mayor Daniel Sazonov.

Ukraine's First Lady, Olena Zelenska, initiated the project “Books without borders” in 2022. 260,000 books in Ukrainian were printed for children who had left their homes and found shelter in 20 countries.

The “Ukrainian bookshelf” provides for the distribution of Ukrainian literature and its translations in the world's leading libraries. More than 20 countries joined the initiative and in January 2025 Dibrova was at Lahti's main library to celebrate the books there.
