= Bullet (UAV) =

Ukrainian unmanned aerial vehicle

General information
- Type: Interceptor drone
- National origin: Ukraine
- Manufacturer: LLC "Research Center of Unmanned Systems"
- Designer: General Chereshnya
- Primary user: Armed Forces of Ukraine

History
- Introduction date: 2025

The Bullet is a Ukrainian interceptor unmanned aerial vehicle (UAV) developed by the General Chereshnya company. It is specifically designed to counter and neutralize enemy attack and reconnaissance drones, including the Shahed 136.

== History ==
The Bullet was introduced in 2025, following a development collaboration with units of the Ukrainian Defense Forces, who provided the initial technical requirements. General Chereshnya engineers subsequently adapted the drone's design and software to meet active combat conditions. Following the conclusion of field testing, the company commenced mass production of the UAV on 20 October 2025.

By November 2025, the company released the first combat footage verifying the successful interception of Shahed-type strike drones.

On 8 December 2025, Defense Express reported that the Ministry of Defense of Ukraine had officially codified the Bullet and assigned it a NATO Stock Number (NSN). This designation allowed government procurement agencies to centrally purchase the platform for the armed forces. Following its codification, the drone became available on the domestic military marketplaces Brave1 Market and DOT-Chain Defense.

== Design and technical characteristics ==
The Bullet utilizes a tail-sitter vertical take-off and landing (VTOL) aerodynamic configuration. It launches and lands vertically, transitioning to horizontal flight after gaining altitude. The drone features an elongated, projectile-like fuselage and is powered by an electric powerplant driving four rotors.

Operators control the UAV via a ground control station and a dedicated control panel. For target detection and guidance, the platform relies on an onboard computing module equipped with an artificial intelligence (AI) targeting system.

== Modifications ==
The platform is available in four primary configurations based on its optical and video transmission systems:

- Day camera with an analog video system
- Day camera with a digital video system
- Night thermal-imaging camera with an analog video system
- Night thermal-imaging camera with a digital video system

Any of these variants can be optionally integrated with an AI-driven data processing module. During the development phase, the manufacturer tested several design iterations concurrently, providing them to Ukrainian defense units for comparative field evaluations.

In April 2026, General Chereshnya introduced an updated iteration of the Bullet platform. This version features an optimized fuselage refined through combat feedback, compatibility with remote launch and control systems, and a reduced deployment preparation time of one minute.

== Combat use ==
During the fall of 2025, General Chereshnya donated hundreds of Bullet interceptors—valued at more than 20 million Ukrainian hryvnias (UAH)—to more than 20 defense units for combat trials.

By late November 2025, the manufacturer confirmed the first video-documented combat victories against Shahed attack UAVs. Combined operations using both the Bullet and AIR interceptors accounted for dozens of downed "Shahed-like" drones by December 2025. By early 2026, a company representative stated that the Bullet platform had successfully intercepted several hundred enemy Shahed drones.
