= Yabluniv settlement hromada =

Settlement hromada of Ivano-Frankivsk Oblast, Ukraine

Yabluniv settlement hromada Яблунівська селищна громада
- Hromada
- Interactive map of Yabluniv settlement hromada
- Country: Ukraine
- Oblast: Ivano-Frankivsk
- Raion: Kosiv

Area
  - Total: 206.5 km^{2} (79.7 sq mi)

Population (2023)
  - Total: 16,618
  - Density: 80.47/km^{2} (208.4/sq mi)
- Settlements: 11
- Villages: 10
- Towns: 1
- Website: yablunivska-gromada.gov.ua

Yabluniv settlement territorial hromada (Ukrainian: Яблунівська селищна територіальна громада, romanized: Yablunivska selyshchna terytorialna hromada) is one of the hromadas of Ukraine, located in Kosiv Raion within the western Ivano-Frankivsk Oblast. Its administrative centre is the urban-type settlement of Yabluniv.

The hromada has a size of 206.5 km^{2} (79.7 mi^{2}). Its population is 16,618 (as of 2023).

Prior to assuming its current form, the hromada was first established as an amalgamated hromada on 29 October 2017. It was expanded to its current form in 2020 as part of decentralisation in Ukraine.

== Composition ==
In addition to one urban-type settlement (Yabluniv), there are ten villages in Yabluniv settlement hromada:

- Akreshory
- Bania-Bereziv
- Liucha
- Liuchky
- Nyzhnii Bereziv
- Serednii Bereziv
- Stopchativ
- Tekucha
- Utoropy
- Vyzhnii Bereziv
