= List of ambassadors of Ukraine to Slovakia =

Ambassador of Ukraine to Slovakia

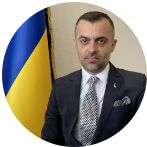
- Incumbent; Myroslav Kastran since October 2022
- Nominator: Volodymyr Zelenskyy
- Inaugural holder: Roman Lubkivsky as Ambassador Extraordinary and Plenipotentiary
- Formation: September 1992
- Website: Ukraine Embassy - Bratislava

The Ambassador Extraordinary and Plenipotentiary of Ukraine to Slovakia (Ukrainian: Надзвичайний і Повноважний посол України в Словаччині) is the ambassador of Ukraine to Slovakia. The current ambassador is Myroslav Kastran. He assumed the position in October 2022.

The first Ukrainian ambassador to Slovakia assumed his post in 1992, the same year a Ukrainian embassy opened in Bratislava.

== List of representatives ==
- 1992–1993 – Roman Lubkivsky
- 1993–1995 – Petro Sardachuk
- 1995–1998 – Dmytro Pavlychko
- 1998–2004 – Yuriy Rylach
- 2004–2005 – Serhiy Ustych
- 2005–2010 – Inna Ohnivets
- 2010 – Ivan Kholostenko (Charge d'Affairs)
- 2010–2016 – Oleh Havashi
- 2016–2022 – Yuriy Mushka
- Since 2022 – Myroslav Kastran

== See also ==
- Ukrainian Embassy, Bratislava
- Ambassador of Slovakia to Ukraine
