= Stopchativ =

Rural locality in Ivano-Frankivsk Oblast, Ukraine

Stopchativ Стопчатів
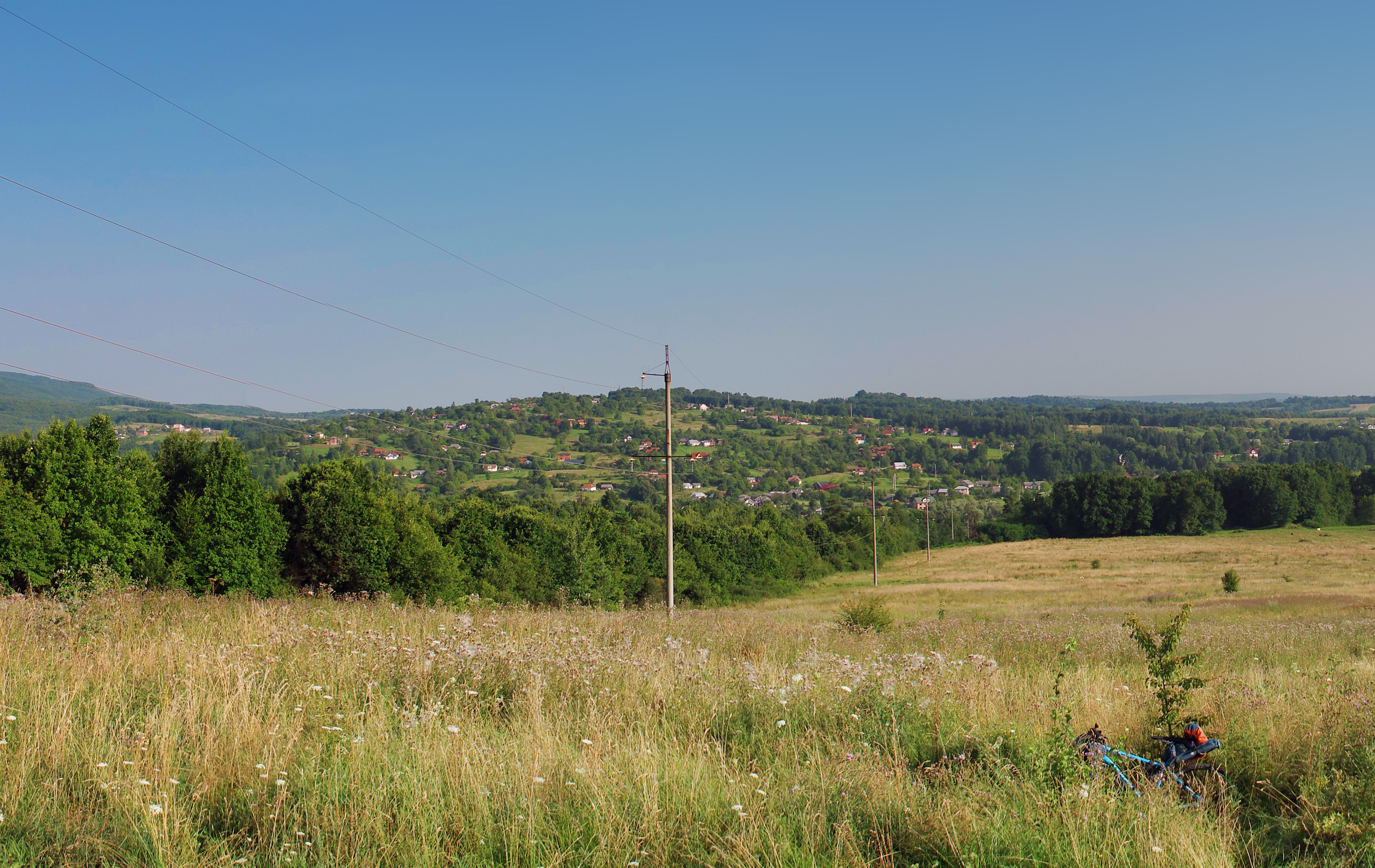
- Stopchativ, Ukraine visible from the village of Utoropy

- Location in Ivano-Frankivsk Oblast
- Coordinates: 48°25′1″N 24°58′28″E
- Country: Ukraine
- Oblast: Ivano-Frankivsk Oblast
- Raion: Kosiv Raion
- Hromada: Yabluniv settlement hromada
- Time zone: UTC+2 (EET)
  - Summer (DST): UTC+3 (EEST)
- Postal code: 78620

Stopchativ (Ukrainian: Стопчатів; Polish: Stopczatów) is a village in Yabluniv settlement hromada, Kosiv Raion, Ivano-Frankivsk Oblast, Ukraine.

== History ==
The first written mention dates from 1515.

== Religion ==
There are three churches in the village: St. Nicholas, St. Paraskeva, and the Nativity of the Blessed Virgin Mary.

== Notable residents ==
- Dmytro Pavlychko (1929–2023), Ukrainian poet, translator, scriptwriter, culturologist, and politician

== Sources ==
- "Stopczatów". Geographical Dictionary of the Kingdom of Poland (in Polish). 11. Warszawa: Kasa im. Józefa Mianowskiego. 1890. p. 371.
