= Anatoliy Shevchuk =

Ukrainian art historian

Anatoliy Mefodіyovich Shevchuk (25 December 1954 – 31 March 2011) is a historian of Ukrainian fine art, writer, and translator.

== Biography ==
Anatoliy Mefodіyovich Shevchuk was born 24 December 1954 in the small town of Romanіv, Zhytomyrshchyna. After graduating from Dzerzhynsk high school, he entered Pedagogical University and studied at the Faculty of Foreign Languages. During his student years, first and foremost he was interested a series of lectures on linguistics. He was especially impressed by the course of lexicology lectures delivered by Assistant Professor of Ukrainian Language and future Doctor of Philology D. Kveselevich, and lectures of stylistics delivered by next Candidate of Philological Sciences V. Sasіna.

He worked as a military translator for 17 years. Soon Mefodіyovich headed the department of fine and applied art in Zhytomyr College of Culture and Arts named after Hilarion Ohienko, and became a lecturer of English language in Zhytomyr Agroecological University.

He died at 57 years old on March 31, 2011.

Vіtalіy Pravditskiy, one of his followers, is the present director of Chervonoarmiisk museum "Pulinskі barvi". On his own initiative and support of Shevchuk's widow, Mrs. Vanda Chaykovska, art exhibition from private collection of Shevchuk's, were opened in the "Pulinskі barvi" museum.

== Art and translation work ==
Fired up with creative energy of his lecturers, Shevchuk dedicated himself to perfecting the mastery of English language teaching. He introduced creative innovations and technologies into the English curriculum of high schools of culture and art, created tutorial "Ukrainian Folklore for Pupils and Students of Higher Schools" and received a financing grant for this tutorial from the U.S. Embassy’s commission of experts of the press, education and culture department.

Two tutorials classified by the Ministry of Education and Science of Ukraine were published throughout 4 years – "English through Native Tales and the Ukrainian Diaspora of America" and "Our Living English". Moreover, he published some linguistic articles in the magazine Foreign Languages in Scholastic Institutions, in which Shevchuk reports creative work of Patritsіya Pollako, modern American children's writer.

His published works include an essay dedicated to the 70 year anniversary of D. Kveselevich 's birth – "On the Linguistic Waves Millennium", articles "Wіslava Shimborska in Ukrainian Perspective" and "Come into Integrated World of Earth" are worthy of note. Art translation analysis problems of Ukrainian writer's works into English were the object of his scientific investigations.

In 2002, Shevchuk founded literary and artistic series "Butterfly" attached to Zhytomyr publishing firm "Polіssya" where his ethnic stories in Ukrainian, Polish and English had been published for 5 years. He was a founder of academic conference; "Ethnoculture and Identity: Looking for a Bridge to English" in 2009. He was also an active member of academic conferences organized by the linguistics Institute named after Alexander Potebnja and the Institute of Art Criticism, Folklore Study and Ethnology named after Maksym Rylsky.

There are more than 120 articles about history and critique of Ukrainian applied and fine art in Mefodіyovich's cultural heritage. They were published in the leading Ukrainian magazines and scientific collected works. There is his well-known monograph "Ukrainian Fine Art: Search after the Truth" and album Oleksіy Makarenko written in co-authorship with Vanda Chaykovska and published in Ukrainian and English.

== Works ==
- Chicken egg/ Anatoliy Shevchuk: tale in Ukrainian and Polish = Prawdziwa bajka o kurzym jajku / Anatolij Szewczuk
- Ukrainian folklore: For pupils and students of higher school /Shevchuk A.M. - p. 173.
- Vasylyna, Myckola and He-who-Sits-under-the-Hearth/ Anatoly M. Shevchuk.
- Beauty in Clay/ Anatoly M. Shevchuk.
- English through Native Tales and the Ukrainian Diaspora of America /Shevchuk, A.M. – p. 170.

== Sources ==
- "Logos Ukraine"
- Yurіy Gudz
- Memory's codes
