= Embassy of Ukraine, Helsinki =

Embassy of Ukraine in the Republic of Finland

Embassy of Ukraine in the Republic of Finland
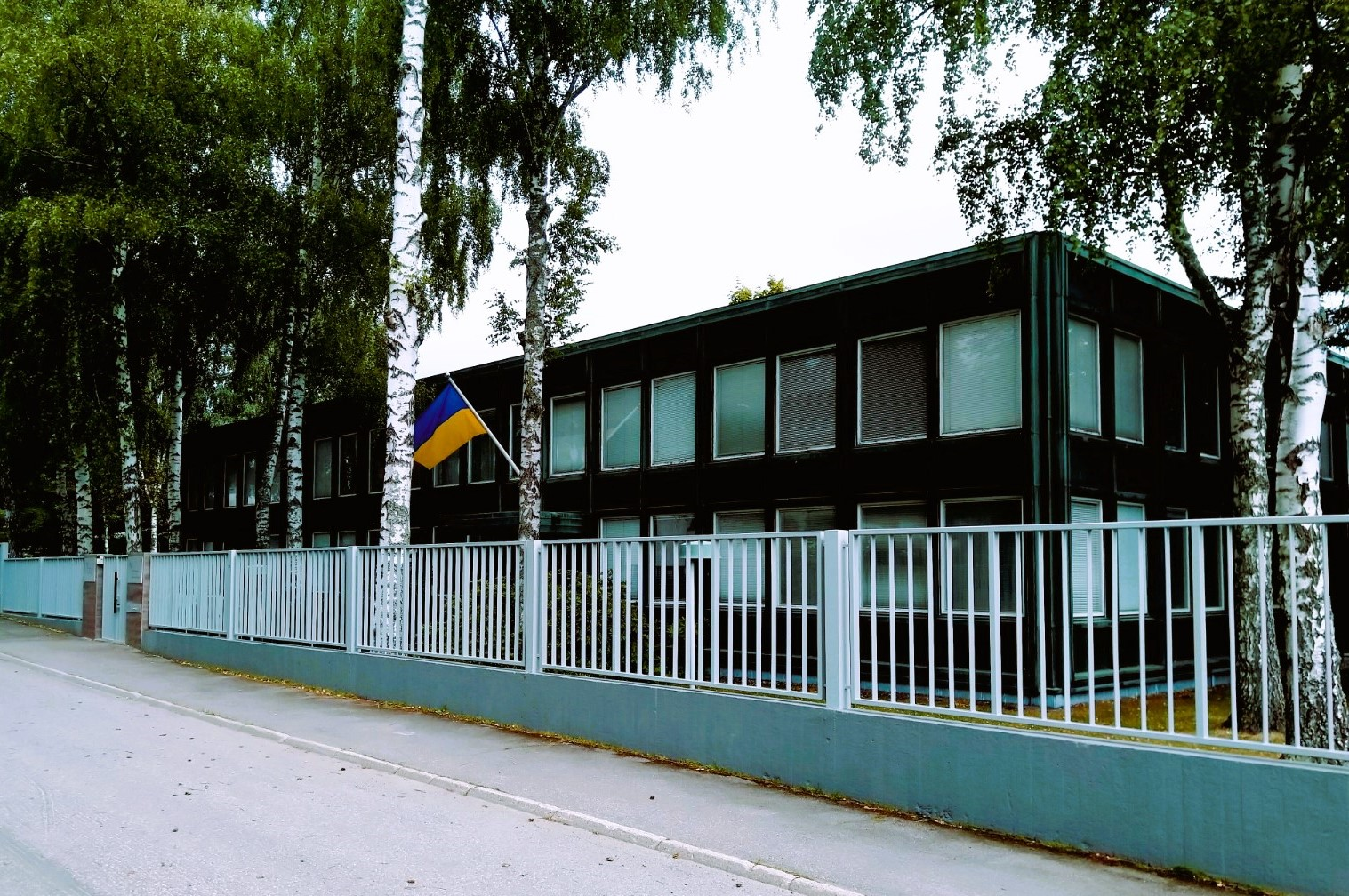
- Location: Kulosaari, Helsinki, Finland
- Address: Vähäniityntie 9, 00570, Helsinki, Finland
- Ambassador: Olha Dibrowa since 2020
- Website: Official Website

The Embassy of Ukraine in Helsinki is the diplomatic mission of Ukraine in Helsinki, Finland.

== History of the diplomatic relations ==
Finland was one of the first countries which recognized Ukraine in 1918 and opened its diplomatic mission in Kyiv. The Ukrainian diplomatic mission was established among the first six foreign embassies in Helsinki. Later history of two countries went by different ways: Finland managed to hold its independence, but Ukraine has become a part of the Soviet Union for a long time.

Finland recognized the independence of Ukraine on December 30, 1991. Diplomatic relations between two countries were established on February 26, 1992. The Finnish Embassy in Ukraine has begun its work on April 1, 1992, the Ukrainian Embassy in Finland – on December 18, of the same year.

== Heads of diplomatic missions ==
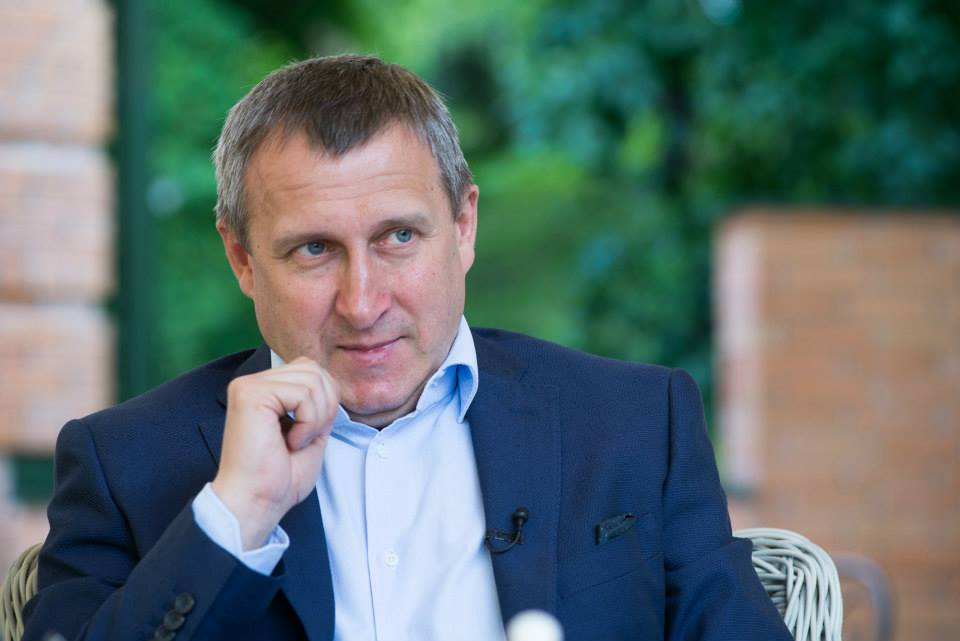
Andrii Deshchytsia ambassador of Ukraine in the Republic of Finland, (2007—2012)

1. Kost Losky (1918—1919)
2. Mykola Zheleznyak (1919)
3. Volodymyr Kedrowsky (1919—1920)
4. Peter Slivenko (1920—1922)
5. Kostyantyn Masyk (1992—1997)
6. Ihor Podolev (1997—2001)
7. Peter Sardachuk (2001—2003)
8. Oleksandr Maidannik(2003—2007)
9. Andrii Deshchytsia (2007—2012)
10. Oleksey Selin (2012—2013)
11. Serhiy Vasylenko (2013—2014)
12. Andrei Olefinov (2014—2019)
13. Ilia Kvas (2019—2020)
14. Mikhailo Iunher (2020)
15. Olha Dibrowa (2020-)

== See also ==
- Finland–Ukraine relations
- List of diplomatic missions in Finland
- Foreign relations of Finland
- Foreign relations of Ukraine
