= Matovce =

- Municipality
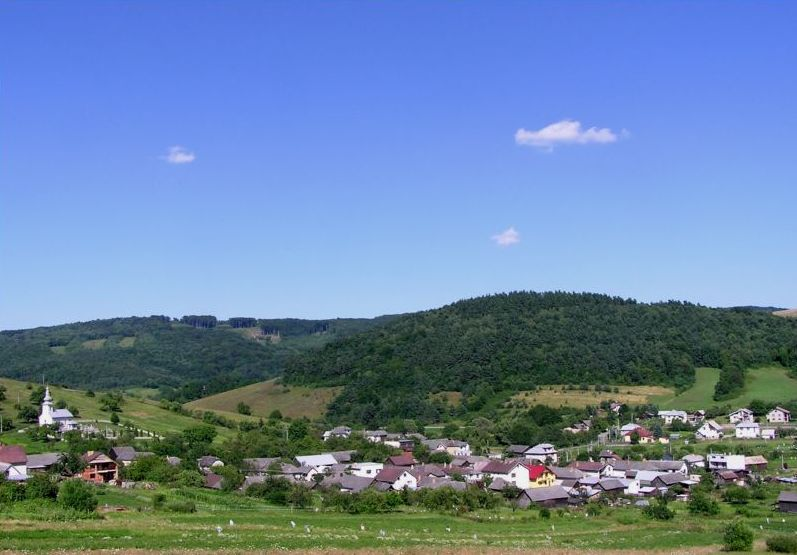

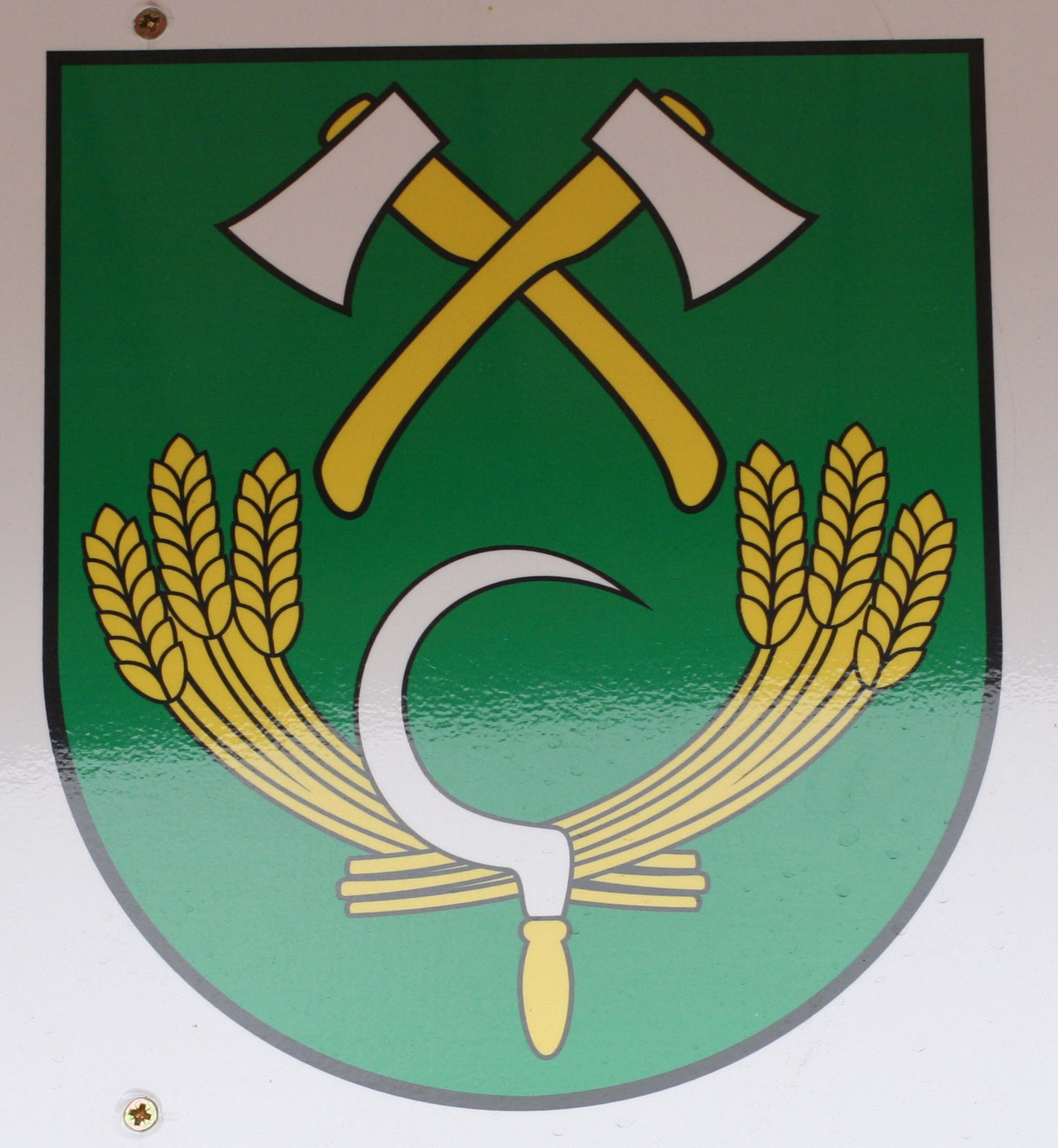
- Flag Coat of arms

- Location of Matovce in the Prešov Region Location of Matovce in Slovakia
- Coordinates: 49.13°N 21.55°E
- Country: Slovakia
- Region: Prešov Region
- District: Svidník District
- First mentioned: 1423

Area
  - Total: 4.01 km^{2} (1.55 sq mi)
- Elevation: 196 m (643 ft)

Population (2025)
  - Total: 124
- Time zone: UTC+1 (CET)
  - Summer (DST): UTC+2 (CEST)
- Postal code: 904 2
- Area code: +421 54
- Vehicle registration plate (until 2022): SK
- Website: www.matovce.sk

Matovce (Hungarian: Mátévágása) is a village and municipality in Svidník District in the Prešov Region of north-eastern Slovakia.

== History ==
In historical records the village was first mentioned in 1423.

== Geography ==
The municipality lies at an altitude of 196 metres (643 ft) and covers an area of 4.01 km^{2} (1.55 sq mi) (2025).

== Population ==
Population statistic (10 years)
Year	1995	2005	2015	2025
Count	146	132	125	124
Difference		−9.58%	−5.30%	−0.8%

Population statistic
Year	2024	2025
Count	119	124
Difference		+4.20%

It has a population of 124 people (31 December 2025).

=== Ethnicity ===
Census 2021 (1+ %)
Ethnicity	Number	Fraction
Slovak	116	99.14%
Rusyn	26	22.22%
Total	117	

In year 2021 was 117 people by ethnicity 116 as Slovak and 26 as Rusyn.

Note on population: The difference values of population numbers in the table "Population statistic" and in the sections "Ethnicity" & "Religion" is caused by the use of various statistical methods.

=== Religion ===
Census 2021 (1+ %)
Religion	Number	Fraction
Greek Catholic Church	92	78.63%
Roman Catholic Church	17	14.53%
Eastern Orthodox Church	6	5.13%
Total	117	

In year 2021 was 117 people by religion 92 from Greek Catholic Church, 17 from Roman Catholic Church, 6 from Eastern Orthodox Church, 1 from Christian Congregations in Slovakia and 1 from Evangelical Church.
