= Andrii Deshchytsia =

Ukrainian diplomat and politician

- Андрій Дещиця
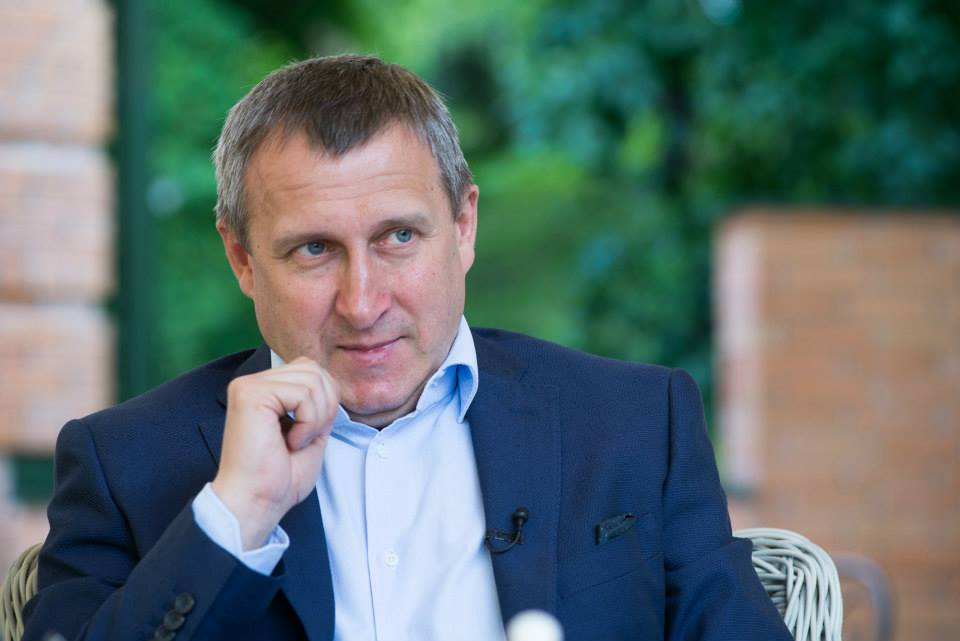

Ambassador of Ukraine to Poland
- In office 13 October 2014 – 10 June 2022
- President: Petro Poroshenko; Volodymyr Zelenskyy
- Preceded by: Vladyslav Kanevsky (temporary chargé d'affaires)
- Succeeded by: Vasyl Zvarych

Acting Minister of Foreign Affairs
- In office 27 February 2014 – 19 June 2014
- President: Oleksandr Turchynov (acting); Petro Poroshenko
- Prime Minister: Arseniy Yatsenyuk
- Preceded by: Leonid Kozhara
- Succeeded by: Pavlo Klimkin

Ambassador of Ukraine to Finland
- In office 2008–2012
- President: Viktor Yushchenko; Viktor Yanukovych
- Preceded by: Oleksandr Maidannyk
- Succeeded by: Oleksiy Selin

Personal details
- Born: Andrii Bohdanovych Deshchytsia; 22 September 1965 (age 61) Spasiv, Lviv Oblast, Ukrainian SSR
- Education: Lviv University; University of Alberta

Andrii Bohdanovych Deshchytsia (Ukrainian: Андрій Богданович Дещиця; born 22 September 1965) is a Ukrainian diplomat and politician.

From February to June 2014 Deshchytsia was Acting Foreign minister of Ukraine.

Deshchytsia was from October 2014 to June 2022 Ambassador Extraordinary and Plenipotentiary of Ukraine to Republic of Poland.

== Early life and education ==
Andrii Deshchytsia was born on 22 September 1965 in Spasiv, near Pervyatychi, Lviv Oblast. His father, Bohdan Deshchytsia, worked as a postmaster in Sokal, and in the 1990s held the first rallies for Ukraine here. His mother worked as a paramedic and nurse.

In 1989, he graduated from Ivan Franko Lviv National University.

Then, in 1995, he graduated with a master's degree from the Department of History of the University of Alberta (Edmonton, Alberta, Canada).

Deshchytsia became a Candidate of Political Science after the successful defense of his master's thesis "The Rise of Multi-Party Systems in Poland and Ukraine", written under the supervision of Professor John-Paul Himka.

He is fluent in Ukrainian, English, Russian, and Polish.

== Professional career ==
=== Early positions ===
From 1996 to 1999, Andrii Deshchytsia served as press Secretary, First Secretary of the Embassy of Ukraine to the Republic of Poland.

In 1999–2001, he was a Senior Coordinator of PAUCI (Polish-American-Ukrainian Cooperation Initiative).

From 2001 to 2004, he took a position of a counselor of the Embassy of Ukraine to the Republic of Finland and then as Counselor and Minister-Counselor of the Embassy of Ukraine to the Republic of Poland until 2006.

In 2006–2007, Deshchytsia was Spokesperson of the Ministry of Foreign Affairs of Ukraine.

From 2008 to 2012, he served as Ambassador Extraordinary and Plenipotentiary of Ukraine to the Republic of Finland and Iceland, while living in Finland.

From 2012 to February 2014, Andrii Deshchytsia was Ambassador-at-Large. During that time, from January–December 2013, he was Special Representative of OSCE Chairperson-in-Office for Conflict Resolution.

=== As Ukrainian Foreign Minister ===
On 27 February 2014 he was appointed Acting Minister of Foreign Affairs of Ukraine.

==== UN Resolution on Territorial integrity of Ukraine ====
On 27 March 2014, at the UN General Assembly, Deshchytsia presented the resolution on "Territorial integrity of Ukraine", which was supported by 100 United Nations member states, affirming the United Nations commitment to recognize Crimea within Ukraine's international borders and to condemn Crimea's annexation by Russia as illegal.

==== Geneva Statement on Ukraine ====
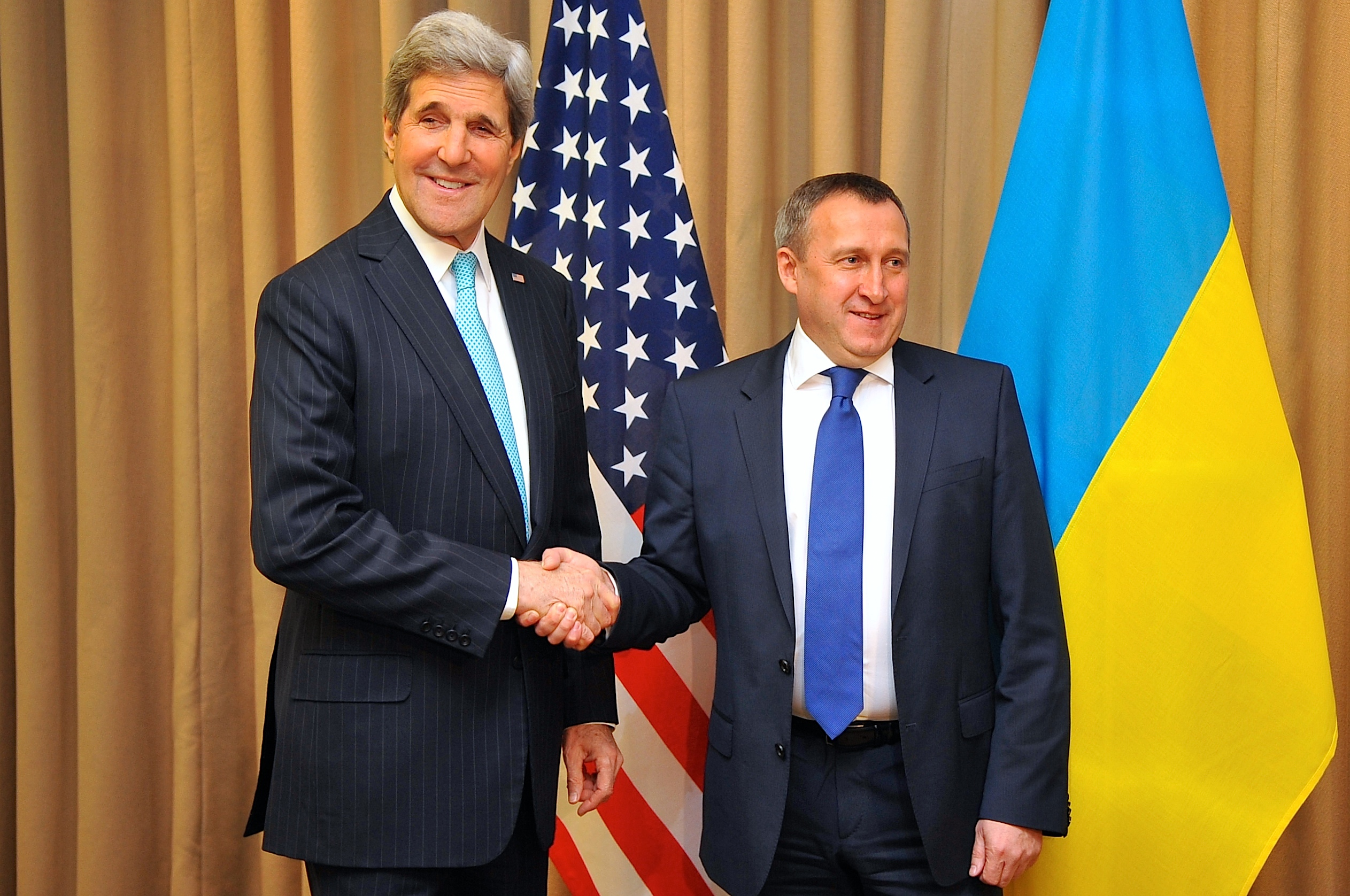
U.S. Secretary of State John Kerry with Deshchytsia in Geneva, Switzerland, on 17 April 2014

On 17 April 2014, Deshchytsia negotiated with John Kerry, Catherine Ashton, and Sergei Lavrov at a quadrilateral meeting in Geneva in an attempt to find a diplomatic solution to the war and humanitarian crisis caused by the Russian aggression in Ukraine. The resulting Geneva Statement on Ukraine laid the ground for de-escalating the crisis. However, Russia has repeatedly breached its commitments under the Geneva agreement, according to official statements of the leaders of the EU and the United States. One week after the joint Geneva Statement, U.S. Secretary of State John Kerry accused Russia of failing to adhere to Geneva commitments by orchestrating armed resistance in eastern Ukraine. U.S. President Barack Obama stated that Vladimir Putin has 'not lifted a finger to ease tensions. President of the European Council Herman Van Rompuy acknowledged that Russia has not lived up to its Geneva commitments.

==== Advocating sanctions against Russia ====
In May 2014, Deshchytsia said: "The West should impose more severe sanctions that hit specific economic sectors such as banking and target Russian decision-makers. Deshchytsia labeled pro-Russian separatists as "terrorists".

==== Progress in visa-free regime with EU for Ukrainian citizens ====
Deshchytsia also said "We expect that the decision (to switch to the 2nd phase of the introduction of a visa-free regime with Ukraine) will be taken at the EU Council's meeting on June 23".

==== Incident near the Russian Embassy ====
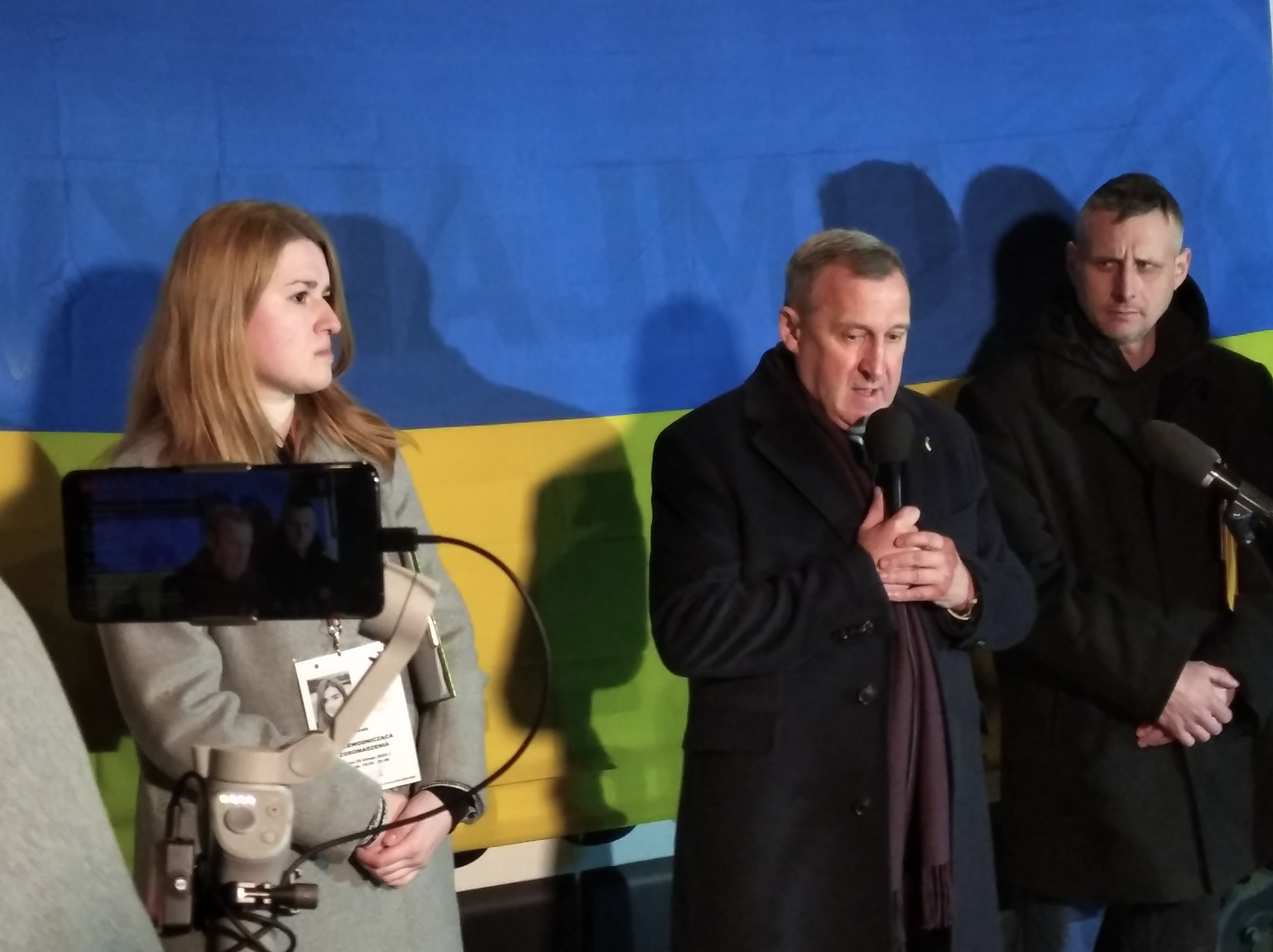
Andrii Deshchytsia (2022)

On 14 June 2014 protesters had swarmed on the Russian embassy, overturning the embassy car and throwing paint and egg missiles, after pro-Russian combatants shot down a Ukrainian plane killing 49 on board. Deshchytsia had descended on the protest in the hope that he could quell the escalating trouble, pleading with the demonstrators not to attack the building despite also understanding their concerns. "Did I say that I am against you protesting? I am for you protesting. I am ready to be here with you and say 'Russia, get out of Ukraine'," he told the baying crowd. "Yes, Putin is a khuilo!, yes," he said. However, Geoffrey Pyatt, the US ambassador to Ukraine, wrote on Twitter that the minister had been "seeking to defuse a dangerous situation", adding that Deshchytsia is "a skilled diplomat and credit to Ukraine". On 19 June 2014, with the recent Presidential change, Deschytsia was replaced with Pavlo Klimkin, the former Ukrainian ambassador to Germany.

==== Ambassador of Ukraine to Poland ====
On 13 October 2014, President Petro Poroshenko appointed Deshchytsia Ambassador of Ukraine to Poland.

President Volodymyr Zelenskyy dismissed Deshchytsia as Ukraine's ambassador to Poland on 8 February 2022.

== Diplomatic rank ==
- Ambassador Extraordinary and Plenipotentiary of Ukraine.

== See also ==
- Ministry of Foreign Affairs (Ukraine)
- Embassy of Ukraine, Helsinki
