= Yuri Doroshenko =

Russian-Ukrainian footballer

Personal information
- Full name: Yuri Vladimirovich Doroshenko
- Date of birth: 30 August 1980 (age 46)
- Height: 1.98 m (6 ft 6 in)
- Position: Forward

Youth career
- FC Dynamo Kyiv

Senior career*
Years	Team	Apps	(Gls)
1997–1999	FC Dynamo-2 Kyiv	3	(0)
1997–1998	→ FC Dynamo-3 Kyiv	25	(4)
1999	FC Yavir Sumy	1	(0)
2000	FC Obolon-PPO Kyiv	6	(0)
2000	→ FC Obolon-2 Kyiv	3	(0)
2001	FC Arsenal Tula	14	(1)
2001	FC Metallurg Lipetsk	9	(1)
2002	FC Don Novomoskovsk	32	(17)
2003	FC Arsenal Tula	14	(1)
2003	FC Don Novomoskovsk	17	(3)
2004–2005	FC KAMAZ Naberezhnye Chelny	14	(1)
2006	FC Oryol	16	(2)
2006	FC Spartak-MZhK Ryazan	7	(5)
2007	FC Volga Nizhny Novgorod	18	(2)
2008	FC Nizhny Novgorod	8	(0)
2008	FC Lukhovitsy	17	(3)
2009	FC Gubkin	3	(0)
- * Club domestic league appearances and goals

Yuri Vladimirovich Doroshenko (Russian: Юрий Владимирович Дорошенко; born 30 August 1980) is a former Russian professional football player. He also holds Ukrainian citizenship as Yuriy Volodymyrovych Doroshenko (Ukrainian: Юрій Володимирович Дорошенко).

== Club career ==
He played 3 seasons in the Russian Football National League for FC Arsenal Tula, FC KAMAZ Naberezhnye Chelny and FC Oryol.

== See also ==
- Football in Russia
- List of football clubs in Russia
