= General Chereshnya =

- Type: Limited Liability Company
- Industry: Defense industry
- Founded: 2023; 3 years ago
- Headquarters: Ukraine
- Website: gencherry.com

General Chereshnya is a Ukrainian defense technology company specializing in the development and mass production of First-Person View (FPV) strike drones, fiber-optic guided unmanned aerial vehicles (UAVs), aerial interceptor platforms, and fixed-wing loitering munitions. The company is one of the largest hardware suppliers to the Ukrainian Defense Forces, maintaining a peak production output of approximately 100,000 drones per month.

== History ==
The company draws its name from Hnyla Chereshnia (Ukrainian: Гнила черешня, lit. 'Rotten Cherry'), a prominent online community based in Melitopol. Following the 2022 full-scale Russian invasion, the channel served as a primary coordination hub for the Ukrainian partisan movement and intelligence operations within the occupied territories of the Zaporizhzhia region. The channel's administrators operated under the military-themed pseudonyms "General Chereshnya" (General Cherry) and "Soldier Tsybulia" (Soldier Onion).

In 2022, the initiative operated strictly as a volunteer organization, crowdfunding and procuring ammunition and logistics vehicles for Ukrainian military units. In September 2023, the organization transitioned into a commercial defense-technology enterprise focused on drone manufacturing, deploying its first experimental test batch to the front lines in late 2023.

Because UAV manufacturing infrastructure represents a high-priority target for Russian intelligence services, the company relocated its main assembly lines away from the city of Zaporizhia. This move followed a June 10, 2024, assassination attempt against the company’s director of strategic communications, Rudolf Hakobyan, which was orchestrated by a Russian Federal Security Service (FSB) sabotage group in central Zaporizhia. Ukrainian special services successfully thwarted the plot. Following the incident, General Chereshnya established a highly decentralized production network comprising approximately one dozen manufacturing facilities across various regions of Ukraine.

== International cooperation ==
As of 2025–2026, the company’s baseline manufacturing output stands at 50,000 to 70,000 drones per month. The domestic localization rate for manufacturing is 35–40%, with sub-assemblies such as frames, control systems, and stabilization shanks produced directly within Ukraine. Other essential components are primarily imported from China due to supply chain capacity limits among domestic contractors, who are unable to meet required component volumes (e.g., providing 55,000 video antennas monthly).

To mitigate reliance on Chinese supply chains, General Chereshnya has entered into several strategic international partnerships:

- ORQA (Croatia): On April 7, 2026, the company signed a memorandum of understanding in Osijek, Croatia, to jointly establish an underground electronics manufacturing facility in Ukraine. The factory is designed to produce flight stacks, communications infrastructure, and other electronic components completely independent of Chinese parts. ORQA is Europe's largest manufacturer of UAV electronics and components, supplying over 50 countries and 24 NATO member states.
- Wilcox Industries (United States): In March 2026, General Chereshnya signed an agreement with the American corporation Wilcox Industries to form a joint venture based in Newington, New Hampshire. The facility aims to manufacture FPV drones and interceptor platforms tailored for the U.S. Department of Defense and the broader American commercial market, with all products built to conform to Blue UAS certification standards.

In February 2026, General Chereshnya was selected by the U.S. Department of Defense to participate in the $1.1 billion Drone Dominance Program. The company presented an integrated system solution featuring a proprietary drone platform, a dedicated control system, and an integrated payload warhead. Field testing was conducted at the Fort Benning military base.

== Products ==
The company manufactures over 30 separate products officially codified by the Ministry of Defense of Ukraine. Its portfolio spans standard FPV kamikaze drones, anti-aircraft interceptor platforms, fiber-optic guided models, and fixed-wing strike UAVs.

=== Standard FPV drones ===
The company's primary strike quadcopter line utilizes frames scaled from 7 to 15 inches (encompassing General Chereshnya models 7, 8, 9, 10, 13, and 15). These platforms are equipped with high-output electric motors alongside daylight, low-light night, or thermal imaging cameras featuring sensor resolutions of 256, 384, 480, or 640 pixels.

- Flight range: 16 km (7-inch) to 32 km (15-inch).
- Payload: 1.5 kg to 8 kg.
- Flight endurance: 18 to 40 minutes

=== Interceptor drones ===
General Chereshnya’s anti-aircraft drone platforms are specifically optimized to intercept and destroy Russian reconnaissance and strike UAVs. They operate in tandem with a proprietary digital ground tracking station featuring a 360-degree rotating directional mechanism and a secure, encrypted digital communication channel.

- AIR / AIR Pro: Engineered to down fixed-wing reconnaissance aircraft such as the Orlan-10, ZALA, Supercam, and Merlin. It features a top speed of 170–200 km/h, an operational ceiling of 6,800 meters, and a tactical radius of 24 km.
- AIR Speed: A compact 8-inch high-velocity variant designed to counter highly maneuverable targets, reaching speeds of 236–240 km/h.
- Bullet: A specialized high-speed "anti-Shahed" interceptor with a cruising speed of 185 km/h and a maximum speed exceeding 309 km/h. It is capable of destroying Shahed-136 and Gerbera-class loitering munitions. The Bullet entered mass production in October 2025.

=== Fiber Optic Drones (OPTIX) ===
The General Chereshnya OPTIX series utilizes physical fiber-optic cable links for control and video transmission, rendering the platforms completely immune to electronic warfare (EW) jamming or spoofing. The series is built on 10-, 13-, and 15-inch frames and carries cable reels ranging from 15 to 35 kilometers in length. The optical fiber is pre-treated with a specialized fluid compound to prevent accidental tangling or spontaneous unwinding during high-speed deployment.

=== Fixed-Wing Strike UAVs ===
In April 2026, the company introduced the Khmarinka (English: Little Cloud), a fixed-wing kamikaze drone designed as a low-cost, mass-producible asset. Visually similar to the Russian Molniya UAV, the Khmarinka is catapult-launched, possesses an operational range of up to 50 km, carries a 7 kg payload, and operates at a cruise speed of 140 km/h.

== Combat use ==
General Chereshnya platforms are deployed by more than 110 active units across the Armed Forces of Ukraine, national security agencies, and specialized services—including the 3rd Special Forces Brigade, the 47th Special Forces Brigade, the SBU "Alpha" Special Operations Center, and the National Police "KORD" unit. According to statistics from the Delta situational awareness system, the company's hardware consistently ranks among the top five Ukrainian defense assets based on total confirmed successful strikes.

On September 29, 2025, personnel from the 59th Motorized Infantry Brigade used a company drone to down a Russian Mi-8 transport helicopter in mid-air. On March 20, 2026, the same unit’s specialized UAV detachment ("Predators of Heights") destroyed a Russian Ka-52 attack helicopter using a General Chereshnya OPTIX fiber-optic drone. The interception occurred over the village of Nadiivka in the Donetsk region; the drone struck the helicopter's S-8 unguided aerial rocket (NAR) pod, triggering a catastrophic fire. While the flight crew managed an emergency landing, they were subsequently eliminated by follow-up strike drones.

In February 2026, operators from the 118th Separate Mechanized Brigade became the first globally to down a rare Russian AI-guided "Klyn" kamikaze drone (valued at roughly $35,000, carrying a 5 kg warhead, and capable of speeds up to 300 km/h) using a General Chereshnya AIR interceptor in the Orikhiv direction of the Zaporizhia region. Concurrently, the 25th Separate Airborne Sicheslav Brigade of the Ukrainian Air Assault Forces (DShV) neutralized 43 Russian Mavic reconnaissance quadcopters within a three-day window using AIR series interceptors. Earlier, in July 2025, the company confirmed the first successful mid-air combat interceptions of Russian Gerbera drones (a low-cost alternative to the Shahed-136) using a modified AIR variant, representing the first recorded instance of a Gerbera being downed by a Ukrainian FPV interceptor platform.

Cumulatively, the company's anti-aircraft drone systems have accounted for the destruction of more than 2,000 Russian reconnaissance and strike UAVs. This total includes the downing of a rare Russian "Prince Oleg the Prophetic" deep-reconnaissance drone in December 2025. By March 2026, General Chereshnya platforms achieved the highest monthly interception rate along the front lines, recording over 11.4 thousand confirmed hits against enemy UAVs—primarily countering mass deployments of Russian Molniya drones, alongside documented intercepts of Gerbera decoy systems and Shahed strike platforms.

== Financials and Procurement ==
In 2024, the company's annual revenue reached UAH 657 million. During the first half of 2025, total contract volume expanded sharply to UAH 4.5 billion, lifting mid-year revenue to UAH 1.5 billion. Total projected year-end revenue for 2025 was estimated to reach UAH 7 billion.

In August 2025, General Chereshnya became the first defense manufacturer to successfully fulfill an operational hardware contract via Ukraine's newly implemented state-operated military procurement platform, DOT-Chain Defence. The end-to-end timeline from the requesting military unit's placement of the order to final field shipment was completed within eight days.

== Corporate Structure and Training ==
The company operates as a registered corporate resident within Ukraine's Diya.City special economic zone. As of 2026, the corporate workforce exceeds 600 employees, with military veterans comprising approximately 20% of the staff. In April 2026, the General Chereshnya brand was recognized among the "50 Best Employers in Ukraine" by Forbes Ukraine and robota.ua, securing the top spot in the "Dynamic Growth" category.

The enterprise also maintains the General Chereshnya Academy, which operates a mobile training system tasked with instruction for drone operators and technical maintenance personnel. In February 2026, the Academy formalized a partnership with the Dignitas Foundation under the "Anti-Shahed Frontier" initiative to scale up specialized training programs for military units deploying aerial interceptor systems.
