= Petro Sardachuk =

Ukrainian diplomat (1938–2022)

Ukrainian Ambassador to Iceland
- In office April 2002 – July 2003

Ukrainian Ambassador to Finland
- In office October 2001 – July 2003

Ukrainian Ambassador to Poland
- In office December 1994 – December 1998

Ukrainian Ambassador to Slovakia
- In office September 1993 – December 1994

Personal details
- Born: 11 July 1938 Zvozy, Wołyń Voivodeship, Poland
- Died: 21 January 2022 (aged 83)
- Education: University of Lviv
- Occupation: Diplomat

Petro Danylovych Sardachuk (Ukrainian: Петро Данилович Сардачук; 11 July 1938 – 21 January 2022) was a Ukrainian diplomat. He served as ambassador to Slovakia, Poland, Finland, and Iceland. He died on 21 January 2022, at the age of 83.

== Biography ==
Petro Danylovych Sardachuk was born on 11 July 1938 in the Ukrainian village of Zvozy, which at that time was part of the Volyn Voivodeship of the Polish Republic (now the Kivertsi urban community of Lutsk district, Volyn region). In 1960, he graduated from the History Department of Lviv State University. After graduating from the university, he worked as a high school teacher and school principal from 1960 to 1962.

From 1962 to 1975, Sardachuk worked in the Komsomol and party work in Kyiv, Lviv, and Ivano-Frankivsk. In 1970, he defended his dissertation and received a PhD in history, despite the fact that historiography in the USSR was an element of state propaganda. From 27 December 1975 to 1984 he was the secretary of the Ivano-Frankivsk Regional Committee of the Communist Party of Ukraine.

In 1984, Petro Sardachuk began his diplomatic work at the Ministry of Foreign Affairs of the USSR. During 1984-1985, he worked as an advisor to the Department of Socialist European Countries of the USSR Ministry of Foreign Affairs. In 1986, Petro Sardachuk graduated from the Diplomatic Academy of the USSR Ministry of Foreign Affairs. Upon graduation in 1986, Mr. Sardachuk was appointed Consul General of the USSR in Krakow, where he worked until 1991. Just before the collapse of the USSR, in 1991, he worked as the head of the Third European Department of the USSR Ministry of Foreign Affairs.

After the declaration of Ukraine's independence, he joined the Ministry of Foreign Affairs of Ukraine as Head of the Consular Section in 1991-1993. Later he held the post of Ambassador Extraordinary and Plenipotentiary:
