= Embassy of Ukraine, Warsaw =

Diplomatic mission

Embassy of Ukraine in Warsaw
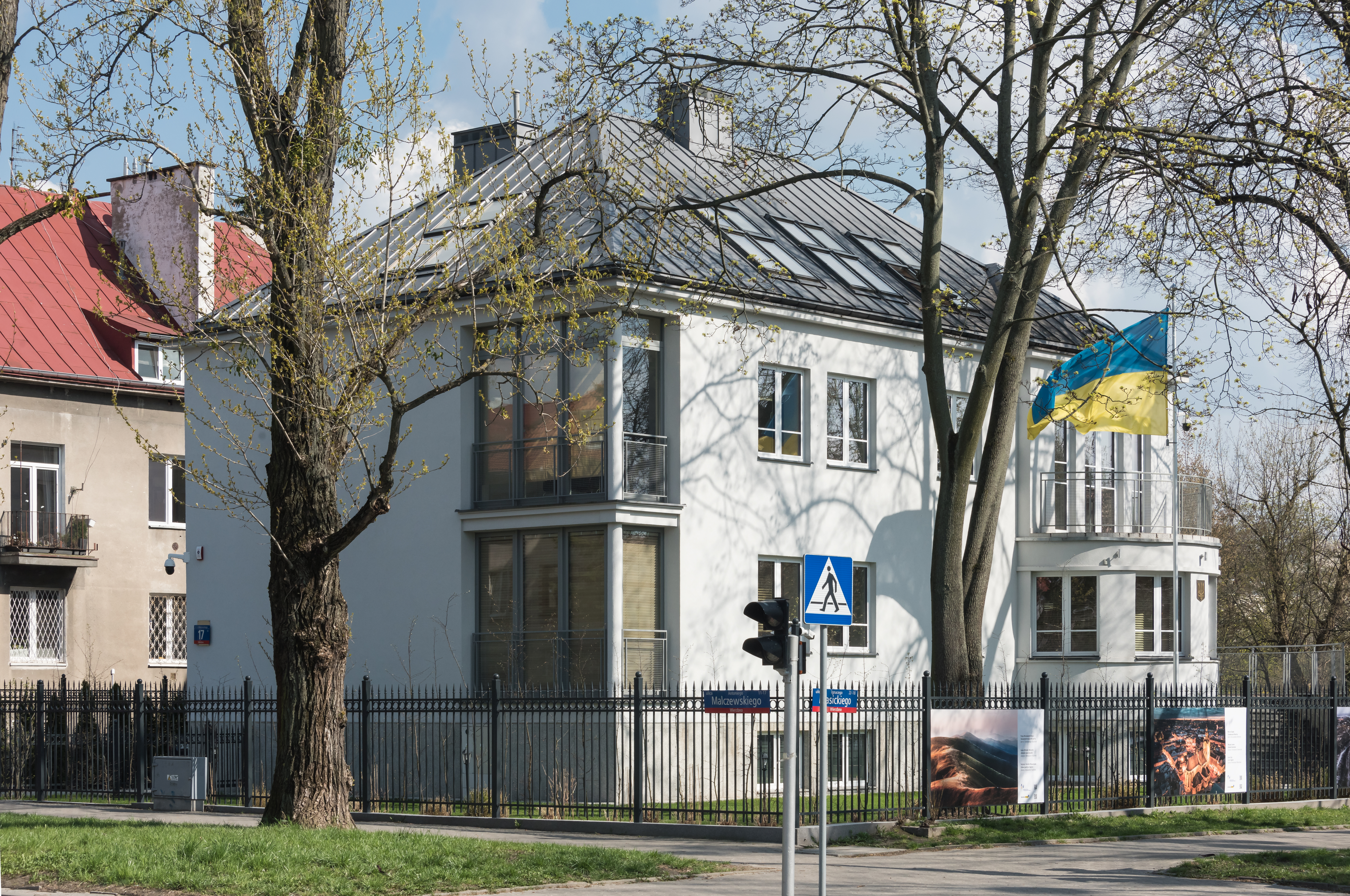
- Location: Warsaw, Poland
- Address: ul. A.Malczewskiego 17
- Coordinates: 52°12′54″N 21°01′19″E
- Ambassador: Vasyl Bodnar (since 2024)

The Embassy of Ukraine in Warsaw is the diplomatic mission of Ukraine in Poland.

== History ==
Poland recognised the independence of Ukraine on 2 December 1991. Diplomatic relations were established on 4 January 1992. After the establishment of an independent Ukraine in 1991, the opened an office in Poland, sending a diplomat with the rank of "Special Envoy of the government," starting diplomatic relations. In 1992 it was raised to the rank of an embassy. Currently it is located on ul. A.Malczewskiego 17, Warsaw.

== Ambassadors ==
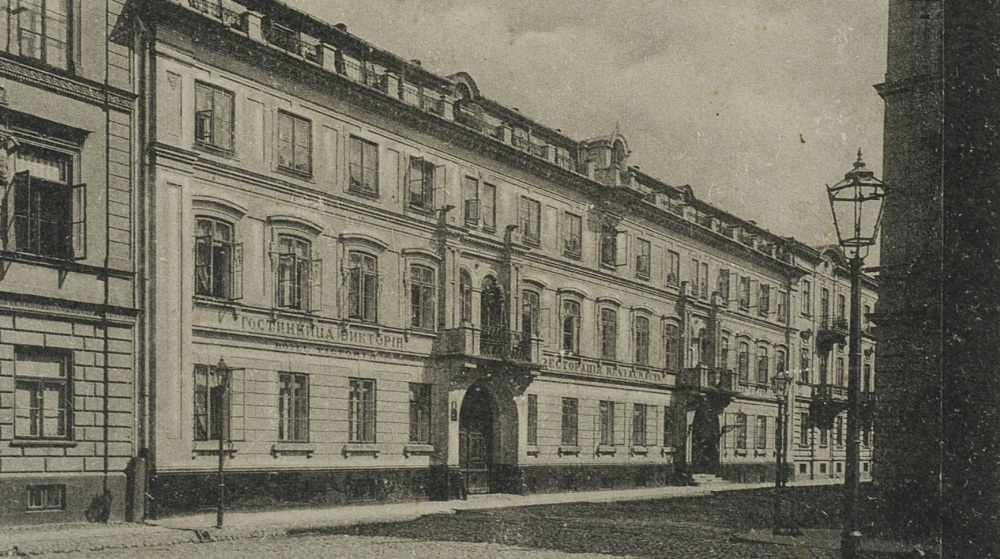
Embassy of Ukraine, Warsaw (1920)

1. Olexander Karpynskyy (1918)
2. Andriy Livytskyi (1919–1920)
3. Isai Hurhin (1920)
4. Mieczyslaw Loganovsky (1921)
5. Alexander Shumsky (1921–1922)
6. Gregory Besyedovskyy (1922–1923)
7. Teodozij Starak (1991)
8. Anatoly Shevchuk (1991–1992)
9. Hennadiy Udovenko (1992–1994)
10. Peter Sardachuk (1994–1998)
11. Dmytro Pavlychko (1999–2002)
12. Olexander Nikonenko (2002–2003)
13. Ihor Kharchenko (2003–2005)
14. Olexander Motsyk (2005–2010)
15. Markiyan Malsky (2010–2014)
16. Vladyslav Kanevsky (2014), сharge d'Affaires
17. Andrii Deshchytsia (2014–2022)
18. Vasyl Zvarych (2022–2024)
19. Vasyl Bodnar (since 2024)

== See also ==
- Poland-Ukraine relations
- Foreign relations of Poland
- Foreign relations of Ukraine
- Embassy of Poland in Kyiv
- Diplomatic missions of Ukraine
