= Embassy of Poland, Kyiv =

Embassy of Poland in Kyiv
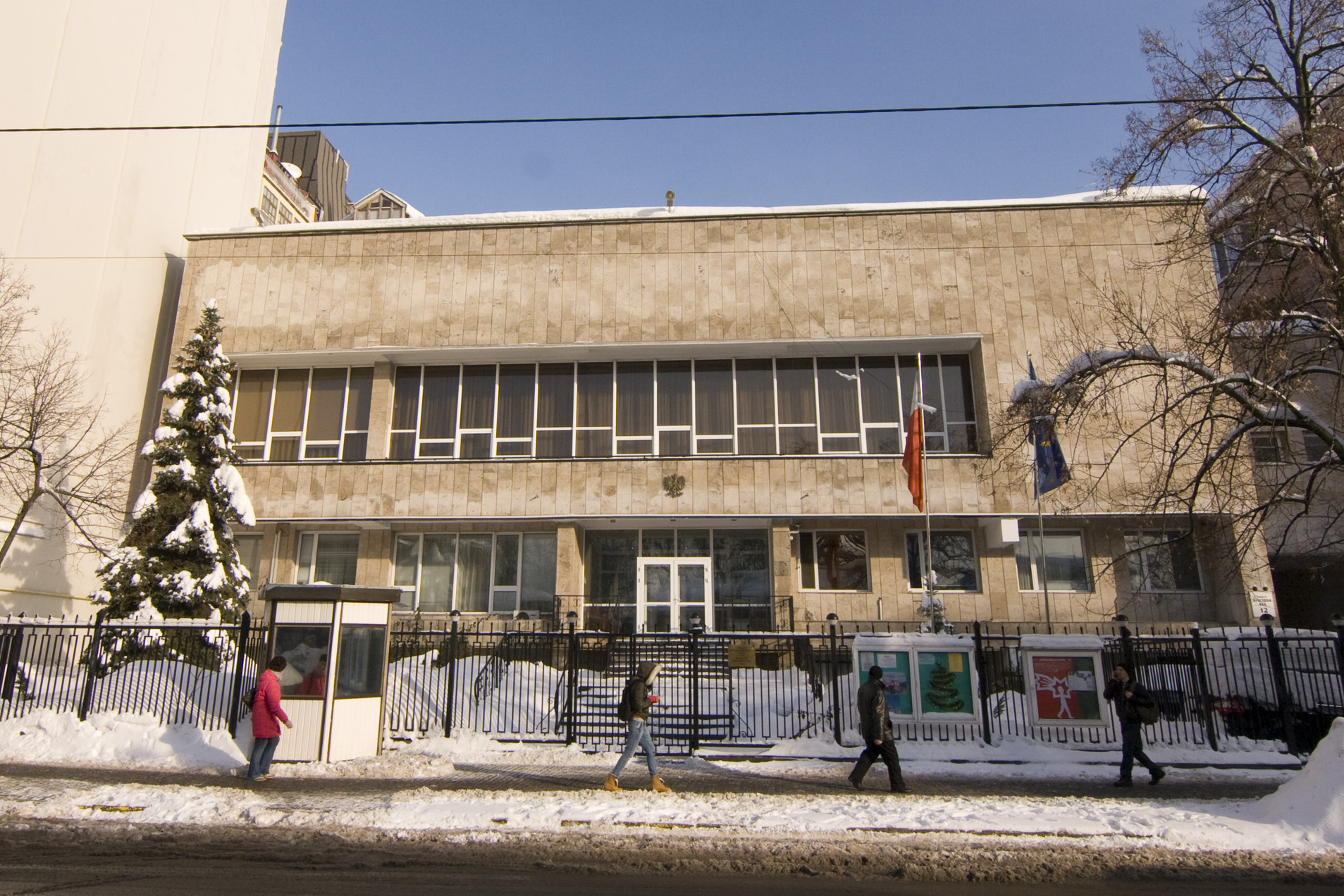
- Location: Kyiv
- Address: Yaroslaviv Val St., 12, Kyiv 01034, Ukraine
- Coordinates: 50°27′00″N 30°30′43″E
- Ambassador: Piotr Łukasiewicz (Chargé d'affaires)

The Embassy of Poland in Kyiv (Polish: Ambasada Rzeczypospolitej Polskiej w Kijowie, Ukrainian: Посольство Республіки Польща в Києві) is the diplomatic mission of the Republic of Poland in Ukraine.

== History ==
Following the Declaration of Independence of Ukraine on 24 August 1991, Poland recognized Ukraine on 2 December 1991. Diplomatic relations between the two countries was established on 4 January 1992.

== List of ambassadors ==
- Stanislaw Wankowicz (1918)
- Bogdan Kutyłowski (1919–1921)
- John Francis Pulaski (1921)
- Francis Charwat (1921–1923)
- Marcel Szarota (1923–1924)
- Jerzy Kozakiewicz (1992–1997)
- Jerzy Bahr (1997–2001)
- Marek Ziółkowski (2001–2005)
- Jacek Kluczkowski (2005–2010)
- Henryk Litwin (2011–2016)
- Jan Piekło (2016–2019)
- Bartosz Cichocki (2019–2023)
- Jarosław Guzy (2023–2024)
- Piotr Łukasiewicz, Chargé d'affaires (since 2024)

== See also ==
- Poland-Ukraine relations
- Foreign relations of Poland
- Foreign relations of Ukraine
- Embassy of Ukraine, Warsaw
- Diplomatic missions in Ukraine
- Diplomatic missions of Poland
