= Romaszewski =

Romaszewski, feminine: Romaszewska is a Polish surname. Russian version: Romashevsky, Belarusian: Ramašeŭski. Notable people with the surname include:

- Agnieszka Romaszewska-Guzy
- Zbigniew Romaszewski
- Zofia Romaszewska
