= Kristina Berdynskykh =

Ukrainian political journalist (born 1983)

- Born: 1983 (age 42–43); Kherson, Kherson Oblast, Ukraine
- Education: Petro Mohyla Black Sea State University; University of Warsaw
- Occupation: Political journalist

Kristina Volodymyrivna Berdynskykh (Ukrainian: Крістіна Володимирівна Бердинських; born 1983) is a Ukrainian political journalist.

== Biography ==
Berdynskykh is from the southern Ukrainian city of Kherson. She studied at the Petro Mohyla Black Sea State University in Ukraine, then at the University of Warsaw in Poland.

Berdynskykh is based in Kyiv, where she worked as a political journalist at the independent news magazine Novoye Vremya. She has also worked as a journalist at Korrespondent magazine (2008 to 2013) and on television projects on Hromadske TV, 3s.tv and Channel 24.

In 2016, Berdynskykh won the Belarus in Focus competition. In 2017, whilst accredited as a foreign journalist, Berdynskykh was briefly detained in the Belarusian capital city Minsk. In 2018, Berdynskykh was subject to a court ruling on access to her phone data, which she appealed. She has received multiple death threats for her journalism work.

After the outbreak of the Russo-Ukraine War in February 2022, Berdynskykh remained in Ukraine with her mother and has continued her work as a journalist reporting from areas under Russian bombardment. She has interviewed civilians, including children, and diplomats, such as the Ambassador of Poland to Ukraine, Bartosz Cichocki. She has been active on Twitter and launched the project "There are people." In 2024, Berdynskykh was writing in a café when a training grenade detonated. In 2025, Berdynskykh criticised the Russian flag being flown at the Venice Film Festival For Kyiv in Italy, which she called a "paradox."

Berdynskykh was named a BBC 100 Woman in 2022.
