= Poland and the Russo-Ukrainian war =

Involvement of Poland in the Russo-Ukrainian war

Prime Minister Donald Tusk with Ukraine President Volodymyr Zelenskyy, May 2026

Poland has supported Ukraine during the ongoing Russian invasion of Ukraine, during both Conservative and Civic governments. After it began on 24 February 2022, then Conservative Prime Minister Mateusz Morawiecki condemned the invasion, provided military and humanitarian aid to Ukraine, and sanctioned Russia and Belarus, the two countries most involved in invading Ukraine. Support to Ukraine has continued under incumbent Civic Prime Minister Donald Tusk.

== History ==
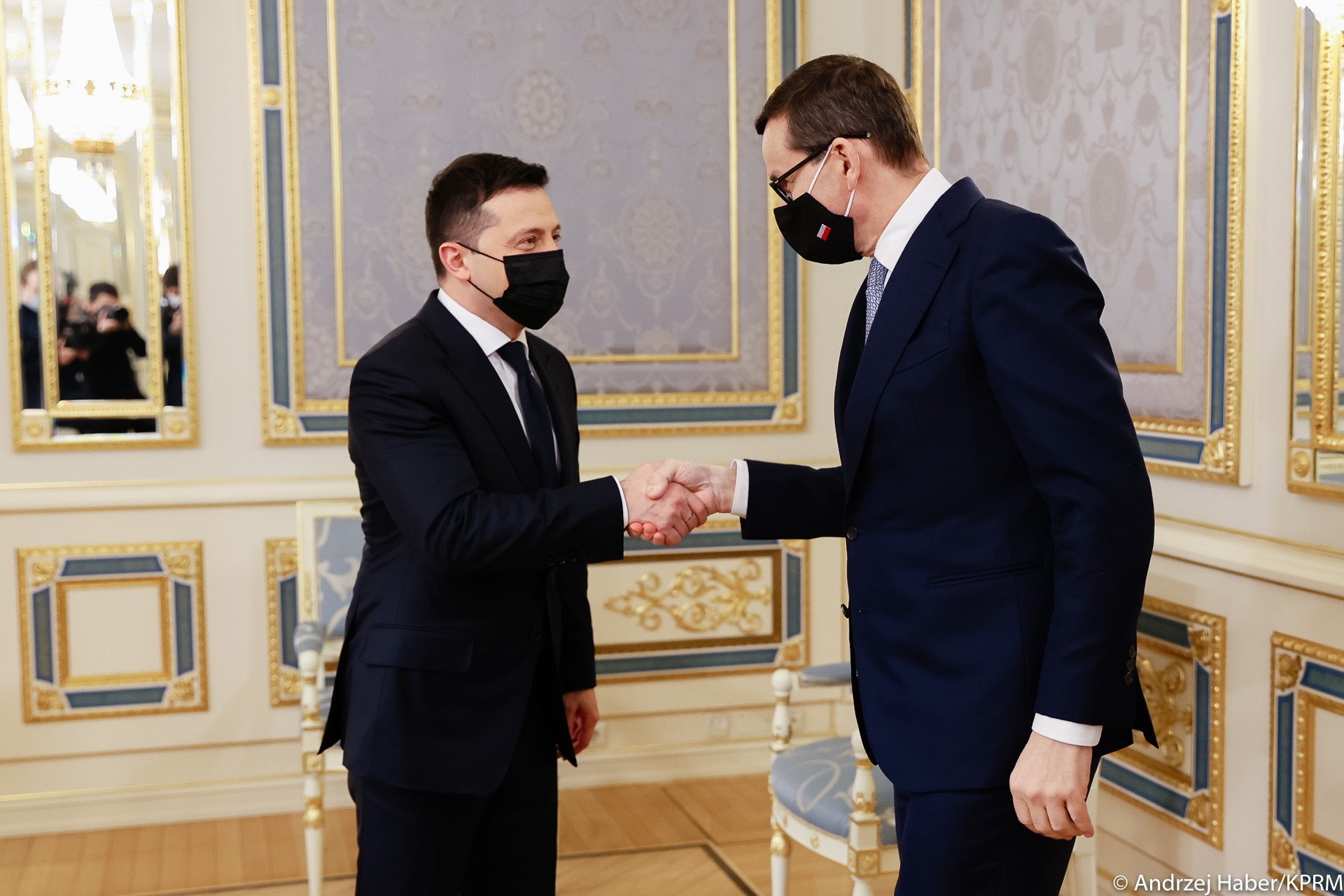
Zelenskyy with Polish Prime Minister Mateusz Morawiecki during the former's visit to Ukraine twenty three days before the invasion, 1 February 2022

In the lead-up to the Russian invasion of Ukraine, Polish prime minister Mateusz Morawiecki warned that Russian president Vladimir Putin sought to rebuild the Russian Empire and urged Europe to unite and prevent Putin from making his dreams reality.

On 21 January 2022, Polish President Andrzej Duda announced that Ukraine can count on Polish support if Russia attacks, and called for a unified stance in Europe. As of 24 January, Pawel Soloch, the head of Poland's National Security Bureau stated there was no talk of Polish troops entering Ukraine as the Ukrainian government had not requested it, but that "what matters most is military and humanitarian aid" and "building a uniform message". On the 21st, Soloch stated that "supporting Ukraine is one of the key priorities of President Andrzej Duda's policy", while Duda and Zelenskyy discussed the possibility of further Polish and NATO defensive equipment deliveries. In response to the Russian military buildup near Ukraine, on 31 January 2022, Poland announced the decision to supply Ukraine with weapons, ammunition, as well as humanitarian aid, given the threat of a Russian invasion of Ukraine.

On February 1, the United Kingdom, Poland, and Ukraine began talks to form a "trilateral pact" to counter potential threats from Russia to tighten cooperation "on various fields". Polish Prime Minister Mateusz Morawiecki pledged help from Warsaw for Ukraine in terms of both gas, humanitarian and economic aid, and arms, including artillery ammunation, mortars, portable air-defense systems, and surveillance drones, saying that "living close to a neighbour like Russia we have the feeling of living at the foot of a volcano". He also called on Germany not to start the Nord Stream 2 pipeline because "through launching this pipeline, Berlin is loading Putin's pistol, which he can then use to blackmail the whole of Europe", and that it was important not just for Ukraine but for all of Europe and NATO to stand up to Russia.

On February 3, it was announced that Polish President Andrzej Duda, the only elected EU head of state attending the Beijing Winter Olympics ceremony, would use the visit to present the "European case" to Beijing regarding its view on the conflict. On 17 February 2022, the British–Polish–Ukrainian trilateral pact was announced.

On 22 February, after Putin recognized the independence of the Donetsk and Luhansk regions of Ukraine, Prime Minister Morawiecki called the action "an act of aggression against Ukraine," and Polish leaders urged European powers to adopt strong financial sanctions against Russia. Morawiecki singled out Germany's Nord Stream 2 gas pipeline from Russia as "harmful and dangerous."

On 23 February 2022, in response to Russia's escalation of tensions and recognition of the separatist Donetsk People's Republic and Luhansk People's Republic in Russian-occupied eastern Ukraine, Polish President Andrzej Duda visited Kyiv along with the President of Lithuania, and they jointly declared solidarity and support for Ukraine and called for international sanctions against Russia.

On 24 February 2022, the day of the Russian invasion of Ukraine, the Sejm (Polish parliament) adopted by acclamation a resolution condemning the Russian invasion. Poland immediately set up nine reception points to receive civilian refugees from Ukraine. During the war in 2022, Poland became Ukraine's second-largest weapons supplier, with the weapons' total value exceeding $1.6 billion (as of 24 May 2022). Provided weapons include missiles, grenade launchers, rifles, drones, tanks, RPGs, and ammunition. Continued Polish support for Ukraine in early 2022 has led to significant improvement in Polish-Ukraine relations.

After the 2022 Russian invasion of Ukraine started, Poland, as one of the EU countries, imposed sanctions on Russia, and Russia added all EU countries to the list of "unfriendly countries". Morawiecki tweeted, "We must immediately respond to Russia's criminal aggression on Ukraine Europe and the free world has to stop Putin."

On February 26, the president of the Polish Football Association (PZPN) Cezary Kulesza announced that Poland will not play their World Cup qualifier match against Russia on March 24. On February 27, in a statement published on its website, PZPN has demanded Russia's exclusion from this year's World Cup in Qatar.

On 15 March 2022, Polish Prime Minister Mateusz Morawiecki travelled by train to Kyiv alongside Polish Deputy Prime Minister Jarosław Kaczyński, Czech Prime Minister Petr Fiala, and Slovenian Prime Minister Janez Janša. This was the first visit to Ukraine by foreign leaders since the beginning of Russia's full-scale invasion on 24 February 2022. Morawiecki expressed Poland's support for Ukraine, stating that "It is here that freedom fights against the world of tyranny; it is here that the future of us all hangs in the balance," while Zelenskiy described the visit as a big and brave step, emphasizing that "At a time when many countries have ordered their embassies closed or greatly reduced their diplomatic presence, these leaders of independent European states show that they had no fear."

On 9 May, during VE Day, Russian Ambassador to Poland Sergey Andreev was splashed with red liquid by Ukrainian protestors of the invasion, as he arrived at a Soviet military cemetery in Warsaw for wreath-laying ceremony. The protestors prevented the Russian delegation from laying the wreath and shouted "murderers" and "fascists" at them, before the police escorted Andreev and his delegation away from the Soviet military cemetery. Russian Foreign Ministry spokeswoman Maria Zakharova denounced the attack and called the protestors "young neo-Nazis", and demanded Poland to organize without delay the wreath-laying ceremony while providing complete security. Polish Minister of Interior and Administration Mariusz Kaminski defended the protestors saying that their gathering was legal and claimed that the protestors' actions were understandable due to emotions of Ukrainian women present in the protests "whose husbands are fighting bravely in defense of their homeland".

A survey from June 22 noted that only 2% of Poles hold a favourable view of Russia, while 97% have an unfavourable opinion, which was the most negative views of Russia among all countries included in that international survey. The 2% view was a stark decrease from previous polls, which for the past two decades had about 20–40% of Poles expressing a favourable view of Russia.

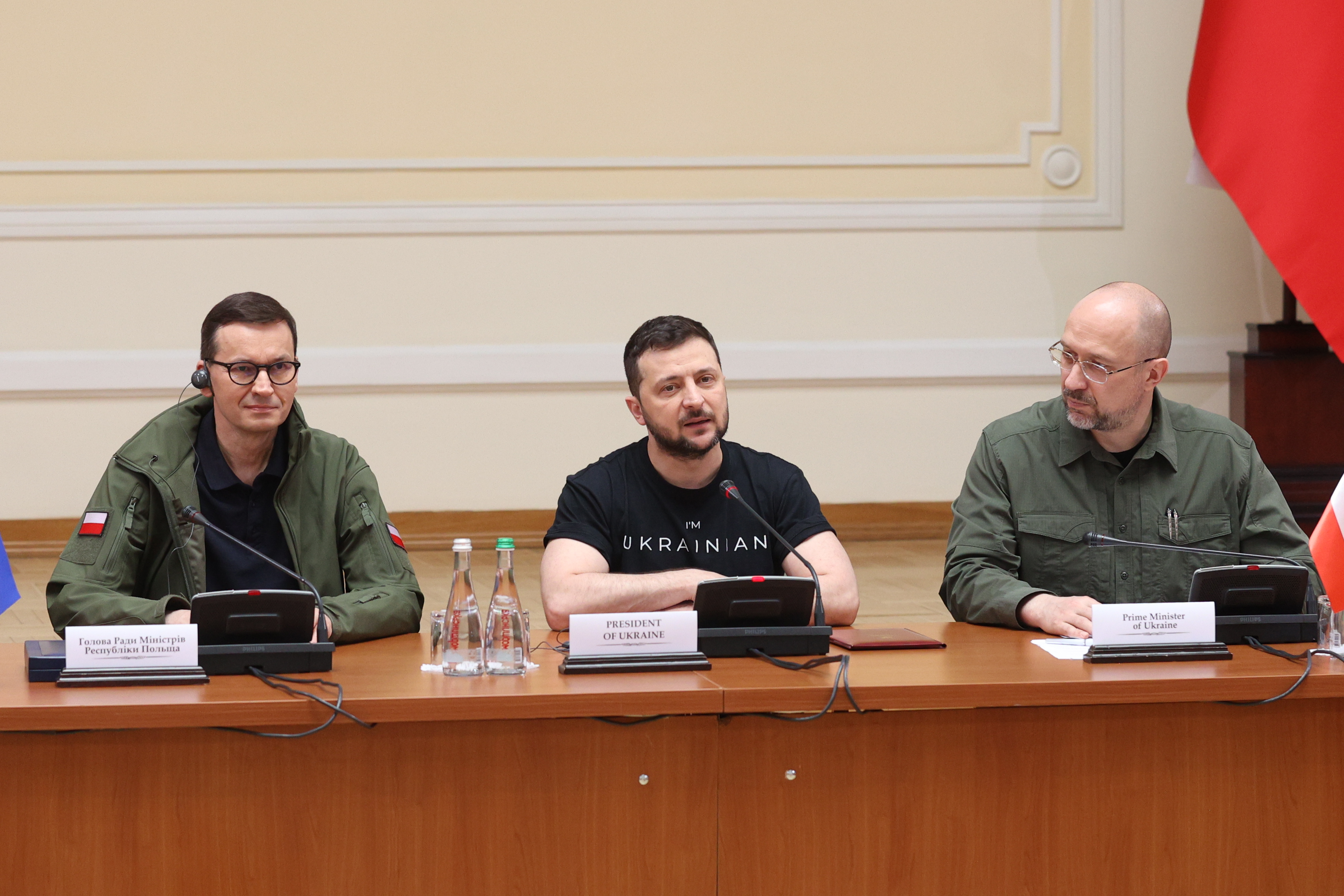
Polish Prime Minister Morawiecki, Ukrainian President Volodymyr Zelenskyy and Ukrainian Prime Minister Denys Shmyhal during intergovernmental consultations in Kyiv, 2022

On 1 June 2022, the first bilateral intergovernmental consultations took place in Kyiv.

In September 2022, Poland, Lithuania, Latvia, and Estonia decided to close entry for Russian citizens with Schengen visas, including those issued by third countries.

In October 2022, the Senate of Poland unanimously declared Russia as a terrorist state.

On November 2, 2022, Poland's Minister of National Defence Mariusz Błaszczak announced the construction of a barrier along the border with the Russian exclave of Kaliningrad, as Russia uses the border to illegally transport African and Asian immigrants to Europe.

Russia had failed to pay rent on a building in Warsaw and failed to vacate a building, despite a 2016 court order. After Poland took possession of these buildings, Russia announced it would close the Polish consulate in Smolensk in July 2023.

On 20 September 2023, Polish Prime Minister Mateusz Morawiecki announced that Poland would not supply weapons to Ukraine other than those previously agreed, amid tensions between the two countries over the Polish import ban on Ukrainian grain after cheap Ukrainian grain, which was meant to be exported through Poland, ended up being sold in Polish markets. After Ukrainian President Volodymyr Zelenskyy criticised Poland in his speech in the United Nations’ General Assembly, saying "some of our friends in Europe" were making "political theater" out of grain, Morawiecki warned President Zelenskyy to never “insult Poles again."

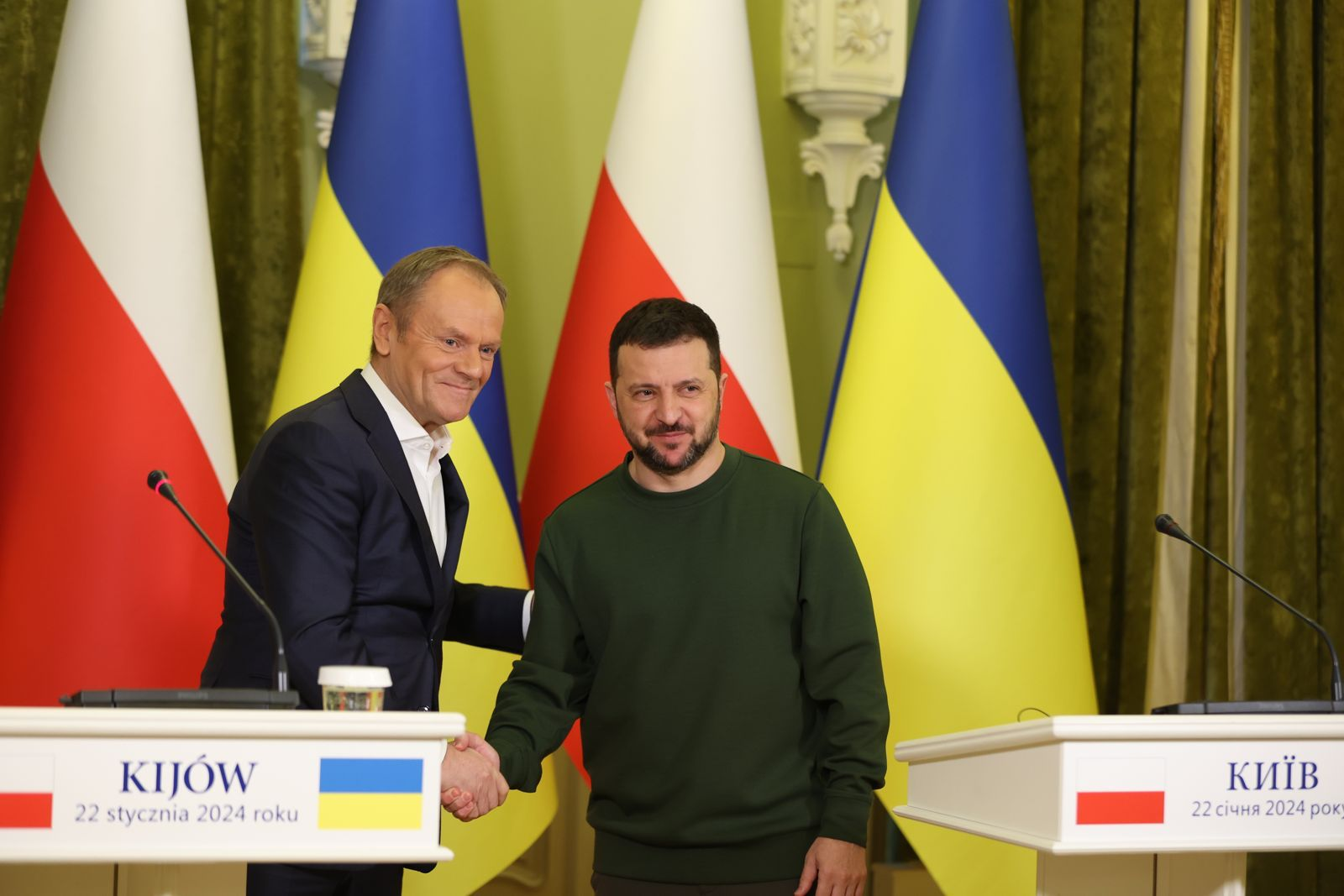
Polish Prime Minister Donald Tusk with Ukrainian President Volodymyr Zelenskyy in Kyiv, 22 January 2024

On 6 November 2023, several dozen owners of Polish transport companies blocked three major Poland–Ukraine border crossings to protest claimed unfair competition from Ukrainian transport companies. A temporary wartime EU agreement allowed Ukrainian trucks to deliver and collect to and from the EU without the usual permits. On 19 November, about 3,000 mostly Ukrainian trucks were stuck, parked up to 30 kilometres (19 mi) from the crossings. Waiting time for trucks to cross the border was about one week. On 27 November, the blockade was extended to a fourth crossing. By February 2024, the blockade had expanded to all major crossings, including railways, and protestors had spilt some grain onto the ground from train transport. The blockade had become a crisis. On 27 February 2024, about 10,000 farmers marched in Warsaw demanding a ban on food imports from Ukraine.

In April 2024, the Polish government offered to repatriate Ukrainian men of military age living in Poland to Ukraine to be drafted into the Ukrainian army. It is estimated that there are about 300–400,000 Ukrainian men living in Poland.

After a heated meeting between US President Trump and President Zelenskyy at the White House, Prime Minister Donald Tusk, who previously met with Trump as President of the European Council, expressed support for Zelenskyy and Ukraine, writing on social media: "Dear @ZelenskyyUa, dear Ukrainian friends, you are not alone." Tusk was the first world leader to comment about the event on social media. President Andrzej Duda, a supporter of both Ukraine and Trump, said that Zelenskyy "should return to this table, sit calmly at this table, remain calm, negotiate a solution that will make Ukraine safe".

On September 10, 2025, Poland shot down multiple drones that entered its airspace during a large-scale Russian attack on Ukraine, marking the first known instance of a NATO member firing weapons during the Russian invasion of Ukraine. Polish authorities reported that 19 aerial objects had crossed into its territory, with those deemed a threat being destroyed. Prime Minister Donald Tusk described the incident as a "large-scale provocation," stated that the alliance takes the threat "very seriously," and invoked Article 4 of the North Atlantic Treaty to initiate consultations with NATO allies. Countries bordering Ukraine had previously reported occasional Russian missiles or drones entering their airspace during the war, but not on such a large scale, and they were not known to have shot them down. Several European officials, NATO, and EU foreign policy chief Kaja Kallas characterized the incursion as intentional and an escalation of the war in Ukraine. According to Ukrainian president Volodymyr Zelenskyy, at least eight Iranian-made Shahed drones had been aimed towards Poland, and "a strong response is needed." The operation involved NATO aircraft and surveillance assets, and no casualties were reported, though a house in Wyryki-Kolonia, about 16 kilometers (9.9 mi) from the Ukrainian border, was severely damaged. The incident prompted renewed calls within the European Union and NATO for strengthened air defenses and increased sanctions on Russia, with European Commission President Ursula von der Leyen urging further measures.

In 2025, former Polish President Andrzej Duda claimed that Ukraine wanted to drag Poland into the war, stating that Zelenskyy had asked him to admit a Russian missile was behind the 2022 explosion.

Following the 2026 Poland–Ukraine diplomatic crisis, leader of the Front party Krzysztof Tołwiński sent medical supplies for Russian soldiers, which his party purchased in Belarus.

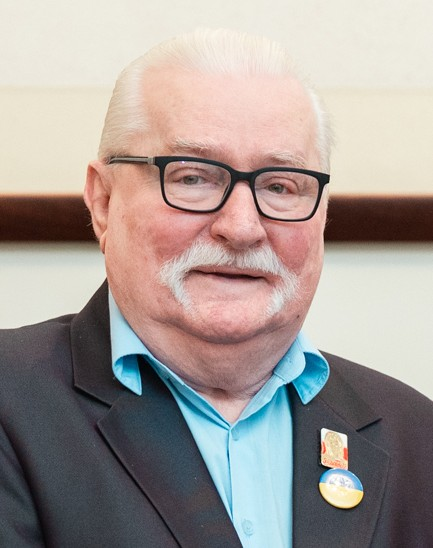
Symbolic Solidarity figure and former Polish president Lech Wałęsa, previously a supporter of Zelenskyy, tore a lapel pin of the Ukrainian flag (pictured) from his chest publicly upon hearing of the naming of the unit "Heroes of the UPA"

Since May 2026, relations between the two countries have deteriorated significantly. The reburial and state funeral of Andriy Melnyk, whose remains were reburied with full state honors on 25 May 2026, at the National Military Memorial Cemetery near Kyiv, precipitated this. Melnyk was a Nazi collaborator and faction leader in the Organization of Ukrainian Nationalists; however, the New York Times claims his culpability in the ethnic cleansing of Polish people is debated among historians. Melnyk's reburial also caused diplomatic outcries in Israel and from Yad Vashem due to his co-responsibility for pogroms of Jews in Ukraine. It was also reported by the head of the Ukrainian Institute of National Remembrance that a similar honoring and reburial for controversial figure Stepan Bandera, and a figure regarded by many Poles as highly polarizing, was not being ruled out, with his family agreeing that his remains should eventually be moved from Munich.

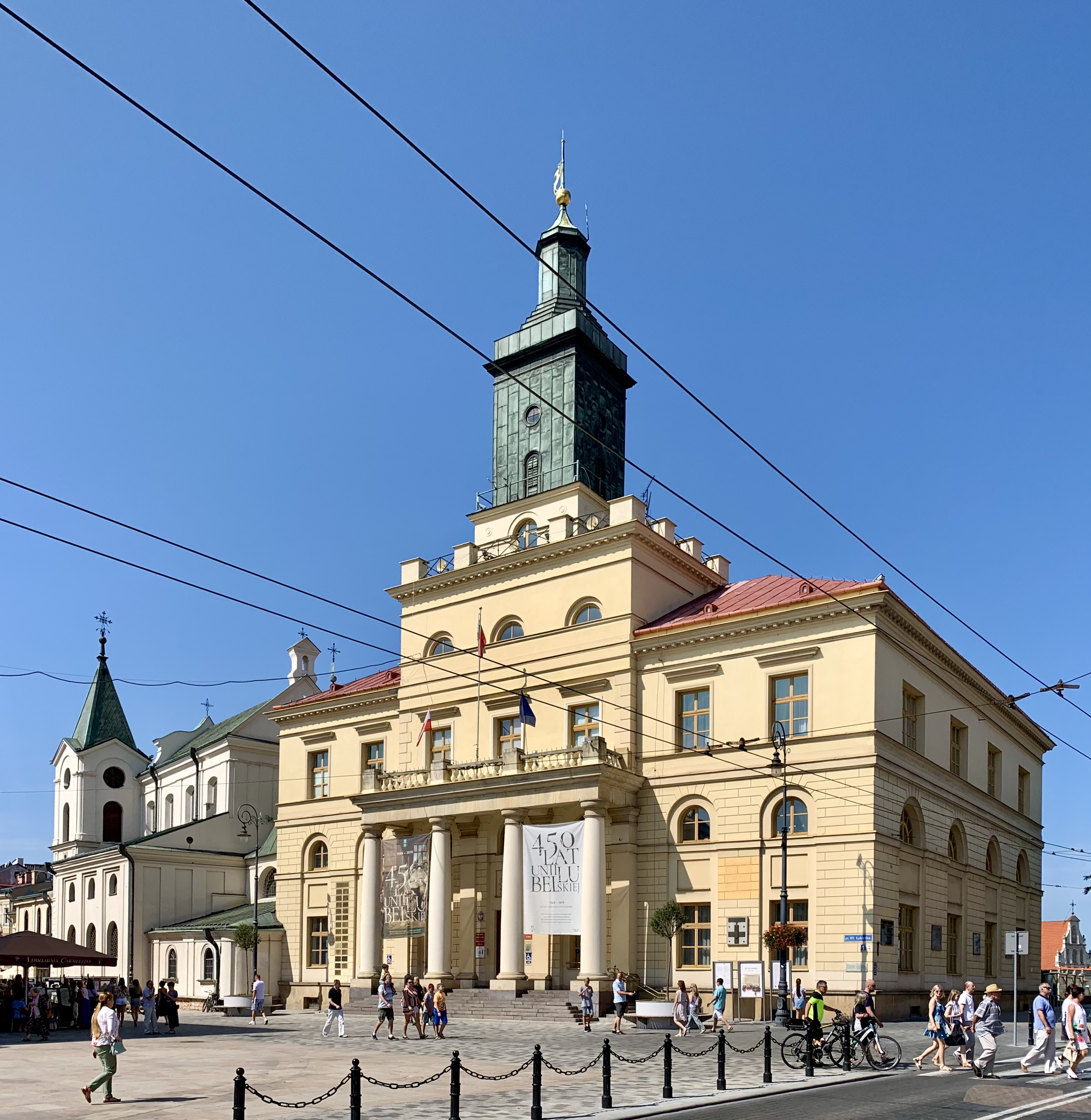
The Lublin New Town Hall removed a Ukrainian flag following Zelenskyy's decree

Relations worsened following an incident on 27 May 2026, where Ukrainian president Volodymyr Zelenskyy named an elite commando unit of the Ukrainian military "Heroes of the Ukrainian Insurgent Army", after a Nazi collaborationist guerrilla formation which is widely seen in Poland as having played a leading role in the killing of about 100,000 Polish civilians in the massacres of Poles in Volhynia and Eastern Galicia, declared by the Polish parliament in 2025 as a genocide while the common Ukrainian term is the "Volhynia tragedy". The move was criticized widely in Poland and across the political spectrum, with former Prime Minister Leszek Miller calling it "spitting in the face of Poles" and urging President Karol Nawrocki to strip Zelenskyy of the Order of the White Eagle. President Nawrocki criticized Zelenskyy's move "in the harshest terms" and announced that the 8th June meeting of the Chapter of the Order of the White Eagle would place stripping Zelenskyy of the order at the top of its agenda.

Mayor of Lviv, Ukraine, Andriy Sadovyi, stated that he'd "like to see how [Nawrocki would] come to collect [the order] from the Ukrainian military considering he had not dared to cross the [Ukrainian] border thus far". Sadovyi's statement was seen as provocative in Poland. Nawrocki questioned Poland's continued support for Ukraine's membership in the European Union and NATO, saying that Ukraine's actions were "unbecoming of the broader European family", escalating the dispute from historical to strategic ramifications. Deputy Foreign Minister Marcin Bosacki summoned the Ukrainian ambassador to lodge a formal protest. Former Polish ambassador to Ukraine, Bartosz Cichocki, returned a state honour given to him previously by Zelenskyy as a sign of his protest against the Ukrainian move. The deputy speaker of the Sejm, Krzysztof Bosak, stated that Ukraine should be blocked from EU candidacy and that the Polish government should stop using Starlink services used by the Ukrainian armed forces.

Other figures across the political spectrum criticized the move, including Prime Minister Donald Tusk, Minister of National Defence Władysław Kosiniak-Kamysz, and government coalition partner Robert Biedroń. Former leading figure of Solidarity and president of Poland (1990–1995), Lech Wałęsa, who had previously been a strong supporter of Ukraine and Zelenskyy, tore a lapel pin of the Ukrainian flag from his chest publicly on stage upon hearing of the news. The Polish city of Lublin removed the Ukrainian flag from its town hall. Some political scientists in Poland observed a social shift toward anti-Ukrainian sentiment becoming more widely accepted not only in far-right circles but unanimously across the political spectrum, with the ruling centrist liberal-conservative Civic Coalition under Prime Minister Tusk being seen as pivoting from its earlier pro-Ukrainian stance and the opposition parties also capitalizing on the shift in attitudes.

Nawrocki's reaction and his proposal to strip Zelenskyy of the Order of the White Eagle was largely ascribed to the spread of the news about the Ukrainian unit's naming on social media. The online media of Poles and Ukrainians showed a split opinion, with Res Futura Data House stating that according to its analysis, 97.4% of Polish online social media users supported Nawrocki's action in stripping the order from Zelenskyy and that 98% of Ukrainian online social media users supported Zelenskyy's use of the name of the Ukrainian Insurgent Army.

In early June, Polish authorities supported a proposal to revoke access to temporary EU protection for Ukrainian fighting-age men, allowing for their repatriation to Ukraine for conscription. This was presented as a gesture to improve relations with Ukrainian authorities, who favour repatriations to compensate for manpower shortages in soldiers fighting against the Russian invasion.

This was seen as the worst diplomatic crisis between Poland and Ukraine since 2017, when the chief of the Ukrainian Institute of National Remembrance, Volodymyr Viatrovych, prohibited the exhumation of Polish civilian victims of the Insurgent Army from Ukrainian soil under the condition that Poland must rebuild the monument to the Insurgent Army in Hruszowice, a decision that Ukraine reversed in 2023, when relations improved through to 2026, particularly in the final years of former President Andrzej Duda's term.

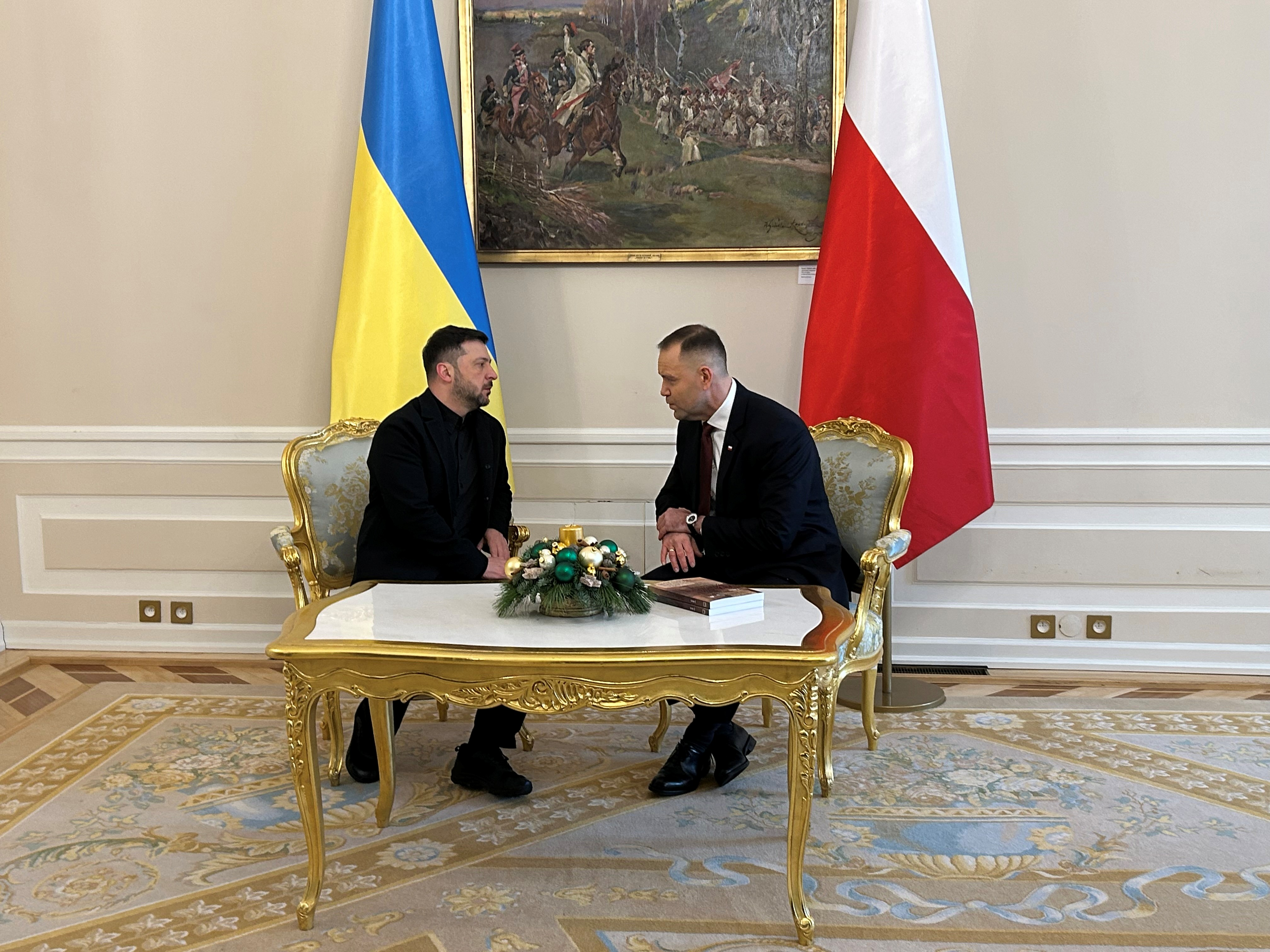
Polish and Ukrainian presidents Karol Nawrocki and Volodymyr Zelenskyy photographed during a bilateral meeting in December 2025

On 19 June, Nawrocki officially revoked Zelenskyy's state decoration, as previously considered by Nawrocki during the initial fallout of the Ukrainian president's decision to name a military unit "Heroes of the Ukrainian Insurgent Army." This caused a wave of negative reactions in Ukraine, with Ukrainian foreign minister Andrii Sybiha saying "no foreign president has a right to dictate our history to us" and returning his Republic of Poland Order of Merit in protest on the day of Nawrocki's decision. Zelenskyy later announced he would mail his order back personally to the Chancellery of the Polish president, and posted proof on his social media. Head of Zelenskyy's presidential office, Kyrylo Budanov, followed suit by returning his own order, and even Vasyl Bodnar, Ukrainian ambassador to Poland, did the same. Former prime minister of Ukraine Arseniy Yatsenyuk warned of an unprecedented escalation of mutual animosity.

Three former presidents of Ukraine: Leonid Kuchma, Viktor Yushchenko (who had previously caused controversy in Poland by giving OUN-B founder Stepan Bandera the award "Hero of Ukraine"), and Petro Poroshenko, all announced on 20 June their intention to return awards given to them in previous years (as far back as 1997) by the Republic of Poland as a sign of protest against the Polish state.

As a protest against Zelenskyy's decision, deputy marshal of the Senate Michał Kamiński returned his Ukrainian awards. Additionally, former Polish prime minister Jarosław Kaczyński announced that he would return his Order of Prince Yaroslav the Wise as an "expression of his attitude towards the Ukrainian elites and an act of loyalty to President Nawrocki". Moreover, Polish politicians Mariusz Błaszczak, Zbigniew Rau, Marek Kuchciński, and Adam Bielan stated that they would return their Ukrainian awards out of respect for the victims of the Volhynia and Eastern Galicia massacre, out of loyalty to Karol Nawrocki, and to "express their opposition to Ukrainian political elites escalating the conflict".

Volodymyr Zelenskyy withdrew his planned attendance at a 25 June European conference for the rebuilding of Ukraine in Gdańsk. He cited a recommendation from Ukraine's foreign ministry against doing so. Prime minister Yulia Svyrydenko attended instead. Polish political commentators stated that Zelenskyy had previously cancelled a plan to fly from Rzeszów–Jasionka Airport to the 52nd G7 summit, and instead flew from Chișinău.

On 23 June, several Polish and Ukrainian news media, including Gazeta Wyborcza, OKO.press, TOK FM, Newsweek Polska, Onet.pl, Polityka, Ukrainska Pravda, European Pravda, Espreso TV, Slawa TV, and Press Club Ukraine, published a joint statement declaring that they were "aware of the tragic chapters in Polish-Ukrainian history" and "that politicians [were] exploit[ing] [those historical events] for their own ends". The media stated that the "[Polish and Ukrainian] shared task today is to stop Putin's Russia. The time for a serious conversation about the past, acknowledgment of guilt, and reconciliation will come when Ukraine – with the support of its allies – defeats the aggressor". The media stated their view that Polish and Ukrainian "politicians must show wisdom and good judgment, seek mutual understanding, and find ways out of the crisis" and that Polish and Ukrainian societies "must continue to support one another".

On 26 June, Polish foreign minister Radosław Sikorski criticised both Zelenskyy and Nawrocki. Sikorski stated that Zelenskyy "should have thought: all right, the Ukrainian Insurgent Army fought against Soviet rule, but it also killed Poles," and instead an honour could have been given to "a specific hero who fought against Soviet occupation"; and that Nawrocki's response "was inappropriate, because it humiliated the president of Ukraine personally."

From 1 July 2026, Ukrainian refugees, including the elderly, were no longer provided with free refugee accommodation to encourage Ukrainians to return home after four years of support, or to support themselves financially. The cost of the support was estimated at 40 billion złoty (£8 billion). This followed Polish Prime Minister Donald Tusk's support for proposals to reduce benefits in January 2025.

On 18 September 2026, Poland joined a coalition involving Ukraine and other allies aimed at developing anti-ballistic missile capabilities. Polish Prime Minister Donald Tusk announced the decision during the Carpathian Eight summit in western Ukraine and reiterated Poland's support for Ukraine.

On 20 October 2026, the Lviv Regional Council voted to designate 2027 as the "Year of Roman Shukhevych (military commander of UPA, who is considered responsible for ethnic cleansing of Polish, Jewish, and Romani civilians), the Ukrainian Insurgent Army (military wing of the Organisation of Ukrainian Nationalists), and Oleh Olzhych (Ukrainian poet, political activist, and the head of OUN-M)." In Poland, both President Karol Nawrocki's sovereigntist camp and Prime Minister Donald Tusk's liberal camp condemned the Lviv Regional Council's decision and issued official statements, while Polish Foreign Minister Radosław Sikorski signed a motion that barred Sviatoslav Sheremeta, a deputy of the Lviv Regional Council, from entering the Schengen Area for five years.

On 22 October, the dispute escalated into another major diplomatic rift, the second of the year, as the Polish government suspended talks about support for Ukraine. Additionally, numerous Ukrainian media outlets, citing an anonymous government official, reported that, as a result of the Lviv council's actions, Poland allegedly suspended a planned delivery of a significant package of Polish weapons to Ukraine; however, Poland's Ministry of National Defence denied these allegations soon afterward.

== Aid to Ukraine ==
- As of 23 September 2022, more than 6,500,000 refugees had crossed the border into Poland. See Ukrainian refugee crisis. Refugees were covered by the social assistance program, including financial assistance, by the health care system, and school-age children by the education system. As of 30 June 2023, the number of Ukrainian refugees who are beneficiaries of temporary protection in Poland has decreased to 977,400, or 24% of all Ukrainian refugees in Europe.
- Ukrainian refugees had the right to move free of charge in Poland through the public transport system from 26 February until the end of May 2022.
- Wounded Ukrainian soldiers and children evacuated by sanitary trains are in many situations hospitalized in Poland.
- More than 1,500 tons of food delivered to Kharkiv and Zaporizhia organized by the Chancellery of the Prime Minister and RARS.
- As of 28 September 2022, Polish Institute of Economy estimates that 70% of Poles have donated for Ukraine and Ukrainians more than 10 billion PLN (about 0.38% GDP) worth of aid.
- As of 26 February 2026, Poland has purchased over 20,500 Starlink terminals for Ukraine.
- In conjunction with the United Kingdom, Poland support the building of two villages in Western and central Ukraine for internally displaced civilians (March 2023).
- 7 June 2023 Poland pledged 10 water tankers with a capacity of 18,000 litres each and 10 high-capacity pump to aid those effected by the Destruction of the Kakhovka Dam. €25 million donated to the European Investment Bank EU for Ukraine Fund for the reconstruction of Ukraine October 2024.
- €3,127,751 Contribution to the Ukraine Energy Support Fund.
- 400 generators provided to Kyiv Oblast January 2026.
- €1.95 million of generators pledged November 2026.

== See also ==
- United States and the Russo-Ukrainian war
