= Federation of Jewish Communities =

Federation of Jewish Communities may refer to

- Federation of Jewish Communities of Russia
- Federation of Jewish Communities of the CIS
- Federation of Jewish Communities of Ukraine
- Schweizerischer Israelitischer Gemeindebund (Swiss Federation of Jewish Communities)
- Federation of the Jewish Communities in Romania
- Federation of Jewish Communities in the Czech Republic, umbrella organization of Czech Jews
