= Raphael Rutman =

Rabbi

- רפאל ראטמאן

Personal life
- Born: November 18, 1972 London, United Kingdom

Religious life
- Religion: Judaism

Jewish leader
- Synagogue: Podil, Kyiv

Raphael Rutman (Modern Hebrew: רפאל ראטמאן, born November 18, 1972) — is a Chabad Rabbi and a Shliach ("emissary") of the Lubavitcher Rebbe Menachem Mendel Schneerson. Executive Chairman of the Federation of Jewish Communities of Ukraine.

== Biography ==
He received his secondary education in the United Kingdom. Received a bachelor's degree in "Higher Jewish Education" in the United States. Became an envoy of the Lubavitcher Rebbe in Ukraine in 1993. Opened many children's social programs in Ukraine. Also, with his direct participation, the first Jewish orphanages for orphans in Ukraine were opened. Subsequently, he opened Jewish orphanages in many cities of Ukraine. On the initiative of Rutman, winter and summer Jewish children's camps began their work. Created children's educational and entertainment clubs throughout the CIS.

He opened and manages two schools, primary and secondary in Kyiv, as well as a junior rabbinical college (Cheder). Leads the international Jewish community for diplomats and local and foreign businessmen in Kyiv. He is the Executive Vice Chairman of the Council of the Federation of Jewish Communities of Ukraine, an organization that includes all the rabbis of Ukraine. Responsible for all diplomatic and international relations of the Federation of Jewish Communities of Ukraine.

Married, wife Devorah was born in Miami, has 7 children.

== Activity ==
On August 25, 2020, at a meeting with the Ukrainian President, he blew the shofar.

11 October 2021 President of the European Council Charles Michel lit a candle near the Menorah monument and, Vice chairman of the board of the Federation of Jewish Communities of Ukraine, prayed in memory of those killed in the Babyn Yar tragedy in a symbolic synagogue.

On December 3, 2021, lighting the Menorah on Maidan Nezalezhnosti in Kyiv.

In January 2022 had a prayer at International symposium dedicated to the Babyn Yar massacre and Eastern European Holocaust ahead of Holocaust Remembrance Day to be held in Kyiv. The following year, he repeated the visit with the participation of the head of the Office of the President of Ukraine Andriy Yermak and the President Volodymyr Zelenskyy. Attended a meeting of the Jewish community with the head of the President's office.

In April 2022, was in Kyiv before the start of Pesach and was interviewed by CNN’s Jake Tapper. He gave him items for a full Seder and put on Teffilin. Also, April 15, 2022 with Poland Ambassador to Ukraine Bartosz Cichocki congratulated the Jewish population of Ukraine on Pesach.

As it turned out from a letter to the President of the European Parliament Roberta Metsola, since the beginning of the invasion of the Russian troops, he has been helping socially unprotected civilians. European Commissioner Olivér Várhelyi said that the work of Rabbi Raphael Rutman, as leaders of the trade union, as well as his colleagues and volunteers, is exemplary in protecting and supporting the people of Ukraine.

On September 29, 2023, he held a ceremony honoring the memory of those who killed in Babi Yar, with the participation of the President of Ukraine and the head of the Office of the President of Ukraine.

For several years in a row, he organizes the lighting of the largest Hanukkah in Europe. Every evening of Hanukkah 2023, ambassadors from many countries of the world came to Ukraine to participate in the lighting, including the ambassadors of Israel, US, Canada, Italy, Austria, France, Germany, Argentina, Great Britain, Switzerland, Sweden, Finland, Slovenia, and Japan. Kyiv Mayor Vitali Klitschko and various Ukrainian dignitaries were also present, as well as the head of the EU mission in Ukraine, the head of the UN mission in Ukraine, and the head of the Nativ in Israel. This building was vandalized twice – in 2021 and 2023. In addition to the main lighting on the Maidan Nezalezhnosti square, it also organizes the installation of Hanukkah and daily lighting in all major 5-star hotels in Kyiv, where Kyiv residents, as well as foreign dignitaries and hotel guests join in the lighting. Also separately with the participation of the head of state.

== Literature ==
- Sarah Garibov. Memories for a Blessing Jewish Mourning Rituals and Commemorative Practices in Postwar Belarus and Ukraine, 1944–1991. University of Michigan, 2017.
