= Rutman =

Rutman is a surname. Notable people with the surname include:

- Darrett B. Rutman (1929–1997), American historian
- Heather Rutman, American blogger
- Leo Rutman, American writer and playwright
- Robert Rutman (1931–2021), German-American visual artist, musician, composer, and instrument builder
- Raphael Rutman, Rabbi
