= Agnieszka Romaszewska-Guzy =

Polish Journalist

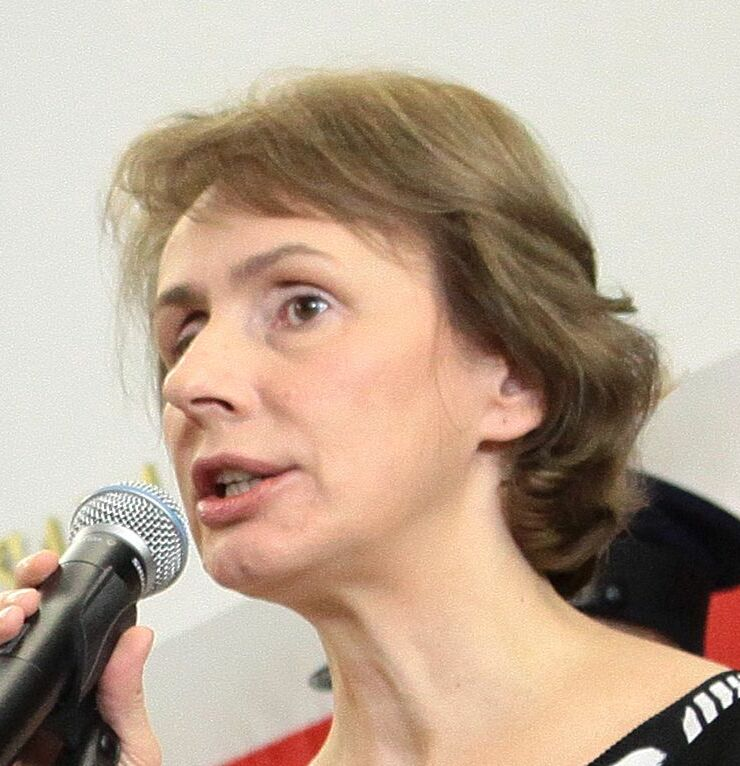
- Agnieszka Romaszewska-Guzy (2014)
- Born: 15 January 1962 (age 64); Warsaw, Poland
- Education: University of Warsaw
- Occupation: Journalist
- Employer(s): Telewizja Polska, Belsat TV
- Spouse: Jarosław Guzy
- Parents: Zbigniew Romaszewski (father); Zofia Romaszewska (mother)

Agnieszka Maria Romaszewska-Guzy (born 15 January 1962) is a Polish press and television journalist, director of Biełsat TV (2007–2024) and since 2011, vice-president of the Association of Polish Journalists.

== Biography ==
Romaszewska-Guzy is the daughter of Zofia Romaszewska and Zbigniew Romaszewski.

After the imposition of martial law, she was interned for five months. Until 1989, she cooperated with the opposition movement, participated, inter alia, in the Freedom and Peace Movement. In 1987, she graduated from the Faculty of History at the University of Warsaw. She was a spokesman for the National Founding Committee of the Independent Students' Association (NZS), and then a member of the National Audit Committee of the NZS. Her husband, Jarosław Guzy, was the first chairman of the NZS.

During her doctoral fellowship in the United States, Romaszewska-Guzy was an intern at The Washington Times, The Washington Post and the weekly The New Republic. In 1991, she worked in Życie Warszawy. In 1992, she was employed by Telewizja Polska, she was the head of reporters and the deputy head of TVP News. Later on TVP she was a national reporter, publisher of Wiadomości, and, inter alia, published the Catholic news magazine Czasy.

In 1999, Romaszewska-Guzy returned to the editorial office of Wiadomości, she reported on the events in the Balkans. She has made six reportages and documentaries, including W cieniu KGB, Misjonarze, Towarzysze i przyjaciele, and Cudza ojczyzna. In 2002, she was dismissed from TVP due to the reduction of employment, reinstated by the decision of the board in 2004. Until 2005, she was an international reporter (including in Belarus and Ukraine). For her journalistic activity, she was deported from Belarus by the Belarusian authorities, banned from entering the country for many years.

From 1998 to 2004, Romaszewska-Guzy sat on the main board of the Association of Polish Journalists. Works in the Poland-Belarus Civic Education Center Association. In 2006, she was appointed the deputy director of TV Polonia for programming, in 2007, she became the director of TV Polonia. She developed the concept of creating a TVP thematic channel devoted to Belarusian issues. In 2007, she became the director of Belsat TV. In March 2009, she was dismissed from these functions by acting President of TVP Piotr Farfał, among others for publicly challenging the decision of TVP's management board. The decision by Farfał about the removal of Romaszewska-Guza from the management of "Belsat TV" by many observers was called "a gift for Lukashenka". Under the pressure of public opinion and the Ministry of Foreign Affairs, which is the most important donor of "Belsat TV", after a week she was reinstated as the director of "Belsat TV". In 2010, she became the acting director of the TVP branch in Białystok. On March 18, 2024, she was dismissed from TVP for disciplinary reasons.

Romaszewska-Guzy served as vice-president of the Association of Polish Journalists in the 2011–2014 term and again in the 2014–2017 term.

== Decorations ==
In 2007, Romaszewska-Guzy was awarded the Knight's Cross of the Order of Polonia Restituta by President Lech Kaczyński. In 2017, she was decorated by President Andrzej Duda with the Cross of Freedom and Solidarity.
