= Jacek Bazański =

Polish politician (born 1958)

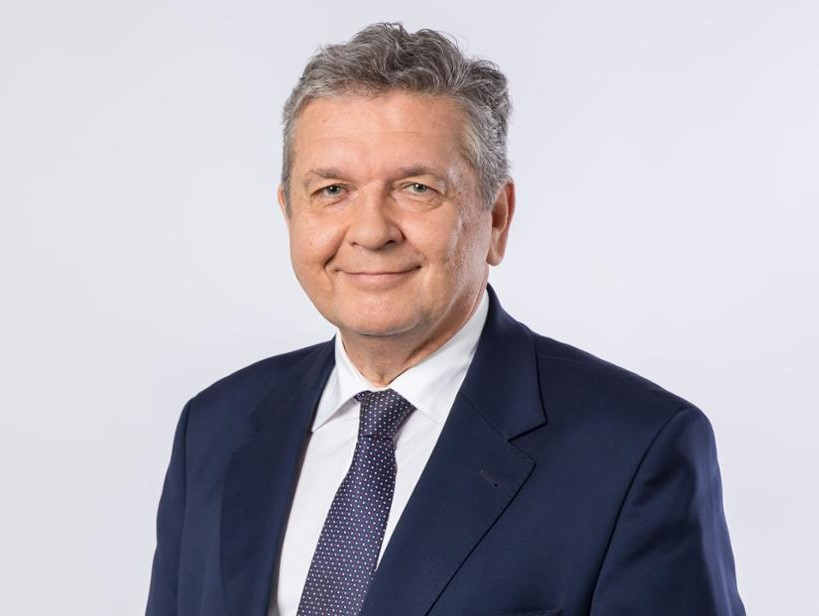

Poland Ambassador to Argentina
- In office 13 January 2010 – 30 January 2015
- Preceded by: Zdzisław Jan Ryn
- Succeeded by: Marek Pernal

Poland Ambassador to Kenya
- In office March 2018 – 31 March 2023
- Preceded by: Marek Ziółkowski
- Succeeded by: Mirosław Gojdź

Personal details
- Born: 11 August 1958 (age 68) Warsaw, Poland
- Spouse: Anna Bazańska
- Children: three
- Education: University of Warsaw
- Profession: Diplomat

Jacek Andrzej Bazański (born 11 August 1958, Warsaw) is a Polish diplomat. He was serving as the Polish ambassador to Argentina (2010–2015) and Kenya (2018–2023).

== Early life ==
Jacek Bazański graduated with a degree in Romance studies from the University of Warsaw in 1982. Two years later he became a certified French language translator. Bazański was also educated at the National School of Public Administration.

== Diplomatic career ==
In the 1980s, Bazański joined the Ministry of Foreign Affairs and worked both domestically and abroad. He has been a member of the diplomatic missions to Kinshasa and Rome. Bazański also served as deputy ambassador to Paris and the Hague.

From 13 January 2010 to 30 January 2015, Bazański served as Polish ambassador to Argentina. Later, he was the director of the Inspectorate of the Foreign Service. In March 2018, Bazański became Ambassador to Kenya, accredited also to Madagascar, Mauritius, Seychelles, Somalia and Uganda. He presented his letter of credence to president Uhuru Kenyatta on 4 May 2018. He ended his term on 31 March 2023.

Besides Polish and French, Bazański speaks English, Spanish and Italian languages.

== Personal life ==
He is married to Anna Bazańska. She serves as Polish consul in Nairobi. Together they have three children.
