= Petro Mohyla Black Sea State University =

Public university in Mykolaiv, Ukraine

Petro Mohyla Black Sea National University
- Черноморський національний університет імені Петра Могили
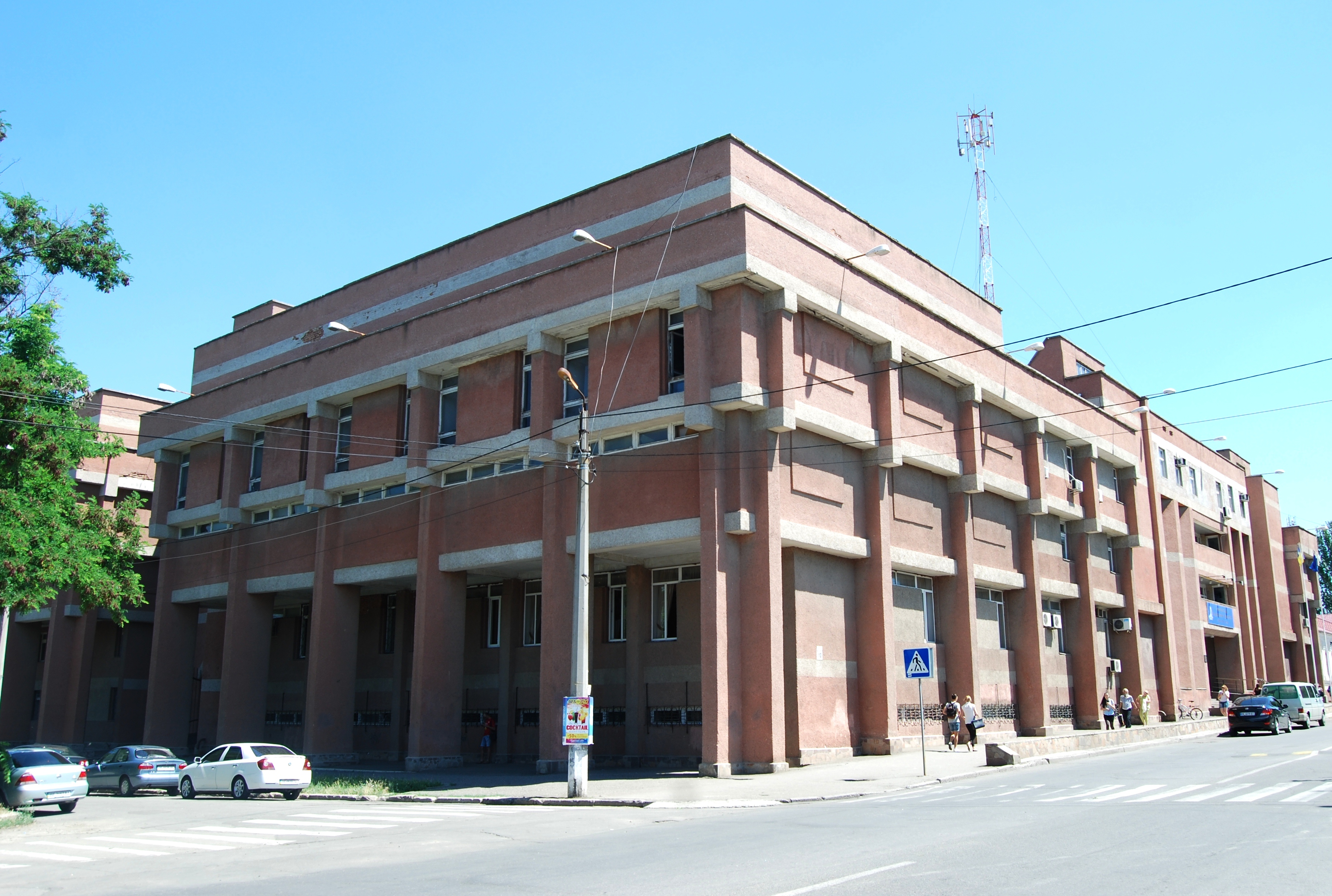
- Main building
- Former name: Petro Mohyla Black Sea State University (Petro Mohyla BSSU)
- Type: National
- Established: January 17, 1996 (as Mykolaiv branch of National University "Kyiv-Mohyla Academy")
- Affiliations: Ministry of Education and Science of Ukraine
- Location: Mykolaiv, Ukraine
- Campus: Urban
- Language: Ukrainian, English
- Website: chmnu.edu.ua

The Petro Mohyla Black Sea National University is a Ukrainian national university in Mykolaiv.

== History ==
January 17, 1996 Mykolaiv branch of National University "Kyiv-Mohyla Academy" was founded according to the decision of NUKMA and certified by the Resolution of the Cabinet of Ministers of Ukraine (July 3, 1996).

March 13, 2002 Petro Mohyla Mykolaiv State Humanitarian University was founded on the basis of Mykolaiv branch of National University "Kyiv-Mohyla Academy" according to the Order No.112-р of the Cabinet of Ministers of Ukraine.

December 10, 2008 Petro Mohyla Mykolaiv State Humanitarian University was reorganized into Petro Mohyla Black Sea State University (Petro Mohyla BSSU) according to the Order No.1521-р of the Cabinet of Ministers of Ukraine.

In 2009, the University joined the Great Charter of Universities and the European University Association. It is the only institution of higher education, which, in 2011, represented Ukraine and its system of teaching at the Talloires Network Leaders Conference (TNLC) of over 250 universities around the world.

On 14 June 2016, Petro Mohyla BSSU achieved the status of the national university by the Decree of the President Petro Poroshenko.

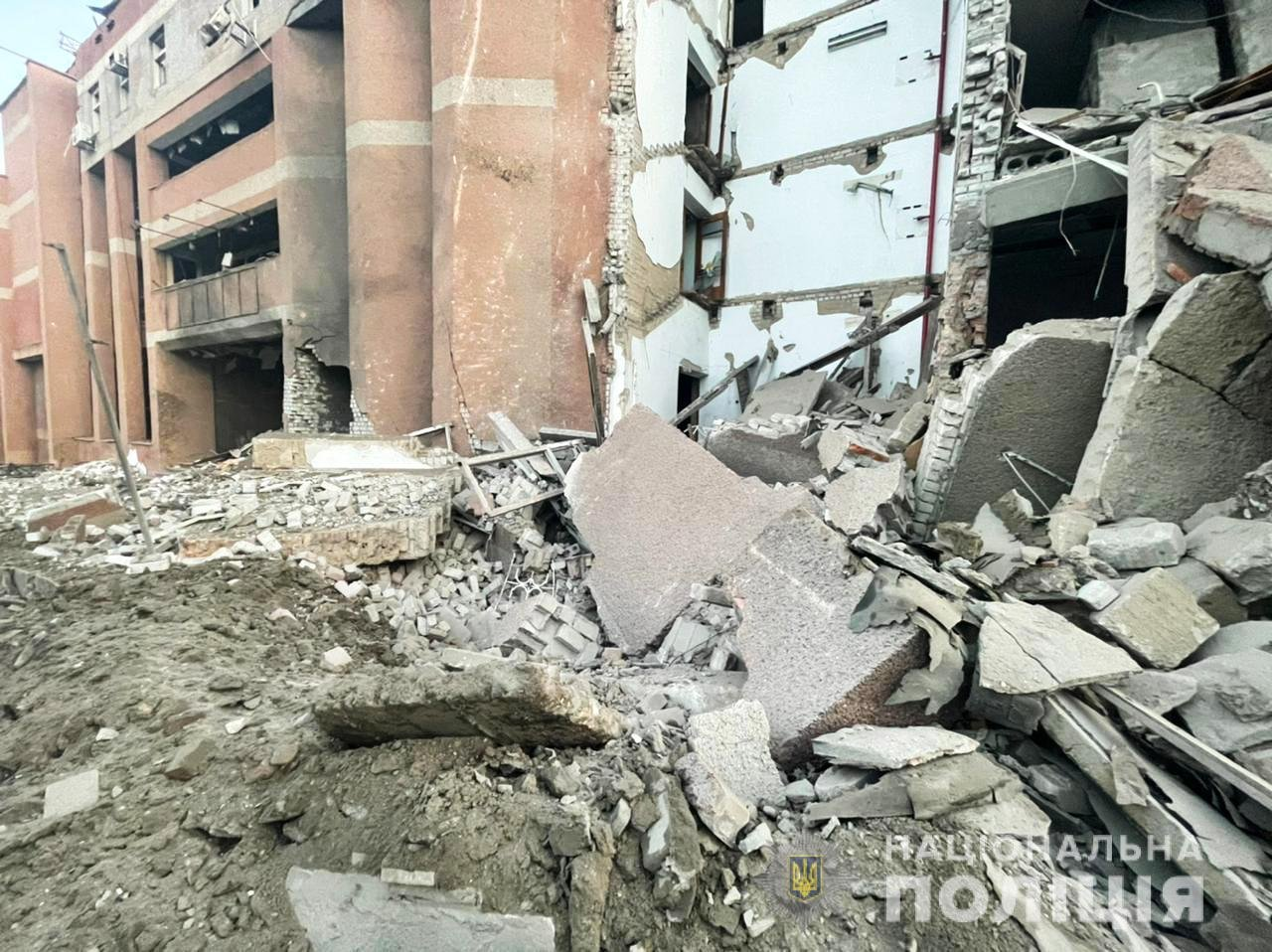
The university after shelling in 2022

On 17 August 2022, during Russian invasion of Ukraine, the university was hit by two rockets. Two days later, Russian army shelled it with two more rockets S-300.

== Modern days ==
4 institutions and 6 departments form the basis of Petro Mohyla Black Sea National University. It offers training which gives opportunity to become BA and MA in economics, law, political science, international relations, history, sociology and social work, public administration. Teaching staff prepares doctors, ecologists, programmers, linguists, psychologists, managers and other highly paid professionals. The material base includes 11 university buildings, a library with a fund of 110,000 published sources (15 languages of the world); the information-computer center and 14 computer classes (free Wi-Fi); gyms; student dormitories etc.

There are post-graduate department in 12 specialties (theses in 9 of them could be protected in 5 specialized academic councils). Training is conducted in Ukrainian and English. Students have an opportunity to learn French, German, Spanish, Polish, Bulgarian, Korean, Chinese, Japanese, and Hebrew.

The University is recognized as the best university in Mykolaiv oblast (region) by the UNESCO international ranking "Top-100 Ukraine". On May 29, 2017, the results of "Top 200 Ukraine" (2016/2017) was published on the official site of the Center for International Projects "Yevroosvita" ("EuroEducation"). Accordingly, to the activity estimates, Petro Mohyla BSNU joined the top 50 universities in our country, ranking 44th line in the list and leading educational institutions of Mykolaiv oblast (region). In 2018, the university retains 44th position

According to international and national rankings PMBSNU consistently ranks among the top higher education institutions in Ukraine. The university actively participates in international academic mobility, offering student and faculty exchange programs with institutions in France, Germany, Norway, and the United States. To date, fifteen PMBSNU scientists and lecturers have been awarded diplomas and medals by the Phi Beta Delta Honor Society for International Scholars. The University holds a license to educate international students from various countries, including Armenia, Azerbaijan, Belarus, Canada, China, Georgia, Israel, Italy, Kazakhstan, Turkey and Uzbekistan. The university regularly hosts foreign lecturers, diplomats, and politicians for guest presentations and workshops. Since its foundation, more than 100 visiting lecturers from countries such as Australia, Japan, South Korea, Spain, Sweden, the United Kingdom, and the United States have conducted educational sessions at the university. Additionally, PMBSNU coordinates diplomatic visits and meetings with Extraordinary and Plenipotentiary Ambassadors from nations including Bulgaria, Germany, Poland, and Switzerland.

== Institutes and faculties ==
- Institute of Philology;
- Institute of Public Administration;
- Medical Institute;
- Teaching and Research Institute of Postgraduate Education;
- Faculty of Computer Science;
- Faculty of Economics;
- Faculty of Law;
- Faculty of Physical Education and Sport;
- Faculty of Political Science;
- Faculty of Sociology.

== Notable alumni ==
- Kristina Berdynskykh, journalist

== See also ==
List of universities in Ukraine
