= Mirosław Gojdź =

Polish politician

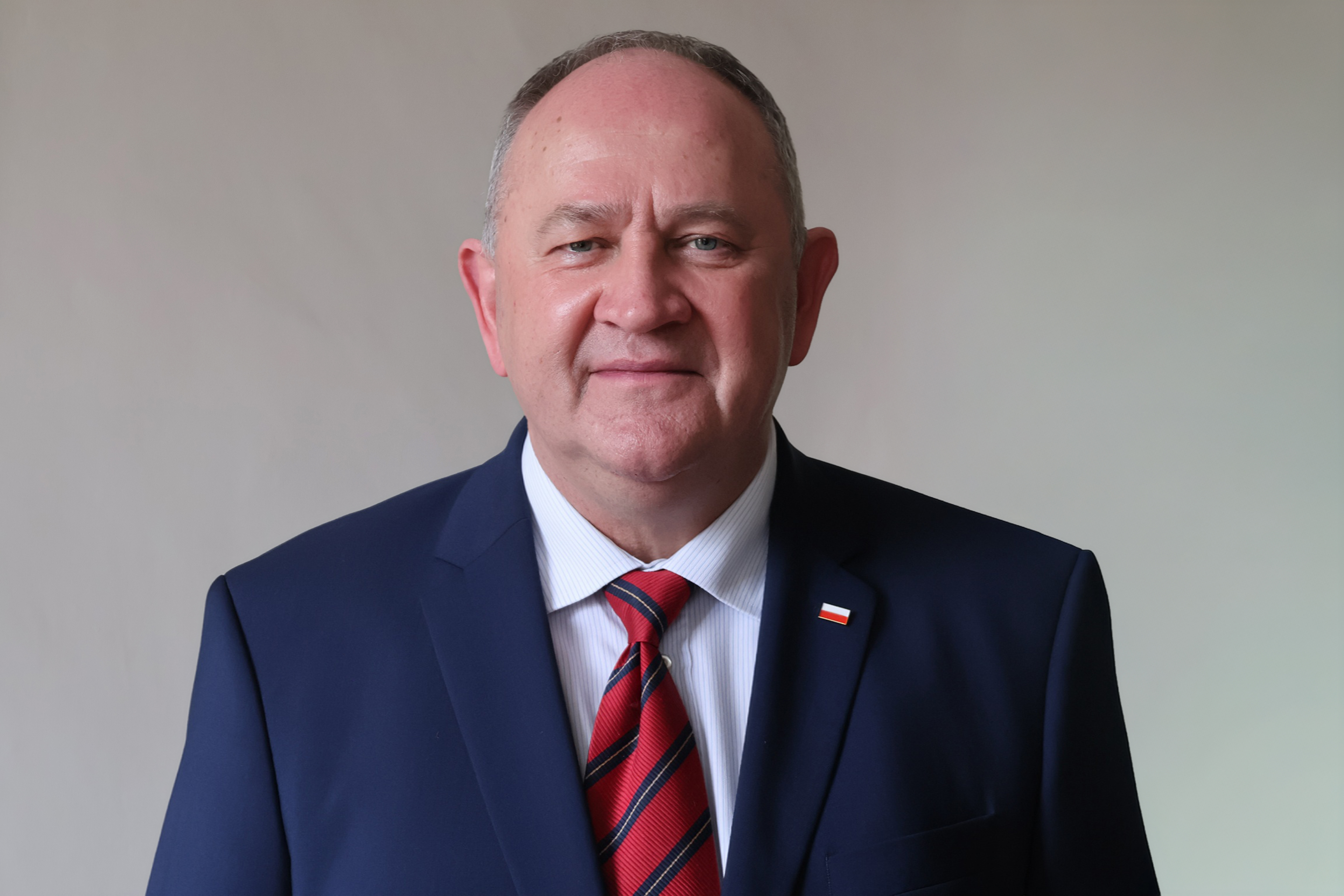
- Mirosław Gojdź (2025)

Poland Ambassador to Kenya
- In office 2023–2025
- Preceded by: Jacek Bazański
- Succeeded by: Marcin Kubiak

Personal details
- Born: 10 February 1962 (age 64) Lubawka, Poland
- Parent(s): Henryk Gojdź; Celina Gojdź (née Niewiarowska)
- Education: Polonia University in Częstochowa; University of Opole
- Profession: Politician, diplomat, dissident

Mirosław Gojdź (born 10 February 1962, Lubawka) is a Polish politician and diplomat, during communist period a dissident. From 2023 to 2025 he was serving as Polish ambassador to Kenya.

== Life ==
Gojdź graduated from English philology at the Polonia University in Częstochowa (1997) and political science at the University of Opole (1999). He completed also a postgraduate course in EU law and economy at the University of Wrocław (1998) and in hospitality industry and tourism at the University of Economy in Bydgoszcz (2007).

Between 1981 and 1989 he was member of the underground structure of the Solidarity trade union, the Fighting Solidarity, and the Confederation of Independent Poland. Following the introducing of the martial law in Poland on 13 December 1981, Gojdź was detained several times for political reasons. In 1980s, he worked for the KGHM Polska Miedź in Lubin. In 1987, he decided to move to Athens, Greece where he was running a construction company and headed local Solidarity bureau.

In 1989, he returned to Poland. From 1994 to 1998, he was city councilor of Lubin and, at the same time, deputy mayor of Lubin. From 1998 to 2010 he was councilor of the Lubin County. From 2002 to 2003 and from 2007 to 2010 he was also deputy head starosta of the Lubin County.

In 2012, Gojdź joined the diplomatic service, specializing in economic diplomacy. Between 2012 and 2018 he worked as a First Secretary and Councillor at the Embassy in Athens. In 2019, he became First Councillor at the Embassy in Nicosia, Cyprus, since 2022 as a Minister Councillor responsible also for Greece and Malta. On 21 March 2023, he was nominated Poland Ambassador to Kenya, accredited also to Mauritius, Seychelles, Uganda, Madagascar, Somalia, as well as to the United Nations Environment Programme and the United Nations Human Settlements Programme. He began his term on 7 June 2023. He ended his mission in December 2025.

== Honours ==
- Silver Cross of Merit, Poland (1998)
- Knight's Cross of the Order of Polonia Restituta, Poland (2008)
- Silver Medal of Merit for National Defence, Poland (2009)
- Cross of Freedom and Solidarity, Poland (2016)
- Honorary badge of Anti-communist activist or a person repressed for political reasons, Poland (2016)
- Cross of the Fighting Solidarity, Poland (2017)
- Pro Patria Medal, Poland (2021)
- Medal of the Centenary of Regained Independence, Poland (2021)
- Pro Bono Poloniae Medal, Poland (2022)

== Books ==
- Starym ojców naszych szlakiem : udział Gojdziów w walkach o niepodległość Polski podczas drugiej wojny światowej, Lublin, 2012, ISBN 9788393885701.
