= Tomasz Szatkowski =

Polish politician

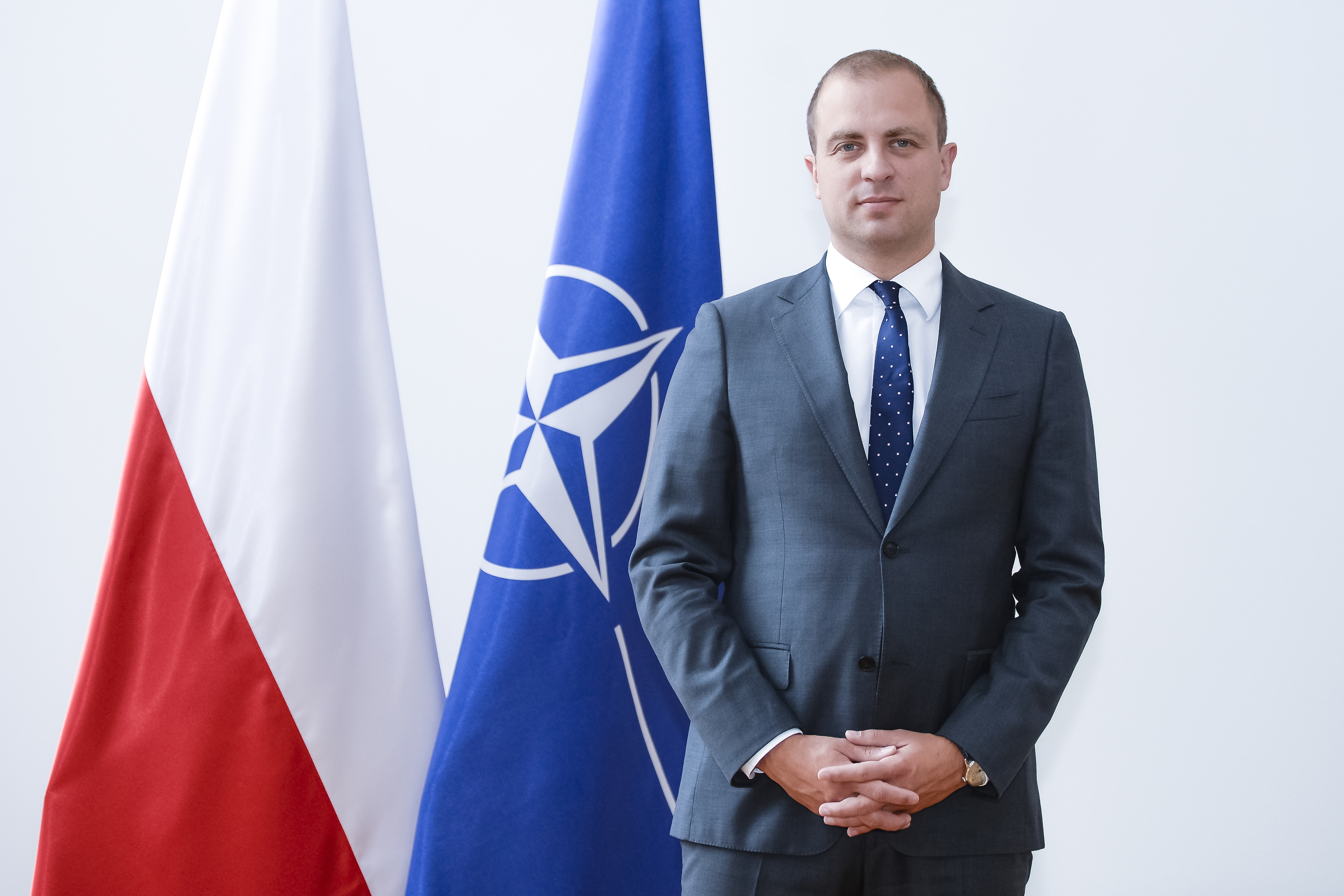

7th Poland Ambassador to NATO
- In office 23 July 2019 – 31 May 2024
- Preceded by: Marek Ziółkowski
- Succeeded by: Jacek Najder

Personal details
- Born: 10 May 1978 (age 48) Słupsk
- Education: University of Warsaw, King's College London
- Profession: politician, political scientist

Tomasz Szatkowski (born 10 May 1978) is a Polish politician and political scientist. From 2019 he has served as an ambassador to NATO. He is a specialist in national security domain, in particular defense and armaments policy.

== Life ==
Szatkowski was born in Słupsk. In his youth, Szatkowski had been a background actor, playing in movies by Andrzej Wajda and Jerzy Hoffman.

He holds an M.A. in law from the University of Warsaw. He also has degrees in postgraduate studies in national security (University of Warsaw) and war studies (King's College London), intelligence policy (King's College London). He has also been trained at the Naval Postgraduate School in Monterey and Defence Academy of the United Kingdom in Shrivenham.

He received scholarships from the UK Ministry of Defence (2004), the US Department of State (2007), and the German Marshall Fund (2013), among others. Szatkowski participated in the program of the Munich Security Conference Munich Young Leaders (2019).

He has held senior positions in the Polish state, defence industry, public media and the European Parliament. Between 2006 and 2008 he was member of the board of supervisors of Bumar-Labedy, in 2007 he became deputy president of the company. He was chief of the cabinet of deputy prime minister Przemysław Gosiewski and advisor to Zbigniew Wasserman. From 3 November 2009 to 18 December 2009 he was acting general director of Telewizja Polska (TVP). From 2009 to 2012 he worked as advisor on defense policy at the European Parliament. He was also member of the board of supervisors of TVP (2009–2011). He was also presiding the National Centre for Strategic Studies think tank. In 2015 he was invited by the president Andrzej Duda to the National Development Council – Security, Defense, Foreign Policy Section.

Between 17 November 2015 and 18 July 2019 he was the deputy minister of national defence, responsible for international affairs, organization of the 2016 NATO Summit in Warsaw, Strategic Defence Review, and negotiations with the Americans on increasing their military presence in Poland.

On 23 July 2019, Szatkowski was nominated Poland ambassador to NATO. He was recalled by new Polish government led by Donald Tusk on 31 May 2024.
