= Zdzisław Jan Ryn =

Polish diplomat (1938–2022)

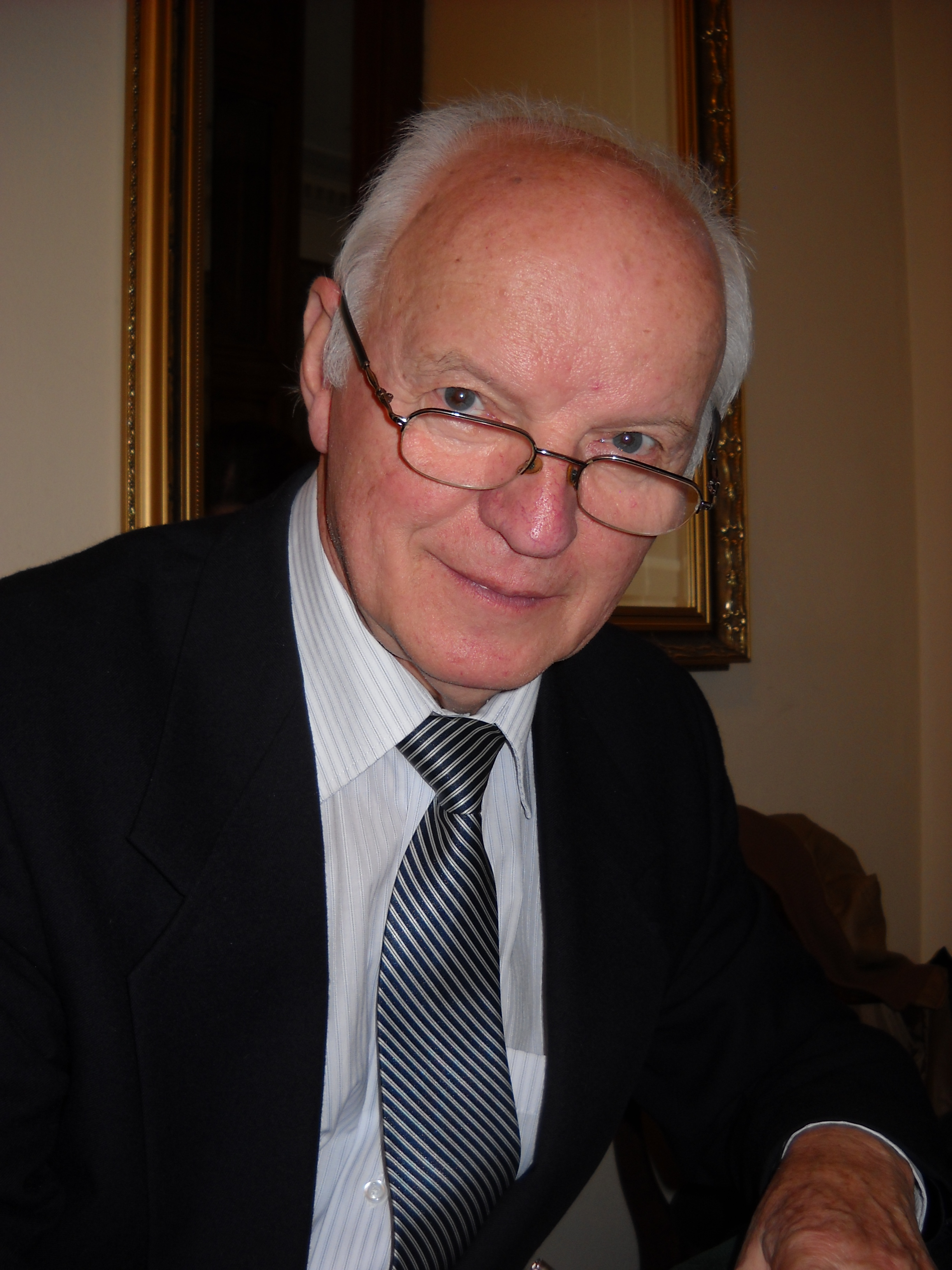
- Ryn in 2012

Polish Ambassador to Argentina
- In office 2007 – 30 June 2008
- Preceded by: Stanisław Stefan Paszczyk
- Succeeded by: Jacek Bazański

Polish Ambassador to Chile
- In office 1991–1997
- Preceded by: Zenon Rządziński
- Succeeded by: Daniel Passent

Personal details
- Born: 21 October 1938 Szczyrk, Poland
- Died: 6 February 2022 (aged 83) Kraków, Poland
- Education: Jagiellonian University Medical College

Zdzisław Jan Ryn (21 October 1938 – 6 February 2022) was a Polish diplomat. He served as Polish ambassador to Chile from 1991 to 1997 and Ambassador to Argentina from 2007 to 2008.

Jan Ryn died in Kraków on 6 February 2022, at the age of 83.
