= Jarosław Guzy =

Polish politician and businessman

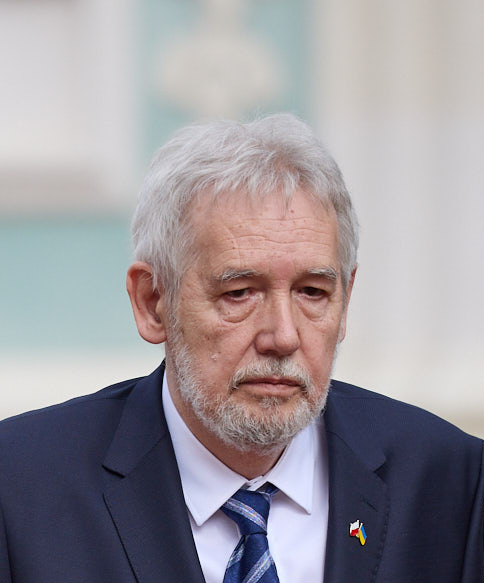
- Jarosław Guzy (2024)

Poland Ambassador to Ukraine
- In office 2023–2024
- Appointed by: Andrzej Duda
- President: Volodymyr Zelenskyy
- Preceded by: Bartosz Cichocki
- Succeeded by: Piotr Łukasiewicz

Personal details
- Born: 31 December 1955 (age 70) Kraków
- Spouse: Agnieszka Romaszewska-Guzy
- Education: Jagiellonian University
- Profession: politician, businessman, dissident

Jarosław Władysław Guzy (born 31 December 1955, in Kraków) is a Polish politician and businessman, first chairman of the Independent Students Union, between 2023 and 2024 serving as Ambassador to Ukraine.

From 1975 to 1981, Guzy studied sociology at the Jagiellonian University, cooperating in late 1970s with opposition organization Student Committee of Solidarity. In 1980, he became a member of the Independent Students Union, and in April 1981, was elected first chairman of the Union. During the martial law in Poland, Guzy, together with wife Agnieszka, was interned in prisons in Białołęka and Darłówko. After his release, he was under constant surveillance of the Communist secret services, Służba Bezpieczeństwa.

In 1988 Guzy left Poland for the United States, where he studied at the Yale University. In 1991, he returned to Poland, and became actively engaged in politics. Guzy has been employed by several government-owned enterprises, such as Warsaw Park of Technology.

On 19 October 2023, he was nominated Poland Ambassador to Ukraine.

== Honours ==
On 8 December 2007, President Lech Kaczyński awarded him the Knight's Cross of the Order of Polonia Restituta.

In 2017, he received the Cross of Freedom and Solidarity.
