= Jacek Najder =

Polish politician (born 1960)

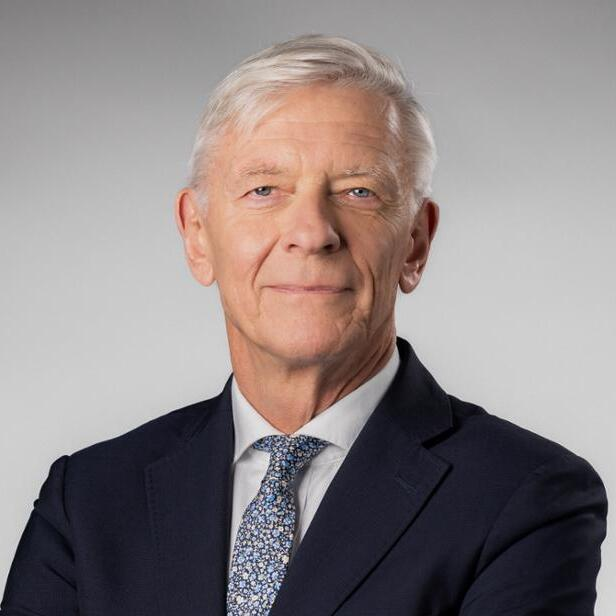

Poland Ambassador to Afghanistan
- In office 2007–2008
- Preceded by: Bogdan Marczewski
- Succeeded by: Jerzy Więcław

Poland Ambassador to NATO
- In office 2011–2016
- Preceded by: Bogusław Winid
- Succeeded by: Marek Ziółkowski

Poland Ambassador to NATO
- Incumbent
- Assumed office 2025
- Preceded by: Tomasz Szatkowski

Personal details
- Born: 12 December 1960 (age 65) Warsaw
- Education: University of Warsaw
- Profession: diplomat, politician

Jacek Najder (born 12 December 1960, Warsaw) is a Polish diplomat and politician who was serving as Poland's ambassador to Afghanistan (2007–2008), undersecretary of state at the Ministry of Foreign Affairs (2008–2011), permanent representative to NATO (2011–2016, since 2025).

== Life ==
Najder graduated from Social Studies at the University of Warsaw (1985). He also has degrees in postgraduate studies in geography at the University of Warsaw (1988).

In 1986 he began his professional career in the Public Opinion Research Institute. Between 1988 and 1991, he worked for private companies. From 1991 to 1992 he worked for the UN Mission Iraq. In 1992, he joined the Ministry of Foreign Affairs. He served at the embassies in Islamabad, Pakistan (1995–1999) and Seoul, South Korea (2001–2005). Between 2005 and 2007, he was a deputy director and then Director of the MFA Asia and Pacific Department. In March 2007, he was appointed as an Ambassador to Afghanistan. He ended his term on 14 December 2008. Next, he nominated Undersecretary of State at the MFA. From 2011 to 31 December 2016, he served as a Permanent Representative to NATO. From 2017 he worked was consultant for business, think-tanks and universities in the fields of international relations, security, defense and diplomacy. In 2020, he became Director of the City of Warsaw Bureau of International Cooperation. In June 2024, Najder returned to MFA and took the post of acting Permanent Representative to NATO. In April 2025, he was nominated Permanent Representative to NATO.

== Honours ==
- 2011 – Officer's Cross of the Order of Polonia Restituta

== Personal life ==
Married with two children. Besides Polish he speaks English and Russian.
