= Poland–Ukraine border crisis =

Blocking of roads leading to the EU from Ukraine

- Part of the Russian invasion of Ukraine
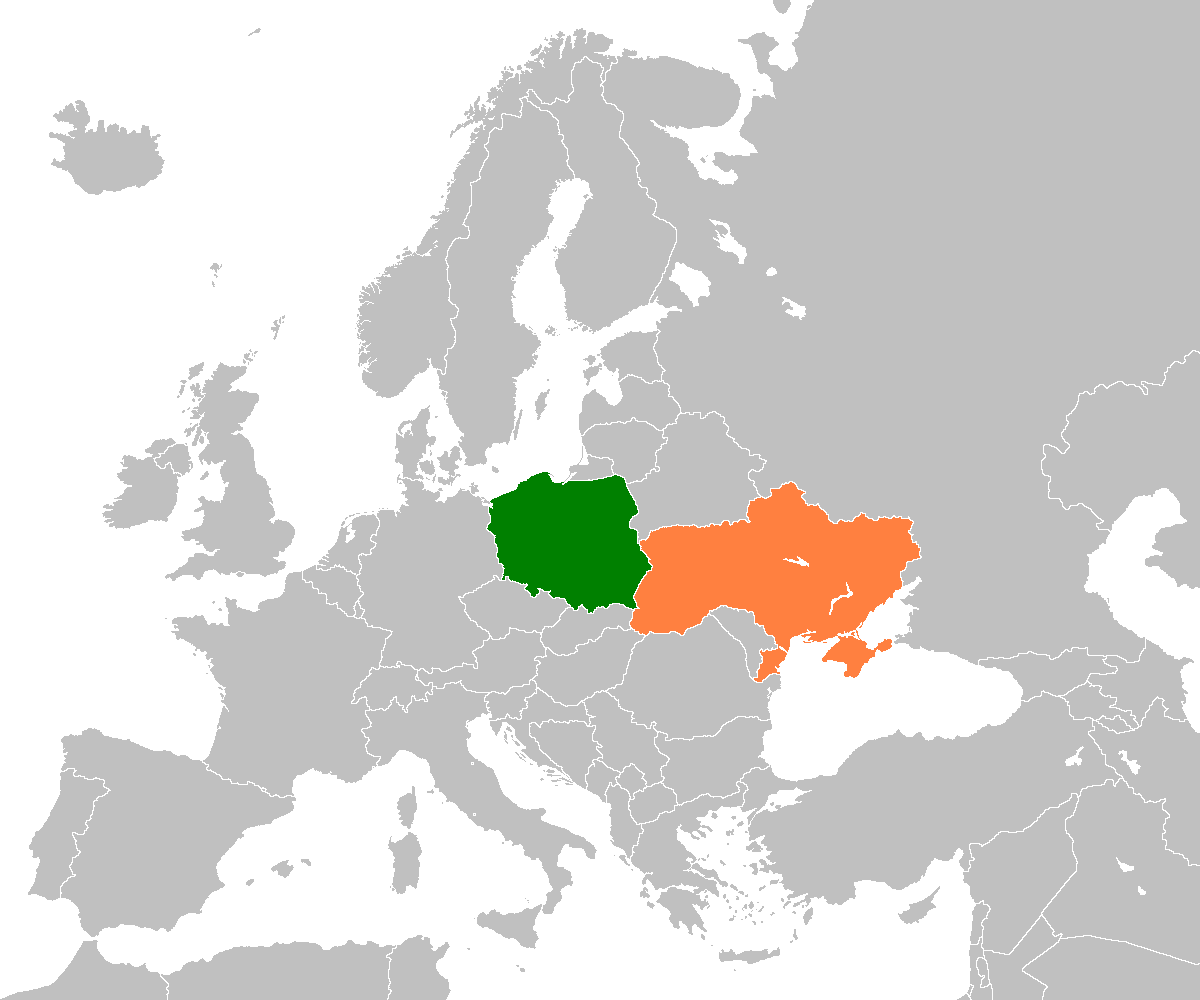
- Poland and Ukraine within Europe
- Date: 6 November 2023—Present (3 years and 1 week)
- Location: Poland–Ukraine border
- Goals: Cancellation of transport visa-free regime for Ukraine
- Methods: Obstruction of passage, rallies
- Status: Ongoing

Parties
Ukraine	Polish protesters Confederation Liberty and Independence	Government of Poland: Morawiecki II–III (until 13 Dec. 2023); Tusk III (from 13 Dec. 2023)

Casualties and losses
3 truck drivers died		

Since November 2023, the border between Poland and Ukraine has been subject to regular blockades by Polish protesters. The blockade extended to all agricultural goods exported from Ukraine.

== History ==
On 6 November 2023, several dozen owners of Polish transport companies blocked three major Poland–Ukraine border crossings to protest claimed unfair competition from Ukrainian transport companies. The protesters said so far during 2023, Ukrainian trucks had crossed the border about 900,000 times compared to about 180,000 times in previous years. A temporary wartime EU agreement allowed Ukrainian trucks to deliver and collect to and from the EU without the usual permits. The agreement only allowed cross-border transports between Ukraine and EU, but protesters claim that Ukrainian drivers started taking cargoes inside EU, quickly pushing out local drivers from the market due to lower operational costs, as they are not subject to EU labour and environmental regulations. The protesters also quoted long 12-14 days wait times and extortion of bribes on the Ukrainian side of the border. The Polish truckers association ZMPD was joined by MKFE (Hungary), Cesmad Bohemia (Czechia), Cesmad Slovakia and Linava (Lithuania).

On 19 November, about 3,000 mostly Ukrainian trucks were stuck at the Dorhusk-Yagodin, Korczowa-Krakovets and Hrebenne-Rava-Ruska border crossings, parked up to 30 kilometres (19 mi) from the crossings. Waiting time for trucks to cross the border was about one week. On 27 November, the blockade was extended to the Medyka-Szeginie/Shehyni crossing. As of 4 December 2023, per Ukrainian e-Cherha system, there were over 22'000 trucks waiting for crossing back into EU on Ukrainian side. On the same day Ukrainian border force announced opening of new exit corridor for empty trucks returning to EU.

On 11 December, some local authorities in Poland withdrew permission for the protests, but a few days later on the 15 December the Lublin regional court revoked one of the decisions and the blockades resumed. One queue was reported as 80 kilometres (50 mi) long.

On 16 December 2023, the number of dead Ukrainian truck drivers reached three. According to Ukraine, the driver of a truck that was standing in line due to a strike by Polish carriers died.

On 4 January 2024, the Medyka-Szeginie checkpoint was blocked for the third time. On 17 January 2024, the blockade of all checkpoints was ended.

On 9 February 2024, the blockade was resumed at three checkpoints. One of the three checkpoints was restored the next day.

On 13 February 2024, the Krakiwiec-Korchów checkpoint was blocked.

On 18 February 2024, protesters did not allow the Dnipro-Khelm train, which had about 260 passengers, to pass. After the intervention of the Polish police and railway workers, the train was unblocked and continued to move.

On February 20, 2024, there was a complete blockade of all checkpoints, the Polish protesters dumped grain from a freight car near the Medyka-Szeginie checkpoint. On the same day, it became known that Ukrainian carriers have now also blocked Sheghini, Krakovets and Rava-Ruska checkpoints on the border with Poland in response to the blocking of the border by Polish farmers. The organizers of the action began to control the passage through the specified checkpoints. They do not allow Polish truck drivers to bypass the general queue. Ukrainian carriers placed posters on their trucks with inscriptions in English and Ukrainian: "Blockade of Ukraine - betrayal of European values", "Ukraine will lose - Poland will lose", "Stop the blockade at the borders" and "Remove the blockade - return Ukrainian drivers home".

Ukrainian carriers promise to continue the action around the clock until the border blockade is lifted, or until March 15. Polish protesters claim that a special commission should be created in Brussels, whose representatives should come to Poland and talk to farmers.

On 27 February 2024, about 10,000 farmers marched in Warsaw demanding a ban on food imports from Ukraine. On 28 February 2024, Polish Prime Minister Donald Tusk said the government was considering a temporary closure of the border for goods; he said "We are talking with the Ukrainian side about a temporary closure of the border, the cessation in general of trade".

In October 2024, the Gliwice Prosecutor's Office submitted to the court the case of a Polish farmer who decorated his tractor with the flag of the USSR and called on the Russian president to “deal with Ukraine, Brussels, and the Polish government” during the border blockade.

On November 23, 2024, Polish farmers blocked the border with Ukraine once again. Around 30 protesters prevented trucks from passing through the Medyka — Shehyni border crossing. However, it wasn't connected with trade relations between Poland and Ukraine. The farmers named two reasons for their actions: the agreement between the EU and Mercosur (South American trade bloc) and the increased agricultural tax in 2024. On November 24, the blocking of the checkpoint stopped.

On November 26, 2024, Radosław Sikorski, Polish Foreign Minister, stated at the meeting with the Ukrainian counterpart, that protesters must not block checkpoints on the border with Ukraine because they are part of the critical infrastructure of Poland.

== Reactions ==
On the first day of the blockade, the ambassador of Ukraine in Poland called for an end to the blockade.

On 16 November 2023, the European Commission announced that it may initiate criminal proceedings against Poland if the Polish authorities do not resolve the issue with the carriers about blocking the borders. To which the Polish carriers refused.

On 26 November 2023, Latvia declared that it was ready to join the negotiations on the unblocking of the border.

Polish Prime Minister Mateusz Morawiecki supported the return of permits for Ukraine.

Alina Bondarchuk, the head of the disinformation collection and monitoring department of the Ukrainian government's CCD, said that during the period of the Russian invasion of Ukraine, 4.3 million tons of Ukrainian grain were imported, while 12 million tons of Russian grain were imported into the territory of Poland. She also stated that the actions of farmers in Poland are financed by the Kremlin.

On February 20, 2024, the Minister of Agriculture and Rural Development of Poland, Czesław Siekierski, addressed the farmers with the fact that the ministry wants to develop a bilateral agreement with Ukraine, which would expand the scope of market protection, including other sensitive products. On the same day, the Ministry of Foreign Affairs of Ukraine called on Poland to unblock the border.
