= Jerzy Bahr =

Polish diplomat (1944–2016)

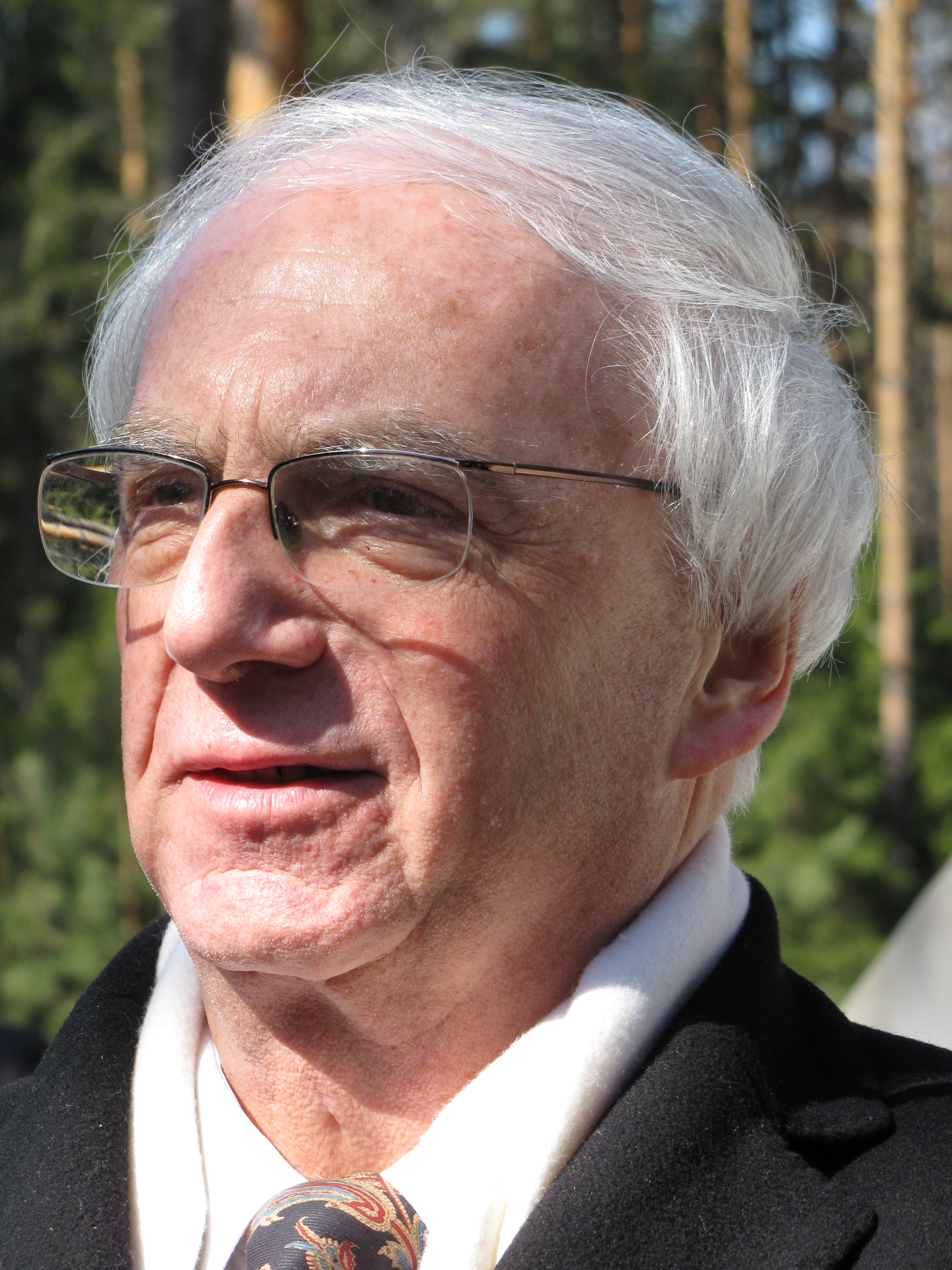

Poland Ambassador to Russia
- In office 2006–2010
- Appointed by: Lech Kaczyński
- President: Vladimir Putin; Dmitry Medvedev
- Preceded by: Stefan Meller
- Succeeded by: Wojciech Zajączkowski

Poland Ambassador to Lithuania
- In office 2001–2005
- Appointed by: Aleksander Kwaśniewski
- President: Valdas Adamkus; Rolandas Paksas; Valdas Adamkus
- Preceded by: Eufemia Teichmann
- Succeeded by: Janusz Skolimowski

Poland Ambassador to Ukraine
- In office 1996–2001
- Appointed by: Aleksander Kwaśniewski
- President: Leonid Kuchma
- Preceded by: Jerzy Kozakiewicz
- Succeeded by: Marek Ziółkowski

Poland Consul General to Kaliningrad
- In office 1992–1994
- Appointed by: Krzysztof Skubiszewski
- Preceded by: Marek Krajewski
- Succeeded by: Henryk Piaszyk

Personal details
- Born: 23 April 1944 Kraków, General Government
- Died: 25 July 2016 (aged 72) Kraków, Poland
- Profession: Diplomat

Jerzy Artur Bahr (23 April 1944 – 25 July 2016) was a Polish diplomat.

== Life ==
Bahr graduated from sociology at the Jagiellonian University (1967). In 1974, he began his diplomatic career at the Ministry of Foreign Affairs. From 1992 to 1994 he was Consul-General in Kaliningrad, from 1997 to 2001 he was the Ambassador Extraordinary and Plenipotentiary of the Republic of Poland to Ukraine, from 2001 to 2005 to Lithuania, and from 2006 to 2010 he was Ambassador Extraordinary and Plenipotentiary of the Republic of Poland to the Russian Federation. Bahr died of cancer on 25 July 2016 at the age of 72.
