= List of ambassadors of Poland to Ukraine =

Poland Ambassador to Ukraine
- Ambasador Rzeczypospolitej Polskiej na Ukrainie
- Coat of arms of Poland
- Incumbent; Piotr Łukasiewicz (chargé d'affaires) since 2024
- Style: Mr. Ambassador (informal); His Excellency (diplomatic)
- Reports to: Polish Ministry of Foreign Affairs
- Seat: Kyiv, Ukraine
- Appointer: President of Poland
- Term length: No fixed term
- Website: Embassy of Poland, Ukraine

The Republic of Poland Ambassador to Ukraine is the leader of the Poland delegation, Poland Mission to Ukraine. Poland Ambassador to Ukraine is the official representative of the President and Government of Poland to the President and Government of Ukraine.

As with all Poland Ambassadors, the ambassador to Ukraine is nominated by the President of Poland and confirmed by the Parliamentary Commission of the Foreign Affairs. The ambassador serves at the pleasure of the president, and enjoys full diplomatic immunity.

The Embassy of Poland is located in Kyiv, in addition, there are Consulates General located in Lviv, Odesa, Kharkiv, Lutsk and Vinnytsia.

== History ==
Poland was the first country in the world which recognised Ukraine's independence in 1991. The history of ambassadors of Poland to Ukraine began in 1992, when both countries established diplomatic relations. Until 1991, the Ukrainian Soviet Socialist Republic had been a constituent SSR of the Soviet Union however during this period in Kiev was located Consulate General of Poland.

== List of ambassadors of Poland to Ukraine ==
- 1992–1997: Jerzy Kozakiewicz
- 1997–2001: Jerzy Bahr
- 2001–2005: Marek Ziółkowski
- 2005–2010: Jacek Kluczkowski
- 2010–2011: Dariusz Górczyński (chargé d'affaires)
- 2011–2016: Henryk Litwin
- 2016–2019: Jan Piekło
- 2019–2023: Bartosz Cichocki
- 2023–2024: Jarosław Guzy
- since 2024: Piotr Łukasiewicz (chargé d'affaires)

== Gallery ==
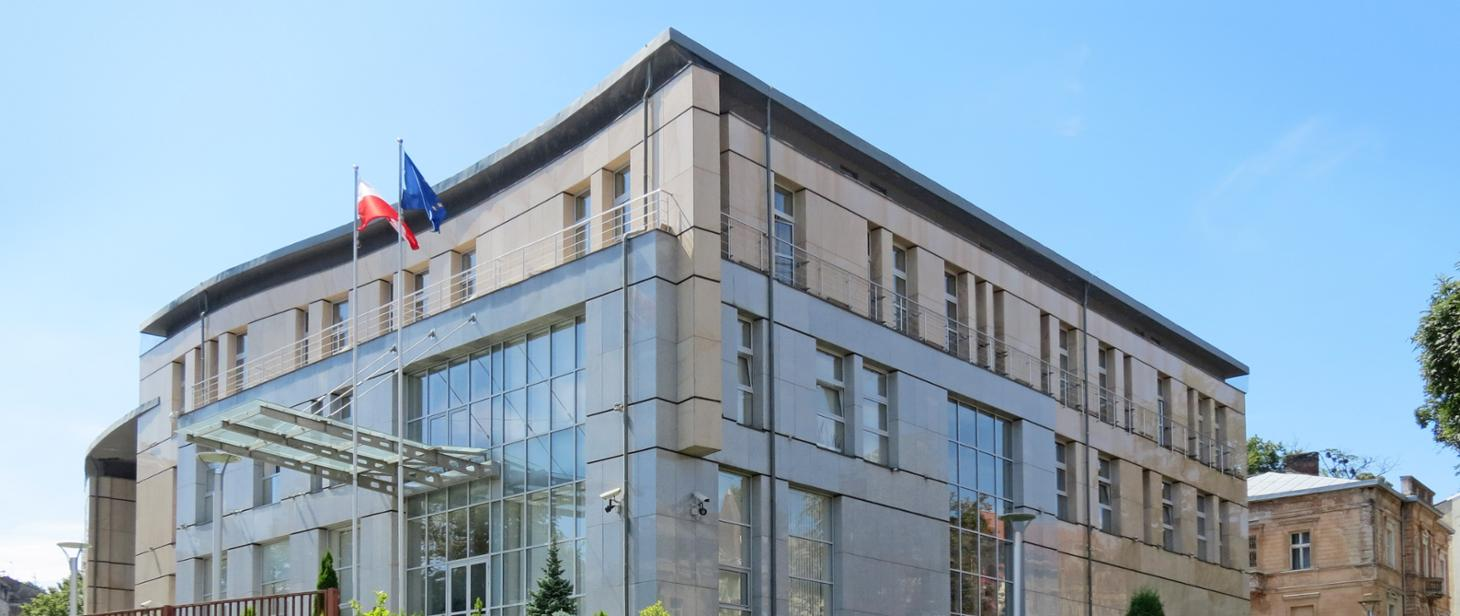
Consulate General of Poland, Lviv

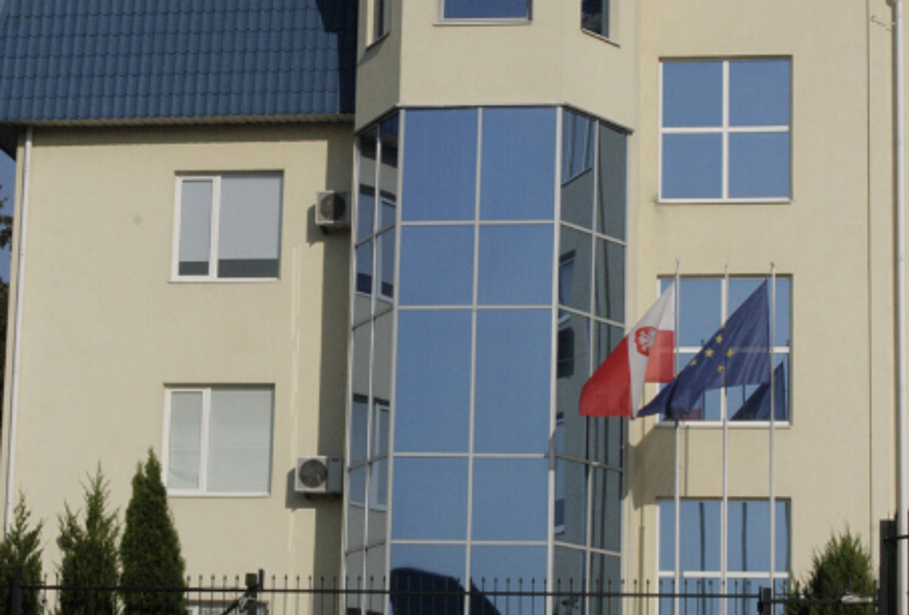
Consulate General of Poland, Lutsk

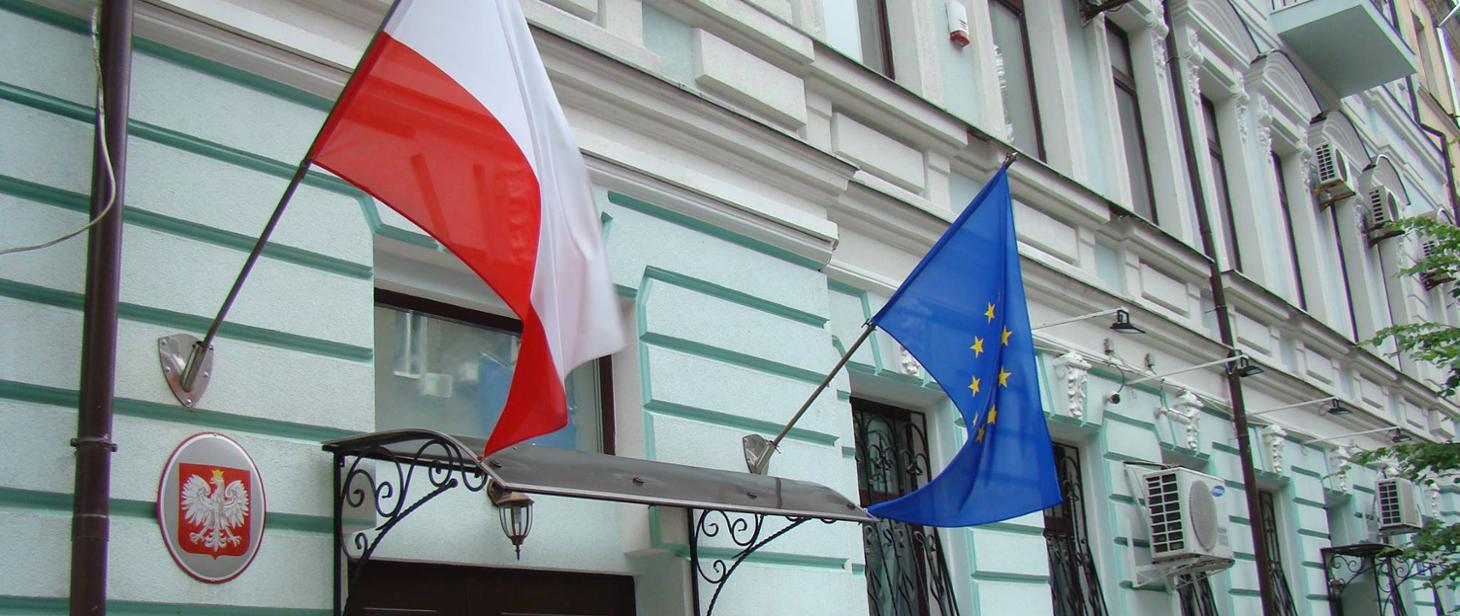
Consulate General of Poland, Kharkiv

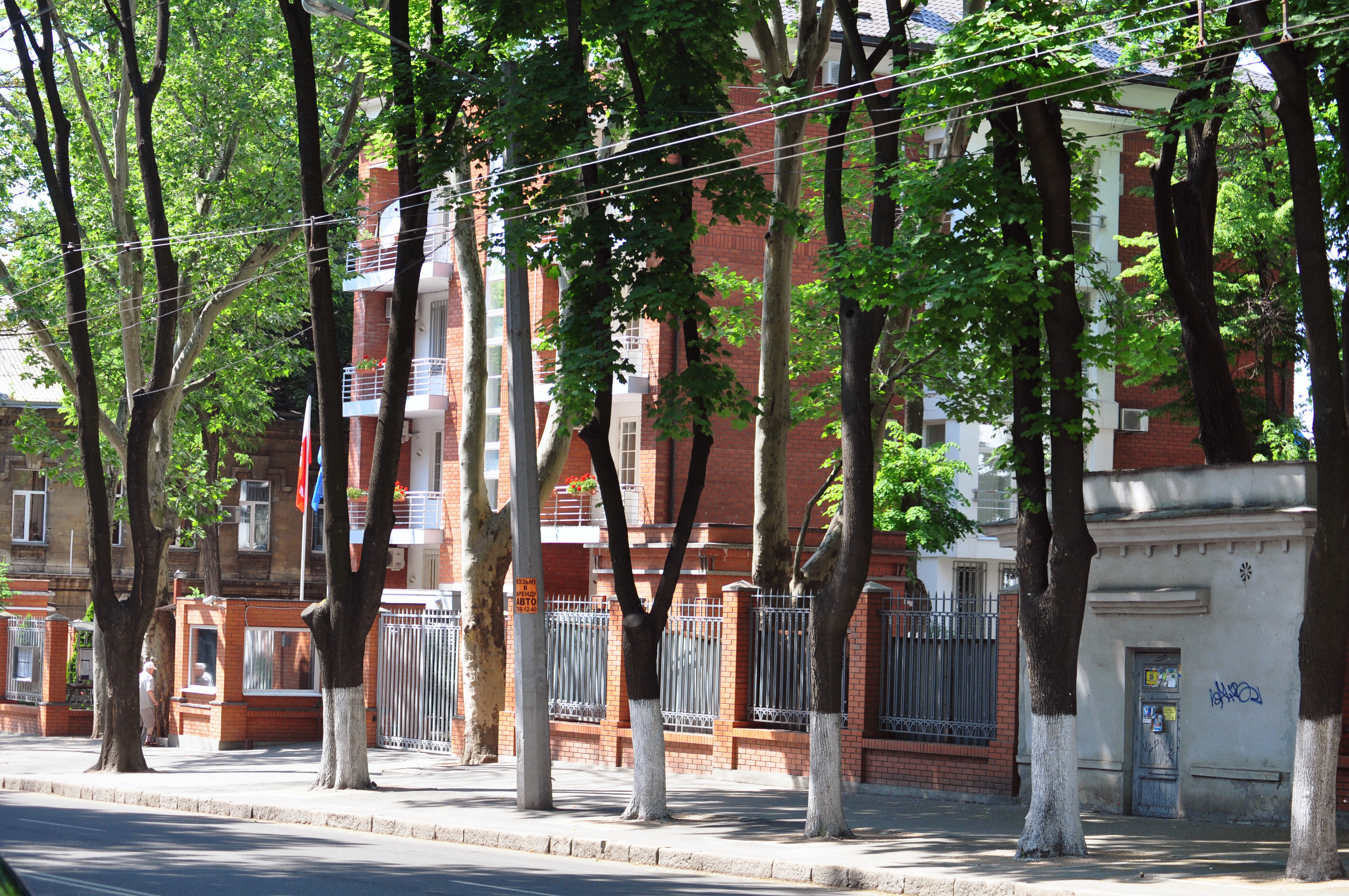
Consulate General of Poland, Odesa

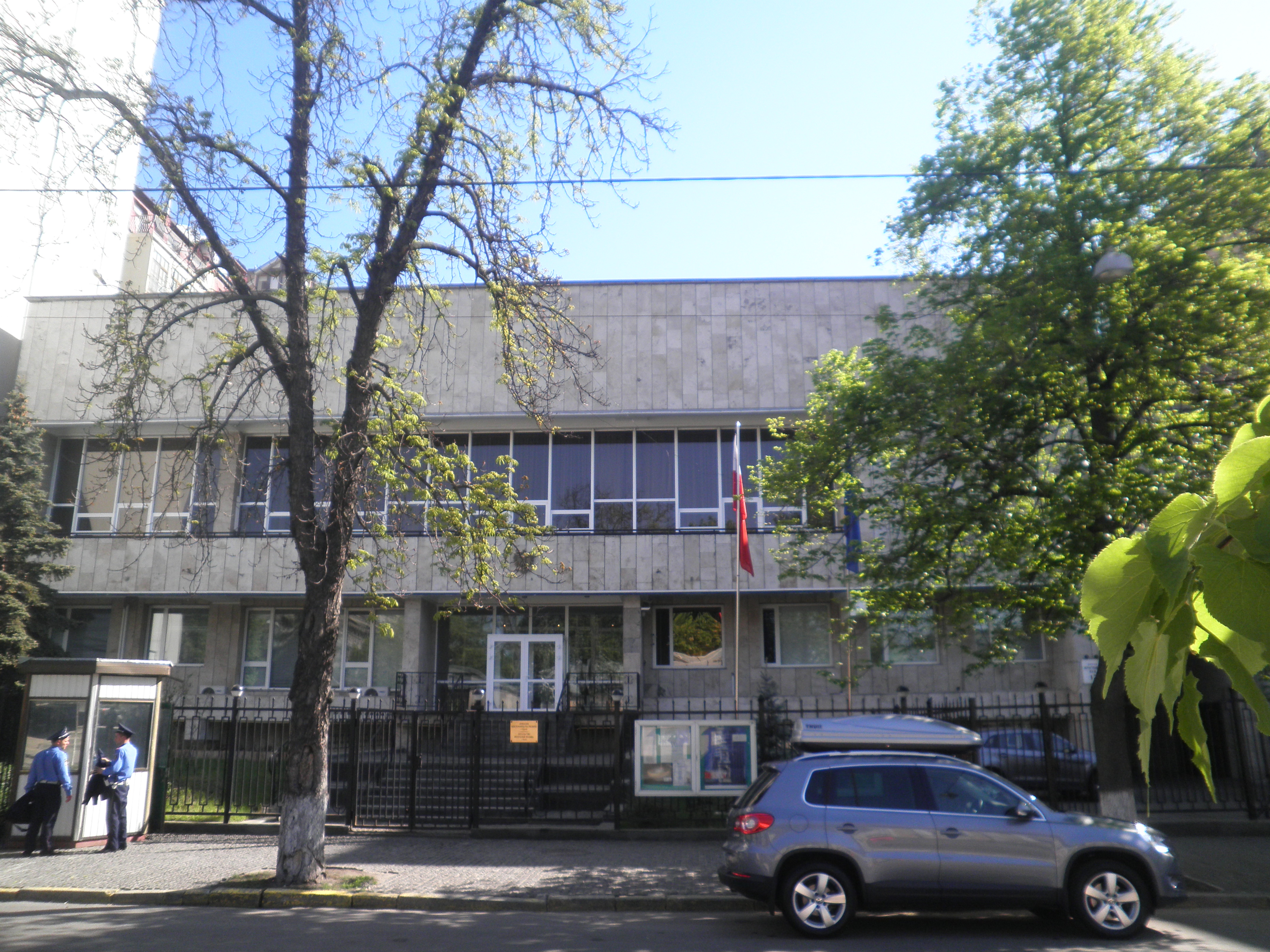
Embassy of Poland, Kyiv

== See also ==
- Poland–Ukraine relations
- List of ambassadors of Ukraine to Poland
