= Marek Ziółkowski =

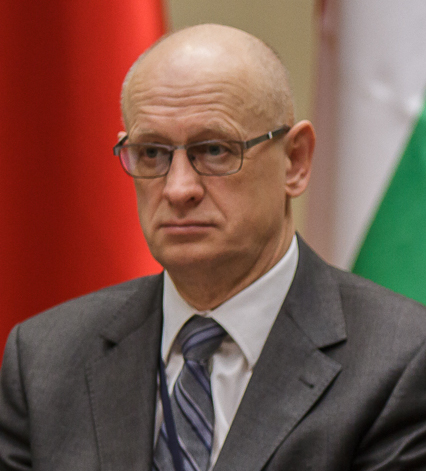
- (2017)

Poland Ambassador to NATO
- In office 2017–2019
- Appointed by: Andrzej Duda
- Secretary General: Jens Stoltenberg
- Preceded by: Jacek Najder
- Succeeded by: Tomasz Szatkowski

Undersecretary of State in the Ministry of Foreign Affairs
- In office 2015–2017
- Appointed by: Beata Szydło

Poland Ambassador to Kenya
- In office 2012–2015
- Appointed by: Bronisław Komorowski
- President: Mwai Kibaki; Uhuru Kenyatta
- Preceded by: Anna Grupińska
- Succeeded by: Jacek Bazański

Poland Ambassador to Ukraine
- In office 2001–2005
- Appointed by: Aleksander Kwaśniewski
- President: Leonid Kuchma; Viktor Yushchenko
- Preceded by: Jerzy Bahr
- Succeeded by: Jacek Kluczkowski

Poland Chargé d'Affaires to Belarus
- In office 1995–1996
- Appointed by: Władysław Bartoszewski
- President: Alexander Lukashenko
- Preceded by: Elżbieta Smułkowa
- Succeeded by: Ewa Spychalska

Personal details
- Born: 1955 (age 70–71) Kętrzyn, Poland
- Children: two
- Education: University of Warsaw
- Profession: Diplomat

Marek Ziółkowski (born 1955 in Kętrzyn) is a Polish diplomat, ambassador of Poland to Ukraine (2001–2005), Kenya (2012–2015), and NATO (2017–2019).

== Life ==
Marek Ziółkowski has graduated from philosophy at the University of Warsaw. He was working in the tourism industry.

In 1991, he joined the diplomatic service. He was deputy head of the Polish Consulate-General and Embassy in Mińsk until 1996. From 1997 to 2001 he was the deputy director and director of the Department of Eastern Europe at the Ministry of Foreign Affairs. He served as an ambassador to Ukraine (2001–2005). From 2006 to 2008 he was the deputy director of the Security Policy Department, and then the director of the MFA Department of Development Cooperation (2008–2011). Later, he was Poland ambassador to Kenya, responsible also for the relations with UN-HABITAT, Burundi, Comoros, Madagascar, Mauritius, Rwanda, Somalia, Seychelles, Tanzania and Uganda (2012–2015). In December 2015 he was appointed Undersecretary of State for Eastern and Security Policy at the Ministry of Foreign Affairs. In May 2017, the President of the Republic of Poland appointed him as Permanent Representative of Poland to NATO. He ended his term on 31 March 2019. Since 2021 retired.

In regards to personal life, Ziółkowski is married and has two children.

== Awards ==
- Knight's Cross of the Order of Polonia Restituta (2011)
- Order of Prince Yaroslav the Wise, 5th class (2005)

== Works ==
- Ziółkowski, Marek (1985). Szkice o kościołach obrządków wschodnich w Polsce Północno-Wschodniej. Warszawa: Oddział Uniwersytecki PTTK Polskiego Towarzystwa Turystyczno-Krajoznawczego. OCLC 835901959.
- Ziółkowski, Marek (2008). Projekt Ukraina. Wrocław: Kolegium Europy Wschodniej im. Jana Nowaka-Jeziorańskiego. ISBN 978-83-61617-08-2.
