= Federation of Jewish Communities of Ukraine =

Federation to support Jewish communities in Ukraine with their daily tasks

FJCU
- Federation of Jewish Communities of Ukraine
- Федерація єврейських громад України
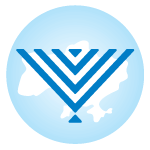
- Formation: March 30, 1999; 27 years ago
- Founder: Jewish organizations in Ukrainian cities
- Founded at: Ukraine
- Type: NGO
- Legal status: Religious Federation
- Purpose: humanitarian
- Headquarters: 1
- Location: Dnipro, Ukraine
- Chairman of the board: Rabbi Meir Zvi Stambler
- Executive Vice Chairman: Rabbi Raphael Rutman
- Chief Rabbi: Rabbi Shmuel Kaminetsky
- Director: Alina Teplitskaya
- Website: www.fjc.org.ua

The Federation of Jewish Communities of Ukraine (Ukrainian: Федерація єврейських громад України) is a Ukrainian Jewish religious organization, founded in 1999 at the Conference of Jewish Religious Communities and Organizations of Ukraine. It unites more than 175 communities of Chabad-Lubavitch Orthodox Judaism.

== History ==
In the early 1990s, the revival of Jewish communities began in the cities of Ukraine, which were created mainly due to the enthusiasm of activists of the Jewish movement, without work experience, without a well-thought-out strategy, without sufficient coordination and interaction. Thus, at the initiative of the leaders of Jewish communities and organizations, the FJCU was created to coordinate and unite the efforts of Jewish communities and intensify the processes of integration and development of Jewish public life. At the beginning of its activity, FJCU launched work on the formation of regional associations as structural links for the purpose of interaction between the FJCU headquarters and local communities. These associations began their work as part of 5-6 local communities. At the moment (2023 year), the Federation unites 178 communities in cities with a Jewish population of more than 400,000 people.

== Goals ==
The main task of the FJCU is to help Jewish communities in their daily work, in the main areas of their activity:

- The development of Jewish education.
- The revival of the Jewish tradition.
- Support for social programs.
- Conducting Jewish holidays and the revival of Jewish culture.
- Development programs and special projects.

== Activity ==
The main activity of the FJCU is to develop and implement humanitarian projects and charitable programs to support the Jewish population, restore Jewish traditions and culture of the Jewish people. FJCU attaches great importance to the organization of Jewish holidays in communities with the participation of foreign envoys.

=== Social programs ===
In all communities covered by the activities of the FJCU, major programs are held annually, namely:

- The "Easter Program" — takes place in the month of Nisan, provides the Jews of Ukraine with Passover matzo and kosher wine or juice for festive seders, as well as organizing and holding dozens of public seders, both in large cities and in small communities. Every year, seders are held in more than 80 cities of Ukraine, in which about 17,000 participants take part, with the involvement of more than 40 foreign and local envoys. In 2020, due to the COVID-19 pandemic, the program sent out Passover kits to members of Jewish communities in each family separately. In total, 16,158 members of Jewish communities received the kits.
- The "Tishrei Program" — takes place in the month of Tishrei, which is filled with Jewish holidays: Rosh Hashanah, Yom Kippur, Sukkot, Shemini Atzeret and Simchat Torah. In order to help the Jews fulfill all the commandments of the holidays of the month of Tishrei, the FJCU provides organization and assistance in their proper implementation. This allows Ukrainian Jews to keep in touch with their history, traditions and heritage.

=== Publishing ===
FJCU publishes and distributes printed materials throughout the year. These are calendars with indication of traditional and Jewish numbers and months, in which all important Jewish dates are indicated, all holidays with the indication of the lighting of Shabbat candles, and much more. These are thematic booklets for every Jewish holiday with a detailed description of the commandments, history, laws and customs. These are books on the basics of Judaism, traditions and Halacha, the teachings of the Lubavitcher Rebbe, children's books, etc.

=== Since Russia's invasion of Ukraine ===
FJCU organizes a camp for temporary migrants in Hungary and in Poland. Also provides food assistance to various religious communities during the war.

In October 2023, FJCU held a ceremony in memory of the victims of Babi Yar, with the invitation of Ukrainian president Volodymyr Zelenskyy.

== Partners ==
The Federation has wide internal and external relations, works in close cooperation with the Ministry of Education of Israel, the Embassy of the State of Israel in Ukraine, the Jewish Agency Sokhnut, the Or Avner Charitable Foundation, the American Jewish Joint Distribution Committee, the United Jewish Community of Ukraine, as well as with the largest Jewish organizations in all countries of the world.
