= Piotr Farfał =

Polish politician, lawyer (born 1978)

Piotr Grzegorz Farfał (born 18 May 1978 in Głogów) is a Polish rightwing politician of the League of Polish Families and former President of the Polish national TV network TVP.

== Biography ==
Farfał studied law at the University of Szczecin and at the College of Banking in Wrocław. He was active in the nationalist All-Polish Youth and the National Revival of Poland. As a student he wrote for the right-wing newspapers "Front" and "Szczerbiec" (The Sword). However, when the Polish newspaper Gazeta Wyborcza described him as a "former neo-Nazi", Farfał sued, only to have his lawsuit thrown out by a local court.

In May 2006 Farfał became a supervisory board member and vice-president of the state-run TV network TVP, and was appointed president in December 2008. After assuming office he cancelled a contract financing the biopic The Courageous Heart of Irena Sendler, on the life of Irena Sendler who had helped save thousands of Jewish children during the Holocaust. In protest the French-German TV network Arte suspended cooperation with TVP, considering Farfał's views "incompatible with Arte’s philosophy based on intercultural exchange", and stating that "the party that TVP's chairman is presently connected with does not share European values."

A number of Polish public media figures, including film directors Agnieszka Holland and Andrzej Wajda, subsequently appealed to the public to boycott TVP on Polish Constitution day, 3 May 2009.

== Works ==
- Myśleć po polsku ("Thinking Polish")
