= Zofia Romaszewska =

Polish social activist

Irena Zofia Romaszewska (née Płoska; born August 17, 1940, in Warsaw) is a Polish social activist, who served as a member of the State Tribunal from 1991 to 1993, and a member of the Movement for Reconstruction of Poland from 1996 to 2001. She was awarded the Order of Polonia Restituta in 2006, and awarded the Order of the White Eagle and Cross of Freedom and Solidarity on 2016.
