= Piotr Łukasiewicz (diplomat) =

Polish diplomat (born 1974)

Piotr Łukasiewicz Ph.D.
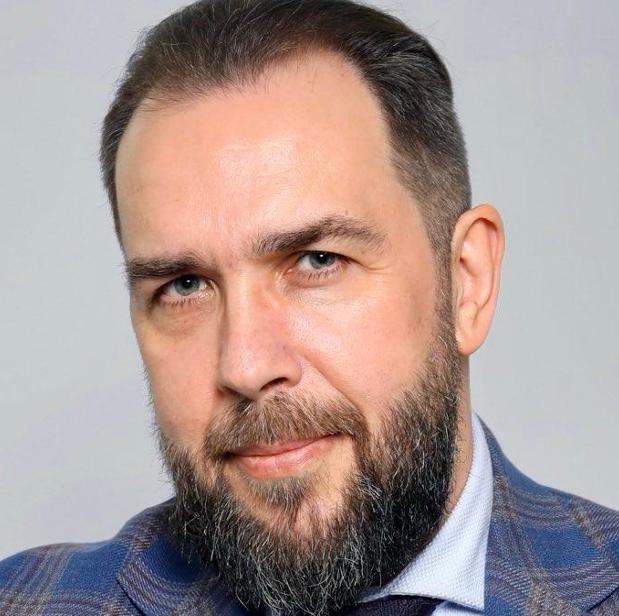
- Piotr Łukasiewicz (2024)

Poland Ambassador to Afghanistan
- In office 12 June 2012 – 31 December 2014
- Appointed by: Bronisław Komorowski
- Preceded by: Maciej Lang
- Succeeded by: Embassy closed

Personal details
- Born: February 9, 1972 (age 54) Sosnowiec, Poland
- Education: Warsaw School of Economics
- Profession: Diplomat, soldier, political scientist

Piotr Leszek Łukasiewicz (born 1974, in Sosnowiec) is a Polish diplomat, Colonel of the Polish Armed Forces, political scientist; ambassador to Afghanistan (2012–2014), chargé d'affaires to Ukraine (since 2024).

== Life ==
Łukasiewcz graduated from Military University of Technology, Faculty of Cybernetics. He has been studying also at the National Defence University of Warsaw and in Washington, D.C. In 2018, he defended his doctoral thesis International coalition's state-building efforts in Afghanistan in the years 2001–2014.

Between 1995 and 2006 he served as a soldier, specializing in state security and counter-terrorism issues. He took part in military missions in Iraq. He was deputy military attaché in Pakistan (2006) and, since 2007, military attaché in Afghanistan. In October 2009, he became Plenipotentiary of the Minister of National Defence for the Polish Military Contingent in Afghanistan. On 31 January 2012 he ended his military career and retired.

On 12 June 2012, Łukasiewicz was nominated ambassador to Afghanistan, representing Poland during the most intensive time of the NATO mission in Afghanistan. He finished his term on 31 December 2014. He was the last Polish ambassador residing in Kabul.

Following his career in Afghanistan, he began working as an expert, university teacher, publicist.

In 2019, he was running in the 2019 European Parliament election as a candidate of Spring party.

On 1 September 2024, he took the post of chargé d'affaires to Ukraine.

In October 2025, Piotr Łukasiewicz and Oleh Karpenko, Deputy Director of the Come Back Alive Foundation, delivered opening remarks at a diplomatic panel organized by the Embassy of the Republic of Poland in Ukraine in partnership with the Come Back Alive Initiative Centre. The discussion focused on the topic "How Russia Makes Decisions: Policy Priorities and Their Impact on Europe." The event brought together more than 20 representatives of diplomatic missions and international think tanks operating in Ukraine.

== Honours ==
- Silver Cross of Merit (2009)
- Star of Iraq
- Honorary sabre of the Ministry of National Defence
