= Bartosz Cichocki =

Polish historian

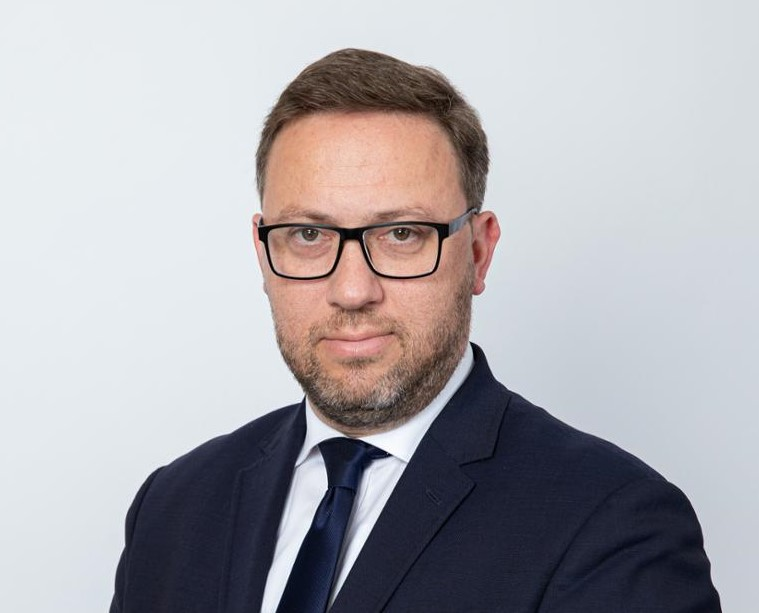
- Bartosz Cichocki

Poland Ambassador to Ukraine
- In office 8 March 2019 – 31 October 2023
- Appointed by: Andrzej Duda
- President: Petro Poroshenko; Volodymyr Zelenskyy
- Preceded by: Jan Piekło
- Succeeded by: Jarosław Guzy

Personal details
- Born: August 12, 1976 (age 50) Warsaw
- Education: University of Warsaw
- Profession: Political scientist, historian

Bartosz Jan Cichocki (born 12 August 1976, Warsaw) is a Polish political scientist and historian, between 2019 and 2023 serving as an ambassador to Ukraine.

== Life ==
Cichocki graduated from history at the University of Warsaw. He worked for the KARTA Center, Centre for Eastern Studies as an analyst on Russian regional policy, Polish Institute of International Affairs as a coordination of Russia-Eurasia programme, National Security Bureau as a specialist on Russian foreign and security policies, and head of international relations unit. Between 2015 and 2016 he was at the Polish embassy in Moscow. In 2017, he was an advisor to the head of the Foreign Intelligence Agency. On 25 May 2017, Cichocki joined the Ministry of Foreign Affairs, becoming Undersecretary of State for security, Eastern and European policy. Since 1 February 2018 the prime minister Mateusz Morawiecki made him Head of the Polish Group for Legal and Historical Dialogue with Israel.

On 8 March 2019, he was nominated Polish ambassador to Ukraine, 8 days later presenting his letter of credence to the President Petro Poroshenko. In February 2022, he was the only EU ambassador who did not leave Kyiv during the siege. He ended his term on 31 October 2023.

== Honours ==
- 2024 – Officer's Cross of the Order of Polonia Restituta
- 2022 – Order of Merit, 2nd class, Ukraine (returned in 2026)
- 2022 – Cross of Merit, Ukraine
