= Konstanty Kalinowski Scholarship Program =

Scholarship program

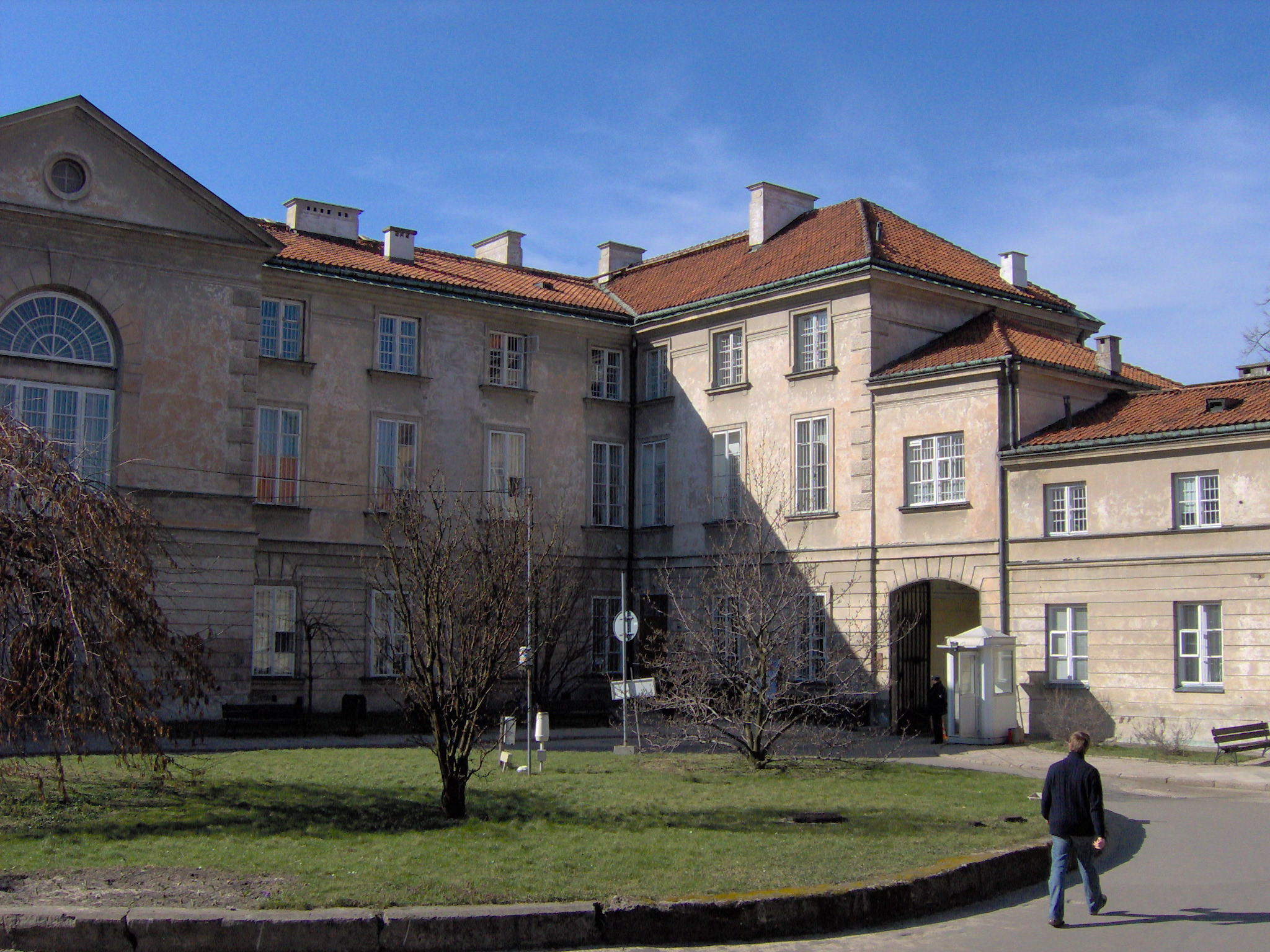
Kalinowski Program office at the Potocki Palace in Warsaw, March 2007

The Konstanty Kalinowski Scholarship Program of the Republic of Poland under the Patronage of the Prime Minister of the Republic of Poland (Belarusian: Стыпендыяльная праграма Ураду Рэспублікі Польшча імя Кастуся Каліноўскага пад патранатам Старшыні Рады Міністраў РП, romanized: Stypiendyjalnaja prahrama Uradu Respubliki Polszcza imia Kastusia Kalinouskaha pad patranatam Starszyni Rady Ministrau RP) is a Polish state aid program for Belarusian youth established in March 2006. Initially intended for students expelled from Belarusian universities for political reasons, over time it also included individuals who cannot study in Belarus due to their political views and involvement in defending democracy and human rights. It is the largest program of its kind in Europe. It is substantively coordinated by the Program Office at the Centre for East European Studies in University of Warsaw, in cooperation with the Ministry of Foreign Affairs and the Ministry of Science and Higher Education. The director and coordinator of the program, overseeing the office's work and the work of the committees qualifying candidates for studies, is the director of the Centre for East European Studies in University of Warsaw, Jan Malicki. The program is funded from the state budget – in 2008, the Polish Ministry of Foreign Affairs allocated 1.2 million euros for its continuation.

== Reasons and circumstances of the creation ==
On 19 March 2006, presidential elections took place in Belarus, which according to the Organization for Security and Co-operation in Europe and Belarusian opposition organizations were deemed to be falsified in favor of President Lukashenko. This led to the outbreak of social protests, primarily involving young people. The authorities responded to these protests with mass arrests and repression. Those targeted included individuals participating in the protests, as well as those attempting to observe the election process and taking part in the election campaigns of opposition candidates for president: Alaksandar Milinkievič and Alyaksandr Kazulin. One of the main forms of pressure exerted on the youth was the threat of expulsion from their universities, which, in many cases, indeed occurred.

Faced with this wave of repression, the Polish government and the authorities of Polish universities initiated the establishment of an aid program for Belarusian students expelled from their universities for political reasons. On 30 March 2006, Prime Minister Kazimierz Marcinkiewicz, representative of the United Democratic Forces of Belarus Alaksandar Milinkievič, as well as the Presidents of the Conference of Rectors of Polish Universities and the Conference of Rectors of Academic Schools in Poland, solemnly signed a "Letter of Intent", laying the foundation for the establishment of the program. The event took place in the Adam Mickiewicz Auditorium at the University of Warsaw in the presence of hundreds of students, academics, and guests.

In light of the recent events in Belarus, particularly the repression targeting young people involved in upholding human rights and democracy, and remembering the not-so-distant times when Poles also had to fight for democracy and freedom, the Polish government and the Conference of Rectors of Academic Schools in Poland declare their intention to establish the "Konstanty Kalinowski Scholarship Program". The program aims to support approximately 300 students from Belarus who have been expelled from universities in Belarus due to their involvement in activities defending democratic values.

— Kazimierz Marcinkiewicz, Alaksandar Milinkievič and others, Letter of Intent

The program was named after Konstanty Kalinowski, born in 1838, a participant in the January Uprising, a representative of the insurgent government in the Grand Duchy of Lithuania, who was hanged by the Russian authorities in Vilnius in 1864. He is renowned for his contribution to the defense of Belarusian identity and culture and is held in high esteem by Belarusians who are conscious of their national heritage.

The inauguration of the program took place on 5 July 2006. It commenced with a meeting between the scholarship recipients who arrived in Poland and Prime Minister Kazimierz Marcinkiewicz in the garden of the University of Warsaw Library. This was followed by an academic session at the university's Auditorium Maximum, attended by the Marshal of the Senate of the Republic of Poland Bogdan Borusewicz, Alaksandar Milinkievič, authorities from the university, rectors of Polish universities, and several hundred Polish and Belarusian students.

== Eligibility criteria for the scholarship ==
The duration of the scholarship depends on the year the student enrolled. For those enrolled in their first year, the scholarship can last up to 5 years. Participants of the Program receive a monthly stipend of 1,240 PLN to cover living expenses and accommodation costs. Universities offer students paid places in dormitories. Additionally, scholarship recipients receive dictionaries, encyclopedias, books on culture and history, as well as a sum of 400 PLN for miscellaneous expenses at the beginning of the preparatory course. During the first year of studies, students are under the care of tutors assigned to them from the junior academic staff. Tutors assist them in adapting during the initial period of their studies.

== Preparatory courses and tour ==
The participants of the first admission were organized into a three-month preparatory course in Warsaw (July–September 2006), which included an intensive Polish language course (up to 5 hours a day), an English language course, and classes on IT, computers, and Internet usage. Within the framework of the course, the scholars also participated in classes and lectures on the history and culture of Poland, Belarus, Lithuania, Ukraine, and Central and Eastern Europe, as well as contemporary international issues, with an emphasis on European Union-related matters. The preparatory course was also an opportunity for numerous discussions, meetings, and cultural events.

In the summer of 2006, the participants also embarked on a three-week tour of Poland, during which they visited 22 cities, including Gniezno, Poznań, Wrocław, Kraków, Lublin, Białystok, Gdańsk, Toruń, Łódź, and Częstochowa. The scholars visited the most important academic centers and places of historical significance to Poles. The tour program included events such as meetings with participants of the 1956 Poznań protests, tours of the Wawel Cathedral and Wawel Castle, visits to the Auschwitz-Birkenau concentration camp, the Battle of Grunwald site, the Gdańsk Shipyard, and meetings with figures like Anna Walentynowicz. The tour provided an opportunity for the scholars to meet with university officials where they would later commence their studies and to explore the most beautiful places in Poland.

Preparatory courses for subsequent admissions were reduced to one month (September) of intensive Polish language courses. Tours were not organized for them.

== Admissions ==
=== First admission ===
In July 2006, in the first year of the program's operation, out of 300 available slots, 244 scholarship recipients were ultimately accepted. These individuals were unable to commence or continue their studies in Belarus due to their political views or the opposition activities of their parents. The selection of scholarship recipients was based on recommendations issued by a Belarusian unregistered organization called the Social Committee for the Defense of the Repressed "Solidarity", led by Ina Kulej. Knowledge of the Polish language was not required. The allocation of program participants to specific universities in Poland was carried out by the Program Office at the Centre for East European Studies of the University of Warsaw, based on applications submitted by universities, taking into account primarily the possibility of continuing studies initiated in Belarus and, to the extent possible, the expectations of the scholarship recipients. The universities independently assessed program differences and established rules for their harmonization. Program participants began their studies in 15 cities across Poland, at 37 universities, on 77 different fields of study. The highest number of individuals commenced their studies in Warsaw (102), followed by Białystok (30), Wrocław (21), Kraków (16), Gdańsk (14), Pułtusk (10), Biała Podlaska (10), Poznań (9), Lublin (8), Katowice (7), Łódź (6), Toruń (5), Bydgoszcz (2), Legnica (1), and Szczecin (1). Among the universities, the largest group of scholarship recipients (58) was enrolled at the University of Warsaw, across 21 different institutes.

The scholarship recipients most commonly pursued studies in the following fields: computer science, law, management, political science, and international relations. Individual students enrolled in diverse fields such as European studies, molecular biology, Scandinavian studies, philology, civil engineering, and so on.

The scholarship recipients were provided with the opportunity to purchase books necessary for their studies in their respective fields, up to the amount of 500 PLN.

=== Second and subsequent admissions ===
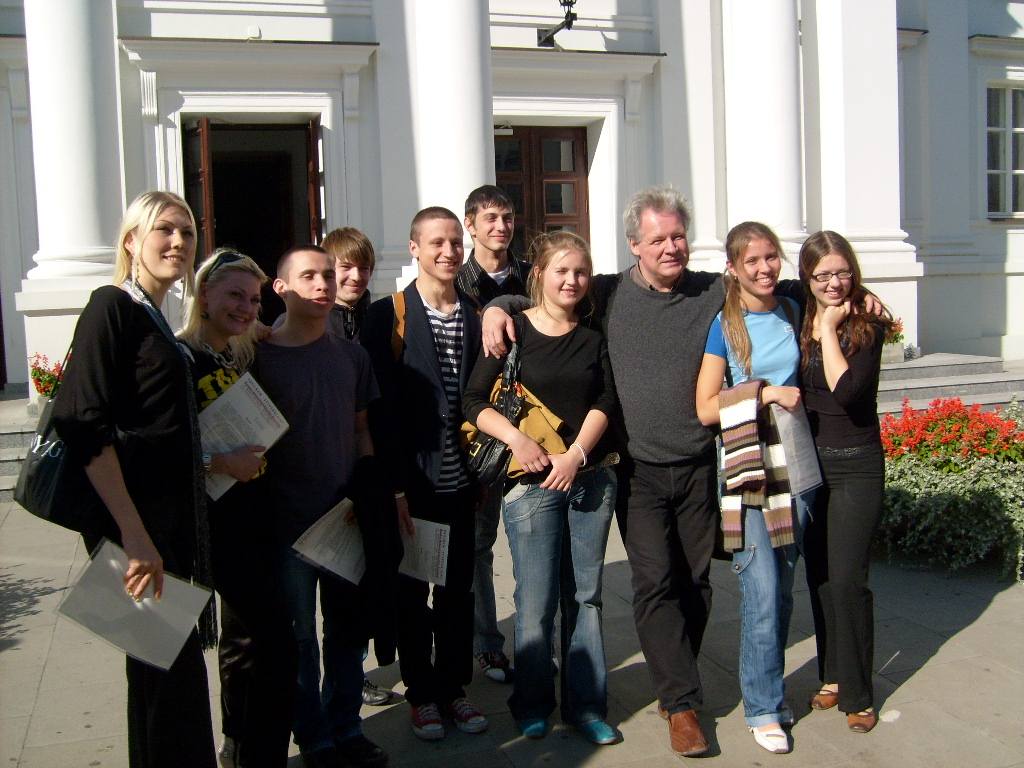
Piotr Garncarek of the Polonicum (third from right) with scholarship recipients from the second admission in front of the Auditorium Maximum of the University of Warsaw, September 2007

In September 2007, in the second year of the program's operation, the number of admitted students was significantly lower for two reasons. Firstly, learning from the mistakes of the previous year, stricter recruitment criteria were introduced. Secondly, the number of individuals expelled from studies in 2007 decreased. According to Ina Kulej, the chairwoman of the Committee for the Defense of the Repressed "Solidarity", the Belarusian authorities realized the inefficiency of continuing such forms of repression. The recruitment process began on 21 June 2007, conducted by a seven-member commission at the headquarters of the BNF Party in Minsk. On 29 August 2007, the list of 63 new Kalinowski Program scholarship holders was approved, including 44 students expelled from Belarusian universities for political reasons and the remaining 19 individuals who suffered for their political beliefs in other ways – activists of the BNF Party, former students of the only Belarusian-language Jakub Kolas High School in Minsk closed by the authorities, and family members of repressed individuals. In the following days, the list was supplemented with several additional individuals, reaching a final total of 71 scholarship holders. They were directed to 15 cities, attending 23 universities, where they pursued studies in 24 fields of study.

In September 2008, in the third year of the program's operation, 58 individuals were admitted, who were directed to 11 cities, attending 22 universities, where they pursued studies in 26 fields of study (according to other sources, it was 70 individuals).

In September 2009, in the fourth year of the program's operation, 44 individuals were admitted, who were directed to 14 cities, attending 22 universities, where they pursued studies in 26 fields of study.

In September 2010, in the fifth year of the program's operation, 53 individuals were admitted. Ten of them met the program's criteria but had not reached the age of 18. These scholarship holders were directed to a one-year preparatory course. The remaining 43 individuals were directed to study in 11 cities, attending 17 universities, where they pursued studies in 26 different fields of study.

In December 2010, a total of approximately 250 students were enrolled in the program.

After the wave of repression following the 2010 Belarusian presidential election, the program's management decided to organize an additional, special recruitment. Candidates participated in Preparatory Courses of Polish Language and Culture from February to September 2011, after which they were directed to Polish universities.

From 2006 to 2015, a total of 988 scholarship holders were admitted to the program, who pursued studies at 76 universities. During this period, 332 scholarship holders graduated from Polish universities.

== Organizational issues ==
=== Allocation ===
In September 2006, during the allocation of scholarship recipients to universities, it turned out that the majority of them were not satisfied with their placements because almost everyone wanted to study in Warsaw. However, this was not feasible for various technical reasons. The scholarship holders also protested against what they perceived as poor living and teaching conditions, despite the fact that they were provided with conditions significantly better than those for Polish students. A wave of complaints temporarily paralyzed the work of the relatively small program office. Soon, there were reports of unfamiliar people wandering around student residences inhabited by program participants. These individuals incited the scholarship holders against the program management and encouraged protests regarding the allocations.

Thanks to the flexibility of Warsaw universities, and primarily thanks to the assistance of the authorities of the University of Warsaw, it was possible to fulfill a significant portion of the scholarship holders' demands regarding allocation to Warsaw.

=== Scholarship recipients' absences ===
In December 2006, it turned out that a significant portion of the scholarship holders, for unknown reasons, had numerous absences from classes or did not commence their studies at all. Some of them resigned from the program without informing the office and went abroad or returned to Belarus. Absences were reported across universities throughout Poland. On 21 December 2006, a mandatory meeting of scholarship holders was organized in Jachranka near Warsaw, attended by only 80 out of 244 students. These absences were later attributed to the departure of the scholarship holders to their homes for the New Year. According to Siarhei, one of the scholarship holders, the reason for this phenomenon was as follows:

It was visible during the summer while learning Polish – who wants to learn and who doesn't. Just because someone was in the square or has connections with the democratic movement doesn't mean they definitely want to and will learn.

To determine the true extent of the problem, from January 17 to February 6, 2007, the program director ordered an "Internal Control of the Implementation Status of the Konstanty Kalinowski Scholarship Program". 23 committees were formed, which visited all universities where program participants were studying. During the inspection, representatives of university authorities, tutors, and scholarship holders were met. The inspection revealed that 205 out of 244 students had commenced their studies, attended classes, and did not violate the "Rules of Program Usage". Clarification actions were taken against 32 individuals, and six additional individuals were proposed for removal from the list of scholarship holders due to non-commencement of studies despite being directed to do so. A second internal inspection took place in late April and May 2007 to address the problems identified during the first inspection.

In June 2009, Ina Kulej, chairperson of the Committee for the Defense of the Repressed "Solidarity", admitted that one in five participants had resigned from the program. She cited the main reasons as: lack of the opportunity to study part-time, separation from family and friends, differences in Polish culture and living conditions, and differences in the education system, which in Poland is focused on independent learning. She also expressed a willingness to assist those who had left the program but wished to return.

=== Misconduct of scholarship recipients ===
Due to irregularities in the recruitment process for the first year, a certain number of individuals who had little actual connection to the Belarusian democratic movement ended up on the list of scholarship holders, and their behavior often did not correspond with the seriousness of the Kalinowski Program. Their inappropriate behavior was a serious organizational and reputational problem, especially since all program troubles were observed and widely commented on by official Belarusian media.

Polish representatives from universities, administrations, and NGOs, who participated in official meetings with the scholarship holders, emphasized in their comments their surprise that many students did not speak the Belarusian language and had no knowledge of the history and politics of their country. They also pointed out the indecent way some girls dressed.

In the first days after arriving in Warsaw, several scholarship holders, while intoxicated, got into fights with Polish residents of the student dormitory. Shortly afterward, other scholarship holders identified a boy in their group who, during recruitment, sold fake certificates of participation in the Jeans Revolution in October Square in Minsk for $30.

A specific problem was the violation of regulations by Vitaut Milinkievič, the son of Alaksandar Milinkievič. Vitaut was listed as a "child of a repressed person" among the scholarship holders. On 21 August 2006, while the program participants were on a tour around the country, independent media reported that Vitaut consistently got drunk, acted like a hooligan, and caused problems from the beginning of his stay in Poland. It was also reported that he was removed from the program for his behavior, which was noticed and subsequently publicized by Belarusian state television two days later. The next day, Alaksandar Milinkievič called this information "untrue", and his press secretary, Pawel Mazheika, explained that Vitaut did indeed break the rules – he overslept mandatory sightseeing during the tour. However, he was not removed from the program but rather had his tour interrupted and was deprived of the right to stay in the student dormitory and participate in Polish and English language classes. However, he still received the scholarship and prepared independently for university enrollment. This version was also confirmed by Vitaut himself.

The issue of Vitaut Milinkievič put the management of the Kalinowski Program in a particularly difficult situation. The question arose as to how severely the direct initiator's son should be punished. Ina Kulej stated that she accepts criticism from Polish partners as objective, while Alaksandar Milinkievič admitted that:

All program participants must be on equal terms. It should be like that, regardless of who is whose relative.

The topic of inappropriate behavior of scholarship holders met with various comments from Belarusian democratic circles. Ina Kulej assessed that the main reason for the problems was cultural differences between Poles and Belarusians. Anton Tsyalezhnikau from the Movement for Democracy in Belarus stated that such problems should be resolved within the program and should not reach the media, as they provide fodder for Belarusian government propaganda. Uladzimir Mitniewicz from bel.ini assessed that rebellious and defiant behavior is an understandable, and even desirable trait among individuals who have fought against the authorities and who are expected to lead revolutions in the future.

=== Return of graduates to Belarus ===
Since the beginning of the program, doubts have arisen about whether scholarship holders will want to return to Belarus after completing their education and whether they will have the opportunity to do so. Both official state media and some opposition circles have referred to the Kalinowski Program as "brain drain". A prolonged stay in Poland may prompt some students to settle permanently. Ina Kulej believes that some of the individuals applying for the scholarship did not plan to return to Belarus from the start:

There is a group of people who want to leave Belarus regardless of the political situation. Another group consists of individuals who, if they had not had the opportunity to leave, would not have completed higher education. The attitudes towards applying for a scholarship among these two groups differ. Those who were forced to leave dream of returning, while those who intended to leave the country from the start seek various ways to stay abroad – to get married, find a job, or pursue further studies.

Simultaneously, there is concern about the recognition of Polish university diplomas in Belarus. The Belarusian state does not recognize program scholarship holders as students. Jauhien Skrabutan, a program graduate, has so far been unable to obtain official recognition of his diploma from the University of Warsaw. Moreover, some students have pursued studies in fields useful in Poland but not in their own country (e.g., European integration, Polish law). This means that program graduates have much better chances of finding good jobs in Poland than in Belarus. Additionally, since Belarus officially does not acknowledge that scholarship holders are studying, a significant portion of male students is sought after for evading military service. Wiktoria Chakimawa, a scholarship holder from the first admission, believes that many students find good jobs in Poland and decide to stay permanently:

I understand them perfectly. There are more opportunities here; there is no need to be afraid and stay silent. I like Poland, but Belarus is my country, and it has wonderful people. I don't know how it will turn out, but I would really like to return.

In January 2010, Ina Kulej revealed that by that time, 8 participants of the Kalinowski Program had completed their studies – 5 girls and 3 boys:

- Eugeniusz Gawin – remained in Poland, continuing his education in doctoral studies;
- Wenedykt Klauze – stayed in Poland because he would be arrested if he returned;
- Jauhien Skrabutan – completed his studies at the Department of Belarusian Studies at the Faculty of Applied Linguistics at the University of Warsaw. He returned to Belarus, to Grodno, where he applied for a job at the Grodno Regional Executive Committee's Department of Education. He was referred to the Ministry of Education regarding the recognition of his diploma. He then went to his parents in Zelva and also applied for a job at the Education Department of the District Executive Committee. Initially, he was told that there was a shortage of teachers, but after two days, he received a response stating that there were no vacancies. The scholarship holder remained unemployed, and his diploma was not recognized;
- 5 girls – returned to Belarus and found employment in private enterprises.

=== Death of Kanstancin Zhilinsky ===
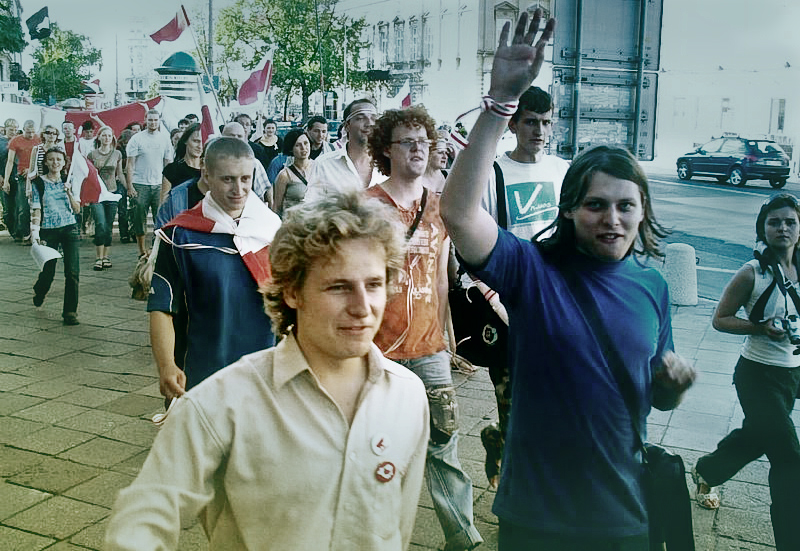
Kalinowski Program scholarship recipients at a demonstration in Warsaw in the summer of 2006. In the foreground on the left, Kanstancin Zhilinsky

In mid-May 2010, the body of Kanstancin Zhilinsky, a scholarship recipient from the first admission and a student of the Faculty of Economics at the University of Gdańsk, was found in a student dormitory in Gdańsk. His roommate discovered the body in the morning hours. Initially, suicide was considered the most probable cause of death, supported by the fact that on the day of the tragedy, the student deleted all his accounts from social media websites. However, over time, this hypothesis was questioned. According to the student's mother, during the investigation, the probability of suicide was estimated to be 40%. Initial reports in the press claiming that the student hanged himself were later refuted. Several days before his death, Zhilinsky paid for his health insurance, indicating that he did not plan to take his own life at that time. Other scholarship recipients and neighbors from the student dormitory also disagreed with the suicide hypothesis. Zhilinsky was buried in his hometown of Rahachow.

=== Scholarship delays ===
It is not uncommon for students studying in Poland under the Kalinowski Program to complain about delays in scholarship payments, sometimes lasting one or even two months, which consequently leads to problems with paying for dormitory accommodation.

== Activities of Belarusian security services ==
According to representatives of Belarusian democratic circles and independent media, the Kalinowski Program significantly weakened one of the main tools of repression by the Belarusian authorities against politically active youth – the threat of expulsion from universities. Consequently, since its inception, the program has been the target of attacks from Belarusian state media, as well as numerous provocations and attempts at discrediting by Belarusian special services.

=== Attempt to discredit ===
On 2 December 2006, an anonymous email in Russian was received at one of the email addresses of the Warsaw office of the program. It was sent from a Russian server and contained instructions in seven points, including instructions to discredit the director of the program, Jan Malicki. It included initials, codenames, and a sum of money in dollars for completing the task. The names given in the email were the actual names of Kalinowski Program scholarship holders. A fragment of the letter, translated into Polish with the names of the scholarship holders replaced by initials, was made public:

Take a prostitute who will engage in sexual intercourse with Malicki and collect compromising material. Responsible – R .; Withdraw the scholarship from V. Responsible – A.

Both the author and the purpose of writing the email remained unknown. According to one hypothesis, the message reached the program office by mistake. However, it is more likely that it was a provocation aimed at compromising the scholarship holders by casting suspicion on them for cooperating with the State Security Committee of the Republic of Belarus. Information about the email was forwarded, among others, to the Polish Ministry of Foreign Affairs. The Internal Security Agency also dealt with it.

Director Malicki had been receiving insulting text messages for some time.

=== Uladzislau "Vector" Mikhailau ===
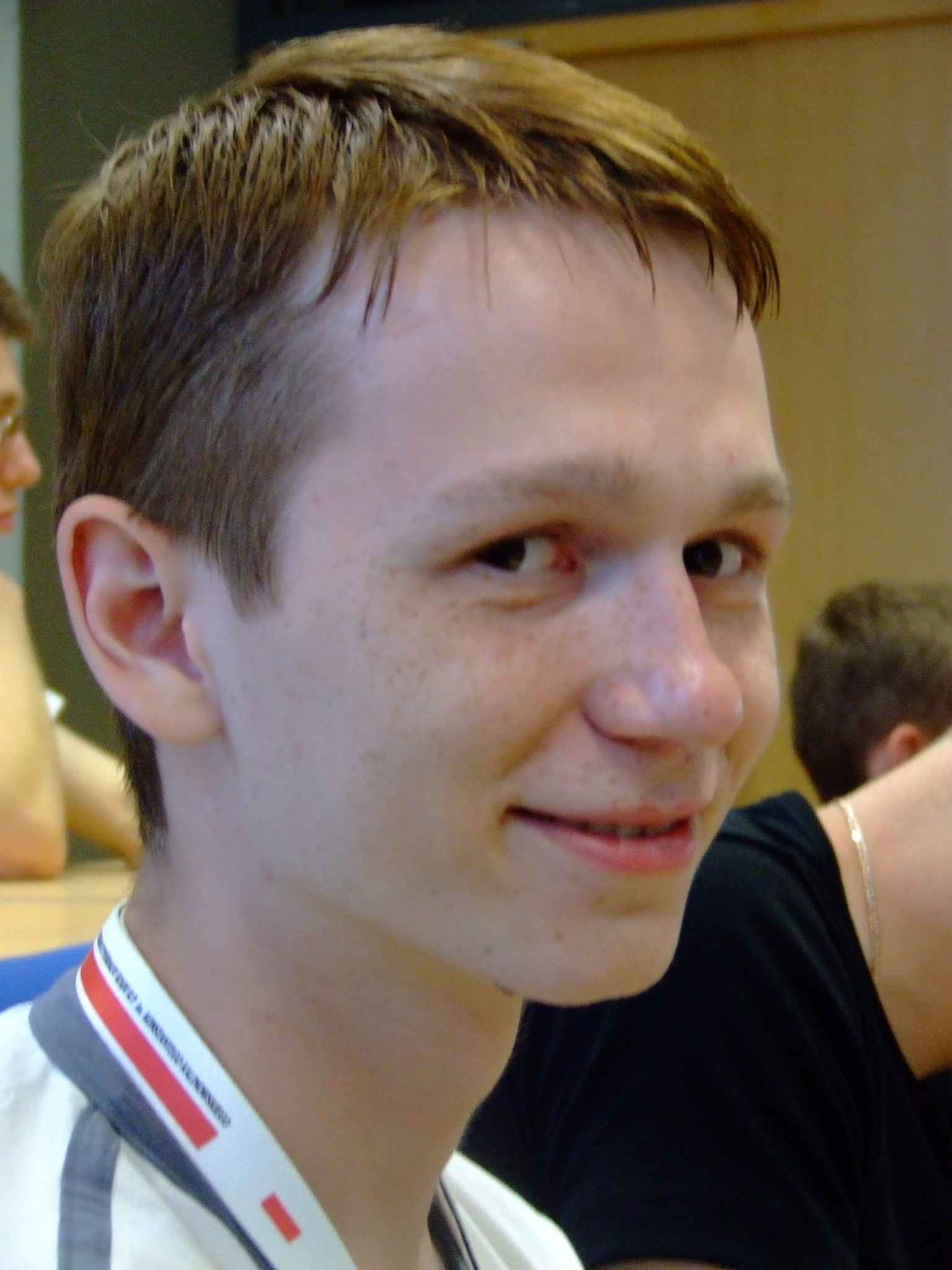
Uladzislau Mikhailau, July 2006

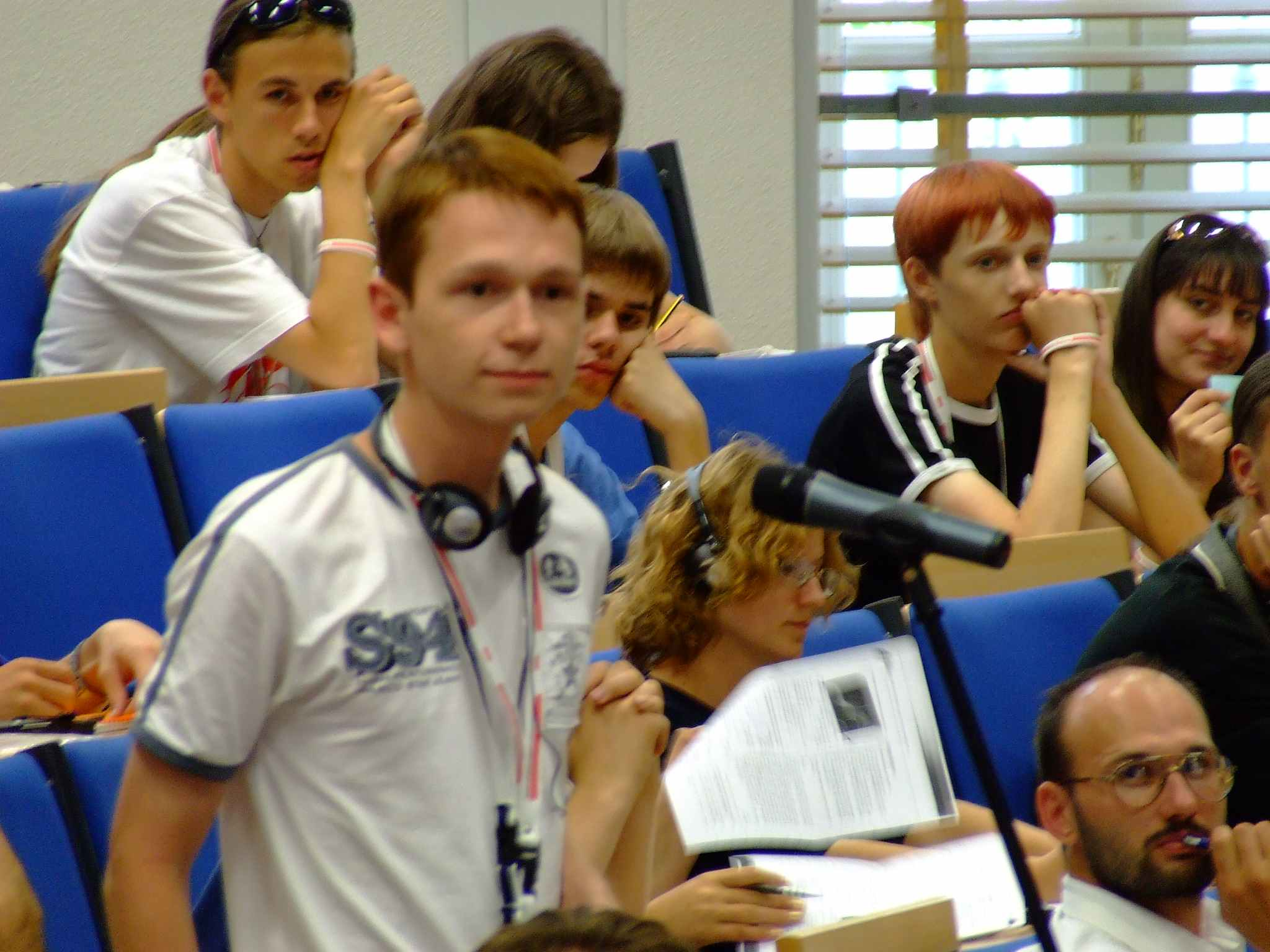
Mikhailau among the scholarship recipients, July 2006

On 22 January 2007, an interview with one of the scholarship holders of the program, Uladzislau Mikhailau, was published in Tygodnik Powszechny. The 20-year-old student of the Faculty of Electrical Engineering at the Warsaw University of Technology revealed that in early 2006, he was recruited by the State Security Committee of the Republic of Belarus as an informant under the codename "Vector" through blackmail. He detailed the recruitment process and his subsequent contacts with the security service – he reported on his colleagues in Gomel, and then continued cooperation in Poland by providing information about the recruitment process and the operation of the Kalinowski Program. He emphasized that he wanted to break off cooperation, and he felt safe in Poland, which allowed him to reveal this secret and thus relieve his conscience.

The declaration caused a stir among the scholarship holders and people associated with the program, as well as a wave of comments in the media. Some of the scholarship holders saw him as a provocateur, while others saw him as a victim of the system. According to Jauhien Skrabutan, one of the scholarship holders, Mikhailau's disclosure was a State Security Committee of the Republic of Belarus' provocation aimed at destabilizing the program. Another scholarship holder, Dzianis Vasilkou, believed that Mikhailau should be helped. Controversies arose regarding the further fate of the student. On one hand, it was argued that a former State Security Committee of the Republic of Belarus agent had no right to benefit from the scholarship for repressed opposition members. On the other hand, Mikhailau's courage was emphasized, and it was noted that there may be other people among the students forced to cooperate with the State Security Committee of the Republic of Belarus. If Mikhailau were to be removed from the program, it would be a precedent for them that it is not worth revealing the truth. There were also voices that Mikhailau should first seek help from the program management rather than giving an interview to the newspaper, suggesting that his only motivation was an unhealthy desire for fame.

After careful consideration, the program authorities decided to leave Uladzislau Mikhailau on the list of scholarship holders and to provide him with support, including a psychologist. At that time, the scholarship holder became the focus of Polish and Belarusian media attention. On March 10, Mariusz Maszkiewicz, a former Polish ambassador to Belarus and advisor to the prime minister for Eastern affairs, visited him. The student said at that time that he had to leave Poland because he was in danger there. Maszkiewicz assessed that Mikhailau was suffering from mental problems, probably severe depression or psychosis, or possibly under the influence of pharmacological substances. The student repeatedly complained that he was being followed and harassed by the State Security Committee of the Republic of Belarus, and later he also spoke about the Polish and American secret services. Aleksei Dzikavitski, a journalist working in Poland for Radio Liberty, confirmed the fact of surveillance – he arranged to meet with Mikhailau for an interview, but unknown men appeared at their meeting and began to aggressively film them. The last time Mikhailau's colleagues saw him in Poland was on March 17, on his 21st birthday. He announced at that time his imminent escape from the country by the ambassador's car. Probably shortly after that, he left for Belarus with the help of the Belarusian embassy. On March 23, shortly after returning to Belarus, state television conducted a lengthy interview with him, during which Mikhailau told a series of lies about the program, living conditions, and education of the scholarship holders in Poland, as well as about alleged coercion to participate in "anti-Belarusian actions". He claimed, among other things, that students had to participate in demonstrations in front of the Belarusian embassy to earn their scholarship.

This event caused a scandal and a wave of comments in both Polish and Belarusian media. Mikhailau's statements were openly contradicted by his previous entries on his private blog, which were highly critical of Belarusian television, for example, from 10 December 2006.

The Belarusian State Television named after A. G. Lukashenko announces that all of us, students of the program, have been abandoned!! We have nothing to eat and live in bug-infested places. No comments. Leave Zimouski (the head of Belarusian television) with the penultimate bullet.

Mikhailau's allegations were also denied by other scholarship holders. Katsiaryna Tamkovich said she did not work off any money and attended demonstrations because of her own beliefs.

In one of the interviews given after revealing himself but before leaving for Belarus, Mikhailau stated that "it is visible" that among the scholarship holders of the Kalinowski Program, there are also other informants of the State Security Committee of the Republic of Belarus.

=== Repression of scholarship recipients and their families ===
- 23 December 2006, at 6:30 P.M. at the railway station in Grodno, Belarusian border guards detained Dzmitry Malchyk. The scholarship holder was returning from Kraków to his home for New Year's. According to his father, Siarhei Malchyk, the boy was questioned by law enforcement officers in civilian clothes. His laptop was also confiscated. The student was held for 5 hours at the customs office, after which he was released on the condition of appearing at the office at a later date.
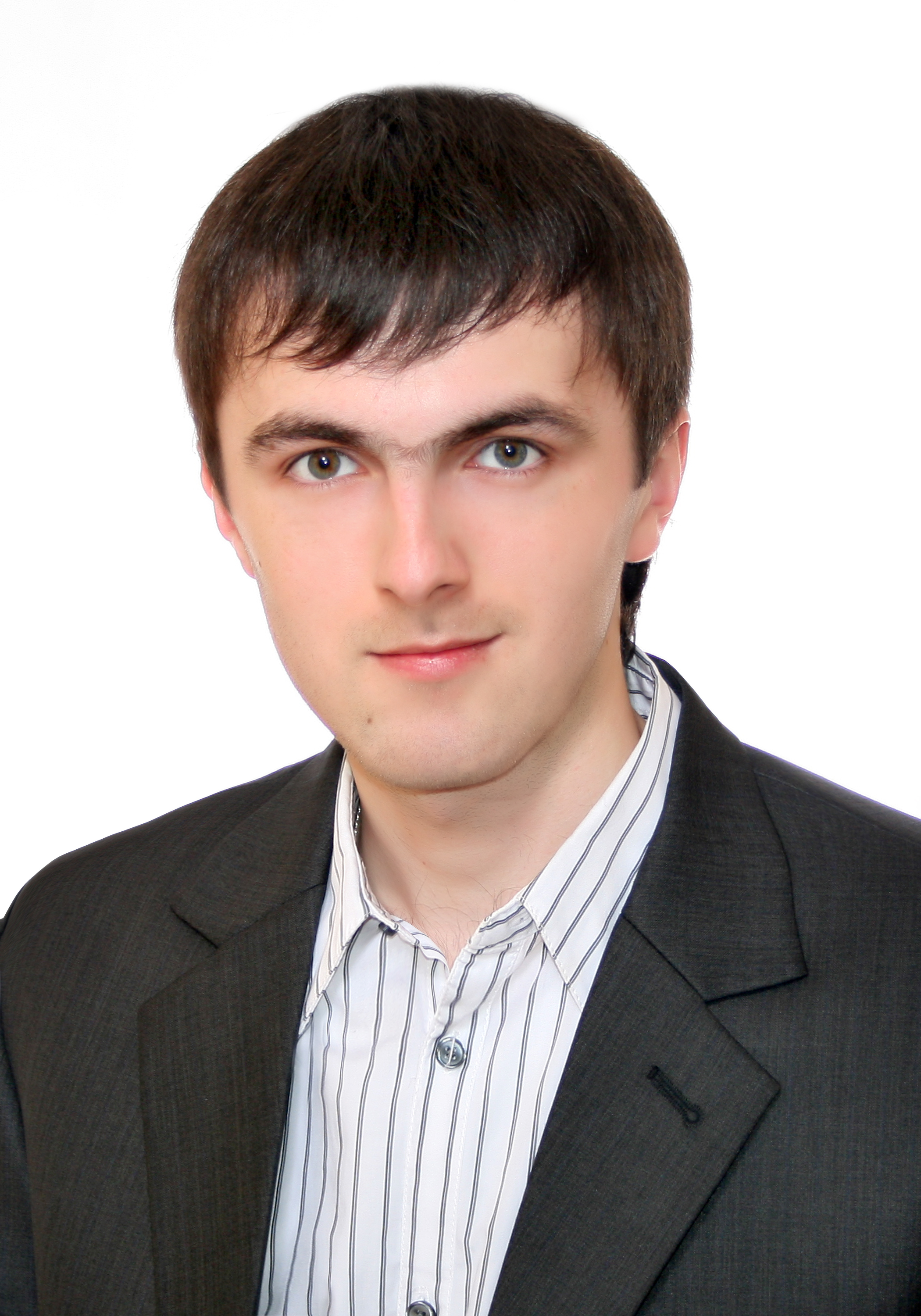
- Jauhien Skrabutan
  On the same day, at 10:00 P.M. at the Polish-Belarusian Kuźnica–Bruzgi border checkpoint, Jauhien Skrabutan, a scholarship holder from the University of Warsaw, and Maryia Svyantsitskaya, a scholarship holder from Katowice, were detained. The students were returning from Poland home for New Year's. Two hours after the detention, they were subjected to a personal search. Skrabutan's flash cards from the computer were confiscated, with the explanation that they needed to be checked. The scholarship holders were detained at the border by Belarusian border guards until 5:30 A.M. the next day. According to Skrabutan, in the previous days, two more participants of the Kalinowski Program were subjected to searches, including Alexander Kopac from Masty.
- On 10 April 2007, Volha Dzimіtruk, who went to Belarus to meet her family for Easter, was forcibly pulled into an unmarked car by State Security Committee of the Republic of Belarus officers in civilian clothes in the center of Gomel. Later, in an interview with the BiełaPAN agency, she reported that she was pressured to provide information about other scholarship holders, threatened, and coerced into cooperating with the State Security Committee of the Republic of Belarus. Two days later, Tatsiana Dzimіtruk, Volha's mother, was visited by a man claiming to be a journalist from Belarus Today and asked about her daughter. Soon after, she began to have problems at work.
- In early 2007, Jauhien Skrabutan was arrested by the Belarusian militia at the station next to the customs control exit. The scholarship holder was accused of cursing and sentenced to 5 days in prison. According to him, the Belarusian authorities had a full list of participants in the Kalinowski Program, and border guards were catching those on the list. He also stated that he was not the only one who fell victim to such harassment, but most scholarship holders do not want to talk about it.
- In the summer of 2007, three days after returning home to Zhabinka for vacation after the first year of studies in Poland, Viktoryia Khakimava was summoned for questioning by the State Security Committee of the Republic of Belarus, where she was questioned about the Kalinowski Program. According to her, about half of all Belarusians studying in Poland after the first year are interrogated by the State Security Committee of the Republic of Belarus, regardless of their political views.
- In August 2007, Raman Uscinou, during his summer vacation at home in Svyetlahorsk, was summoned for questioning by the State Security Committee of the Republic of Belarus. He refused to appear without an official written summons.
- On 23 August 2009, Belarusian border guards at the Kuźnica–Bruzgi border checkpoint did not allow Nadzeya Krapivina to leave the country. The scholarship holder was detained on her way to Warsaw, where she was soon to begin preparatory courses for her studies. The reasons for the ban were not explained, and she was only informed that she was in the computer database of persons prohibited from leaving the Republic of Belarus.
- In December 2009, Artsiom Lastavetski returned from Poznań to his hometown of Baranavichy for New Year's. An hour after his return, he received a phone call summoning him to perform military service. The summons was unexpected because he had previously received a deferment until 2011 on the condition of providing proof of enrollment. Lastavetski suspected that the summons had political reasons and aimed to prevent him from continuing his studies in Poland.
- On 19 December 2010, during the presidential elections, Aleksei Koutun, a scholarship holder from the first admission, was removed from a train traveling from Brest to Minsk by the militia and transported to the Bereza District Department of Internal Affairs. On the same day, during the elections, Ivan Shyla, a scholarship holder from Salihorsk, and his friend Pavel Batuyeu were forced by civilians to stay in Batuyeu's apartment; meanwhile, Anatol Michnavets, a scholarship holder from the first admission, was sought at his apartment by the authorities.
- On 19 December 2010, many scholarship holders of the Kalinowski Program took part in a demonstration in Minsk against the falsification of the 2010 Belarusian presidential election. Before midnight, during the brutal pacification of the demonstration by the militia and the army, some of them were arrested. Raman Shcherbau, a scholarship holder from the first admission, was arrested and sentenced to several days of detention, which he served in a prison in Minsk at Akrestsina Street. Sviatlana Pankavets, a scholarship holder from the second admission, participated in the demonstration with her mother, Iryna Pankavets. Both were arrested and sentenced to 10 days of detention, which they served in isolation cells on 20 Skaryna Street in Minsk. Andrei Kastusiou, the son of presidential candidate Ryhor Kastusioŭ and a scholarship holder from the first admission, was arrested.
- On 28 March 2011, at the Bobrowniki-Brzostowica border checkpoint, Belarusian border guards detained Aleh Kotski, a student at the Nicolaus Copernicus University in Toruń. His passport and laptop were confiscated, and his personal belongings and car, which he was traveling in, were searched. The student was not given an explanation for the detention.

== Social, political and cultural activities of scholarship recipients ==
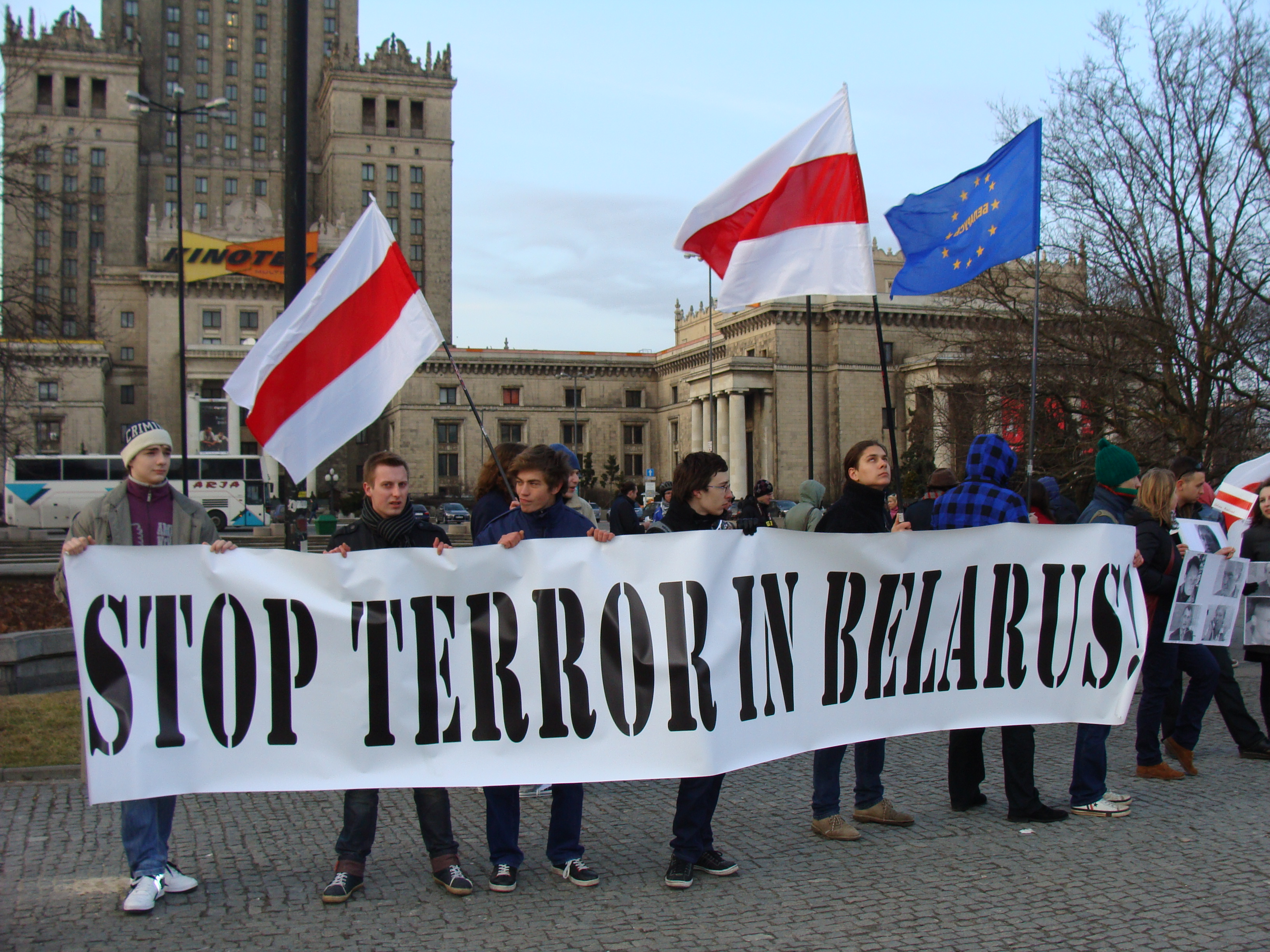
Scholarship recipients take part in a picket to mark the Day of Solidarity with Belarus, Warsaw, 16 March 2011

The activity of the Kalinowski Program scholarship recipients for democracy and human rights in Belarus, conducted in the conditions of emigration from Polish territory, is hindered due to the significant dispersion of students across the country. It most often takes the form of individual initiatives undertaken by individual students or by groups gathered in various cities or at universities. Among the most noteworthy initiatives undertaken by the scholarship recipients are:

- The book Kastuś's Diary authored by scholarship recipient Ludmila Asipenka and international relations student Katarzyna Kwiatkowska; between February and July 2007, they conducted interviews with 67 program participants, from which they selected and elaborated on 12 stories of 14 scholarship recipients; the book contains Polish and Belarusian language versions; it was published on 9 February 2008, with a print run of 1000 copies.
- The establishment of the "Belarusian National Memory" association (Belarusian: Беларуская Нацыянальная Памяць), which is engaged in gathering and disseminating knowledge about Belarus, the history of the nation and its cultural heritage, commemorating national heroes and activists, searching for and organizing memorial sites.
- The involvement of scholarship recipients, including Victoria Chakimawa, in the preparation of the "Solidarity with Belarus 2010" concert organized by The Free Belarus Initiative (the concert did not take place due to the Smolensk air disaster).
- The artistic initiative street-arty.by, involving Polish and Belarusian artists in creating a mural on 22 11 Listopada Street in Warsaw; the idea was conceived by scholar Eugeniusz Gawin, who is also a member of the artistic group Ciąg Dalszy Nastąpi.

The scholarship recipients assisted independent Belarusian media, organized Belarusian evenings at their universities, formed musical bands, staged theatrical performances, and more. Some work as correspondents and technicians for Belsat TV and European Radio for Belarus – two media projects aimed at providing independent information to Belarus.

=== Białystok incident ===
On 23 February 2008, during the Belarusian Song Festival in Białystok, an incident occurred involving participants of the Kalinowski Program. The event was organized by the Belarusian Social and Cultural Society, which is considered to be sympathetic to the authorities in Belarus. During the performances, two scholarship recipients hung the white-red-white flag of Belarus, used by the opposition and prohibited by the Belarusian authorities, between the stage and the audience. Shortly thereafter, they were forcefully removed from the venue by security. This event sparked a wave of outrage among the Belarusian community residing in Poland, as it was interpreted as a form of political persecution. On February 28, an open letter to Prime Minister Donald Tusk was published, requesting action to protect the white-red-white flag from desecration in Poland. It was signed by Eugeniusz Wappa (Chairman of the Belarusian Union in the Republic of Poland), Oleg Łatyszonek (Chairman of the Belarusian Historical Society), and Radosław Dąbrowski (Chairman of the Belarusian Student Association).

== Bibliography ==
- Maszkiewicz, Mariusz, ed. (2009). Białoruś – w stronę zjednoczonej Europy. Wrocław: Kolegium Europy Wschodniej im. Jana Nowaka-Jeziorańskiego. p. 286. ISBN 978-83-61617-80-8.
