= Andrzej Cieszkowski =

Polish diplomat

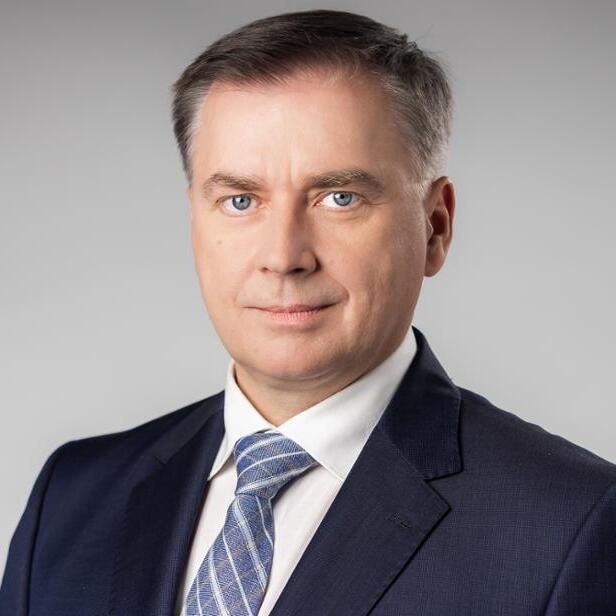
- Andrzej Cieszkowski (2024)

Poland Ambassador to Georgia
- In office 2013–2016
- Appointed by: Bronisław Komorowski
- President: Mikheil Saakashvili; Giorgi Margvelashvili
- Preceded by: Urszula Doroszewska
- Succeeded by: Mariusz Maszkiewicz

Personal details
- Born: 1971 (age 54–55) Choszczno, Poland
- Children: 3
- Education: Moscow State Institute of International Relations
- Profession: Diplomat

Andrzej Adam Cieszkowski (born 1971 in Choszczno) is a Polish diplomat; ambassador to Georgia (2013–2016).

== Life ==
Cieszkowski from 1990 to 1995 studied at the Moscow State Institute of International Relations. He was educated also at the SGH Warsaw School of Economics (1996–1997).

In 1998, he started his career at the Ministry of Foreign Affairs (MFA). Between 1998 and 2002, he was Second Secretary at the Embassy in Lisbon, Portugal. Next, he was working at the MFA Department of the European Union as an expert for Common Foreign and Security Policy and eastern policy. In 2005, he became head of European Neighbourhood Policy Unit. In November 2008, he was appointed Foreign Minister Plenipotentiary for Eastern Partnership. On 27 June 2013, he began his mission as Ambassador to Georgia. He ended his term on 31 October 2016. Following his return to Warsaw, he was working at the MFA Department of Economic Cooperation. In 2024, he became Chargé d'affaires to Brazil.

Married with three sons. Besides Polish, he speaks English, French, Portuguese, and Russian languages.

== Honours ==
- 2012 – Bronze Cross of Merit, Poland
