= List of ambassadors of Poland to Lithuania =

Poland Ambassador to Lithuania
- Ambasador Rzeczypospolitej Polskiej na Litwie
- Coat of arms of Poland
- Style: Mr. Ambassador (informal); His Excellency (diplomatic)
- Reports to: Polish Ministry of Foreign Affairs
- Seat: Vilnius, Lithuania
- Appointer: President of Poland
- Term length: No fixed term
- Website: Embassy of Poland, Lithuania

The Republic of Poland Ambassador to Lithuania oversees Embassy of Poland in that country. They supervise the embassy staff in the conduct of diplomatic relations with the Republic of Lithuania and coordination of the activities of Polish Government personnel serving in Lithuania as well as official visitors. Under the ambassador's direction, the embassy staff provides consular services, including visas for visitors to Poland and passports for Poland citizens in Lithuania.

== List of ambassadors of Poland to Lithuania ==
=== Second Polish Republic ===
- 1938–1939: Franciszek Charwat (envoy)

=== Third Polish Republic ===
- 1991–1992: Mariusz Maszkiewicz (chargé d’affaires)
- 1992–1996: Jan Widacki
- 1996–2001: Eufemia Teichmann
- 2001–2005: Jerzy Bahr
- 2005–2013: Janusz Skolimowski
- 2013–2017: Jarosław Czubiński
- 2017–2023: Urszula Doroszewska
- 2023–2024: Konstanty Radziwiłł
- since 2025: Grzegorz Marek Poznański (chargé d’affaires)
