= Janusz Janke =

Polish politician

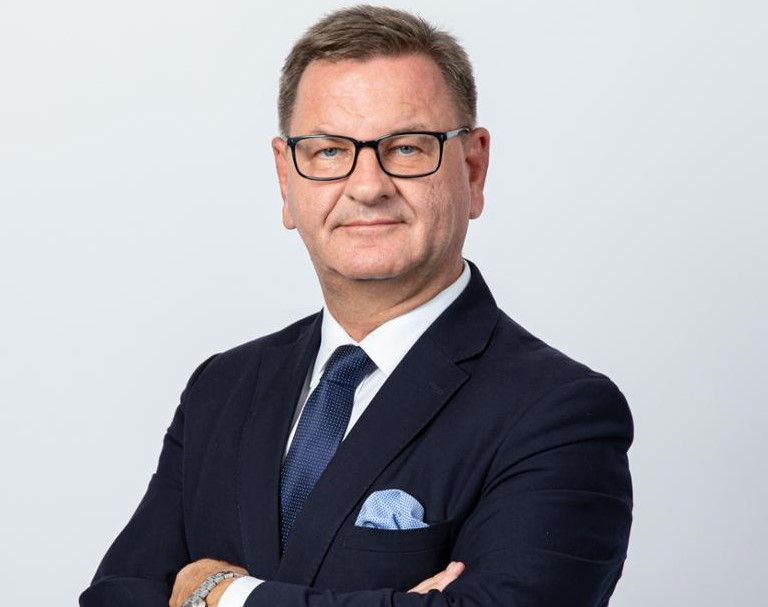

3rd Poland Ambassador to Qatar
- In office 16 September 2018 – September 2024
- Preceded by: Krzysztof Suprowicz
- Succeeded by: Tomasz Sadziński

Personal details
- Born: 19 September 1966 (age 60) Koszalin
- Education: John Paul II Catholic University of Lublin
- Profession: civil servant

Janusz Janke (born 19 September 1966, in Koszalin) is a Polish civil servant who served as the Ambassador of the Republic of Poland to Qatar from 2018 to 2024.

== Life ==
Janusz Janke has graduated in 1995 from law at the John Paul II Catholic University of Lublin and, year later, postgraduate studies for tax advisors.

He started his career in 1995 at the Ministry of Economic Cooperation with Abroad, being responsible for adjusting Poland to the European Union customs law. Between 1997 and 2006 he worked for the Ministry of Economy where, among others, he was responsible for relations with the Committee of Customs Value of the World Trade Organization in Geneva. Simultaneously, he worked as a lecturer in customs law and international trade at the University of Commerce and Law and Higher Customs School (2000–2006). Between 2007 and 2013, he held the post of the Deputy Head of the Embassy in Amman. Next two years he spent at the Ministry of Economy as chief expert. Between 2015 and 2018 he was in charge of the supervision of projects implemented from EU funds at the Ministry of Energy. He was representing the Minister of Economy in the supervisory boards of the largest mining companies in Poland, e.g. Jastrzębska Spółka Węglowa.

Since 16 September 2018 he serves as the Ambassador of Poland to Qatar. Eight days later, he presented his credentials. He ended his term in 2024.

He publishes on foreign trade as well as customs law. In 2004 he was awarded by the Rector of Warsaw School of Economics in the category of "best law books". Besides Polish, he speaks English and Italian.
