= Jan Widacki =

Polish lawyer, historian and essayist (born 1948)

Professor Jan Widacki

Poland Ambassador to Lithuania
- In office 1992–1996
- Appointed by: Lech Wałęsa
- President: Vytautas Landsbergis; Algirdas Brazauskas
- Preceded by: Mariusz Maszkiewicz
- Succeeded by: Eufemia Teichmann

Deputy Minister of Interior
- In office 1990–1992

Personal details
- Born: 6 January 1948 (age 78) Kraków
- Education: Jagiellonian University
- Profession: Diplomat, politician, lawyer, university teacher

Jan Stefan Widacki (born 6 January 1948 in Kraków) is a Polish lawyer, historian, essayist, academic (professor since 1988), diplomat and politician.

== Life ==
In 1969, Widacki graduated from law at the Jagiellonian University. He studied also philosophy. He is an author of over 10 books and numerous articles. He was a faculty member of the John Paul II Catholic University of Lublin (from 1977) and the University of Silesia (1983–1990). He was a vice minister of interior in the Cabinet of Tadeusz Mazowiecki (1990–1992), Polish ambassador to Lithuania (1992–1996), and Member to the Sejm (2007–2011).

He has been member of several political parties and associations: Polish United Workers' Party, Solidarity, Democratic Left Alliance, Alliance of Democrats, Democratic Party – demokraci.pl.

He co-authored, among others, the book Kryminologia: zarys systemu (Criminology: Outline of the System, 2022; together with Magdalena Grzyb, Wojciech Dadak and Anna Szuba-Boroń).

== Honours ==
- Officer's Cross of the Order of Polonia Restituta (2005)
- Knight's Cross of the Order of Polonia Restituta (2000)
- Commander's Grand Cross of the Order of the Lithuanian Grand Duke Gediminas (1996)
