= List of ambassadors of Poland to Belarus =

Poland Ambassador to Belarus
- Ambasador Rzeczypospolitej Polskiej na Białorusi
- Coat of arms of Poland
- Incumbent; Krzysztof Ożanna (chargé d’affaires) since 2024
- Reports to: Polish Ministry of Foreign Affairs
- Seat: Minsk, Belarus
- Appointer: President of Poland
- Term length: No fixed term
- Website: Embassy of Poland, Belarus

The Republic of Poland Ambassador to Belarus is the official representative of the President and Government of Poland to the head of state of Belarus.

== History ==
Until 1991 the Byelorussian Soviet Socialist Republic had been a constituent SSR of the Soviet Union. Upon the breakup of the USSR, the Supreme Soviet of Belarus declared itself independent of the Soviet Union on August 25, 1991, and renamed itself the Republic of Belarus on September 19, 1991. The Republic of Poland recognised Belarus on March 2, 1992. An embassy was established in the capital, Minsk, in 1992, with Elżbieta Smułkowa as Chargé d’Affaires. Relations between Poland and Belarus have been continuous since that time.

Polish Embassy in Belarus is located in Minsk. Additionally there are Consulates General located in Brest and Grodno.

== List of ambassadors of Poland to Belarus ==
- 1992–1995: Elżbieta Smułkowa (until 1992 chargé d’affaires)
- 1995–1996: Marek Ziółkowski (chargé d’affaires)
- 1996–1998: Ewa Spychalska
- 1998: Piotr Żochowski (chargé d’affaires)
- 1998–2002: Mariusz Maszkiewicz
- 2002–2005: Tadeusz Pawlak
- 2005: Marian Siemakowicz (chargé d’affaires)
- 2005–2006: Aleksander Wasilewski (chargé d’affaires)
- 2006–2010: Henryk Litwin
- 2010–2011: Witold Jurasz (chargé d’affaires)
- 2011–2015: Leszek Szerepka
- 2016–2018: Konrad Pawlik
- 2018: Michał Chabros (chargé d’affaires)
- 2018–2023: Artur Michalski
- 2023–2024: Marcin Wojciechowski (chargé d’affaires de facto since 2020)
- since 2024: Krzysztof Ożanna

== See also ==
- Belarus–Poland relations
