= List of ambassadors of Poland to Moldova =

Poland Ambassador to Moldova
- Ambasador Rzeczypospolitej Polskiej w Mołdawii
- Coat of arms of Poland

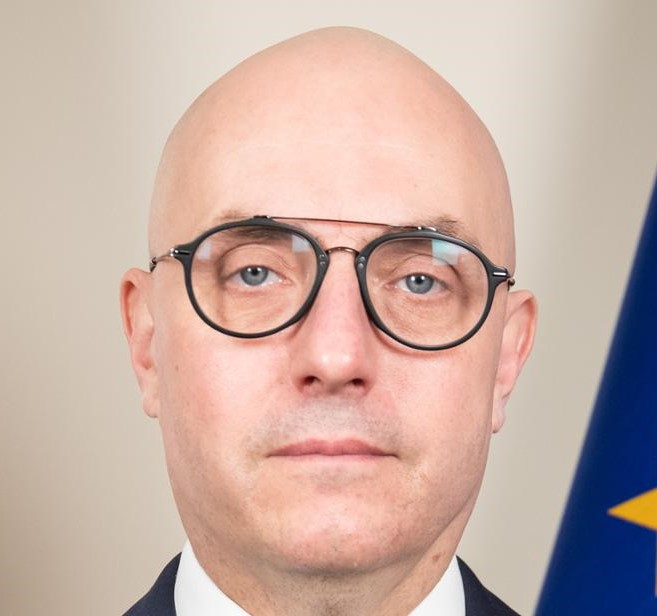
- Incumbent; Tomasz Kobzdej since March 16, 2022
- Style: Mr. Ambassador (informal); His Excellency (diplomatic)
- Reports to: Polish Ministry of Foreign Affairs
- Seat: Chișinău, Moldova
- Appointer: President of Poland
- Term length: No fixed term
- Website: Embassy of Poland, Moldova

The United States Ambassador to Moldova is the official representative of the President and Government to the head of state of Moldova.

As with all Poland Ambassadors, the ambassador to Moldova is nominated by the President of Poland and confirmed by the Parliamentary Commission of the Foreign Affairs. The ambassador serves at the pleasure of the president, and enjoys full diplomatic immunity.

The Embassy of Poland is located in Chișinău.

== History ==
Until 1991, the Moldavian Soviet Socialist Republic had been a constituent SSR of the Soviet Union. Following the dissolution of the Soviet Union, the Supreme Soviet of the Moldavian SSR declared itself independent on August 27, 1991, and renamed itself the Republic of Moldova. The Republic of Poland recognised Moldova and established diplomatic relations July 14, 1992.

== List of ambassadors of Poland to Moldova ==
- 1994: Jan Domański (chargé d’affaires a.i.)
- 1994-2000: Wiktor Ross
- 2000-2005: Piotr Marciniak
- 2005-2009: Krzysztof Suprowicz
- 2009-2010: Marcin Nosal (chargé d’affaires a. i.)
- 2010-2012: Bogumił Luft
- 2012-2017: Artur Michalski
- 2017-2022: Bartłomiej Zdaniuk
- since 2022: Tomasz Kobzdej
