= Tomasz Kobzdej =

Polish diplomat

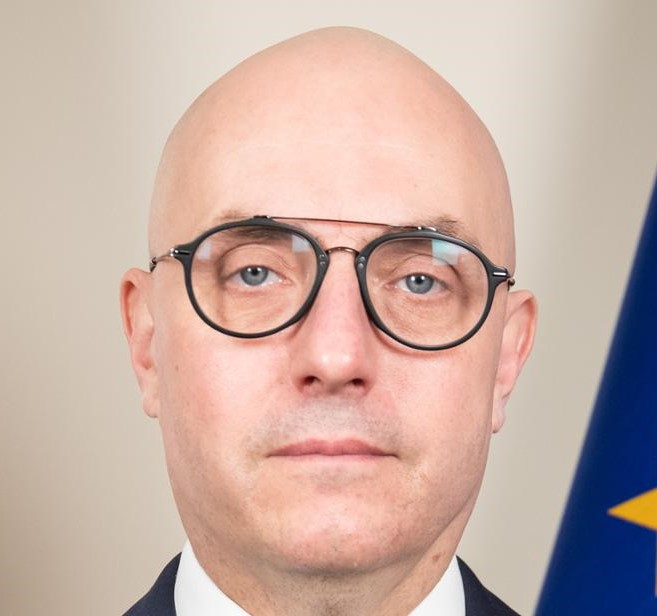

Poland Ambassador to Moldova
- In office 28 April 2022 – September 2026
- Appointed by: Andrzej Duda
- President: Maia Sandu
- Preceded by: Bartłomiej Zdaniuk

Personal details
- Spouse: Marta Kobzdej
- Education: University of Warsaw
- Profession: political scientist, university teacher, diplomat

Tomasz Michał Kobzdej is a Polish political scientist and diplomat who served as ambassador of Poland to Moldova from 2022 to 2026.

== Life ==
Kobzdej graduated from University of Warsaw, Faculty of Political Sciences. In 2011, he defended his PhD thesis on history of Polish political thought. He was also trained at the Geneva Centre for Security Policy, Switzerland, the European Security and Defence College, Belgium, and the Baltic Defence College, Estonia.

He was working at the University of Warsaw, lecturing history of political thought and political geography. In 2005, he became University vice-rector plenipotentary responsible for implementing new Law on Universities. He was also working for the governmental Industrial Development Agency and the Chancellery of the Prime Minister of Poland. Next, he joined the Ministry of Foreign Affairs. Between 2007 and 2010, he was covering European Union defence policy at the MFA Security Policy Department. From 2010 to 2016, he was First Counsellor and deputy head of mission at the Embassy in Tallinn, Estonia, heading it also as chargé d'affaires. Then, he returned to the MFA Security Policy Department where he was in charge of non-proliferation of weapons of mass destruction. From 2017 to 2019, he was heading the unit for terrorism and regional security policy. He was representing Poland at the Organization for Security and Co-operation in Europe and the United Nations meetings. In 2019, he became deputy director for East Asia and China at the MFA Asia-Pacific Department.

Following his nomination on Poland Ambassador to Moldova in February 2022, on 28 April 2022, he presented his letter of credence to the President of Moldova Maia Sandu. He ended him term in September 2026.

He is married to Marta Kobzdej.

== Honours ==
- Order of Honour, Moldova (2026)
