= Artur Michalski =

Polish diplomat

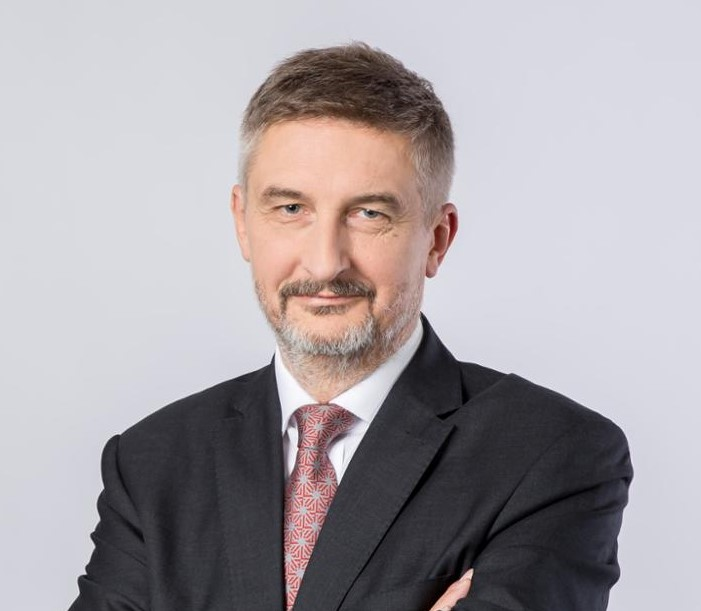

Poland Ambassador to Belarus
- In office 15 May 2018 – 31 August 2023
- Appointed by: Andrzej Duda
- President: Alexander Lukashenko
- Preceded by: Konrad Pawlik

Poland Ambassador to Moldova
- In office 2012–2017
- Appointed by: Bronisław Komorowski
- President: Nicolae Timofti; Igor Dodon
- Preceded by: Bogumił Luft
- Succeeded by: Bartłomiej Zdaniuk

Personal details
- Born: 5 May 1962 (age 64) Warsaw, Poland
- Education: Warsaw Theological Academy
- Profession: Diplomat, journalist

Artur Antoni Michalski (born 5 May 1962, in Warsaw) is a Polish diplomat and journalist; an ambassador to Moldova (2012–2017) and Belarus (2018–2023).

== Life ==
Michalski has graduated from philosophy at the Warsaw Theological Academy. In 1987, he started his professional career at "Ład" ("Order") weekly, as a journalist. He was covering democratic processes in Central and Eastern Europe.

In 1990, he joined the Ministry of Foreign Affairs of Poland. Between 1991 and 1996 he was press officer at the embassy in Moscow, with a rank of Second and First Secretary. In 1996, he has been heading the Russian Unit at the Centre for Eastern Studies, Warsaw. In 1997, he became head of analogical unit at the MFA. From 2000 to 2004 he was press officer at the embassy in Washington. Following his work at the Department of the Americas (2004–2006), he was serving as a deputy ambassador in Ottawa, Canada. In 2010, he returned to the MFA, Eastern Department. From 2011, as its director. In 2012, he was nominated Poland ambassador to Moldova, ending his term in 2017. For the next year, he was director of the Eastern Department again. On 15 May 2018 he was nominated Polish ambassador to Belarus. He arrived to Minsk on 12 June 2018, and in two weeks presented his letter of credence to the President of Belarus Alexander Lukashenko. On 5 October 2023, due to deterioration of Polish-Belarusian relations, Michalski returned to Warsaw. Officially though, he ended his term as ambassador on 31 August 2023. On 1 September 2023, he was nominated Foreign Minister's Plenipotentiary for Cooperation with Belarusian Democratic Forces. In October 2024, he became Chargé d'affaires of the Embassy in Dublin.

Besides Polish, Michalski speaks fluently English and Russian. He has also communicative knowledge of Romanian language.

== Works ==
- Artur Michalski, Na gruzach totalitaryzmu: rozmowy o odradzaniu się chrześcijaństwa w Rosji, Warszawa: Ośrodek Dokumentacji i Studiów Społecznych, 1991.
