= Bartłomiej Zdaniuk =

Polish politician

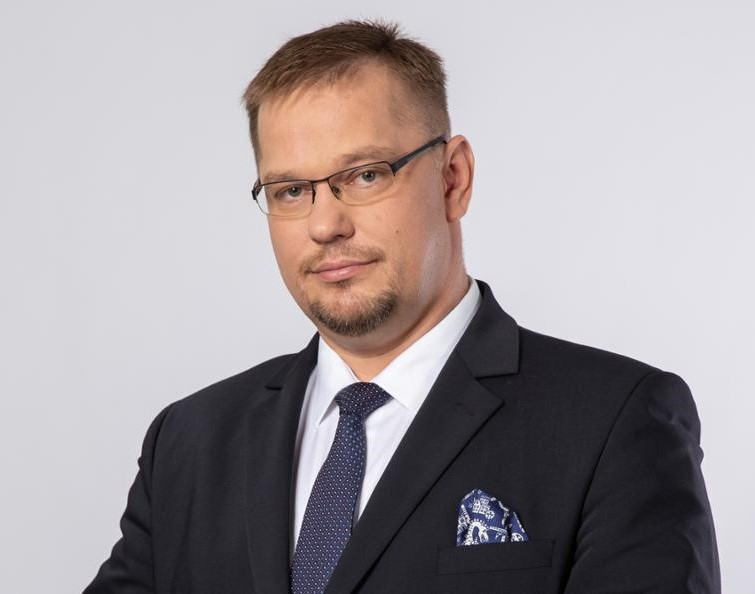

Poland Ambassador to Moldova
- In office 18 October 2017 – 28 February 2022
- Appointed by: Andrzej Duda
- President: Igor Dodon; Maia Sandu
- Preceded by: Artur Michalski
- Succeeded by: Tomasz Kobzdej

Poland Ambassador to Senegal
- In office 2 February 2023 – July 2024
- Preceded by: Margareta Kassangana

Personal details
- Born: 1975 (age 50–51)
- Education: University of Warsaw
- Profession: Political scientist, university teacher, diplomat

Bartłomiej Aleksander Zdaniuk (born 1975) is a Polish political scientist, professor at the University of Warsaw, who served as an ambassador of Poland to Senegal from 2023 to 2024 and to Moldova from 2017 to 2022.

== Life ==
Zdaniuk graduated from University of Warsaw, Faculty of Political Sciences (1999). He was studying also at the Sciences Po (Paris) and the Alecu Russo University of Bălți. In 2007 he defended his PhD thesis on French legislative elections between 1789 and 1914 and, in 2016, post-doctoral degree (habilitation) on politics of Moldova.

In 1999, he began his professional career as a university teacher at the University of Warsaw, becoming an assistant professor. He participated in two OSCE missions to Moldova: 2014, 2016. He authored four monographs, and several articles, as well as translations. He is a member of International Political Science Association.

Following his nomination on Poland Ambassador to Moldova in September 2017, on 18 October 2017 he presented his letter of credence to the President of Moldova Igor Dodon. He ended his term on 28 February 2022. On 30 November 2022, Zdaniuk was appointed ambassador to Senegal, accredited also to the Gambia, Guinea, Guinea-Bissau, Ivory Coast, Mali, Burkina Faso and Cape Verde. He began his term on 2 February 2023 and ended in July 2024.

In 2021, he received an honorary degree from Moldovan State University.

Besides Polish, he speaks Romanian, Russian, French, and English languages. He has also passive knowledge of Ukrainian.

== Works ==
- Konsolidacja państwa w Republice Mołdawii, Warszawa 2016.
- Konstytucja Republiki Mołdawii [Constituţia Republicii Moldova], [translation from Romanian], Warszawa 2014.
- Historia do 1918 roku. Perspektywa kulturowo-cywilizacyjna, Warszawa 2014 [with: Wojciech Jakubowski and Mariusz Włodarczyk].
- Wybory parlamentarne we Francji 1789–1914: problem reprezentatywności wyboru, Warszawa 2005.
