= Urszula Doroszewska =

Polish politician

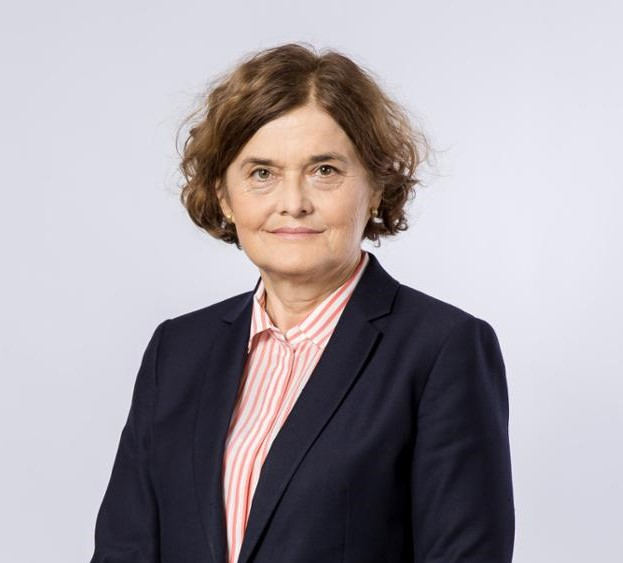

Poland Ambassador to Lithuania
- In office 29 May 2017 – 19 March 2023
- Appointed by: Andrzej Duda
- President: Dalia Grybauskaitė; Gitanas Nausėda
- Preceded by: Jarosław Czubiński
- Succeeded by: Konstanty Radziwiłł

Poland Ambassador to Georgia
- In office 2008–2013
- Appointed by: Lech Kaczyński
- President: Mikheil Saakashvili
- Preceded by: Jacek Multanowski
- Succeeded by: Andrzej Cieszkowski

Personal details
- Born: 2 December 1955 (age 70) Warsaw, Poland
- Spouse: Wiktor Krzysztoporski
- Education: University of Warsaw
- Profession: Diplomat, sociologist, journalist

Urszula Doroszewska (born 2 December 1954 in Warsaw) is a Polish diplomat, journalist and sociologist, ambassador to Georgia (2008–2013) and Lithuania (2017–2023).

== Life ==
=== Early life and education ===
Urszula Doroszewska was born on 2 December 1954 in Warsaw. During her school years she was a scout. In 1978 she graduated with a degree in sociology from the University of Warsaw.

=== Until 1989 ===
In 1970s she was engaged in opposition activities against the Polish People's Republic government. She cooperated with the Workers' Defence Committee. From 1977 to 1989 she was the editor of the independent and catholic press, e.g. journal "Głos". Between 1980 and 1981 she ran the daily news desk for "Solidarity" Mazowsze Region. Following 1981, during the martial law she published in underground magazines. In 1984 she had been arrested for political reasons for 2 months.

=== From 1989 ===
In the 1990s she worked as a freelance journalist, published articles about the changes in the former USSR (mainly about Ukraine, Georgia and Azerbaijan), among others, in the ”Rzeczpospolita” daily. Doroszewska ran assistance programmes carried out in Ukraine (Crimea) and the South Caucasian countries, conducted first by the IDEE Foundation Warsaw, then by the foundation Towarzystwo Demokratyczne Wschód, over whose works she presided from 2002 to 2006.

Since August 2006, she had been working for the Chancellery of the President of Poland Lech Kaczyński as an expert, and, since April 2007 as deputy director of the Foreign Affairs Office there.

From November 2008 until February 2013 Doroszewska was Poland Ambassador to Georgia.

From May 2013 to August 2015 she was Director of the Polish Institute in Minsk. In September 2015 she became an adviser to the President of Poland Andrzej Duda. Between 29 May 2017 and 19 March 2023 she served as an ambassador to Lithuania.

=== Private life ===
She is married to Wiktor Krzysztoporski, a graphic artist. She speaks Russian, French and English languages.

== Honours ==
- Commander's Cross of the Order of Polonia Restituta, Poland (2006)
- Presidential Order of Excellence, Georgia (2013)
- Commander's Cross of the Order for Merits to Lithuania (2019)
- Lithuanian Diplomacy Star (2023)
