= Krzysztof Suprowicz =

Polish diplomat

Poland Ambassador to Qatar
- In office 2014–2017
- Appointed by: Bronisław Komorowski
- Emir: Tamim bin Hamad Al Thani
- Preceded by: Robert Rostek
- Succeeded by: Janusz Janke

Poland Ambassador to Moldova
- In office 2005–2009
- Appointed by: Aleksander Kwaśniewski
- President: Vladimir Voronin
- Preceded by: Piotr Marciniak
- Succeeded by: Bogumił Luft

Poland Ambassador to Yemen
- In office 1996–2002
- Appointed by: Aleksander Kwaśniewski
- President: Ali Abdullah Saleh
- Succeeded by: Mieczysław Stępiński

Personal details
- Born: 15 October 1953 (age 72) Warsaw, Poland
- Children: 2 daughters
- Education: University of Warsaw; University of Bucharest
- Profession: Diplomat

Krzysztof Mieczysław Suprowicz (born 15 October 1953, Warsaw) is a Polish diplomat, ambassador of Poland to Yemen (1996–2002), Moldova (2005–2009) and Qatar (2014–2017).

== Life ==
Suprowicz graduated from English studies at the University of Bucharest and Arab studies at the University of Warsaw (1980). After his studies, he worked for a year as a lecturer. Between 1981 and 1987, he was sales representative in Baghdad of such companies as Budimex, PHZ Polservice, Le Controle Technique.

In 1991, he began his diplomatic career at the Ministry of Foreign Affairs (MFA). He served as First Secretary at the embassy in Bucharest. Between 1996 and 2002, he was ambassador to Yemen, additionally accredited to Ethiopia, Eritrea, Djibouti. In 2000, he was hijacked by local rebels and released after a couple of days. Many news authorities claim that the locals were unhappy with the capture of one of their members, using Suprowicz as a weapon. From 2003 for a couple of months he has been chargé d'affaires at the embassy in Addis Ababa, Ethiopia. In March 2004, he became deputy director of the MFA Africa and the Middle East Department. From 2005 to 2009, he was ambassador to Moldova, from 2014 to 2017 to Qatar.

Besides Polish, he speaks English, Arabic, Romanian, Russian, German, and French. Married, with two daughters.

== Honours ==
- Order of Honour (Moldova)
