= Auditorium Maximum, Warsaw =

Auditorium Maximum
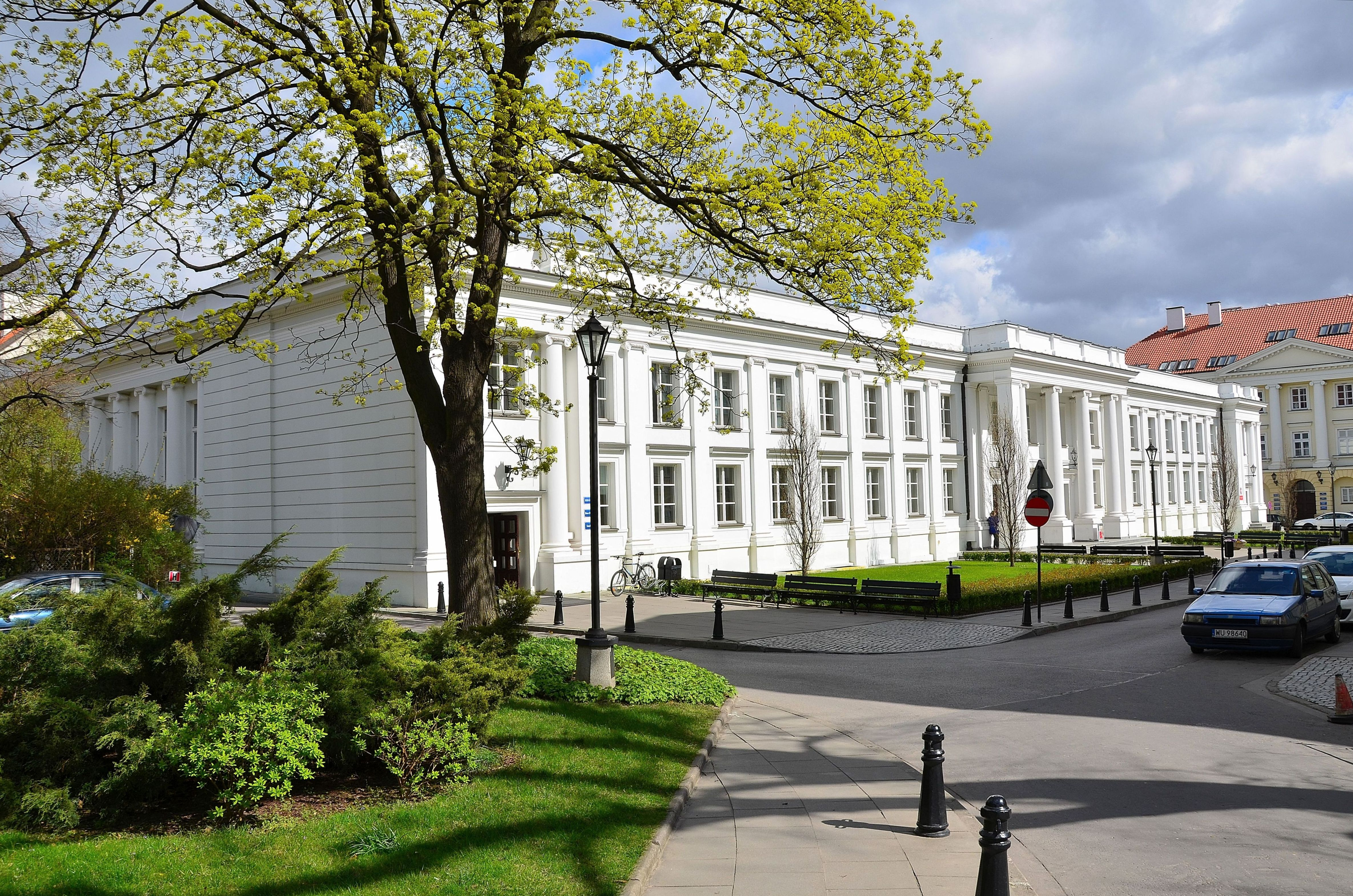
- Auditorium Maximum

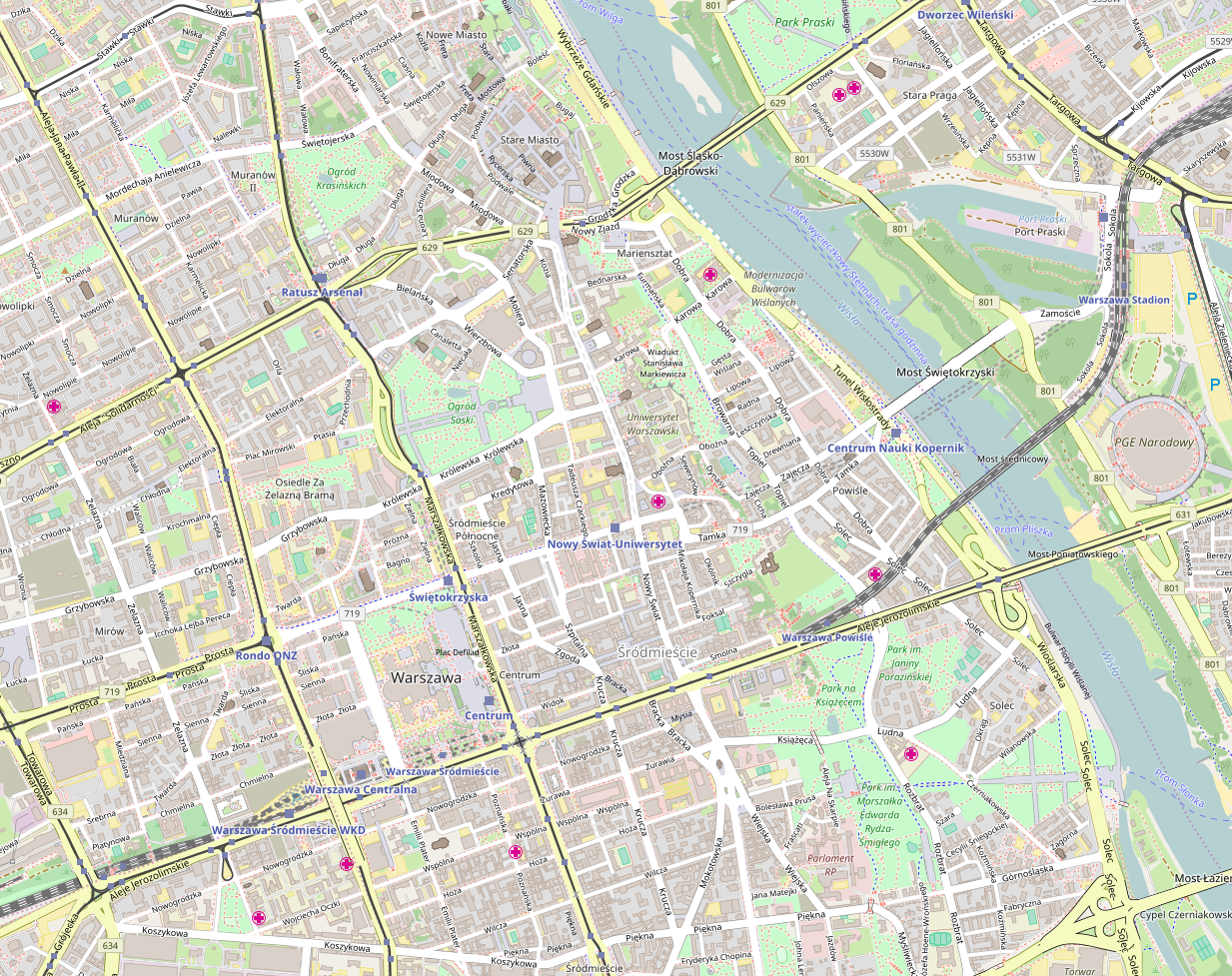
- Location of Auditorium Maximum in Warsaw
- 52°14′41″N 21°00′36″E
- Location: Warsaw, Mazowsze Province, Poland

History
- Built: 1930s
- Rebuilt: 1951–1955

Site notes
- Architect: Franciszek Eychorn
- Architectural style: Classicist

The Auditorium Maximum is a Classicist building located in the University of Warsaw's campus at 26/28 Krakowskie Przedmieście Street in Warsaw, Poland.

The Auditorium Maximum was built in the nineteen-thirties, designed by architect Franciszek Eychorn. During World War II, the building was occupied and used for the storage of armaments by the Germans. The building suffered extensive damage during the war. Between 1951 and 1955 the building was reconstructed, with a slightly modified architectural style. In 2007, the building underwent extensive renovation works, as part of more extensive works to revitalise the whole central campus.
