= Mariusz Maszkiewicz =

Polish diplomat

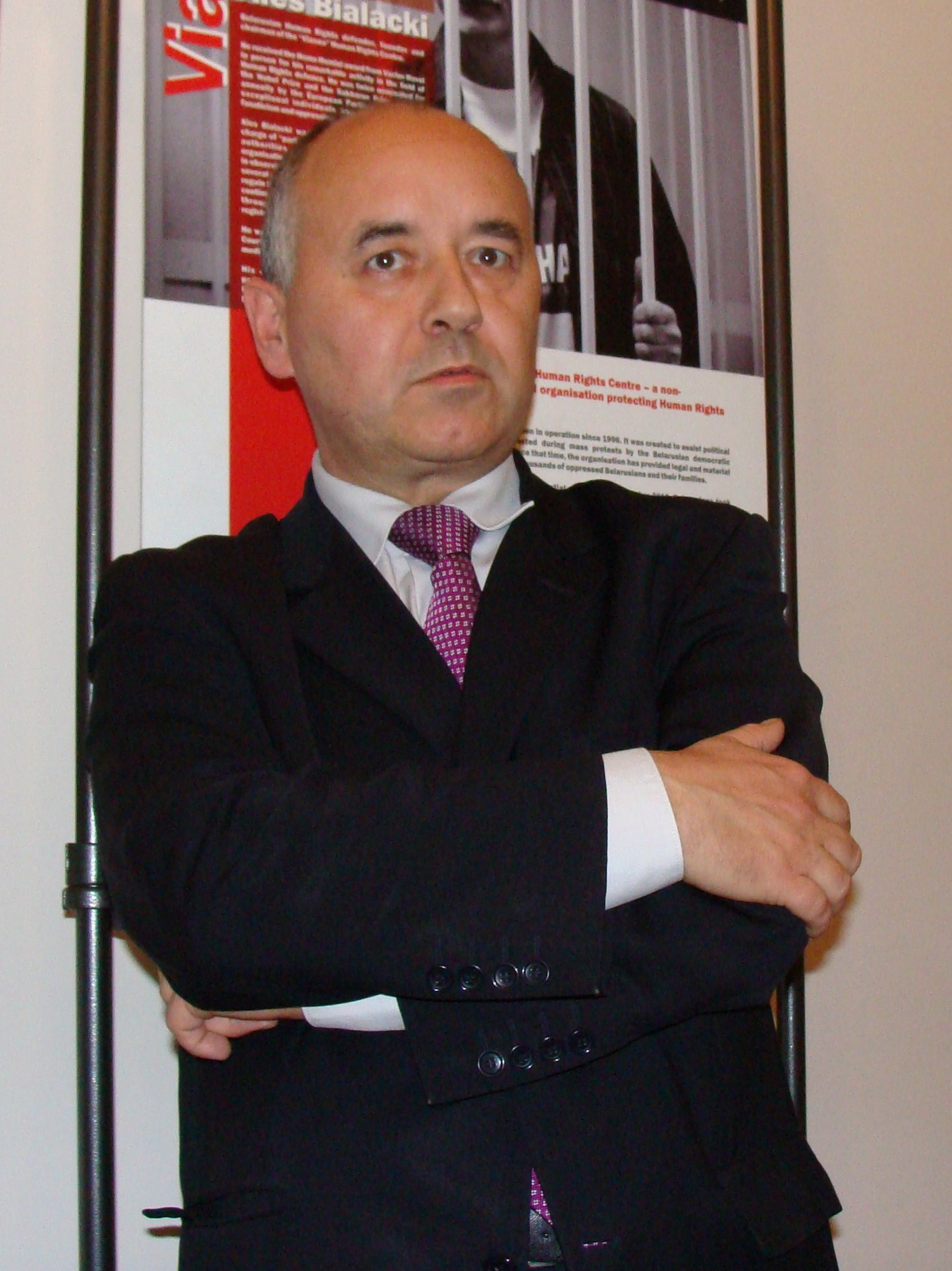
- Mariusz Maszkiewicz (2012)

Poland Ambassador to Georgia
- In office November 2016 – July 2024
- Appointed by: Andrzej Duda
- President: Giorgi Margvelashvili; Salome Zourabichvili

Poland Ambassador to Belarus
- In office 1998–2002
- Appointed by: Aleksander Kwaśniewski
- President: Alexander Lukashenko
- Preceded by: Ewa Spychalska
- Succeeded by: Tadeusz Pawlak

Poland Consul General to Grodno
- In office 1994–1997
- Preceded by: Position established
- Succeeded by: Sylwester Szostak

Poland Chargé d'Affaires to Lithuania
- In office October 1, 1991 – May 27, 1992
- Appointed by: Krzysztof Skubiszewski
- Preceded by: Office restored
- Succeeded by: Jan Widacki

Personal details
- Born: 31 May 1959 (age 67) Iława, Poland
- Education: Jagiellonian University
- Profession: Diplomat, publicist, sociologist and economist
- Website: http://www.maszkiewicz.eu/blog/

Mariusz Maszkiewicz (born May 31, 1959 in Iława) is a Polish diplomat; ambassador to Belarus (1998–2002) and Georgia (2016–2024).

== Life ==
=== Education and first professional experience ===
Mariusz Maszkiewicz grew up in Goleniów.

Doctor of human sciences, a diplomat, publicist, sociologist and economist. He has authored many articles covering diverse sociological issues, as well as studies into religions, anthropology and international relations. Graduated from the Faculty of Philosophy and History at the Jagiellonian University, where in 1993 received the degree of Doctor of Humanities. Studied theology, philosophy in Poznań (1979–1980) and as a guest student at Georg August University in Göttingen (Germany) in 1986. In 2017 obtained degree of habilitated doctor. He read sciences from 1981 to 1989 in the Jagiellonian University of Kraków. During his time there, he became involved in the underground freedom movement that flourished in Poland at that time, and led the Wolność i Pokój (Freedom and Peace) organisation between 1986 and 1990. In 1987 refused to take an oath in the army and was sent to the labor divisions for a year. After release he organized in Czestochowa oppositional anticommunist activity and became one of a leading dissident in the region. Unlike many 'underground' pro-democracy groups, who kept out of public scrutiny to avoid repercussions from the government, members of Wolność i Pokój had an open strategy and strove to make themselves— and their opposition to totalitarian rule— unavoidably visible: they climbed up rooftops, went on hunger strikes, and openly spurned the military, sending back their draft papers.

Published in oppositional press many articles, poems; one of the most important was the mini-novel about polish-communist’s participation in the invasion to Czechoslovakia in 1968, as the manifesto of the peaceful resistance of Polish youth against general Jaruzelski’s regime. Co-chief and redactor of independent monthly “Dyskurs” in Częstochowa. In this city in 1989 became one of a chief of the election campaign of “Solidarity”. Continued to play a role in the public domain after the first free elections were instated in Poland in 1991.

=== Diplomatic career ===
Between 1991 and 1994, he served as an aide-de-camp for the first government, and also served as an advisor on Lithuanian matters. Thereafter, he founded the first Polish consular office in Belarus, located in the city of Hrodno. From 1998 to 2002 he was also Polish ambassador to Belarus.

Arrested on March 24, 2006, alongside hundreds of others, for protesting against the re-election of Belarusian president Alexander Lukashenko, a vote that Western observers claim was fraudulent. Hospitalised soon after his arrest, with heart problems, and claims that he was subjected to 'unmerciful' beatings whilst being transported to his isolation cell.

From January to November 2007 he was the advisor for Eastern Policy at the political office of the Prime Minister Jaroslaw Kaczyński. In 2008-2009 he served at the Ministry of Foreign Affairs of the Republic of Poland on the position of Deputy Director of the Eastern Department. In 2009, he completed a several month course on security at the Marshall Center in Garmisch-Partenkirchen. From 2010 to 2016 he was chairman of the Works Council of the „Solidarność” Trade Union for the employees of Polish foreign service. He worked to improve the conditions for the functioning of Polish foreign service; author of articles, expert opinions and reports concerning the functioning of the Ministry. From May 2013 till November 2016 worked in the Department of Public and Cultural Diplomacy at the Ministry of Foreign Affairs of the Republic of Poland.

From November 2016 to July 2024 he was Poland ambassador to Georgia.

=== Scientific career ===
Ambassador Mariusz Maszkiewicz combines work in diplomacy with the academic activity and teaching. He is a professor at the Faculty of Law and Administration of the Cardinal Stefan Wyszyński University in Warsaw, has been giving classes in the Centre for East European Studies at the University of Warsaw and occasionally at other academic institutions in Warsaw. He has published more than 10 books (monographs and collective works) as well as dozens of articles and studies on international relations, anthropology, sociology, history and culture. Some of his works have been translated into English, Lithuanian, Ukrainian, Belarusian and Spanish.

He speaks English, Russian, German, Lithuanian and Belarusian. On the communicative level speaks Ukrainian and Georgian languages.

== Works ==
=== Articles ===
- Civilian Based Defense System
- State Ideology in Belarus
- The Suwalki Corridor
- Ucrania: el postcolonialismo soviético versus la elección europea (Quarterly Manuel Gimenez Abad, 7-2014)

=== Books ===
- Mystics and Revolution (Mistyka i Rewolucja), Cracow 1995
- Belarusian Tristan, Wrocław-Warszawa 2008
- Belarus Towards a United Europe, Wrocław 2009
- Our Patriotism and Your Chauvinism, Toruń 2011
- Between Security and Identity, Wrocław, 2013
- Repatriation or Repatriotisation, Wojnowice-Warszawa, 2017

== Awards ==
- The Cross of Freedom and Solidarity for opposition activities in the 80s (Movement "Freedom and Peace", taking care of the working people)
- The Order of Gediminas from the President of Lithuania Valdas Adamkus, 2001
- Lithuanian Ministry of Foreign Affairs awarded him with a highest state medal – The Star of Diplomacy, 2012
