= List of ambassadors of Poland =

List of Republic of Poland's ambassadors registered in other countries, including those having dual accreditation (Ambassadors at Large). List updated on 4 November 2026.

== Current Polish ambassadors ==
Host country	Location	Ambassador
Afghanistan	New Delhi, India	Piotr Świtalski (chargé d'affaires)
Albania	Tirana, Albania	Wojciech Unolt (chargé d'affaires)
Algeria	Algiers, Algeria	Krzysztof Kopytko (chargé d'affaires)
Andorra	Madrid, Spain	Monika Krzepkowska (chargé d'affaires)
Angola	Luanda, Angola	vacant
Antigua and Barbuda	Bogotá, Colombia	Barbara Sośnicka
Argentina	Buenos Aires, Argentina	Jan Stanisław Ciechanowski (chargé d'affaires)
Armenia	Yerevan, Armenia	vacant
Australia	Canberra, Australia	Karolina Cemka (chargé d'affaires)
Austria	Vienna, Austria	Zenon Kosiniak-Kamysz
Azerbaijan	Baku, Azerbaijan	Paweł Radomski
Bahamas	Washington, D.C., United States	Bogdan Klich (chargé d’affaires)
Bahrain	Kuwait City, Kuwait	Michał Cholewa
Barbados	Caracas, Venezuela	Daniel Gromann (chargé d'affaires)
Belarus	Minsk, Belarus	Krzysztof Ożanna (chargé d'affaires)
Benin	Abuja, Nigeria	Michał Cygan
Belgium	Brussels, Belgium	vacant
Belize	Panama City, Panama	Jolanta Janek
Bhutan	New Delhi, India	Piotr Świtalski (chargé d'affaires)
Bolivia	Lima, Peru	Anna Pieńkosz
Bosnia and Herzegovina	Sarajevo, Bosnia and Herzegovina	Marcin Czapliński (chargé d'affaires)
Botswana	Pretoria, South Africa	Jacek Chodorowicz (chargé d'affaires)
Brazil	Brasília, Brazil	Andrzej Cieszkowski (chargé d’affaires)
Brunei	Kuala Lumpur, Malaysia	Krzysztof Dobrowolski
Bulgaria	Sofia, Bulgaria	vacant
Burundi	Dar es Salaam, Tanzania	Sergiusz Wolski (chargé d’affaires)
Burkina Faso	Dakar, Senegal	Julita Baś (chargé d'affaires)
Cameroon	Abuja, Nigeria	Michał Cygan
Cambodia	Bangkok, Thailand	vacant
Cape Verde	Dakar, Senegal	Julita Baś (chargé d'affaires)
Central African Republic	Luanda, Angola	vacant
Canada	Ottawa, Canada	vacant
Chad	Algiers, Algeria	Krzysztof Kopytko (chargé d'affaires)
Chile	Santiago, Chile	Michał Świetlik (chargé d'affaires)
China	Beijing, China	vacant
Colombia	Bogotá, Colombia	Barbara Sośnicka
Comoros	Dar es Salaam, Tanzania	Sergiusz Wolski (chargé d’affaires)
Congo	Luanda, Angola	vacant
Costa Rica	Mexico City, Mexico	Agnieszka Frydrychowicz-Tekieli
Croatia	Zagreb, Croatia	Paweł Czerwiński
Cuba	Havana, Cuba	Dorota Ostrowska-Cobas (chargé d’affaires)
Cyprus	Nicosia, Cyprus	Marek Szczepanowski
Czech Republic	Prague, Czech Republic	Barbara Tuge-Erecińska (chargé d'affaires)
Democratic Republic of Congo	Luanda, Angola	vacant
Denmark	Copenhagen, Denmark	Ewa Dębska (chargé d'affaires)
Djibouti	Addis Ababa, Ethiopia	Ilona Korchut (chargé d'affaires)
Dominica	Caracas, Venezuela	Daniel Gromann (chargé d'affaires)
Dominican Republic	Panama City, Panama	Jolanta Janek
Ecuador	Lima, Peru	Anna Pieńkosz
Egypt	Cairo, Egypt	Michał Murkociński
El Salvador	Panama City, Panama	Jolanta Janek
Eritrea	Cairo, Egypt	Michał Murkociński
Estonia	Tallinn, Estonia	Artur Orzechowski
Equatorial Guinea	Abuja, Nigeria	Michał Cygan
Ethiopia	Addis Ababa, Ethiopia	Ilona Korchut (chargé d'affaires)
Federated States of Micronesia	Canberra, Australia	Karolina Cemka (chargé d'affaires)
Fiji	Canberra, Australia	Karolina Cemka (chargé d'affaires)
Finland	Helsinki, Finland	vacant
France	Paris, France	Wiesław Tarka (chargé d'affaires)
Gabon	Luanda, Angola	vacant
Gambia	Dakar, Senegal	Julita Baś (chargé d'affaires)
Georgia	Tbilisi, Georgia	Artur Gębal (chargé d’affaires)
Germany	Berlin, Germany	Jan Tombiński (chargé d'affaires)
Ghana	Abuja, Nigeria	Michał Cygan
Greece	Athens, Greece	Wojciech Ponikiewski (chargé d'affaires)
Grenada	Caracas, Venezuela	Daniel Gromann (chargé d'affaires)
Guatemala	Panama City, Panama	Jolanta Janek
Guinea	Dakar, Senegal	Julita Baś (chargé d'affaires)
Guinea-Bissau	Dakar, Senegal	Julita Baś (chargé d'affaires)
Guyana	Caracas, Venezuela	Daniel Gromann (chargé d'affaires)
Haiti	Panama City, Panama	Jolanta Janek
Honduras	Panama City, Panama	Jolanta Janek
Hungary	Budapest, Hungary	vacant
Iceland	Reykjavík, Iceland	Aleksander Kropiwnicki (chargé d'affaires)
India	New Delhi, India	Piotr Świtalski (chargé d'affaires)
Indonesia	Jakarta, Indonesia	Barbara Szymanowska
Iran	Teheran, Iran	Marcin Wilczek (chargé d'affaires)
Iraq	Baghdad, Iraq	Wojciech Bożek (chargé d'affaires)
Ireland	Dublin, Ireland	Artur Michalski (chargé d'affaires)
Israel	Tel Aviv, Israel	Maciej Hunia
Italy	Rome, Italy	Ryszard Schnepf (chargé d'affaires)
Ivory Coast	Dakar, Senegal	Julita Baś (chargé d'affaires)
Jamaica	Caracas, Venezuela	Daniel Gromann (chargé d'affaires)
Japan	Tokyo, Japan	Konrad Pawlik (chargé d'affaires)
Jordan	Amman, Jordan	vacant
Kazakhstan	Astana, Kazakhstan	Michał Łabenda (chargé d'affaires)
Kenya	Nairobi, Kenya	Marcin Kubiak (chargé d'affaires)
Kiribati	Wellington, New Zealand	Patryk Błaszczak
Kuwait	Kuwait, Kuwait	Michał Cholewa
Kyrgyzstan	Astana, Kazakhstan	Michał Łabenda (chargé d'affaires)
Laos	Bangkok, Thailand	vacant
Latvia	Riga, Latvia	Tomasz Szeratics (chargé d'affaires)
Lebanon	Beirut, Lebanon	Aleksandra Bukowska-McCabe
Lesotho	Pretoria, South Africa	Jacek Chodorowicz (chargé d'affaires)
Liechtenstein	Bern, Switzerland	Marek Prawda (chargé d'affaires)
Liberia	Abuja, Nigeria	Michał Cygan
Lithuania	Vilnius, Lithuania	Rafał Poborski (chargé d’affaires)
Libya	Tripoli, Libya	Grzegorz Olszak (chargé d'affaires)
Luxembourg	Luxembourg, Luxembourg	Rafał Hykawy (chargé d'affaires)
Madagascar	Nairobi, Kenya	Marcin Kubiak (chargé d'affaires)
Malaysia	Kuala Lumpur, Malaysia	Krzysztof Dobrowolski
Malawi	Dar es Salaam, Tanzania	Sergiusz Wolski (chargé d’affaires)
Maldives	New Delhi, India	Piotr Świtalski (chargé d'affaires)
Mali	Dakar, Senegal	Julita Baś (chargé d'affaires)
Malta	Valletta, Malta	Małgorzata Kopeć (chargé d'affaires)
Marshall Islands	Canberra, Australia	Karolina Cemka (chargé d'affaires)
Mauritania	Rabat, Morocco	Tomasz Orłowski (chargé d'affaires)
Mauritius	Nairobi, Kenya	Marcin Kubiak (chargé d'affaires)
Mexico	Mexico City, Mexico	Agnieszka Frydrychowicz-Tekieli
Moldova	Chișinău, Moldova	vacant
Monaco	Paris, France	Wiesław Tarka (chargé d'affaires)
Mongolia	Ulaanbaatar, Mongolia	vacant
Montenegro	Podgorica, Montenegro	vacant
Morocco	Rabat, Morocco	Tomasz Orłowski (chargé d'affaires)
Mozambique	Pretoria, South Africa	Jacek Chodorowicz (chargé d'affaires)
Myanmar	Bangkok, Thailand	vacant
Namibia	Pretoria, South Africa	Jacek Chodorowicz (chargé d'affaires)
Nauru	Canberra, Australia	Karolina Cemka (chargé d'affaires)
Netherlands	The Hague, Netherlands	Margareta Kassangana
Nepal	New Delhi, India	Piotr Świtalski (chargé d'affaires)
New Zealand	Wellington, New Zealand	Patryk Błaszczak
Nicaragua	Panama City, Panama	Jolanta Janek
Niger	Algiers, Algeria	Krzysztof Kopytko (chargé d'affaires)
Nigeria	Abuja, Nigeria	Michał Cygan
North Korea	Pyongyang, North Korea	Radosław Flisiuk (chargé d'affaires)
North Macedonia	Skopje, North Macedonia	Mariusz Brymora (chargé d'affaires)
Norway	Oslo, Norway	Małgorzata Kosiura-Kaźmierska
Oman	Riyadh, Saudi Arabia	Robert Rostek
Pakistan	Islamabad, Pakistan	Maciej Pisarski
Palestinian Authority	Ramallah, Palestinian Authority	Wiesław Kuceł
Panama	Panama City, Panama	Jolanta Janek
Papua New Guinea	Canberra, Australia	Karolina Cemka (chargé d'affaires)
Paraguay	Buenos Aires, Argentina	Jan Stanisław Ciechanowski (chargé d'affaires)
Peru	Lima, Peru	Anna Pieńkosz
Philippines	Manila, Philippines	Katarzyna Wilkowiecka (chargé d'affaires)
Portugal	Lisbon, Portugal	Dorota Barys (chargé d'affaires)
Qatar	Doha, Qatar	Tomasz Sadziński
Romania	Bucharest, Romania	vacant
Russia	Moscow, Russia	Krzysztof Krajewski
Rwanda	Kigali, Rwanda	Grzegorz Morawski
Saint Kitts and Nevis	Caracas, Venezuela	Daniel Gromann (chargé d'affaires)
Saint Lucia	Bogotá, Colombia	Barbara Sośnicka
Saint Vincent and the Grenadines	Caracas, Venezuela	Daniel Gromann (chargé d'affaires)
Samoa	Wellington, New Zealand	Patryk Błaszczak
San Marino	Rome, Italy	Ryszard Schnepf (chargé d'affaires)
São Tomé and Príncipe	Luanda, Angola	vacant
Saudi Arabia	Riyadh, Saudi Arabia	Robert Rostek
Senegal	Dakar, Senegal	Julita Baś (chargé d'affaires)
Serbia	Belgrade, Serbia	vacant
Seychelles	Nairobi, Kenya	Marcin Kubiak (chargé d'affaires)
Sierra Leone	Abuja, Nigeria	Michał Cygan
Singapore	Singapore	Tadeusz Chomicki
Slovakia	Bratislava, Slovakia	Piotr Samerek (chargé d'affaires)
Slovenia	Ljubljana, Slovenia	Leszek Soczewica (chargé d'affaires)
Solomon Islands	Canberra, Australia	Karolina Cemka (chargé d'affaires)
Somalia	Nairobi, Kenya	Marcin Kubiak (chargé d'affaires)
South Africa	Pretoria, South Africa	Jacek Chodorowicz (chargé d'affaires)
South Korea	Seoul, South Korea	Bartosz Wiśniewski
South Sudan	Addis Ababa, Ethiopia	Ilona Korchut (chargé d'affaires)
Sovereign Military Order of Malta	Vatican City	Adam Kwiatkowski
Spain	Madrid, Spain	Monika Krzepkowska (chargé d'affaires)
Sri Lanka	New Delhi, India	Piotr Świtalski (chargé d'affaires)
Sudan	Cairo, Egypt	Michał Murkociński
Suriname	Caracas, Venezuela	Daniel Gromann (chargé d'affaires)
Swaziland	Pretoria, South Africa	Jacek Chodorowicz (chargé d'affaires)
Sweden	Stockholm, Sweden	Karolina Ostrzyniewska
Switzerland	Bern, Switzerland	Marek Prawda (chargé d'affaires)
Syria	Damascus, Syria	Robert Rokicki (chargé d'affaires)
Tajikistan	Tashkent, Uzbekistan	vacant
Tanzania	Dar es Salaam, Tanzania	Sergiusz Wolski (chargé d’affaires)
Thailand	Bangkok, Thailand	vacant
East Timor	Jakarta, Indonesia	Barbara Szymanowska
Tonga	Wellington, New Zealand	Patryk Błaszczak
Togo	Abuja, Nigeria	Michał Cygan
Trinidad and Tobago	Caracas, Venezuela	Daniel Gromann (chargé d'affaires)
Tunisia	Tunis, Tunisia	Andrzej Stolarek (chargé d'affaires)
Turkey	Ankara, Turkey	Maciej Lang
Turkmenistan	Baku, Azerbaijan	Paweł Radomski
Tuvalu	Wellington, New Zealand	Patryk Błaszczak
Uganda	Nairobi, Kenya	Marcin Kubiak (chargé d'affaires)
Ukraine	Kyiv, Ukraine	Piotr Łukasiewicz (chargé d'affaires)
United Arab Emirates	Abu Dhabi, United Arab Emirates	Grzegorz Gawin (chargé d'affaires)
United Kingdom	London, United Kingdom	Rafał Wiśniewski (chargé d'affaires)
United States	Washington, D.C., United States	Bogdan Klich (chargé d’affaires)
Uruguay	Buenos Aires, Argentina	Jan Stanisław Ciechanowski (chargé d'affaires)
Uzbekistan	Tashkent, Uzbekistan	vacant
Vanuatu	Canberra, Australia	Karolina Cemka (chargé d'affaires)
Vatican City	Vatican City	vacant
Venezuela	Caracas, Venezuela	Daniel Gromann (chargé d'affaires)
Vietnam	Hanoi, Vietnam	Joanna Skoczek (chargé d'affaires)
Yemen	Riyadh, Saudi Arabia	Robert Rostek
Zambia	Pretoria, South Africa	Jacek Chodorowicz (chargé d'affaires)
Zimbabwe	Pretoria, South Africa	Jacek Chodorowicz (chargé d'affaires)

== International organisations ==
Host organisation	Location	Ambassador
(European Union) Council of Europe	Strasbourg, France	vacant
EU	Brussels, Belgium	Agnieszka Bartol
NATO	Brussels, Belgium	Jacek Najder
Organisation for Economic Co-operation and Development	Paris, France	Jacek Rostowski
UNESCO	Paris, France	Maja Wawrzyk
United Nations	Geneva, Switzerland	Mirosław Broiło
United Nations	New York City, United States	vacant
United Nations and OSCE	Vienna, Austria	Marek Szczygieł (acting head)
United Nations	Nairobi, Kenya	Marcin Kubiak (chargé d'affaires)

== See also ==
- List of ambassadors to Poland

== Sources ==
- Polish diplomatic missions abroad
