= List of ambassadors of Poland to North Macedonia =

Poland Ambassador to North Macedonia
- Ambasador Rzeczypospolitej Polskiej w Północnej Macedonii
- Coat of arms of Poland
- Style: Mr. Ambassador (informal); His Excellency (diplomatic)
- Reports to: Polish Ministry of Foreign Affairs
- Seat: Skopje, North Macedonia
- Appointer: President of Poland
- Term length: No fixed term
- Website: Embassy of Poland, North Macedonia

The Republic of Poland Ambassador to North Macedonia is Poland's foremost representative in North Macedonia. He is also official representative of the President and Government of Poland to the President and Government of North Macedonia.

As with all Polish ambassadors, Poland Ambassador to North Macedonia serves at the pleasure of the President and enjoys full diplomatic immunity.

The Embassy of Poland is located in the capital of Skopje, and there is Honorary Consulate located in Ohrid.

== History ==
During the dissolution of the Yugoslavia, its constituent Socialist Republic of Macedonia organised independence referendum which resulted that Macedonia became an independent country. Poland established diplomatic relations with Macedonia in 1993 however until 1997 there was no Polish diplomatic mission in North Macedonia. In 1996 Poland opened its embassy in Skopje with Władysław Bilut as chargé d'affairs. Bilateral relations between two countries are good which is connected with memorable aid given by Polish nation during 1963 Skopje earthquake, also since Macedonia gained independence Poland supports Macedonian aspirations to join European Union.

== List of ambassadors of Poland to North Macedonia ==
- 1997–2000: Władysław Bilut (chargé d’affaires)
- 2000–2006: Andrzej Dobrzyński (until 2003 as chargé d’affaires)
- 2006–2007: Grzegorz Mazek (chargé d’affaires)
- 2007–2011: Karol Bachura
- 2011–2013: Przemysław Czyż
- 2014–2018: Jacek Multanowski
- 2018–2023: Wojciech Tyciński
- 2023–2024: Krzysztof Grzelczyk
- since 2024: Mariusz Brymora (chargé d’affaires)
