= Marcin Kubiak =

Marcin Kubiak may refer to:

- Marcin Kubiak (astronomer)
- Marcin Kubiak (diplomat)
