= List of ambassadors of Poland to Albania =

Poland Ambassador to Albania
- Ambasador Rzeczypospolitej Polskiej w Albanii
- Coat of arms of Poland
- Style: Madam Ambassador (informal); Her Excellency (diplomatic)
- Reports to: Polish Ministry of Foreign Affairs
- Seat: Tirana, Albania
- Appointer: President of Poland
- Term length: No fixed term
- Website: Embassy of Poland, Albania

The Republic of Poland Ambassador to Albania is the official representative of the President and Government of Poland to the President and Government of Albania.

As with all Poland Ambassadors, the ambassador to Albania is nominated by the President of Poland and confirmed by the Parliamentary Commission of the Foreign Affairs. The ambassador serves at the pleasure of the president, and enjoys full diplomatic immunity.

The Embassy of Poland is located in Tirana.

== History ==
Bilateral relations between Poland and Albania are dated since 1937 when the two countries established diplomatic relations. However, in this years Poland did not have diplomatic mission in Albania and instead was represented by Poland Envoy to Greece residing in Athens. In 1938 he attended the wedding of King Zogu I of Albania and Princess Geraldine Apponyi. During World War II diplomatic relations were ceased. In 1945 Poland and Albania restored diplomatic relations. In 1949 Poland opened embassy in Tirana. In 1966 Polish People's Republic acknowledged activities of then Albania Ambassador to Poland as inconsistent with international standards. In retaliation, the Albanian side expelled then Poland Ambassador to Albania. Since that time until 1990 diplomatic relations between two countries were weak. After the fall of communism in Albania diplomatic relations have improved.

== List of ambassadors of Poland to Albania ==
=== Polish People's Republic ===
- 1949–1952 – Bolesław Jeleń (chargé d’affaires)
- 1952–1954 – Aleksander Skrzynia (chargé d’affaires)
- 1954–1956 – Edward Pietkiewicz
- 1956–1964 – Stefan Przeniosło
- 1964–1966 – Stanisław Rogulski
- 1966–1967 – Tadeusz Grodecki (chargé d’affaires)
- 1967–1971 – Piotr Głowacki (chargé d’affaires)
- 1971–1976 – Aleksander Dzienisiuk (chargé d’affaires)
- 1976–1979 – Jan Gajda (chargé d’affaires)
- 1979–1983 – Tadeusz Hankiewicz (chargé d’affaires)
- 1983–1987 – Jan Siuchniński (chargé d’affaires)
- 1987–1990 – Władysław Ciastoń

=== Third Polish Republic ===
- 1991–1994 – Jerzy Zawalonka (chargé d’affaires)
- 1994–1997 – Mirosław Pałasz
- 1997–1999 – Artur Tomaszewski (chargé d’affaires)
- 1999–2002 – Andrzej Chodakowski
- 2002–2008 – Artur Tomaszewski
- 2008–2012 – Irena Tatarzyńska
- 2012–2016 – Marek Jeziorski
- 2016–2021 – Karol Bachura
- 2021–2024 – Monika Zuchniak-Pazdan
- since 2025 – Wojciech Unolt (chargé d’affaires)
