= Pęksa =

Pęksa is a Polish surname. Notable people with the surname include:

- Beata Pęksa, Polish diplomat
- Józefa Czerniawska-Pęksa (born 1937), Polish cross-country skier

== See also ==
- Mikuláš Peksa (born 1986), Czech physicist and politician
