= Ziętara =

Ziętara is a Polish surname. Notable people with the surname include:

- Jarosław Ziętara (1968–1992), Polish journalist
- Maciej Ziętara (born 1971), Polish translator, civil servant, and diplomat
- Walenty Ziętara (born 1948), Polish ice hockey player
- Valentin Zietara (born 1883), German-Polish graphic artist
