= Pazdan =

Pazdan is a surname. Notable people with the surname include:

- Michał Pazdan (born 1987), Polish footballer
- Monika Zuchniak-Pazdan (born 1974), Polish diplomat
