= Calka =

Calka or Całka may refer to:

- Maurice Calka (1921–1999), Polish-French sculptor, designer and urbanist
- Marek Całka (1966–), Polish civil servant and career diplomat
