= Krzysztof Bojko =

Polish diplomat

Krzysztof Bojko Ph.D.
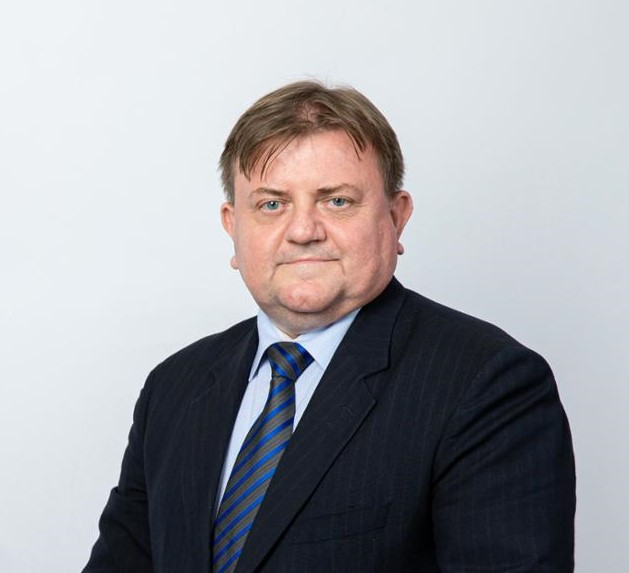

Poland Ambassador to Jordan
- In office 3 December 2012 – September 2016
- Preceded by: Andrzej Biera
- Succeeded by: Andrzej Świeżaczyński

Poland Ambassador to Mongolia
- In office 28 May 2019 – July 2025
- Preceded by: Michał Łabenda
- Succeeded by: Krzysztof Świderek

Personal details
- Born: 21 May 1963 (age 63) Czeladź
- Children: three
- Education: Jagiellonian University
- Profession: Diplomat, historian, political scientist

Krzysztof Zbigniew Bojko (born 21 May 1963, in Czeladź) is a Polish diplomat and historian, ambassador to Jordan (2012–2016) and Mongolia (2019–2025).

== Life ==
Bojko graduated in history at the Jagiellonian University in 1991. later in 1999, he also received the degree of doctor in history from Jagiellonian University, defending the thesis on Ivan III of Russia's foreign policy. In 2007, he gained post-doctoral degree (habilitation) in political sciences on Israeli-Palestinian relations.

He has been working as an associate professor at the Jagiellonian University. In 1998, Bojko joined the Ministry of Foreign Affairs, Department of Africa, Asia, Australia and Oceania, later Department of Africa and the Middle East. Between 2000 and 2005 he was working as First Secretary at the embassy in Tel Aviv, Israel. From May 2009 he was representing Poland to Jordan. Firstly, as chargé d'affaires and, from 3 December 2012 to September 2016, as an ambassador. In 2017, he became professor at the War Studies Academy. In April 2019, he was appointed Poland Ambassador to Mongolia. On 28 May 2019, he presented his letter of credence to the President of Mongolia Khaltmaagiin Battulga.

He speaks English, Russian, and German. He is married, with three children.

== Works ==
- Działalność duchowieństwa katolickiego w Związku Harcerstwa Polskiego w latach 1921–1939, Legnica: WSD DL, 1998.
- Izrael a aspiracje Palestyńczyków 1987–2006, Warszawa: Polski Instytut Spraw Międzynarodowych, 2006.
- Wybrane aspekty polityki Izraela, Stanów Zjednoczonych i Unii Europejskiej wobec Palestyńskiej Władzy Narodowej: 2000–2007, Kraków: Księgarnia Akademicka, 2007.
- Stosunki dyplomatyczne Moskwy z Europą Zachodnią w czasach Iwana III, Kraków: Księgarnia Akademicka, 2010.
- Stosunki polsko-jordańskie, Amman: Ambasada RP: Jordan Press Foundation, 2015.
- Harcerstwo polskie na Litwie Kowieńskiej w latach 1918–1945, Warszawa: Niezależne Wydawnictwo Harcerskie: Związek Harcerstwa Rzeczypospolitej; Wilno: Związek Harcerstwa Polskiego na Litwie, 2015.
