= Wojciech Tyciński =

Polish diplomat

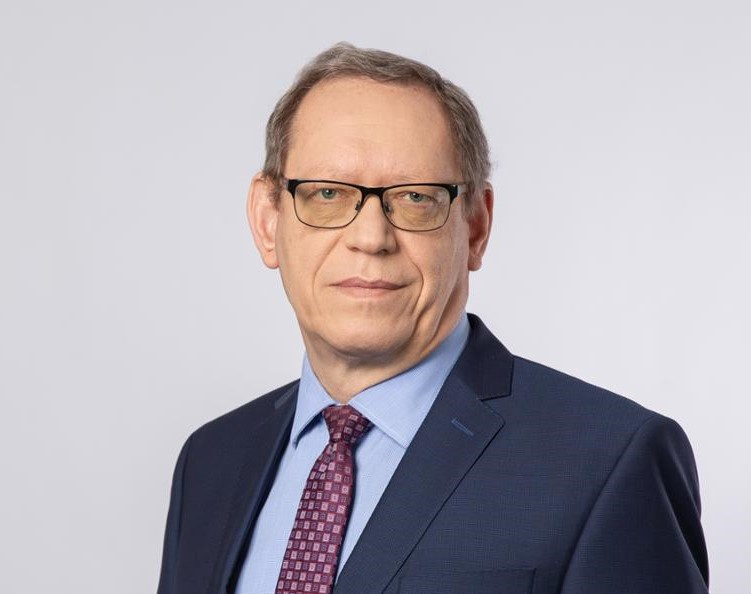

Poland Ambassador to North Macedonia
- In office 27 September 2018 – 15 March 2023
- Appointed by: Andrzej Duda
- President: Gjorge Ivanov; Stevo Pendarovski
- Preceded by: Jacek Multanowski
- Succeeded by: Krzysztof Grzelczyk

Poland Consul General in Lyon
- In office 2009–2013
- Preceded by: Piotr Adamiuk
- Succeeded by: Dariusz Wiśniewski

Poland Consul General in Edinburgh
- In office 2001–2005
- Preceded by: Aleksander Dietkow
- Succeeded by: Aleksander Dietkow

Poland Consul General in Toronto
- In office 1994–1999
- Preceded by: Andrzej Brzozowski
- Succeeded by: Jacek Junosza Kisielewski

Personal details
- Born: 1959 (age 66–67) Warsaw
- Spouse: Małgorzata
- Children: Marta
- Education: University of Warsaw
- Profession: Diplomat

Wojciech Jerzy Tyciński (born 1959, in Warsaw) is a Polish diplomat, ambassador to North Macedonia (2018–2023).

== Life ==
Tyciński graduated in 1983 from University of Warsaw, Faculty of Political Sciences. He was educated at The Hague Academy of International Law. Until 1990 he has been working at the Polish Academy of Sciences, specializing in history of Czechoslovakia.

In 1991, he joined the Ministry of Foreign Affairs of Poland, starting from the expert post to the head of division, and then deputy director of the Department of Consular Affairs and Polish Diaspora. Between 1994 and 1999 he was Consul-General in Toronto. For the next two years, he was director of the MFA Department of Cooperation with the Polish Diaspora. From 2001 to 2005 he was representing Poland as Consul-General in Edinburgh. Since 2005, he was back in Warsaw at the Department of Consular Affairs and Polish Diaspora, as head of division and deputy director. In 2009, Tyciński became Consul-General for the third time – in Lyon. Ending his service there in 2013, he returned to the MFA Department of Cooperation with the Polish Diaspora, as head of division and deputy director. On 28 August 2018, he was nominated Poland ambassador to Macedonia (since 2019 North Macedonia), presenting his letter of credence on 6 December 2018. He ended his term on 15 March 2023.

He is married to Małgorzata, with daughter Marta. Besides Polish, he speaks English and French.
