= Karol Bachura =

Polish diplomat

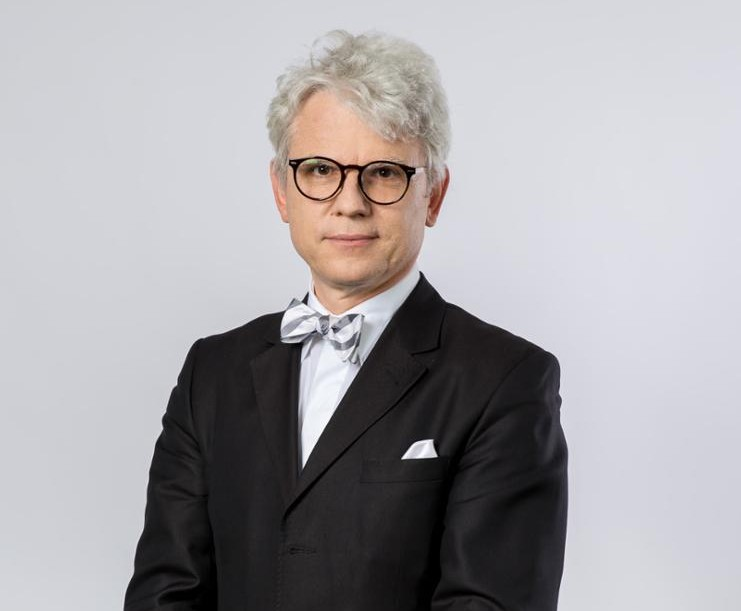

Poland Ambassador to Albania
- In office August 2016 – January 2021
- Appointed by: Andrzej Duda
- President: Bujar Nishani; Ilir Meta
- Preceded by: Marek Jeziorski
- Succeeded by: Monika Zuchniak-Pazdan

Deputy High Representative for Bosnia and Herzegovina
- In office September 2011 – September 2013
- Appointed by: Peace Implementation Council

Poland Ambassador Macedonia
- In office December 2007 – August 2011
- Appointed by: Lech Kaczyński
- President: Branko Crvenkovski; Gjorge Ivanov
- Preceded by: Andrzej Dobrzyński
- Succeeded by: Przemysław Czyż

Personal details
- Born: 4 June 1964 (age 62) Warsaw
- Spouse: Małgorzata Bachura
- Education: Eötvös Loránd University
- Profession: Diplomat

Dariusz Karol Bachura, styling himself Karol Bachura (born 4 June 1964 in Warsaw) is a Polish diplomat with the rank of Ambassador-at-large, specialist in the region of Southeastern Europe; an ambassador to Macedonia (2007–2011) and Albania (2016–2021).

== Life ==
Karol Bachura graduated from English philology and pedagogical studies at the Eötvös Loránd University, Hungary. He has studied in the United States and United Kingdom, as well.

He has been working for the Office for Democratic Institutions and Human Rights in Warsaw, Phare programme, consulate of Canada in Warsaw. In 1993, Bachura joined the Ministry of Foreign Affairs of Poland. For three years, he was working as an expert in the Central Europe Unit. Between 1996 and 1998, he was First Secretary at the embassy in Ljubljana. Next, he was deputy chief of mission in Budapest (1998) and Zagreb (1999–2001). For the next six years, he worked at the MFA headquarter in Warsaw as a specialist at the Export Policy Department and First Counsellor at the Security Policy Department. From 12 December 2007 to 15 August 2011, he served as an ambassador to Macedonia. Between September 2011 and September 2013, with the mandate of the UN Security Council, he headed the Banja Luka Regional Office of the High Representative for Bosnia and Herzegovina. Afterwards, from 2013 to 2016, he was back in Warsaw, at the MFA Eastern Department. In August 2016, he was appointed Poland ambassador to Albania. He ended his term on 31 January 2021.

Bachura is married to Małgorzata Bachura. Besides Polish, he speaks fluently English and Hungarian. He has also communicative knowledge of French, German, Serbo-Croatian and Macedonian languages.
