= Przemysław Czyż =

Polish diplomat

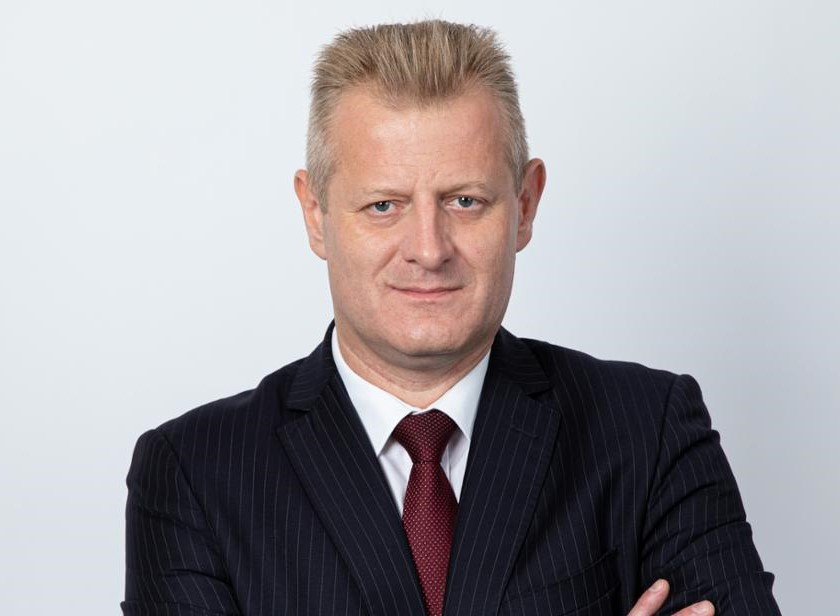

Poland Ambassador to Palestinian National Authority
- In office 1 August 2019 – 2024
- Appointed by: Andrzej Duda
- President: Mahmoud Abbas
- Preceded by: Aleksandra Bukowska-McCabe
- Succeeded by: Wiesław Kuceł

Poland Ambassador to North Macedonia
- In office 2011–2013
- Appointed by: Bronisław Komorowski
- President: Gjorge Ivanov
- Preceded by: Karol Bachura
- Succeeded by: Jacek Multanowski

Personal details
- Born: 11 October 1972 (age 53) Warsaw
- Children: 2
- Education: University of Warsaw
- Profession: Diplomat

Przemysław Ryszard Czyż (born 11 October 1972, in Warsaw) is a Polish diplomat, an ambassador to Macedonia (2011–2013) and Representative to the Palestinian National Authority (2019–2024).

== Life ==
Czyż has graduated from University of Warsaw, Law Faculty. In 1996, he joined the Ministry of Foreign Affairs of Poland, specializing in legal and legislative issues. In 2003, he became member of civil service. Between 2006 and 2009 he has been director of the MFA Director General's Office. Afterwards, he was the director of the Legal and Public Procurement Office. From 2011 to 2013 he has been Poland ambassador to Macedonia. From 2014 to 2016 he was Senior Fellow and Deputy Head of the Center for Polish-Russian Dialogue and Understanding. Between 2016 and 2018 he was head of the Bureau for Infrastructure. From 1 August 2019 to 2024 he served as a Representative of Poland to the Palestinian National Authority.

He is married, with two children. Besides Polish, he speaks English and Russian.

== Honours ==
- Star of Friendship Order of President Mahmoud Abbas (Palestine, 2024)
