= Leszek Włodzimierz Biały =

Polish politician

Leszek Włodzimierz Biały Ph.D.
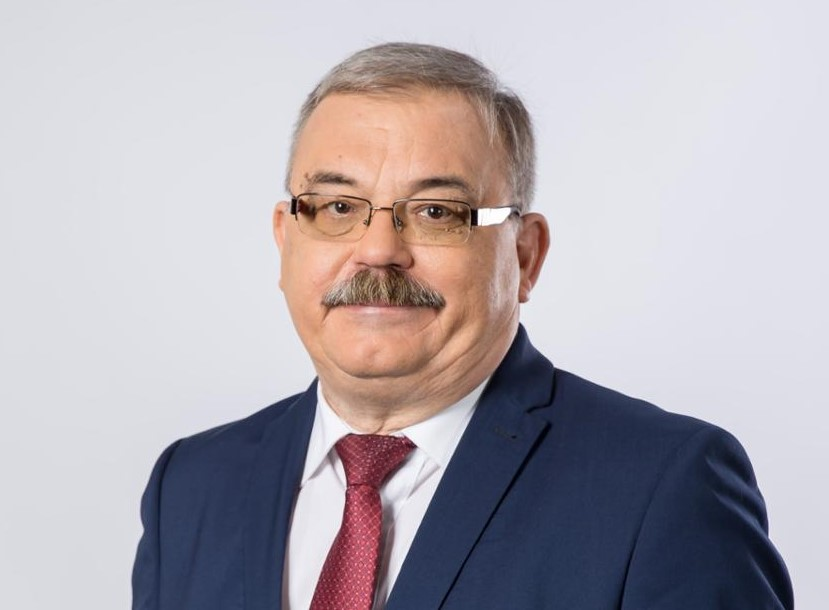

Poland Ambassador to Panama
- In office 2017 – 31 December 2023
- Preceded by: Marek Makowski
- Succeeded by: Jolanta Janek

Personal details
- Born: 28 March 1954 (age 72) Bydgoszcz, Poland
- Education: University of Warsaw
- Profession: Writer, translator, diplomat, lecturer

Leszek Włodzimierz Biały (born 28 March 1954 in Bydgoszcz) is a Polish writer, translator, and diplomat; between 2017 and 2023 he was serving as an ambassador to Panama.

== Life ==
=== Education ===
Leszek Włodzimierz Biały was born on 28 March 1954 in Bydgoszcz, and grew up in Płock, where he finished high school. Between 1973 and 1980 he studied Hispanism and history of art at the University of Warsaw. In 1997 he became a Doctor of Philosophy, defending a thesis on Pedro Calderón de la Barca.

In addition to native Polish, he speaks English and Spanish languages.

=== Career ===
After graduating, until 1986, he was a lecturer of art and history of Spain at the University of Warsaw Institute of Iberian and Ibero-American Studies. In 1986 he started working for the New Theater in Warsaw as a script translator. He was a Solidarity member at that time.

In 1990 he began his career at the diplomatic service. Between 1990 and 1994 he was working at the embassy in Madrid, as a I secretary responsible for cultural and scientific relations. Between 1998 and 2003 he was working in Madrid again, this time as a deputy ambassador. While working at the MFA in Warsaw, he was in charge of relations with Spanish and Portuguese-speaking countries.

From 2013 to 2017 he was deputy director of the Polish Institute in Bucharest. In August 2017 he was nominated as a Poland ambassador to Panama. He presented his credentials to the president Juan Carlos Varela on 24 October 2017. He was accredited to Belize, Dominican Republic, El Salvador, Guatemala, Haiti, Honduras, and Nicaragua as well. He ended his term on 31 December 2023.

=== Writer and translator ===
Leszek Włodzimierz Biały is also a writer and translator. He debuted in 1986 with translation of The Great Theater of the World by Pedro Calderón de la Barca. Several of his translations have been adapted as scripts by such directors as Tadeusz Kwinta and Tadeusz Słobodzianek.

He is a member of the Polish Writers' Association. In 2010 his novel Źródło Mamerkusa was awarded with Warsaw Literary Premiere Award – a title of the book of 2010.

== Works ==
Translations

- "Zwodziciel z Sewilli" Tirsa de Moliny i "Don Juan" Moliera, Warszawa: Wydawnictwo Uniwersytetu Warszawskiego, 1985.
- Pedro Calderón de la Barca, Książę Niezłomny, Warszawa: Wydawnictwo Literackie, 1989.
- Pedro Calderón de la Barca, Autos sacramentales, Wrocław; Warszawa; Kraków: Zakład Narodowy im. Ossolińskich, 1997.
- Tirso de Molina, Dramaty, 1999.

Books

- Dzieje Inkwizycji Hiszpańskiej, Warszawa: Książka i Wiedza, 1989.
- Źródło Mamerkusa, Warszawa: Wydawnictwo Nowy Świat, 2010.
- Czarny huzar, Gdynia: Novae Res, 2017.
