= Tomasz Czyszek =

Polish diplomat

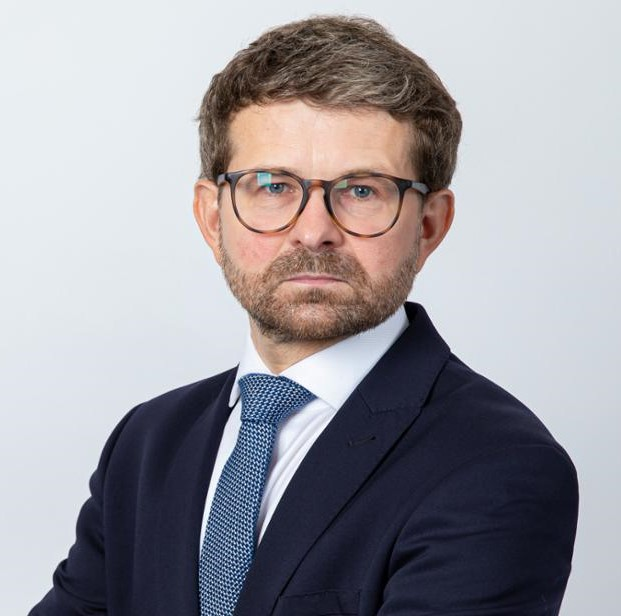

2nd Poland Ambassador to Malta
- In office February 2020 – July 2025
- Preceded by: Jolanta Janek
- Succeeded by: Małgorzata Kopeć

Personal details
- Born: November 21, 1974 (age 51) Kielce, Poland
- Children: 2 daughters
- Education: Jagiellonian University
- Profession: Diplomat

Tomasz Czyszek (born 21 November 1974 in Kielce) is a Polish diplomat, from 2020 to 2025 serving as an ambassador to Malta.

== Life ==
Tomasz Czyszek was born on 21 November 1974 in Kielce. He has graduated from political sciences at the Jagiellonian University (2000). He studied also at the Faculty of Social Sciences at the Pontifical University of Saint Thomas Aquinas in Rome (1997/1998), as well as European integration at the National School of Public Administration (2001/2002).

From 2000 to 2001, he worked for the Chancellery of the Prime Minister of Poland at the Office of the Government Plenipotentiary for Negotiations of the Republic of Poland's EU Membership. In 2002, he joined the Ministry of Foreign Affairs, Department of the European Union and Accession Negotiations Servicing. Between 2004 and 2009, he was serving at the Embassy in Rome, being responsible for political relations. Following post at the MFA Department of Western and Northern Europe (2009–2010), he worked at the European Policy Department (2010–2012). In 2012, he became deputy director, and in 2016 director of the MFA Bureau of Archives and Information Management. On 19 June 2019 Czyszek was appointed Polish ambassador to Malta He began his term in February 2020, presenting letter of credence to the president George Vella on 27 February 2020. He ended his mission in July 2025.

Besides Polish, he speaks English, Spanish and French languages. He is married, with two daughters.
