= Andrzej Świeżaczyński =

Polish politician

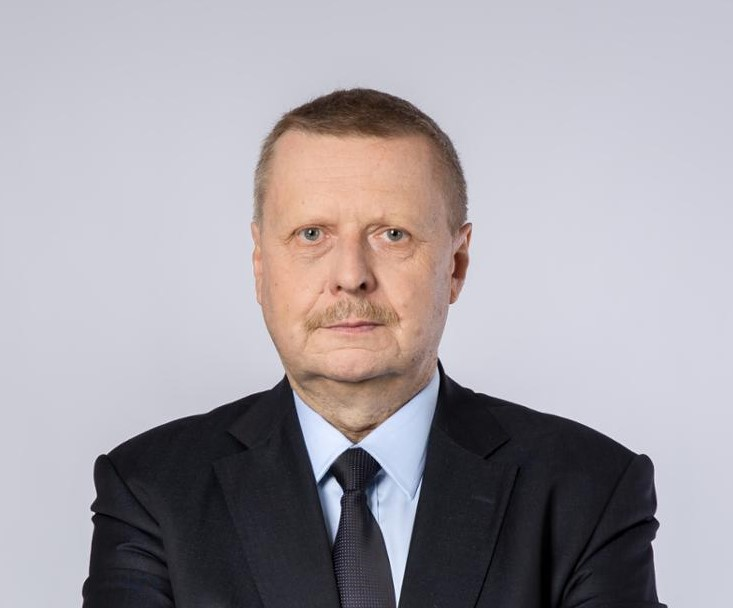

Poland Ambassador to Jordan
- In office 23 September 2016 – 30 September 2020
- Preceded by: Krzysztof Bojko
- Succeeded by: Lucjan Karpiński

Personal details
- Born: 1 June 1957 (age 69) Warsaw
- Children: 2 sons
- Education: Warsaw School of Economics
- Profession: diplomat

Andrzej Świeżaczyński (born 1 June 1957, Warsaw) is a Polish diplomat, ambassador to Jordan (2016–2020).

== Life ==
Andrzej Świeżaczyński has finished the Warsaw School of Economics.

He began his professional career in 1984 in Bumar-Labedy where, among others, he was the director of the company office in Belgrade. Between 1995 and 1999 he the Ministry of Economy commercial attaché in Tehran. Next four years he served as First Secretetary of the Poland Embassy in Tehran. Between 2004 and 2006 he worked for the Ministry of Economy. In 2006 he joined the Ministry of Foreign Affairs and became the deputy director of the Department of Africa and the Middle East. From 2009 to 2013 he was at the Embassy in Belgrade. In 2013 he was back at the Department of Africa and the Middle East.

On 23 September 2016 he was appointed Poland Ambassador to Jordan. He presented his credentials the king Abdullah II of Jordan on 7 December 2016. As an ambassador he is, among others, engaged in cooperating with Polish archeologists. He ended his term on 30 September 2020.

He speaks fluent English, Croatian, Serbian, Russian, and basic Persian. He is married, with two sons.
