= Paweł Woźny =

Polish politician

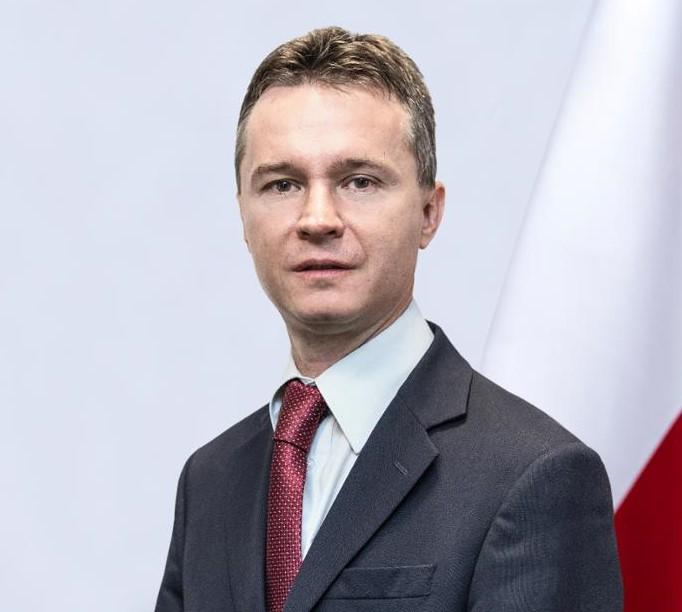

Poland Ambassador to Colombia
- In office 18 November 2020 – July 2024
- Preceded by: Agnieszka Frydrychowicz-Tekieli
- Succeeded by: Barbara Sośnicka

Personal details
- Born: 5 April 1971 (age 55) Kraków, Poland
- Parent(s): Elżbieta, Zenon
- Education: University of Warsaw
- Profession: Diplomat, politician

Paweł Jacek Woźny (born 5 April 1971) is a Polish diplomat. In 2020–2024, he was an ambassador to Colombia.

== Life ==
Paweł Woźny was born on 5 April 1971 in Kraków. He earned his master's degree from economics and Hispanic studies at the University of Warsaw. He was also educated at the Diplomatic Academy in Madrid and El Colegio de México.

In 1997, he began his career at the Polish diplomatic service, specializing in relations with Latin American countries. Between 2001 and 2006 he was Second Secretary for political, economic, cultural and media relations at the Embassy in Caracas, Venezuela. From 2007 to 2010 he was serving at the Embassy in Bogotá, Colombia, being responsible for economic affairs. In 2012, he was sent to Mexico City in position of the head of political-economic unit. From February to August 2018 he was running the Embassy as chargé d'affaires. In 2018, he returned to Warsaw. Next year, he became Under Secretary of State at the Ministry of National Defence being in charge of international cooperation. In July 2020, he was nominated Poland ambassador to Colombia, accredited also to Saint Lucia and Antigua and Barbuda. He presented copies of his credentials on 18 November 2020. He ended his mission in July 2024.
