= Krzysztof Dębnicki =

Polish politician (born 1950)

Krzysztof Dębnicki Ph.D.
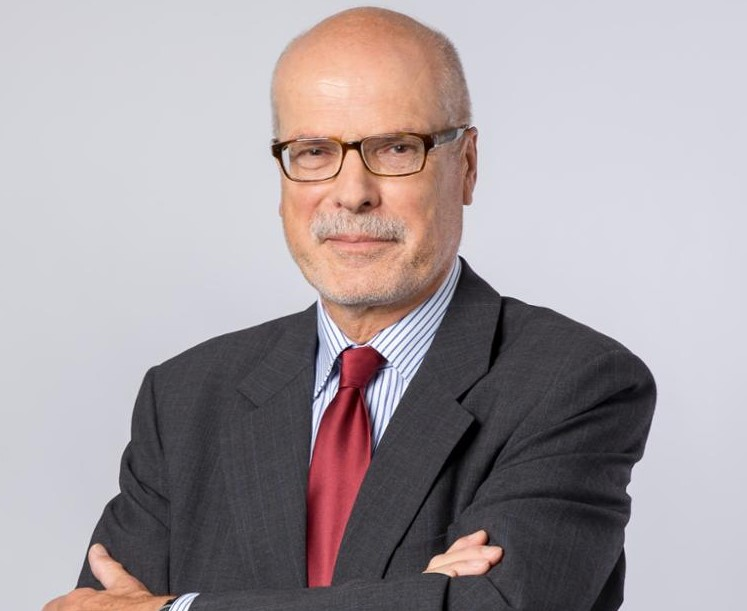

Poland Ambassador to Mongolia
- In office 2001–2005
- Preceded by: Stanisław Godziński
- Succeeded by: Zbigniew Kulak

Poland Ambassador to Pakistan
- In office 2007 – 1 September 2010
- Preceded by: Bogdan Marczewski
- Succeeded by: Andrzej Ananicz

Poland Ambassador to Malaysia
- In office September 2018 – 31 May 2023
- Preceded by: Marcin Kubiak
- Succeeded by: Krzysztof Dobrowolski

Personal details
- Born: 31 January 1950 (age 76) Warsaw, Poland
- Spouse: Ewa Małgorzata Gotz-Dębnicka
- Education: University of Warsaw
- Profession: Diplomat

Krzysztof Dębnicki (born 31 January 1950 in Warsaw, Poland) is a Polish scientist and diplomat serving as a Poland ambassador to Malaysia (2018–2023), Pakistan (2007–2010) and Mongolia (2001–2005).

== Education ==
Krzysztof Dębnicki studied at the University of Ghana (1968–1970). He earned his Master's of Arts degree in history from the University of Warsaw. In 1984, he defended his Ph.D. thesis on political transitions in Nepal between 1950 and 1980. In 2008, he gained post-doctoral degree – habilitation – on political system of India.

Besides Polish, he speaks Russian and English languages.

== Scientific career ==
Dębnicki specializes in history and politics of Central Asia and South Asia. In 1975, he started working at the University of Warsaw Department of Oriental Studies. He conducted researches at the University of Delhi (1985/1986) and New York University (1990/1991). In the 1970s and 1980s, he carried out several road journeys to Central Asia, Pakistan, India, Nepal, Sittim, China (including Tibet and Xinjiang) and Mongolia.

Apart from scientific publications, he has been also publishing in newspapers, e.g. Gazeta Wyborcza, Rzeczpospolita, Tygodnik Powszechny, National Geographic, The Guardian.

== Diplomatic career ==
Dębicki joined the Polish diplomatic service in 1993 and became desk officer responsible for Iran and the Persian Gulf countries. In 1995, he was appointed Counselor in the Poland Embassy in New Delhi, managing Poland-India political relations. For nine months he was chargé d’affaires there. In 1999, he ended his term. He went back to Poland on motorbike, travelling though Central Asia and Russia. In 2001, following work for the Asia and Australia Department, he was nominated ambassador to Mongolia whose purpose was to reopen the embassy. He returned to Warsaw in 2005. For the next two years he worked as a lecturer at the University of Warsaw and Collegium Civitas. Between 2007 and 1 September 2010 he was an ambassador to Pakistan.

In January 2018, Dębicki was nominated Poland ambassador to Malaysia. He took the post in September. He presented his credentials to Sultan Nazrin Shah of Perak on 7 November 2018. He ended his term on 31 May 2023.

== Works ==
- Nepal, królestwo wśród chmur, Warszawa: Książka i Wiedza, 1981.
- Royalists and populists: evolution of the political system of Nepal 1950–1980, Warszawa: Wydawnictwa Uniwersytetu Warszawskiego, 1992.
- Współczesna historia Królestwa Nepalu, Warszawa: Wydawnictwo Akademickie Dialog, 2005.
- Konflikt i przemoc w systemie politycznym niepodległych Indii, Warszawa: Wydawnictwo Akademickie "Dialog", 2000, 2006.
