= Stanisław Pawlak =

Polish diplomat and international law scholar (born 1933)

Professor Stanisław Pawlak

Judge of the International Tribunal for the Law of the Sea
- In office 1 October 2005 – 30 September 2023

Poland Ambassador to Syria
- In office 1996–2001
- Appointed by: Aleksander Kwaśniewski
- President: Hafez al-Assad; Bashar al-Assad
- Preceded by: Krzysztof Baliński
- Succeeded by: Jacek Chodorowicz

Poland Ambassador to the United Nations
- In office 1989–1991
- Appointed by: Wojciech Jaruzelski
- Secretary-General: Javier Pérez de Cuéllar
- Preceded by: Eugeniusz Noworyta
- Succeeded by: Robert Mroziewicz

Poland Ambassador to Canada
- In office 1978–1983
- Appointed by: Henryk Jabłoński
- Governor General: Jules Léger; Edward Schreyer
- Preceded by: Józef Czesak
- Succeeded by: Alojzy Bartoszek

Personal details
- Born: 27 September 1933 (age 93) Kalisz, Poland
- Education: University of Warsaw
- Profession: Diplomat, international law scholar, international judge
- Awards: Commander's Cross of the Order of Polonia Restituta Officer's Cross of the Order of Polonia Restituta Gold Cross of Merit

Stanisław Michał Pawlak (born 27 September 1933, Kalisz) is a Polish international law scholar and diplomat, ambassador of Poland to Canada (1978–1983), Syria (1996–2001), permanent representative to the United Nations (1989–1991), and judge of the International Tribunal for the Law of the Sea (2005–2023).

== Education and scientific career ==
Stanisław Pawlak grew up in Kalisz where he finished high school. In 1955, he graduated from law at the University of Warsaw. In 1967, he received doctoral degree, and in 1973, postdoctoral degree (habilitation). In 2002, he became full professor.

In 1974, he became a lecturer at the Institute of International Relations, University of Warsaw; since 2013, as emeritus. Visiting professor to several universities in the United States, Canada and Syria. Professor and Dean of the Faculty of Social Science and Administration at the Warsaw Academy of Computer Science and Administration (2005–2018). He has been specializing on international public law, international terrorism, protection of ethnic minorities in Europe, disarmament, international relations in Far East.

== Public career ==
Between 1955 and 2005 Pawlak was working for the Ministry of Foreign Affairs. He was member of Polish component of the Neutral Nations Supervisory Commission in Panmunjom, Korea (1956–1958), Attaché and Second Secretary at the embassy in Tokyo, Japan (1958–1963), deputy chief of the Polish delegation to the International Control Commission, Saigon, Vietnam (1965–1966); First Secretary at the embassy in Washington, the United States of America (1967–1970). From 1978 to 1983 Pawlak served as ambassador to Canada, from 1989 to 1991 he was permanent representative to the United Nations in New York. He was also ambassador to Syrian Arab Republic, additionally accredited to Hashemite Kingdom of Jordan (1996–2001). He was Polish Representative to the UN General Assembly (1973–1978, 1983–1990, 2002–2005), the Steering Committee for Human Rights, Council of Europe (1992–1995), as well. At the Ministry he was holding several important posts, e.g. deputy director of Minister's Office (1973–1975), director of the Department of International Organizations (1975–1978, 1986–1989), director of the Legal and Treaty Department (1983–1986). He headed several delegations: on delimiting Polish maritime boundary with East Germany or Soviet Union, among others. From 2001 to 2005 he was foreign policy advisor to the president Aleksander Kwaśniewski. Since 2002 Titular Ambassador.

He has been member of the Union of Polish Youth (1948–1955) and of the Polish United Workers' Party (1952–1990), the International Law Commission (1987–1991), Polish Legislative Council (1983–1989), Polish Institute of International Affairs Council (1983–1989), Commission on Law of the Sea, Polish Academy of Sciences.

On 1 October 2005 he became judge of the International Tribunal for the Law of the Sea. In 2014, he was chosen for another 9-year term. Since October 2017 President of the Chamber for Marine Environment Disputes Among cases he ruled was Philippines v. China (2016). He ended his term at the Tribunal on 30 September 2023.

== Honours ==
- Order of the Rising Sun, 3rd Class, Gold Rays with Neck Ribbon, Japan (2021)
- Commander of the Order of Polonia Restituta, Poland (2005)
- Officer of the Order of Polonia Restituta, Poland (1985)
- Gold Cross of Merit, Poland (1974)

== Selected works ==
- Okinawa, wyd. MON, Warszawa: Wydawnictwo MON, 1972, OCLC 839018079.
- Polityka Stanów Zjednoczonych wobec Chin 1941–1955, Warszawa: PWN, 1973, OCLC 839035355.
- Polityka Stanów Zjednoczonych wobec Chin 1956–1978, Warszawa: PWN, 1982, ISBN 8301031611.
- Ochrona mniejszości narodowych w Europie, Warszawa: SCHOLAR_{,} 2001, ISBN 83-88495-26-7.
- Publikacje i dokumenty z lat 1962–2012 : (wybór), Warszawa: Sowa, 2013, ISBN 9788364033216.
