= Adam Jelonek =

Polish academic and diplomat

Adam Wacław Jelonek Ph.D.
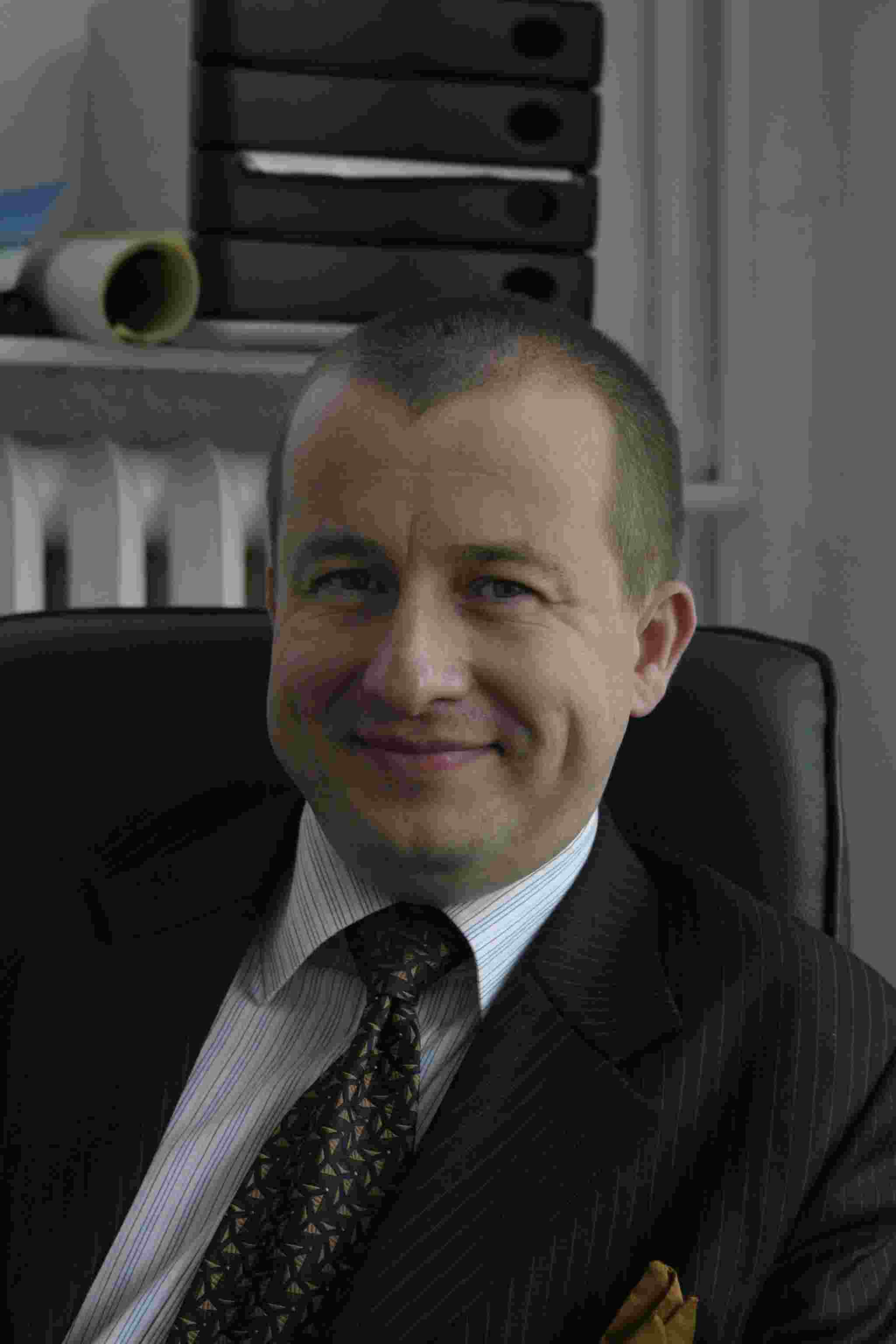

Ambassador of the Republic of Poland to Malaysia
- In office 2010–2014
- Preceded by: Eugeniusz Sawicki
- Succeeded by: Marcin Kubiak

Personal details
- Born: 14 September 1968 (age 58) Kraków, Poland
- Education: University of Warsaw
- Profession: Sociologist, political scientist

Adam Wacław Jelonek (born 14 September 1968) is a Polish diplomat, sociologist and political scientist. He is the former Polish ambassador to Malaysia, Brunei and the Philippines. He is a professor and head of department in the Department of Middle and Far East at the Jagiellonian University in Kraków.

== Early life and education ==
Jelonek was born in Kraków. He is a graduate of the Faculty of Journalism and Political Science at the University of Warsaw. In 1986, he became an underground activist for the Federation of Fighting Youth. He received a Ph.D. in humanities from the Institute of Sociology at the University of Warsaw in 1997, and habilitation at the Faculty of Philosophy and Sociology in 2005.

== Academic career ==
Between 1993 and 2006, Jelonek was an assistant and associate professor at the Institute of Sociology in the University of Warsaw. Between 1999 and 2005, he was an associate professor at the Institute of Political Studies at the Polish Academy of Sciences. He has been head of department in the Department of Middle and Far East at the Faculty of International and Political Studies at the Jagiellonian University since 2007 – and under his leadership, the department became an institute. Between 2007 and 2009, he was Chairman of the Scientific Council of the Institute of Regional Studies at the Jagiellonian University. He is the director of the Institute of the Middle and Far East of the Jagiellonian University.

== Ambassadorial career ==
In 2010 Jelonek became Ambassador Extraordinary and Plenipotentiary of the Republic of Poland to Malaysia, accredited to Brunei and the Philippines. He ended his term in 2014.

== Books and papers ==
Jelonek has written a number of books and papers, including:

- Kibbutz. Is this a crisis of the collectivist socialism? (Warsaw 1994)
- Revolution of the Khmer Rouges 1975–1979 (Warsaw 1998)
- Theories of social development (Warsaw 2001)
- Towards illiberal democracy (Warsaw 2002)
- Dilemmas of consociationalism. The case of Malaysia (Warsaw 2004)
- Vietnamese-The Values Systems- Stereotypes of the West (Warsaw 2004)
- Individual and society on Asia (ed.) (Toruń 2007)
- Confucianism. China Towards the New Century (ed. with. B. Zemanek) (Kraków 2008)
- History of Cambodia (Warsaw 2008)
- History of Malaysia (with E. Trojnar, Warsaw 2009)
- State and Ethnic Minorities in Southeast Asia (Kraków 2009)
