= Lucjan Karpiński =

Polish diplomat

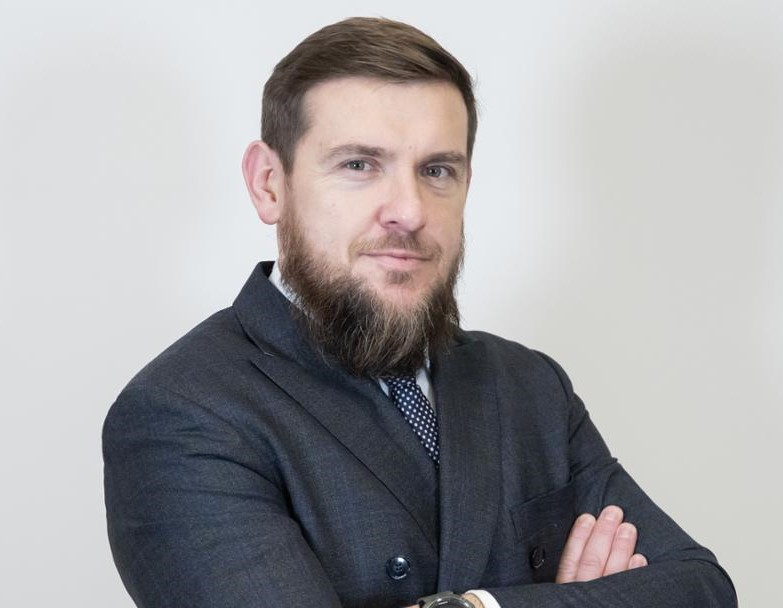

Poland Ambassador to Jordan
- In office 15 February 2021 – 2025
- Preceded by: Andrzej Świeżaczyński

Personal details
- Profession: diplomat

Lucjan Karpiński is a Polish diplomat who serves as ambassador to Jordan (2021–2025).

== Life ==
Karpiński joined the Ministry of Foreign Affairs in 2008. He was responsible for the evacuation of Polish citizens from the places at risk of conflicts and in difficult situations abroad (e.g., whose travel agencies went bankrupt).

In 2010, he was posted at the Embassy in Abu Dhabi, in charge of economic and consular relations. At the Ministry he served the deputy director of the Consular Department and the Inspectorate of the Foreign Service (2018).

On 27 November 2020 he was appointed Poland Ambassador to Jordan. He began his term on 15 February 2021 and presented copies of his credentials the on 7 March 2021. He ended his mission in 2025.
