= List of ambassadors to Poland =

This is a list of ambassadors to Poland. Note that some ambassadors are responsible for more than one country while others are directly accredited to Warsaw.

== Current Foreign Ambassadors to Poland ==
Sending country	Presentation of the credentials	Location of resident embassy	Ambassador
Afghanistan	2014	Warsaw, Poland	Abdul Hai Haider (Chargé d’Affaires a.i.)
Albania	7 March 2024	Warsaw, Poland	Mimoza Halimi
Algeria	7 December 2023	Warsaw, Poland	Mohamed Salah Eddine Belaid
Andorra	2 July 2025	Andorra la Vella, Andorra	Ms. Elisenda Vives Balmana
Angola	10 October 2022	Warsaw, Poland	Manuel Pedro Chaves
Argentina	October 2025	Warsaw, Poland	María Clara Vidal (Chargé d'Affaires a.i.)
Armenia	26 October 2023	Warsaw, Poland	Alexander Arzoumanian
Australia	7 March 2024	Warsaw, Poland	Benjamin Hayes
Austria	13 October 2025	Warsaw, Poland	Hannes Schreiber
Azerbaijan	8 January 2021	Warsaw, Poland	Nargiz Gurbanova
Bahrain	20 March 2019	Berlin, Germany	Abdulla Abdullatif Abdulla
Bangladesh	June 22, 2015	Warsaw, Poland	Kazi Muntashir Murshed (Chargé d’Affaires a.i.)
Barbados	not accredited	London, UK	
Belarus	N.D.	Warsaw, Poland	Mikita Hrynchyk
Belgium	15 September 2022	Warsaw, Poland	Rik Van Droogenbroeck
Benin		Moscow, Russia	vacant
Bolivia	23 March 2023	Berlin, Germany	Wilfredo Bernardo Ticona Cuba
Bosnia and Herzegovina	11 July 2019	Warsaw, Poland	Koviljka Špirić
Botswana	18 October 2019	Stockholm, Sweden	Mmasekgoa Gabaipone Masire Mwamba
Brazil	12 July 2022	Warsaw, Poland	Haroldo de Macedo Ribeiro
Brunei	08 December 2022	Berlin, Germany	Pengiran Hajah Krtini Pengiran Haji Tahir
Bulgaria	19 May 2021	Warsaw, Poland	Margarita Ganeva Ganeva
Burkina Faso	1 July 2024	Berlin, Germany	Toro Justin Ouoro
Burundi		Moscow, Russia	Maj. Gen. Joseph Nkurunziza
Cambodia	2 February 2010	Berlin, Germany	Widhya Chem
Cameroon		Moscow, Russia	vacant
Canada	20 March 2013	Warsaw, Poland	Alexandra Bugailiskis
Cape Verde	1 September 2010	Berlin, Germany	Estevão Tavares Vaz (Chargé d’Affaires a.i.)
Chad		Moscow, Russia	vacant
Chile	22 July 2008	Warsaw, Poland	José Manuel Silva Vidaurre
China	9 October 2012	Warsaw, Poland	Xu Jian
Colombia	9 November 2011	Warsaw, Poland	Victoria González Ariza
Congo		Berlin, Germany	vacant
Côte d'Ivoire	25 January 2010	Warsaw, Poland	Houadia Léon Adom Kacou
Croatia	12 January 2009	Warsaw, Poland	Ivan Del Vechio
Cuba	11 January 2012	Warsaw, Poland	Juan Dagoberto Castro Martinez
Cyprus	11 April 2012	Warsaw, Poland	Andreas Zenonos
Czech Republic	22 July 2008	Warsaw, Poland	Jan Sechter
Democratic Republic of Congo	7 August 2008	Warsaw, Poland	Philippe Elifa Abombo (Chargé d’Affaires a.i.)
Denmark	9 October 2012	Warsaw, Poland	Steen Hommel
Dominican Republic	20 January 2011	Brussels, Belgium	Alejandro González Pons
Ecuador	24 February 2010	Warsaw, Poland	Fabián Valdivieso Eguiguren
Egypt	3 November 2011	Warsaw, Poland	Reda Abdelrahman Bebars
El Salvador	30 May 2011	Berlin, Germany	Anita Cristina Escher Echeverria
Eritrea	3 November 2005	Berlin, Niemcy	Petros Tseggai Asghedom
Estonia	9 October 2009	Warsaw, Poland	Taavi Toom
Equatorial Guinea	27 February 2009	Paris, France	Cándido Muatetema Rivas
Ethiopia	17 January 2012	Berlin, Germany	Fesseha Asghedom Tessema
Finland	9 October 2012	Warsaw, Poland	Jari Pekka Olavi Vilen
France	29 June 2012	Warsaw, Poland	Pierre Buhler
Gabon	22 June 1995	Libreville, Gabon	Albert Akendengué
Gambia	4 March 2010	Brussels, Belgium	Mamour Jagne
Georgia	29 April 2011	Warsaw, Poland	Nikoloz Nikolozishvili
Germany	7 September 2010	Warsaw, Poland	Rüdiger Freiherr von Fritsch
Ghana		Berlin, Germany	Grant Ohemeng Kesse (Ambassador agréé)
Greece	8 November 2012	Warsaw, Poland	Tasia Athanasiou
Guatemala		Berlin, Germany	Carlos Jimenez Licona (Ambassador agreé)
Guinea		Berlin, Germany	Alexander Cécé Loua (Ambassador agreé)
Guinea-Bissau		Moscow, Germany	vacant
Guyana		London, UK	Laleshwar K. N. Singh (Ambassador agréé)
Haiti		Berlin, Germany	vacant
Holy See	15 September 2010	Warsaw, Poland	Celestino Migliore
Honduras	30 May 2011	Berlin, Germany	Efrain Anibal Diaz Arrivillaga
Hungary	9 October 2012	Warsaw, Poland	Iván Gyurcsík
Iceland	20 January 2011	Berlin, Germany	Gunnar Snorri Gunnarson
India	19 September 2011	Warsaw, Poland	Monika Kapil Mohta
Indonesia	27 October 2010	Warsaw, Poland	Darmansjah Djumala
Iran	6 October 2010	Warsaw, Poland	Samad Ali Lakizadeh
Iraq	27 August 2010	Warsaw, Poland	Saad A.W. Jawad Kindeel
Ireland	3 March 2015	Warsaw, Poland	Gerard Keown
Israel	27 April 2009	Warsaw, Poland	Zvi Rav-Ner
Italy	11 January 2012	Warsaw, Poland	Riccardo Guariglia
Jamaica	27 February 2009	Berlin, Germany	Joy Elfredy Wheeler
Japan	9 November 2011	Warsaw, Poland	Makoto Yamanaka
Jordan	not known	Berlin, Germany	Hamzeh Mahmoud Yousef Al-Omari (Chargé d`affaires a. i.)
Kazakhstan	5 March 2020	Warsaw, Poland	Alim Kirabayev
Kenya	30 May 2011	Rome, Italy	Josephine Wangari Gaita
Kosovo	19 December 2023	Warsaw, Poland	Drilon S. Gashi (Chief of Mission of Consulate General of Kosova in Warsaw)
Kuwait	22 December 2010	Warsaw, Poland	Adel Mohammed A.H. Hayat
Kyrgyzstan	6 March 2007	Vienna, Austria	Lidia Adamkałyjewna Imanalieva
Laos		Berlin, Germany	vacant
Latvia	15 September 2009	Warsaw, Poland	Einars Semanis
Lebanon	24 October 2012	Warsaw, Poland	Sonia Abou Azar (Chargé d’affaires a. i.)
Lesotho		Berlin, Germany	Matlotliso Lineo Lydia Khechane-Ntoane
Libya	26 April 2012	Warsaw, Poland	Seham Y. A. Al-Shmakhi (Chargé d’affaires a. i.)
Liechtenstein		Bern, Switzerland	vacant
Lithuania	22 December 2010	Warsaw, Poland	Loreta Zakarevičiene
Luxembourg	27 October 2010	Warsaw, Poland	Conrad Bruch
Madagascar	19 May 2005	Moscow, Russia	Eloi A. Maxime Dovo
Malawi	2 February 2010	Berlin, Germany	Isaac Chikwekwere Lamba
Malaysia	27 August 2012	Warsaw, Poland	Jamaluddin bin Sabeh
Mali		Berlin, Germany	vacant
Malta	27 August 2010	Warsaw, Poland	Godwin Montanaro
Mauritania		Moscow, Russia	Bebe Ould Mohamed M'Bareck (Ambassador agréé)
Mexico	11 April 2012	Warsaw, Poland	Ricardo Villanueva Hallal
Moldova	30 August 2010	Warsaw, Poland	Iurie Bodrug
Monaco	22 April 2008	Berlin, Germany	Claude Giordan
Mongolia	29 June 2012	Warsaw, Poland	Adiya Ganbaatar
Montenegro	29 June 2012	Warsaw, Poland	Ramiz Bašić
Morocco	16 January 2009	Warsaw, Poland	Moha Tagma
Myanmar	23 May 2006	Berlin, Germany	U Tin Win
Namibia	26 January 2010	Berlin, Germany	Neville Melvin Gertze
Nepal	17 January 2011	Berlin, Germany	Suresh Prasad Pradhan
Netherlands	9 October 2009	Warsaw, Poland	Marcel Kurpershoek
New Zealand	2 September 2011	Warsaw, Poland	Nicholas Kiddle (Chargé d’affaires a. i.)
Nicaragua		Berlin, Germany	Alvaro Montenegro Mallona (Ambassador agréé)
Niger	not accredited	Berlin, Germany	Illiassou Ali (Chargé d’Affaires a.i.)
Nigeria	27 August 2012	Warsaw, Poland	Samuel Wodi Jimba
North Korea	17 November 1998	Warsaw, Poland	Kim Pyong Il
North Macedonia	30 August 2010	Warsaw, Poland	Fatmir Xheladini
Norway	12 January 2009	Warsaw, Poland	Enok Nygaard
Oman	17 January 2012	Berlin, Germany	Zainab Ali Said Al-Qasmiah
Pakistan	6 October 2010	Warsaw, Poland	Murad Ali
Palestinian Authority	11 January 2012	Warsaw, Poland	Azmi Al-Daqqa
Panama	11 April 2012	Warsaw, Poland	Luis Alberto Madrid Caballero
Papua New Guinea		London, UK	vacant
Paraguay	17 January 2012	Berlin, Germany	Raúl Florentin Antola
Peru	15 September 2009	Warsaw, Poland	Martha Isabel Chavarri Dupuy
Philippines	13 October 2025	Warsaw, Poland	Alan L. Deniega
Portugal	11 December 2006	Warsaw, Poland	José Duarte Sequeira e Serpa
Qatar	29 December 2009	Moscow, Russia	Hadi Nasser Mansour Khalil Al-Hajri
Romania	18 June 2012	Warsaw, Poland	Laurentiu Pinte (Chargé d’Affaires a.i.)
Russia	7 September 2010	Warsaw, Poland	Aleksandr Alekseev
Rwanda	17 January 2012	Moscow, Russia	Christine Nkulikiynka
Saint Vincent and the Grenadines	not accredited	New York City, US	Camillo M. Gonsalves
San Marino	17 January 2012	Athens, Greece	Victor Restis
Saudi Arabia	27 October 2010	Warsaw, Poland	Waleed Bin Taher Bin Hassan Radwan
Senegal		Berlin, Germany	vacant
Serbia	27 April 2009	Warsaw, Poland	Radojko Bogojević
Sierra Leone		Moscow, Russia	vacant
Singapore	4 March 2010	Singapore, Singapore	Kwee Liong Keng
Slovakia	29 April 2011	Warsaw, Poland	Vasil Grivna
Slovenia	31 July 2009	Warsaw, Poland	Marjan Šetinc
South Africa	29 April 2011	Warsaw, Poland	Lehlohonolo Shadrack Ted Pekane
South Korea	22 April 2012	Warsaw, Poland	Young-sun Paek
Sovereign Military Order of Malta	22 June 2004	Warsaw, Poland	Vincenzo Antonio Manno
Spain	8 November 2012	Warsaw, Poland	Agustín Núñez Martínez
Sri Lanka	13 January 2010	Warsaw, Poland	Pamela Jayasekera Deen
Sudan		Berlin, Germany	vacant
Sweden	19 September 2011	Warsaw, Poland	Staffan Herrström
Switzerland	9 November 2011	Warsaw, Poland	Lukas Beglinger
Syria	4 September 2007	Warsaw, Poland	Wissal Issa (Chargé d’Affaires a.i.)
Tajikistan	20 January 2011	Berlin, Germany	Imomudin Mirzoyevich Sattorov
Tanzania	2 February 2010	Berlin, Germany	Ahmada Rweyemamu Ngemera
Thailand	11 April 2012	Warsaw, Poland	Bansarn Bunnag
East Timor		Brussels, Belgium	vacant
Togo		Berlin, Germany	vacant
Tunisia	13 December 2012	Warsaw, Poland	Slim Ben Jaâfar
Turkey	27 August 2012	Warsaw, Poland	Yusuf Ziya Özcan
Uganda		Berlin, Germany	vacant
Ukraine	7 September 2010	Warsaw, Poland	Markiyan Malskyy
United Arab Emirates	27 April 2009	Warsaw, Poland	Asim Mirza Ali Mohammed Al Rahma
United Kingdom	5 April 2016	Warsaw, Poland	Melinda Simmons
United States	7 October 2025	Warsaw, Poland	Thomas Rose
Uruguay	9 October 2012	Warsaw, Poland	Carlos Brugnini García Lagos
Uzbekistan	26 April 2011	Warsaw, Poland	Ikrom Nazarov (Chargé d’Affaires a. i.)
Venezuela	28 June 2009	Warsaw, Poland	Jesús Miguel Cruz Guevara (Chargé d´Affaires a.i.)
Vietnam	15 September 2020	Warsaw, Poland	Nguyen Hung
Yemen	12 January 2009	Warsaw, Poland	Ali Ali Abdulaziz Aqlan
Zambia		Berlin, Germany	Godwin Kingsley Chinkuli (Ambassador agréé)
Zimbabwe	17 January 2012	Berlin, Germany	Hebson Makuvise

== See also ==
- List of current ambassadors from Poland
