= Michał Łabenda =

Polish diplomat

Michał R. Łabenda Ph.D.
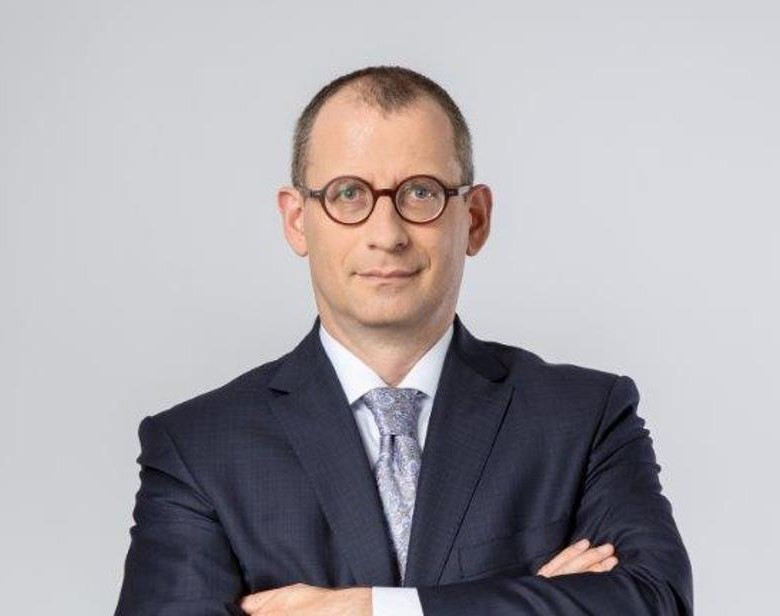

3rd Poland Ambassador to Azerbaijan
- In office 2010–2014
- Preceded by: Krzysztof Krajewski
- Succeeded by: Marek Całka

Poland Ambassador to Mongolia
- In office 7 July 2015 – 2018
- Preceded by: Zbigniew Kulak
- Succeeded by: Krzysztof Bojko

Poland Ambassador to Egypt
- In office October 2018 – 18 August 2023
- Preceded by: Michał Murkociński
- Succeeded by: Michał Murkociński

Personal details
- Born: 10 September 1974 (age 52) Wrocław, Poland
- Education: Al-Farabi Kazakh National University
- Profession: diplomat; orientalist; university teacher

Michał Rafał Łabenda (born 10 September 1974) is a Polish diplomat, serving as Polish ambassador to Egypt (2018–2023), Mongolia (2015–2018), Azerbaijan (2010–2014).

== Life ==
He holds an M.A. in Arab studies (Al-Farabi Kazakh National University, 1999). In 2006, Łabenda defended at the University of Warsaw, Institute of Oriental Studies his Ph.D. thesis on Muslim movements in the Fergana Valley. His doctoral supervisor was Anna Parzymies.

Łabenda worked at the KARTA Center between 1998 and 1999. In 1999, he started his career at the Ministry of Foreign Affairs. From 2000 to 2001 he was an intern in Osaka. He has been Second Secretary at the Polish Embassy in Tashkent, Uzbekistan (2002–2005), deputy director of Eastern Department (2007–2010), ambassador of Poland to Azerbaijan (2010–2014), visiting ambassador of Poland to Mongolia (2015–2018) and, since October 2018, ambassador of Poland to Egypt, with accreditation to Sudan and Eritrea. He ended his term on 18 August 2023. Since September 2024, Łabenda is serving as Chargé d'affaires of Poland to Kazakhstan. He has been also lecturing at the University of Warsaw.

Łabenda is married and has a son Jan. He speaks English, German, Russian, Kazakh, Arabic, Uzbek, Azerbaijani and French.

== Works ==
- Język kazachski ["Kazakh language”], Dialog, Warszawa 2000, ISBN 83-88238-59-0
- Islam a terroryzm ["Islam and terrorism"], (ed. Anna Parzymies), Dialog, Warszawa 2003, ISBN 83-88938-44-4
- Muzułmanie w Europie ["Muslims in Europe"], (ed. Anna Parzymies), Dialog, Warszawa 2005, ISBN 83-89899-08-6
- Życie codzienne w Samarkandzie ["Everyday life in Samarkand"], (with Abdurasul Niyazov), Dialog, Warszawa 2007, ISBN 978-83-89899-69-9
- Dolina Fergańska w czasach islamu ["Fergana Valley during Islam times”], Dialog, Warszawa 2016, ISBN 978-83-8002-329-1
