= Rafał Poborski =

Polish diplomat

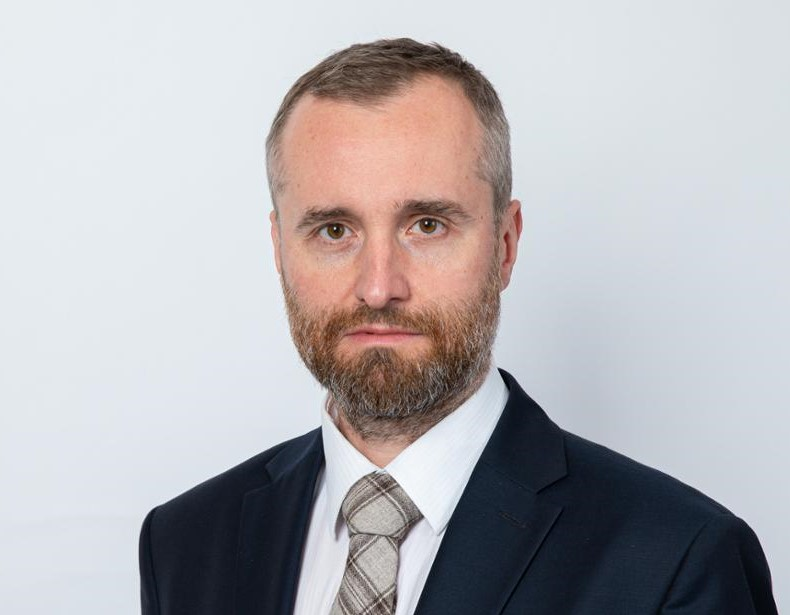

5th Polish Ambassador to Azerbaijan
- In office January 2020 – July 2024
- Preceded by: Marek Całka
- Succeeded by: Paweł Radomski

Personal details
- Born: February 6, 1976 (age 50) Warsaw, Polish People's Republic
- Education: University of Warsaw
- Profession: diplomat

Rafał Poborski (born 6 February 1976 in Warsaw) is a Polish diplomat who served as an ambassador of Poland to Azerbaijan from 2020 to 2024.

== Life ==
Rafał Poborski has been studying at the University of Warsaw Institute of Ethnology and Cultural Anthropology (2000) and University of Warsaw Centre for Eastern European Studies (2002). He has been also educated at the Swedish National Defence College, Stockholm (2008).

He began his professional career at the Polish Information Agency. Between 2000 and 2003 he was working for the Centre for Eastern Studies, Warsaw. In 2003 he entered the Ministry of Foreign Affairs of Poland. Between 2006 and 2008 he was seconded to a position of head of a unit at the Military Intelligence Service. From June to January 2007 he was member of a council of The Foundation Aid to Poles in the East. Between February 2010 and September 2014 he was serving as a political Counsellor and vice-consul at the embassy in Ljubljana. Later, he was responsible for relations with Baltic Sea states at the MFA Security Policy Department. In September 2015 he joined the Eastern Department, since February 2016 holding post of deputy director for Central Asia and the South Caucasus. On 19 June 2019 Poborski was appointed Polish ambassador to Azerbaijan, additionally accredited to Turkmenistan. He began his term in January 2020 and ended in July 2024. Next, he became head of the Unit for Relations with South-East Asia at the Asia-Pacific Department.

Besides Polish, he speaks English, Russian, and Spanish.

== Honours ==
- Silver Cross of Merit (Poland, 2019)
