= Agnieszka Frydrychowicz-Tekieli =

Polish politician

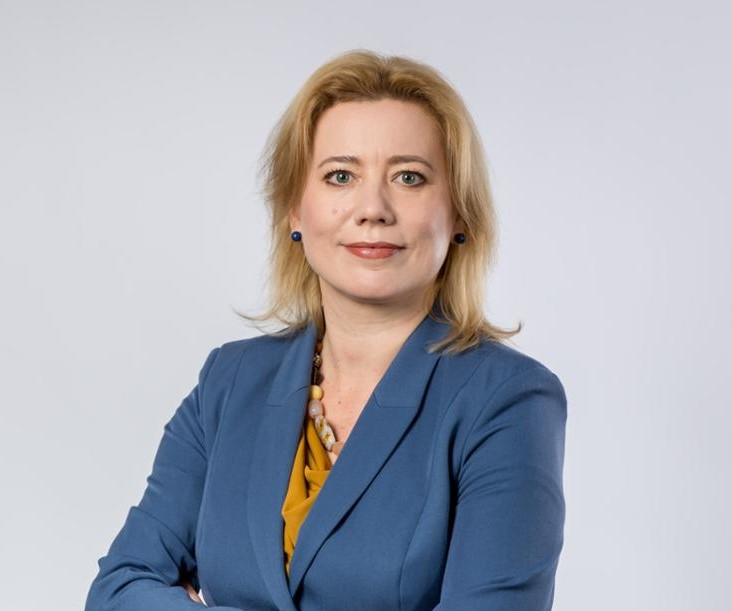

Poland Ambassador to Colombia
- In office September 2016 – 31 August 2020
- Preceded by: Maciej Ziętara
- Succeeded by: Paweł Woźny

Poland Ambassador to Mexico
- Incumbent
- Assumed office 2025
- Preceded by: Maciej Ziętara

Personal details
- Born: 1974 (age 51–52) Słupsk, Poland
- Children: one son
- Education: University of Warsaw
- Profession: Diplomat

Agnieszka Frydrychowicz-Tekieli (born 1974 in Słupsk) is a Polish diplomat, an ambassador to Colombia (2016–2020) and Mexico (since 2025).

== Life ==
Agnieszka Frydrychowicz-Tekieli was born in 1974 in Słupsk. In 1998 she has earned her master's degree from the University of Warsaw, Institute of International Relations. She was also educated at American Studies Center there. She is an author of articles on Argentina for Polish Scientific Publishers PWN encyclopedia.

In 1999 she began her career at the Polish diplomatic service. Following her post at the Department for European Union, between 2004 and 2009 she was First Secretary at the Permanent Representation of the Republic of Poland to the European Union in Brussels. In 2008 she became Minister's envoy for the Barcelona Process. In 2009 she was the head of the Maghreb and Mashriq section at the Ministry of Foreign Affairs. Between 2009 and 2014, she was in position of the deputy head of mission in Madrid, also as chargé d'affaires (2012–2013). For next two years she was the deputy director of the MFA Bureau of Infrastracture. On 2 September 2016 she was nominated Poland ambassador to Colombia. On 15 November 2016, she presented her credentials to the President of Colombia Juan Manuel Santos. She was also accredited to Saint Lucia and Antigua and Barbuda. She ended her term on 31 August 2020. Next, she worked at the MFA Department of Public and Cultural Diplomacy, as well as the Department of the Americas, where she was responsible for relations with Argentina, Brazil, Paraguay, and Uruguay. In November 2024, she took the post of Chargé d'affaires of the Embassy in Mexico City, accredited also to Costa Rica. In April 2025, she was nominated Ambassador.

She speaks English and Spanish languages. She is married, with a son.

== Honours ==
- 2021 – Grand Cross of the Order of San Carlos
