= Marek Całka =

Polish politician (born 1966)

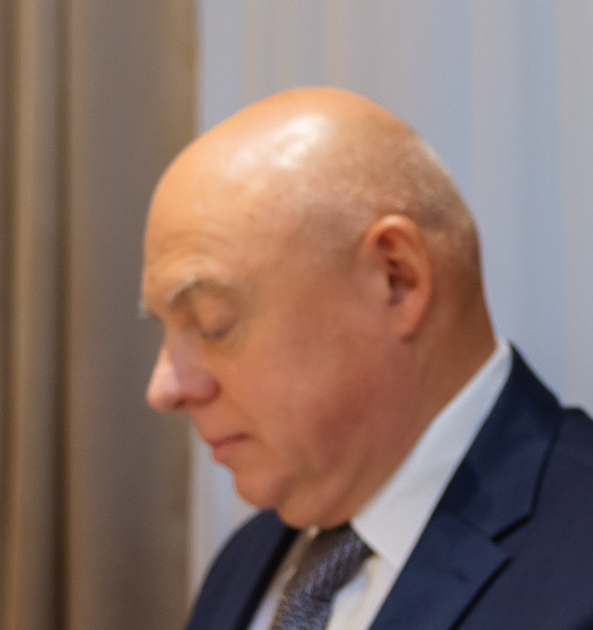
- Marek Całka (2024)

5th Poland Ambassador to South Korea
- In office 2007–2011
- Preceded by: Andrzej Derlatka
- Succeeded by: Krzysztof Majka

4th Poland Ambassador to Azerbaijan
- In office February 2015 – 2019
- Preceded by: Michał Łabenda
- Succeeded by: Rafał Poborski

Personal details
- Born: 2 January 1966 (age 60) Warsaw, Poland
- Children: one
- Education: University of Warsaw
- Profession: Diplomat

Marek Janusz Całka (born 2 January 1966 in Warsaw, Poland) is a Polish civil servant and career diplomat serving as a Poland ambassador to South Korea (2007–2011) and Azerbaijan (2015–2019).

== Life ==
=== Education ===
Marek Całka has graduated from history at the University of Warsaw in 1991.

Besides Polish, he speaks English, and Russian languages.

=== Diplomatic career ===
Following his work for the Centre for Eastern Studies (1992–1993), Całka joined the Polish diplomatic service in 1993. At the Ministry of Foreign Affairs in Warsaw he had been responsible mostly for the foreign policy planning, including on the position of the head of the Department of Urban Studies and Planning (1996–1998) and the Eastern Director deputy director (2010–2015). He served as counsellor at the embassies in Budapest (1999–2000) and Moscow (2000–2003). In 2006, he was an Assistant Secretary of State at Chancellery of the Prime Minister. In 2007, he became Poland Ambassador to South Korea. He ended his term in 2010. In December 2014, he was appointed Poland ambassador to Azerbaijan, he took the post in February 2015. He has been accredited also to Turkmenistan. Całka ended his term in 2019. That year he became director of the Department of Economic Cooperation.
