= Jolanta Janek =

Polish politician (born 1963)

Jolanta Janek Ph.D.
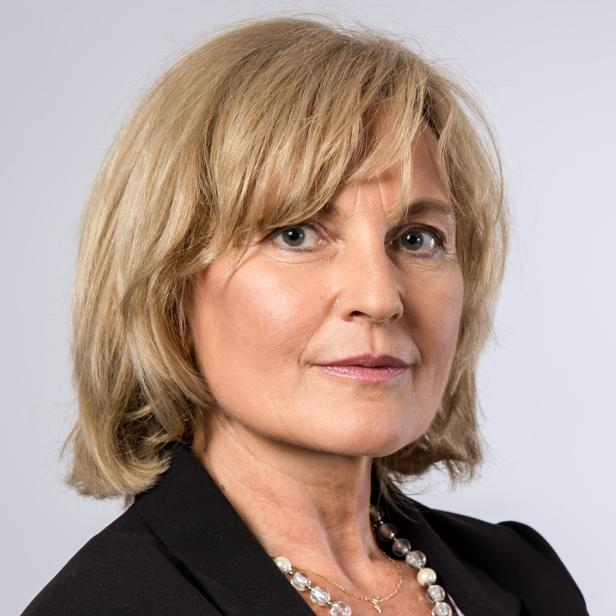
- Jolanta Janek (2024)

1st Poland Ambassador to Malta
- In office 1 December 2014 – March 2019
- Succeeded by: Tomasz Czyszek

Poland Ambassador to Panama
- Incumbent
- Assumed office 2025
- Preceded by: Leszek Włodzimierz Biały

Personal details
- Born: 12 February 1963 (age 63) Warsaw, Poland
- Education: Warsaw School of Economics
- Profession: Diplomat, economist

Jolanta Janek (born 12 February 1963) is a Polish diplomat, ambassador to Malta (2014–2019), and Panama (since 2025).

== Education ==
Jolanta Janek was born on 12 February 1963 in Warsaw. In 1986 she has earned her master's degree from the Warsaw School of Economics. She was also educated at University of Warsaw Faculty of Geography (1987–1989) and at the Danish School of Public Administration. In 1984 she defended her Ph.D. thesis on Italian economic miracle.

As researcher, she publishes mostly on the economics and society of Italy and Asian countries.

== Diplomatic career ==
In 1990, she began her career at the Polish diplomatic service. She started with working at the embassies in the Vatican City (until 1994). Following posts at the Diplomatic Protocol and Western Europe Department, between 1998 and 2002 she served at the embassy in Rome. She was in positions of the deputy director of the Minister Secretary and Asia-Pacific Department (2006–2008).

On 1 December 2014, she was nominated first Poland ambassador to Malta. She presented her credentials on 26 March 2015 to the acting president Dolores Cristina. As roving ambassador, she was residing permanently in Warsaw. In March 2019 she ended her term. In January 2025, she became Chargé d'affaires of the Embassy of Poland in Panama City, in April 2025 she was nominated Ambassador to Panama, accredited also to Belize, Dominican Republic, Guatemala, Haiti, Honduras, Nicaragua, and Salvador.

She speaks English, Spanish and French languages.

== Works ==
- Społeczne konsekwencje włoskiego „cudu gospodarczego”, [in:] Wybrane zagadnienia ekonomiczne Polski, Unii Europejskiej i świata, 2012, Oficyna Wydawnicza SGH.
- Chiny w procesie globalizacji, [in:] Prace i Materiały ISM, nr 39/2011, Kolegium Społeczno-Ekonomiczne SGH.
- Chiny wobec światowego kryzysu ekonomicznego, [in:] Studia i Prace, nr 3/2010, Oficyna Wydawnicza SGH.
- Relacje Unii Europejskiej z państwami ASEAN, [in:] Studia i Prace, nr 19/2009, Oficyna Wydawnicza SGH.
- Włochy wobec światowego kryzysu gospodarczego, [in:] Gospodarka Narodowa, nr 11-12/2009, Instytut Gospodarki Narodowej SGH.
- Rola sektora państwowego w powojennym rozwoju Włoch oraz w okresie boomu gospodarczego w latach 50. i 60. XX wieku, [in:] Kwartalnik KES SGH nr 1/2016
- Społeczne i ekonomiczne przesłanki sycylijskiego separatyzmu od zjednoczenia Włoch do połowy XX wieku. Mafia a kwestia niepodległości Sycylii, [in:] Kwartalnik KES SGH nr 2/1018
