= Aleksandra Bukowska-McCabe =

Polish diplomat

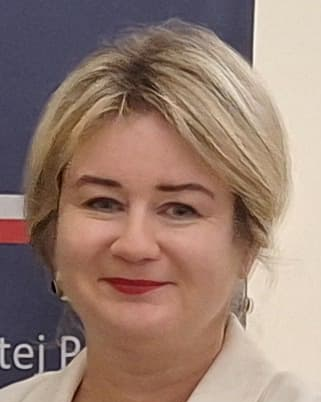
- Aleksandra Bukowska-McCabe (2024)
- Born: 1977 (age 48–49); Warsaw
- Education: University of Warsaw
- Occupations: Hebraist, diplomat
- Title: Representative of the Republic of Poland to the Palestinian National Authority (2014–2019)
- Predecessor: Bogusław Ochodek
- Successor: Przemysław Czyż

Aleksandra Bukowska-McCabe (born 1977 in Warsaw) is a Polish diplomat, ambassador to Lebanon (since 2025).

== Life ==
Bukowska-McCabe in 2002 graduated from Hebraic studies at the University of Warsaw. In 2008, she obtained a PhD degree at the Faculty of Oriental Studies of the University of Warsaw, presenting the thesis on Beta Israel.

In 2004, following her studies at the Diplomatic Academy of the Ministry of Foreign Affairs, she joined the MFA Department of Africa and the Middle East. Between 2005 and 2010 she served as First Secretary at the Embassy of Poland in Tel Aviv. From 2010 to 2014 she was Head of the Middle East Peace Process, Israel and Palestine Unit of the Department of Africa and the Middle East, MFA. In February 2014, she was nominated Representative of the Republic of Poland to the Palestinian National Authority. She ended her term on 31 July 2019. On 25 February 2023, she became deputy director of the Department of Africa and the Middle East, and on 3 October 2023 acting director. In November 2024, she took the post of Chargé d'affaires of Poland to Lebanon. In April 2025, she was nominated ambassador to Lebanon.
