= Michał Murkociński =

Polish diplomat (born 1964)

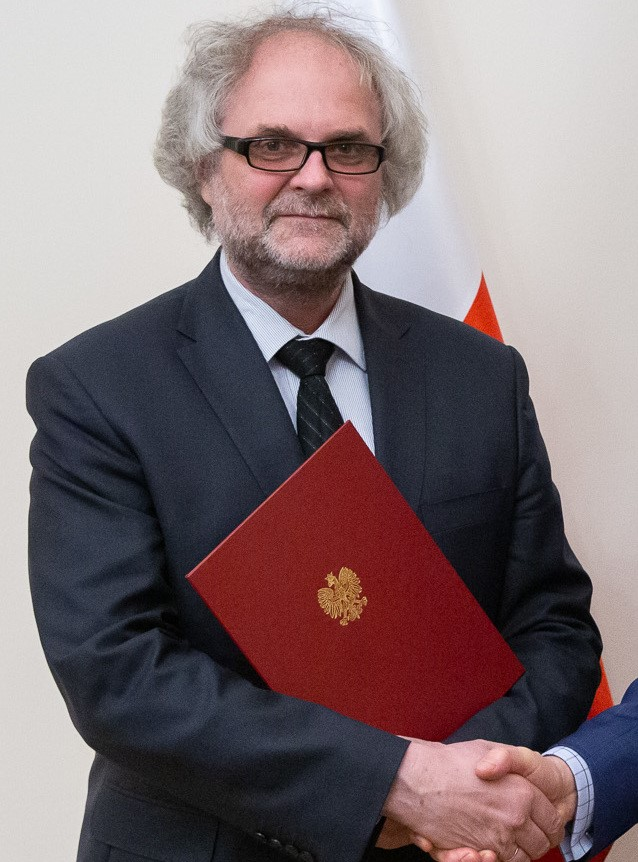

Poland Ambassador to Syria
- In office 2008–2012
- Preceded by: Jacek Chodorowicz
- Succeeded by: Krzysztof Czapla

Poland Ambassador to Egypt
- In office 2014–2018
- Preceded by: Piotr Puchta
- Succeeded by: Michał Łabenda

Poland Ambassador to Sudan
- In office 2019–2024

Poland Ambassador to Egypt
- Incumbent
- Assumed office 2025
- Preceded by: Michał Łabenda

Personal details
- Born: 1964 (age 61–62) Kraków, Poland
- Spouse: Joanna Murkocińska
- Children: 2 sons
- Education: Jagiellonian University
- Profession: Diplomat, arabist

Michał Murkociński (born 1964, in Kraków) is a Polish diplomat and Arabist, serving as an ambassador to Syria (2008–2012), Egypt (2014–2018; since 2025) and Sudan (2019–2024).

== Education and career ==
Murkociński holds an M.A. in Arab studies from the Jagiellonian University (1990). He has been studying in Damascus, Cairo and Stanford University, as well. In the early 1990s, he was working as an Arabic language teacher.

In 1993, Murkociński joined the Ministry of Foreign Affairs. Following his secondment to the embassy in Cairo, he was First Secretary at the embassy in Damascus (1996–2001). Between 2004 and 2006, he worked at the embassy in Beirut, taking also responsibility for chargé d'affaires. Afterwards, from 2006 to 2008, he was the director of the Department of Africa and the Middle East. In 2008, he started his term as an ambassador to Syria. Four years later, due to the outbreak of the Syrian Civil War, he closed the embassy and returned to Warsaw. For the next two years he was working as a deputy director of the aforementioned department. Between 2014 and 2018, he was the ambassador to Egypt, with accreditation to Sudan and Eritrea as well. In 2018, back in Warsaw, he was head of the Persian Gulf Unit at the Ministry. On 29 March 2019, he was appointed roving ambassador to Sudan. He ended his term on 31 August 2024. In March 2025, he became chargé d'affaires to Egypt, and next month ambassador to Egypt, additionally accredited to Eritrea.

Murkociński is married to Joanna Murkocińska, with two sons. Beside Polish and Arabic, he speaks English, Russian, and French languages.

He authored several articles on Damascus Arabic.

== Works ==
- Murkocińska, Joanna; Murkociński, Michał (2015), Polsko-arabski słownik frazeologiczny dialektu syryjskiego, Kraków: Księgarnia Akademicka, p. 424, ISBN 978-83-7638-563-1
