= Maciej Ziętara =

Polish politician

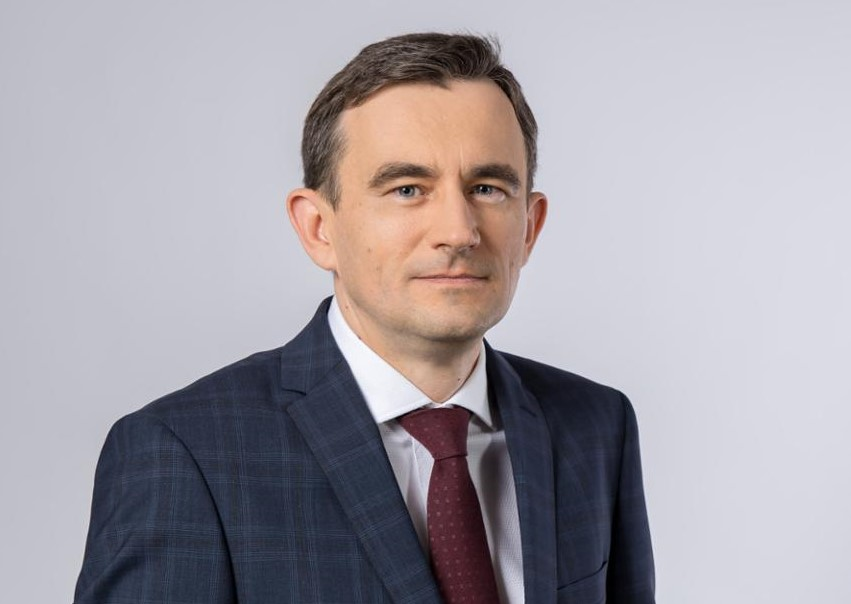

Poland Ambassador to Colombia
- In office 2012–2016
- Preceded by: Jacek Perlin
- Succeeded by: Agnieszka Frydrychowicz-Tekieli

Poland Ambassador to Mexico
- In office 25 August 2018 – 31 July 2024
- Preceded by: Beata Wojna
- Succeeded by: Agnieszka Frydrychowicz-Tekieli

Personal details
- Born: 1971 (age 54–55) Kielce, Poland
- Children: two daughters
- Education: University of Warsaw
- Profession: Diplomat, translator

Maciej Tadeusz Ziętara (born 1971 in Kielce) is a Polish translator, civil servant and diplomat, serving as Poland Ambassador to Colombia (2012–2016) and Mexico (2018–2024).

== Life ==
Maciej Ziętara has graduated from Hispanic studies at the University of Warsaw (M.A., 1994). He was studying also at the National Autonomous University of Mexico (1997).

He was working as a literary critic at the Literatura na Świecie (World Literature) and as a translator of Spanish-language literature. He was awarded by the Association of Polish Translators and Interpreters.

In 1999, he joined the Ministry of Foreign Affairs. Between 2002 and 2003 he was head of the Latin America Unit, responsible for bilateral cooperation with Mexico, Cuba and Middle America as well as representing Poland at the NATO and European Union groups for Latin America. From 2003 to 2009 he was working at the embassy in Santiago de Chile as Second, and First Secretary for political, cultural and consular affairs; since 2008 he has been chargé d'affaires. Between 2009 and 2012 he was back at the MFA desk officer for Cuba, Venezuela and the Caribbean.

On 3 August 2012 he was nominated an ambassador to Colombia, presenting his letter of credence to minister María Ángela Holguín on 19 October 2012. he was accredited also to Panama, Dominican Republic, Haiti, Saint Lucia, Antigua and Barbuda. He returned to Poland in June 2016. He was in charge of relations with the Andean states. He was also responsible for reopening of the Polish embassy in Panama City. Since 25 August 2018 Maciej Ziętara serves as ambassador to Mexico, accredited to Costa Rica as well. On 30 October 2018, he presented his credentials to the President of Mexico Enrique Peña Nieto, and on 14 November 2018, to the acting Minister of Foreign Affairs of Costa Rica Lorena Aguilar Revelo. He ended his term on 31 July 2024. In February 2025, he became deputy director of the MFA Department of the Americas.

Besides Polish, he speaks English, Spanish and French languages. He is married, with two daughters.

== Translations ==
- Zoé Valdés: Oddałam ci całe życie. Maciej Ziętara (trans.). Warszawa: Noir sur Blanc, 1999, pp. 246. ISBN 83-86743-88-3.
- Eliseo Alberto: Caracol Beach. Maciej Ziętara (trans.). Warszawa: Muza, 2001, pp. 278. ISBN 83-7200-964-3.
- Eliseo Alberto: Niech Bóg sprawi, żeby istniał Bóg. Maciej Ziętara (trans.). Warszawa: Muza, 2003, pp. 229. ISBN 83-7319-247-6.
- 101 : 6 poetas polacos contemporáneos. Maciej Ziętara, Mauricio Barrientos (trans.). Santiago de Chile: RIL, 2008, pp. 255. ISBN 978-956-284-603-5.
