= Krzysztof Dobrowolski =

Polish diplomat

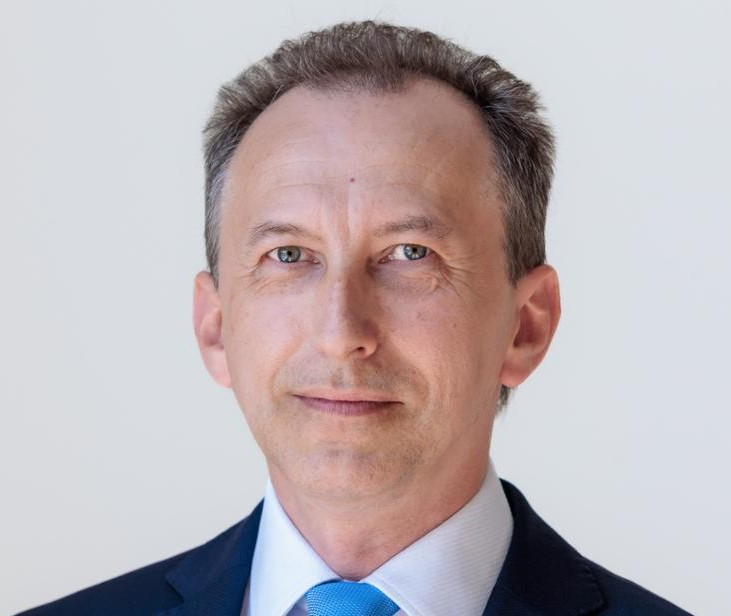
- Krzysztof Dobrowolski (2023)

Poland Ambassador to Malaysia
- Incumbent
- Assumed office 2023
- Preceded by: Krzysztof Dębnicki

Personal details
- Spouse: Agnieszka Czerwik-Dobrowolska
- Children: 2
- Education: Jagiellonian University
- Profession: Diplomat

Krzysztof Dariusz Dobrowolski is a Polish diplomat, since 2023 he is serving as Poland ambassador to Malaysia.

== Life ==
Krzysztof Dobrowolski in 1996 earned his Master's of Arts degree in Oriental studies from the Jagiellonian University. For one year he was studying Hindi in Ager, India. He is a graduate of the National School of Public Administration in Warsaw (1997–1999).

Dobrowolski joined the Polish diplomatic service in 1999 and became desk officer for relations with Finland. Since 2000, he was working at the Asia-Pacific Department, specializing in relations with South Asian and Southeast Asian countries. Between 2004 and 2008, he was Deputy Head of Mission at the Embassy in Bangkok, Thailand. In 2008, he became head of the MFA Southeast Asian Section. In 2009, he was promoted the deputy director of the Asia-Pacific Department. Between 2011 and 2015, he was Deputy Head of Mission at the Embassy in Beijing, China. From 2015 to 2023, he was deputy director of the Asia-Pacific Department. On 12 May 2023, he was appointed Ambassador Extraordinary and Plenipotentiary of the Republic of Poland to Malaysia, additionally accredited to Brunei Darussalam. He began his post on 31 July 2023.

Besides Polish, he speaks English and Hindi languages. He can also communicate in French and Thai.

He is married to Agnieszka Czerwik-Dobrowolska with two children.
