= Monika Zuchniak-Pazdan =

Polish diplomat

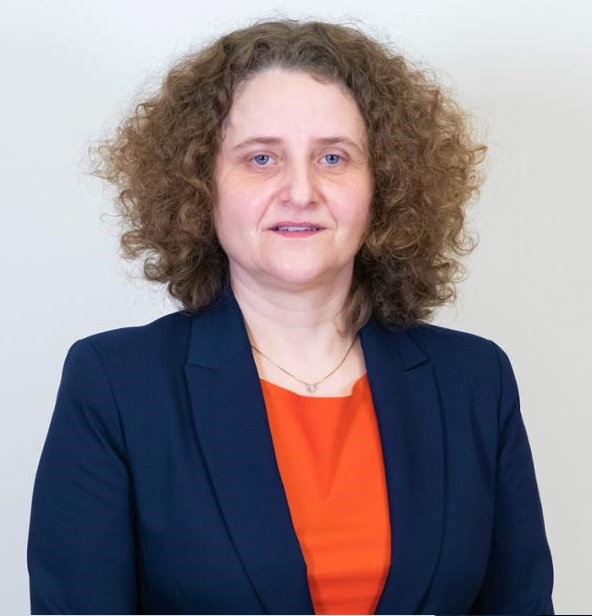

Poland Ambassadors to Albania
- In office 1 April 2021 – August 2024
- Appointed by: Andrzej Duda
- President: Ilir Meta
- Preceded by: Karol Bachura
- Succeeded by: Wojciech Unolt

Poland Consul General to Varna
- In office 2006–2008
- Preceded by: Wiesław Nowicki
- Succeeded by: Office abolished

Personal details
- Born: 1 July 1974 (age 52) Nowy Sącz
- Children: 1
- Education: Wyższa Szkoła Biznesu – National-Louis University
- Profession: Diplomat

Monika Aleksandra Zuchniak-Pazdan (born 1 July 1974, in Nowy Sącz) is a Polish diplomat; an ambassador to Albania (2021–2024).

== Life ==
Monika Zuchniak-Pazdan attended high school in Nowy Sącz. She graduated from marketing (1999) and international relations and diplomacy (2001) at Wyższa Szkoła Biznesu – National-Louis University.

In 2000, she began her career at the public administration as an intern at the Chancellery of the Prime Minister of Poland. In 2002, she joined the Ministry of Culture. Later, she returned to Nowy Sącz to work as a lecturer at her alma mater. Following her work for the chancellery of the Sejm, in 2003 she joined the Ministry of Foreign Affairs of Poland as a deputy director of the Promotion Department. In 2006, she became consul general in Varna, Bulgaria. Two years later, she finished her term, closing the consulate. Later, she was heading the consular sections at the embassies in: Ottawa, Tallinn, Beirut, Riga, Vilnius. In 2018, she became at first acting director, and then director of the Director General's Office. In October 2020, she was accepted by the parliament as an ambassador to Albania and appointed by the President following month. She began her term on 1 April 2021, and ended in August 2024. In 2026, she became consul in Ottawa, Canada.

In 2019, she was awarded Silver Cross of Merit.

Zuchniak-Pazdan is a widow, mother of 1 daughter.
