= Jacek Chodorowicz =

Polish diplomat (born 1964)

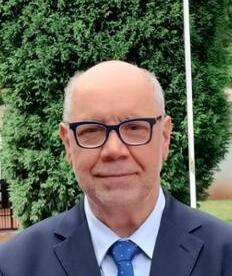
- Jacek Chodorowicz (2025)

Poland Ambassador to Syria
- In office 2002–2008
- Preceded by: Stanisław Pawlak
- Succeeded by: Michał Murkociński

Poland Ambassador to Israel
- In office 2012–2018
- Preceded by: Agnieszka Magdziak-Miszewska
- Succeeded by: Marek Magierowski

Personal details
- Born: 7 December 1964 (age 61) Warsaw, Poland
- Children: 2
- Education: University of Warsaw
- Profession: Diplomat

Jacek Michał Chodorowicz (born 7 December 1964, in Warsaw) is a Polish diplomat who served as ambassador to Syria (2002–2008) and Israel (2012–2018).

== Life ==
Chodorowicz graduated in history from the University of Warsaw. He was educated also at the Netherlands Institute of International Relations Clingendael.

In 1991, he started his professional career as the assistant of the Undersecretary of State at the Ministry of National Education. In 1992, he joined the Ministry of Foreign Affairs (MFA). Until 1995, he was expert and head of section of the Department of Africa, Asia, Australia and Oceania. Between 1995 and 1999, he served as chargé d'affaires to Zimbabwe. Following his return to the MFA headquarter in Warsaw, he was director of the Department of Africa and the Middle East. From 2001 to 2008, he was ambassador to Syria. Next, he returned to his previous post of the Department's director. On 24 January 2012, he was appointed ambassador to Israel. He ended his mission on 30 May 2018. From 2018 to 2021, he was Minister of Foreign Affairs Plenipotentiary for dialogue with Jewish Diaspora. Next, he was working at the MFA Department of Development Cooperation. In 2023, he became for the third time the director MFA Department of Africa and the Middle East. In January 2025, he became chargé d'affaires a.i. of the Embassy in Pretoria, South Africa.

In 2011, he was honored with the Knight's Cross of the Order of Polonia Restituta.

Besides his native Polish, he speaks English and French.

He is father to two sons.
