= Wiesław Kuceł =

Polish diplomat

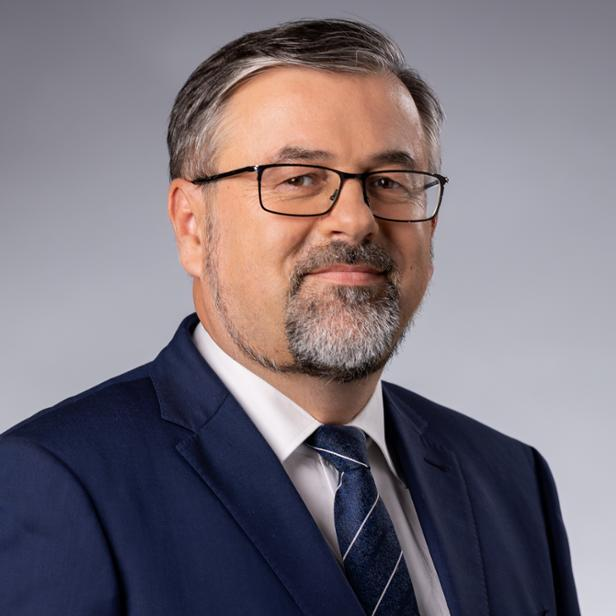

Poland Ambassador to Palestinian National Authority
- Incumbent
- Assumed office 2024
- Preceded by: Przemysław Czyż

Personal details
- Born: 1971 (age 54–55)
- Education: Moscow State Institute of International Relations
- Profession: Diplomat

Wiesław Kuceł (born 1971) is a Polish diplomat and civil servant, a Representative to the Palestinian National Authority (since 2024).

== Life ==
Kuceł graduated from the Moscow State Institute of International Relations. He was educated also in national security postgraduate studies at the National Defence University of Warsaw.

In 1997, he started his professional career at the Ministry of Foreign Affairs (MFA), specialising in relations with the Middle East and North Africa countries. From 2001 to 2005, he served as First Secretary at the Embassy in Tel Aviv, being in charge of contacts with the Palestinian Authority, among others. Between 2008 and 2010, he was head of the Political and Economic Section at the Polish Embassy in Beirut. From 2010 to 2015, he was Deputy Head of Mission at the Embassy in Tel Aviv. Following his return to MFA headquarter, he was head of the Maghreb and Mashriq Section of the Africa and Middle East Department (2016–2019). Afterwards, he was heading the Political and Economic Section at the Embassy in Cairo (2019–2021). In 2024, Kuceł was appointed Representative of the Republic of Poland to Palestinian Authority.
