= Krzysztof Grzelczyk =

Polish politician (born 1957)

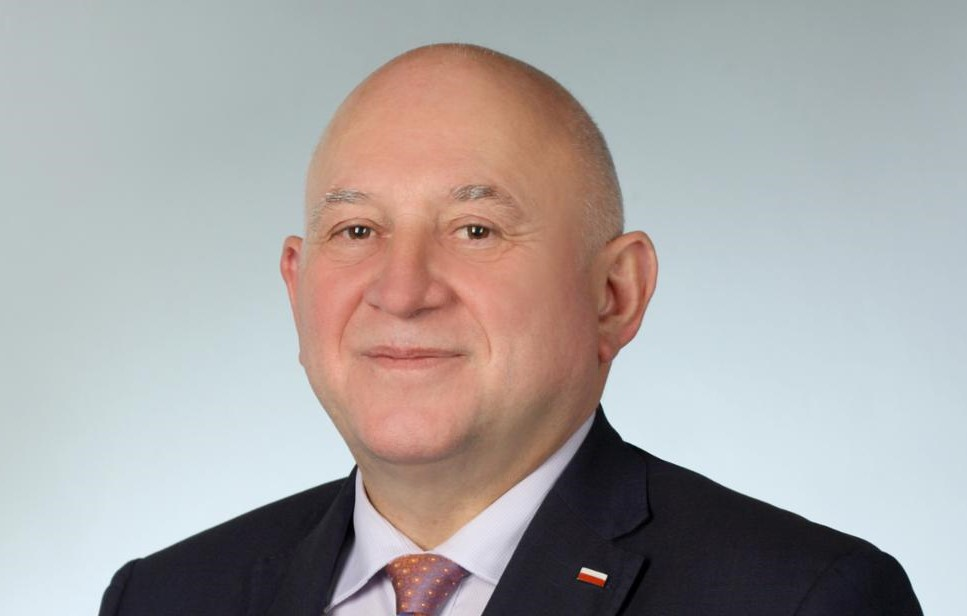

6th Poland Ambassador to North Macedonia
- In office 19 May 2023 – July 2024
- Preceded by: Wojciech Tyciński

Personal details
- Born: 3 July 1957 (age 69) Krosno Odrzańskie
- Spouse: Jolanta Grzelczyk
- Education: University of Wrocław
- Profession: political scientist, politician, diplomat

Krzysztof Stanisław Grzelczyk (born 3 July 1957, in Krosno Odrzańskie) is a Polish political scientist, politician, and diplomat, ambassador to North Macedonia (2023–2024).

== Life ==
Grzelczyk graduated in 1982 from the University of Wrocław, Faculty of Political Sciences. In the 1970s and 1980s, he was active in the dissident movement. Among others, he was co-founder of the Independent Students' Association at his Faculty. After introducing martial law on 13 December 1981, he was imprisoned until 3 July 1982. In 1985, he emigrated to Canada and was working there as a driver, in accountancy, and as a librarian.

In the early 1990s, Grzelczyk returned to Poland and worked for the private sector and local government, on managerial posts mostly, e.g. as a director of the Bureau for Foreign Co-operation of the city of Wrocław (2000–2005). From 1991 to 1998, he was a member of the Centre Agreement political party. From 2005 to 2007, he served as the governor of the Lower Silesian Voivodeship, nominated by the Law and Justice party. From 2008 to 2009, he was deputy head of the Wrocław branch of the Institute of National Remembrance. In 2015, he was running for the Senate seat.

In 2016, Grzelczyk joined the foreign service. Until 2017, he was head of the Consular Section of the Embassy in London. From November 2017 to September 2021, he served as Consul-General in Toronto.

In March 2023, he was nominated Poland's ambassador to North Macedonia. He began his term on 19 May 2023, and ended in July 2024.

== Honours ==
- 2007 – Officer's Cross of the Order of Polonia Restituta, Poland
- 2020 – Cross of Freedom and Solidarity, Poland
- 2021 – Gold Medal of Merit for National Defence, Poland
- 2008 – Pro Memoria Medal, Poland
- 2022 – Honorary Badge of Wrocław, Poland

== Works ==
- Solidarność drukująca, Wrocław: Wydawnictwo Profil, 2013, ISBN 978-83-936337-3-9.
- Alfabet prawie wrocławski, Wrocław: Lena, 2015, ISBN 978-83-64195-22-8.

== Private life ==
Married to Jolanta Grzelczyk.
