= Beata Pęksa =

Polish diplomat

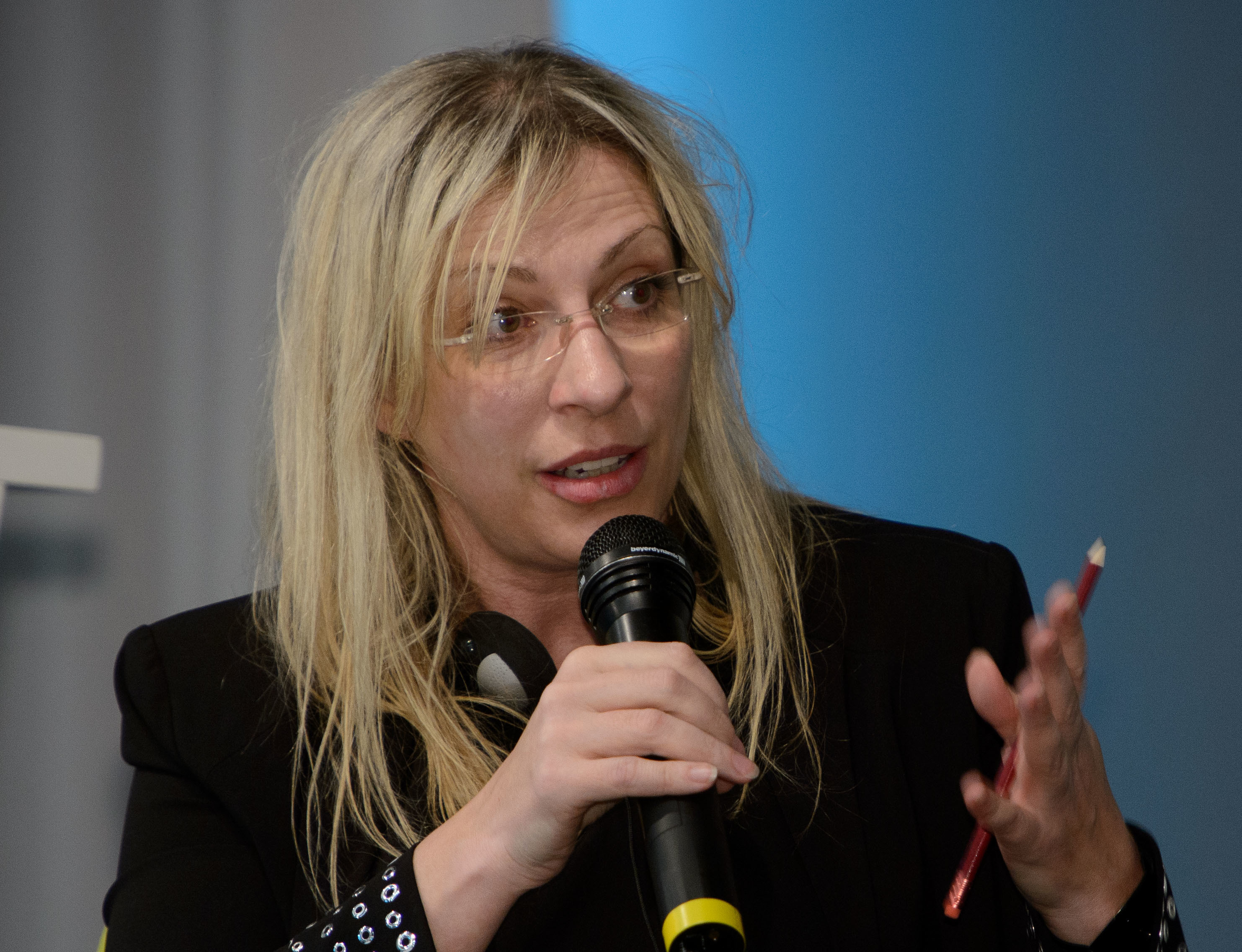

Poland Ambassador to Iraq
- In office January 2018 – 31 March 2020
- Preceded by: Lech Stefaniak
- Succeeded by: Marcin Kubiak

The European Union Ambassador to Turkmenistan
- In office 1 September 2023 – 2026
- Preceded by: Diego Ruiz Alonso

Personal details
- Education: University of Warsaw
- Profession: Diplomat

Beata Anna Pęksa (primo voto Pęksa-Krawiec) is a Polish diplomat, from 2023 to 2026 she was the European Union Ambassador to Turkmenistan, and from 2018 to 2020 she was Poland Ambassador to Iraq.

== Life ==
Pęksa graduated from journalism at the University of Warsaw. She was studying also European integration and applied social psychology.

In 1991, she began her career as a civil servant, joining the newly created National Security Bureau. She was responsible for international security issues. Since 1996 she has been working for the Security Policy Department of the Ministry of Foreign Affairs. She became head of NATO and WEU unit, and in 1999, the year of NATO enlargement, deputy director. Between 2002 and 2007 she was the deputy head of mission at the Permanent Mission of the Republic of Poland to the United Nations in New York. Among her duties were issues of peacekeeping operations. She was a vice-chairperson of the Special Committee on Peacekeeping Operations. Afterwards, she returned to the Security Policy Department as a specialist on European defense and security policy. In 2008, Pęksa was nominated representative of Poland at the EU Committee of Security Policy in Brussels.

Between 2013 and 2014 she was a Plenipotentiary of the Minister for Eastern Partnership. In 2016, she became deputy director, and the same year, the director of the Security Policy Department. She was one of the persons responsible for organizing NATO summit in Warsaw. In January 2018, she was appointed Poland ambassador to Iraq, ending her term on 31 March 2020. Next, she was Minister Plenipotentiary within the Central Asia Division, Eastern Department in the Polish Ministry of Foreign Affairs.

On 1 September 2023, she started her mission as the European Union Ambassador to Turkmenistan. She ended her term in 2026.

In 2012, she was awarded Silver Cross of Merit. Besides Polish, Pęksa speaks English, Russian, French, and Arabic languages.
