= Anna Parzymies =

Polish doctor (1939–2026)

- Born: 5 January 1939; Sofia, Bulgaria
- Died: 14 August 2026 (aged 87)
- Education: Warsaw University; Jagiellonian University
- Occupations: Arabist, Turkologist, orientalist, university teacher
- Known for: Professor at Warsaw University
- Partner: Stanisław Parzymies
- Website: www.wydawnictwodialog.pl

Anna Parzymies (5 January 1939 – 14 August 2026) was a Polish arabist, doctor of oriental studies, and professor at Warsaw University.

== Life and career ==
Anna Parzymies was born in Sofia, Bulgaria on 5 January 1939. She finished secondary school and college there. During 1957–1962, she studied at the Faculty of Turkish Philology at the University of Sofia. In 1962, she received a Bulgarian government grant to study Arabic at the Bourguiba Institute of Modern Languages, Tunis El Manar University, Tunisia. In 1971, she received a master's degree at the Faculty of Foreign Languages at Warsaw University. In 1978, she was awarded a Ph.D. degree at the Jagiellonian University in Kraków. Following habilitation in 1992, she was awarded a postdoctoral degree in the humanities, in the field of Turkic linguistics. Her main research interests include language contacts between Turkic and Slavic peoples and the cultures of Muslim communities.

She specialised in three areas of research:

- Islam in Europe (primarily as relates to the Maghreb minorities in France; Chechens, Ingush, Tatars, and other Muslim communities in the Russian Federation; Albanians and Bosnian Muslims in the Balkans);
- Arabic sociolinguistics and, in particular, the Turkish influences on spoken Arabic;
- Methodology of historical linguistics, with an emphasis on the Altaic language group.

Parzymies was also the creator and founder of Dialog Academic Publishing, a Polish publishing company started in 1992. The company specializes in publications that are related to Africa and Asia or are written by authors from the area. Fiction published includes classical Sanskrit poetry, modern Chinese poetry, and novels written by North African authors. It has also published a number of European authors. A considerable part of its output is related to religion and Oriental languages.

Parzymies died on 14 August 2026, at the age of 87.

== Awards and honours ==
- Parzymies was the founder of the Department of European Islam Studies at the Faculty of Oriental Studies of Warsaw University. In 2009, at a ceremony in Paris, she received the UNESCO-Sharjah Prize for Arab Culture.
- In 2018, she received an Ordre des Arts et des Lettres with the rank of Officier for the production of French works of art and literature.

== Selected publications ==
- Anthroponymie algérienne. Noms de famille moderne d'origine turque, (PWN, 1985)
- Encyklopedia. Świat w przekroju 1988 [The world in 1988. Encyclopedia], (coauthor, Wiedza Powszechna, 1989)
- Język protobułgarski. Przyczynek do rekonstrukcji na podstawie porównań turecko-słowiańskich [A contribution to the reconstruction of the Bulgar language on the basis of Turkic-Slavic comparisons], (Wydawnictwo Uniwersytetu Warszawskiego, 1994)
- Język czuwaski [The Chuvash language], (Wydawnictwo Akademickie "Dialog", 2000).

== Bibliography ==
=== Books ===
As author:

1. Tunezja [Tunisia], Wydawnictwa Uniwersytetu Warszawskiego, Warsaw 1984.
2. Anthroponymie algérienne. Noms de famille moderne d'origine turque, PWN, Warsaw 1985.
3. Język protobułgarski. Przyczynek do rekonstrukcji na podstawie porównań turecko-słowiańskich (A contribution to the reconstruction of the Bulgar language on the basis of Turkic-Slavic comparisons), Rozprawy Uniwersytetu Warszawskiego 381, ISSN 0509-7177, Wydawnictwa Uniwersytetu Warszawskiego, Warsaw 1994.
4. Język czuwaski [The Chuvash language], Wyd. Akademickie Dialog, Warsaw 2000, ISBN 83-88238-60-4.

As editor:

1. Islam a terroryzm [Islam and terrorism], a collection edited by Anna Parzymies, Wyd. Akademickie Dialog, Warsaw 2003, ISBN 83-88938-44-4.
2. Ferdinand de Saussure, Szkice z językoznawstwa ogólnego, redakcja naukowa polskiej wersji językowej A. Parzymies(Polish translation of Écrits de linguistique générale), Wyd. Akademickie Dialog, Warsaw 2004.
3. Muzułmanie w Europie [Muslims in Europe], a collection edited by Anna Parzymies, Wyd. Akademickie Dialog, Warsaw 2005, ISBN 83-89899-08-6.
4. Studies in Oriental Art and Culture in Honour of Professor Tadeusz Majda, a collection edited by Anna Parzymies, Wyd. Akademickie Dialog, Warsaw 2006, ISBN 83-89899-39-6.

=== Articles in books ===
1. Cyryl i Metody a kultura arabska [Cyril and Methodius and the Arab culture] [w:] T. Dąbek-Wirgowa, J. Wierzbicki (red.) Kategorie peryferii i centrum w kształtowaniu się kultur narodowych, Materiały konferencji naukowej, Wyd. UW, Warsaw 1986.
2. La diglossie au Maghreb – un probleme social [w:] S. Piłaszewicz, J. Tulisow (red.) Problemy języków Azji i Afryki, PWN, Warsaw 1987
3. Muzułmanie we Francji [Muslims in France] [w:] H. Jankowski (red.), Z Mekki do Poznania. Materiały 5. Ogólnopolskiej Konferencji Arabistycznej Poznań 9–10 czerwca 1997, Wydawnictwo UAM, Poznań 1998, ISBN 83-910799-0-2.
4. Ałtaizmy w języku polskim [Borrowings from the Altaic languages in Polish] [w:] Orient w kulturze polskiej. Materiały z okazji 25-lecia Muzeum Azji i Pacyfiku w Warszawie, Wyd. Akademickie Dialog, Warsaw 2000, ISBN 83-88-238-44-2.
5. Islam na Bałkanach [Islam in the Balkans][w:] A. Abbas (red.), Zagadnienia współczesnego islamu, Wyd. UAM, Poznań 2003, ISBN 83-910799-6-1.
6. U źródeł arabskiego antyamerykanizmu [At the source of the Arab anti-Americanism] [w:] A. Parzymies (red.), Islam a terroryzm, Wyd. Akademickie Dialog, Warsaw 2003.
7. Muzułmanie w Europie [Muslims in Europe] (co-authored by Agatą S. NALBORCZYK) [w:] E. Machut-Mendecka (red.), Oblicza współczesnego islamu, Academica, Warsaw 2003, ISBN 83-89281-03-1.
8. Muzułmanie w Bośni i Hercegowinie [Muslims in Bosnia and Herzegovina] [w:] A. Parzymies (red.), Muzułmanie w Europie, Wyd. Akademickie Dialog, Warsaw 2005.
9. Muzułmanie w Macedonii [Muslims in the Republic of Macedonia] [w:] A. Parzymies (red.), Muzułmanie w Europie, Wyd. Akademickie Dialog, Warsaw 2005.
10. Muzułmanie w Serbii i Czarnogórze [Muslims in Serbia and Montenegro] [w:] A. Parzymies (red.), Muzułmanie w Europie, Wyd. Akademickie Dialog, Warsaw 2005.
11. Muzułmanie w Jugosławii [Muslims in Yugoslavia] [w:] A. Parzymies (red.), Muzułmanie w Europie, Wyd. Akademickie Dialog, Warsaw 2005.
12. Muzułmanie w Bułgarii [Muslims in Bulgaria] [w:] A. Parzymies (red.), Muzułmanie w Europie, Wyd. Akademickie Dialog, Warsaw 2005.
13. Muzułmanie w Grecji [Muslims in Greece] [w:] A. Parzymies (red.), Muzułmanie w Europie, Wyd. Akademickie Dialog, Warsaw 2005.
14. Professor Tadeusz Majda and his research, teaching and organisational achievements [w:] A. Parzymies (red.), Studies in Oriental Art and Culture in Honour of Professor Tadeusz Majda, Wyd. Akademickie Dialog, Warsaw 2006.
15. Ethnonymes slaves. Propositions d'etymologies altaďques [w:] A. Parzymies (red.), Studies in Oriental Art and Culture in Honour of Professor Tadeusz Majda, Wyd. Akademickie Dialog, Warsaw 2006.
16. O nagłosowym ś- w języku protobułgarskim [On the initial ś- in the Bulgar language] [w:] E. Siemieniec-Gołaś, J. Georgiewa-Okoń (red.), Od Anatolii po Syberię. Świat turecki w oczach badaczy, Wyd. UJ, Kraków 2010.
17. Алтайски езикови влияния в славянските езици методологичен подход върху примера на думата koliba Проблеми на балканското и славянското езикознание, Фабер, Велико Търново 2010.

=== Articles in journals ===
1. Noms de famille en Algérie contemporaine, "Africana Bulletin" 23, 1975.
2. Uwagi na temat nazewnictwa geograficznego Algierii (Notes on the geographical names in Algeria), "Przegląd Informacji o Afryce" 4, 1976
3. Adaptation phonétique des noms de famille turcs a la langue parlée d'Algérie, "Africana Bulletin" 26, 1977.
4. Contenue ethnique des odjaks d'Algérie, "Africana Bulletin" 29, 1978.
5. Rozwój patronimikum algierskiego [Development of the Algerian patronymic], "Przegląd Informacji o Afryce" 1, 1979.
6. Stosunki turecko-tunezyjskie w XIX wieku [Turkish-Tunisian relations in the nineteenth century], "Afryka. Azja, Ameryka Łacińska" 1, 1982.
7. Appelatifs turcs dans le dialecte arabe de Tunis, "Rocznik Orientalistyczny" XLIII, 1984.
8. Aperçu sur l'évolution socio-lingistique de la langue arabe, "Africana Bulletin" 32, 1985.
9. Caractéristique typologique de la situation linguistique arabe, "Africana Bulletin" 33, 1986.
10. Słowiańsko-huńskie związki językowe [Slavo-Hunnic language relations], "Przegląd Orientalistyczny" 143:3, 1987.
11. Cyryl i Metody a kultura arabska [Cyril and Methodius and the Arab culture], "Afryka, Azja, Ameryka Łacińska" 68, 1990.
12. Une autre lecture de l'inscription de Pliska, "Journal Asiatique" 279:3–4, 1991.
13. Czy jest to pierwszy tekst w języku protobułgarskim [Is it the first text in the Bulgar language], "Afryka, Azja, Ameryka Łacińska" 69, 1992.
14. Jeszcze raz o strawie [Once again on pabulum], "Acta Philologica" 22, 1992.
15. Le passé chrétien et le présent tolérant de la Tunisie musulmane, "Studia Arabistyczne i Islamistyczne", III, 1996
16. O integracji ludności muzułmańskiej w Europie [On the integration of the Muslim population in Europe], "Studia Bobolanum" 2/2003, ISSN 1642-5650.
