= Marcin Kubiak (diplomat) =

Polish diplomat (born 1969)

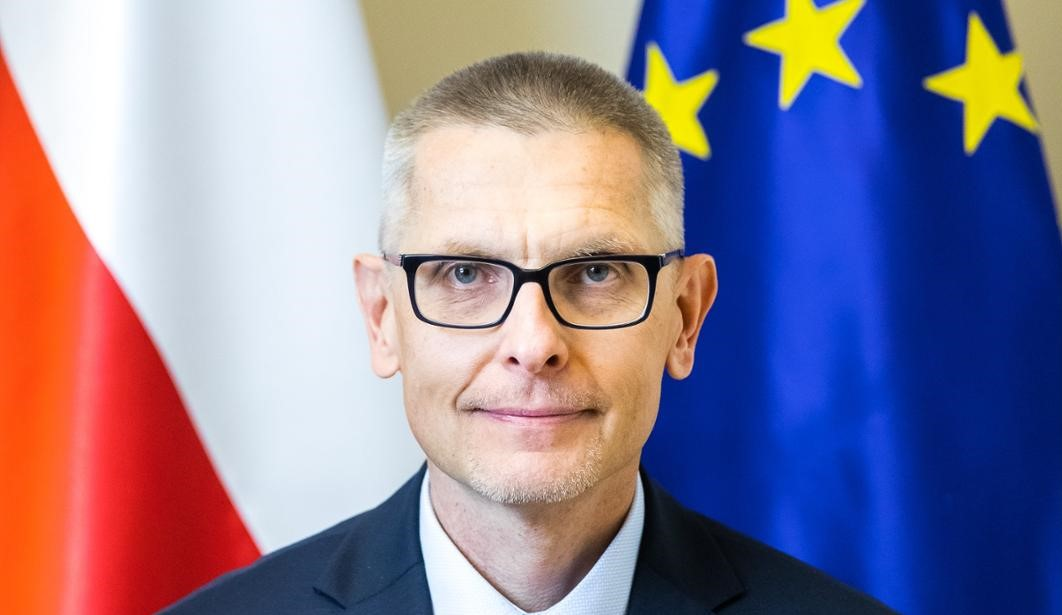

Poland Ambassador to Zimbabwe
- In office 2007–2008
- Preceded by: Jan Wieliński

Poland Ambassador to South Africa
- In office 2009–2012
- Preceded by: Romuald Szuniewicz
- Succeeded by: Anna Raduchowska-Brochwicz

Poland Ambassador to Malaysia
- In office 2015–2017
- Preceded by: Adam Jelonek
- Succeeded by: Krzysztof Dębnicki

Poland Ambassador to Iraq
- In office 2020–2024
- Preceded by: Beata Pęksa
- Succeeded by: Wojciech Bożek

Personal details
- Born: 4 November 1969 (age 56) Warsaw, Poland
- Education: Medical University of Warsaw
- Profession: Diplomat, physician

Marcin Kubiak (born 4 November 1969 in Warsaw) is a Polish diplomat, ambassador to Zimbabwe (2007–2008), South Africa (2009–2012), Malaysia (2015–2017), Iraq (2020–2024).

== Education ==
Kubiak graduated from the Medical University of Warsaw (1994). Between 1995 and 1997 he was studying at the National School of Public Administration. At that time he was an intern at the Ministry of Foreign Affairs and the Treasury Board of Canada Secretariat in Ottawa. Besides Polish, he speaks English and French.

== Diplomatic career ==
For a year he has been working as a physician at the State Clinical Hospital No. 1 in Warsaw(1994–1995). In 1997, he joined the Polish diplomatic service, starting from the post of a senior expert. Following his service as Second, and then First Secretary at the embassy in Nairobi, Kenya (1998–2003), he was working at the MFA Africa and the Middle East Department. In 2005, he was promoted deputy director there. In September 2007, he became ambassador to Zimbabwe. Just after closing the embassy next year, on 1 January 2009, he started representing Poland in South Africa, being accredited additionally to Botswana, Mozambique, Namibia, Malawi, Zimbabwe, Lesotho, Swaziland, Zambia. On 15 December 2012, he ended his term.

On 28 February 2013, he was appointed Under Secretary of State at the Ministry of Regional Development, and on 28 November 2013, at the Ministry of Infrastructure and Development. He finished his post on 18 December 2014. Between 2015 and 2017, he was ambassador to Malaysia, Brunei, and the Philippines. On 10 March 2020, he was nominated ambassador to Iraq, taking post on 1 August 2020. He presented his credentials to president Barham Salih on 24 September 2020. He ended his mission on 30 November 2024. Next, he returned to his duties in the MFA Department of Africa and the Middle East. On 19 January 2026, he became Chargé d'affaires a.i. to Kenya.
