= Poland–Russia relations =

- Poland: Russia

Diplomatic mission
- Embassy of Poland, Moscow: Embassy of Russia, Warsaw

Poland–Russia relations have a long and often turbulent history, dating to the late Middle Ages. Over the centuries, there have been several wars between Poland and Russia, with Poland once occupying Moscow during the Commonwealth era, and later Russia occupying Poland in the 18th and 20th centuries, leading to strained relations and multiple Polish attempts at re-acquiring independence. Polish–Russian relations entered a new phase following the fall of communism in 1989, with relations warming under Soviet premier Mikhail Gorbachev and later Russian president Boris Yeltsin. Relations began worsening considerably as a result of the Russian invasion of Georgia in 2008, and later the Russian annexation of Crimea in 2014 and especially the Russian invasion of Ukraine in 2022.

Relations between the Polish and Russian governments and their citizens have become increasingly hostile since the Russo-Ukrainian War. According to a 2022 poll, only 2% of Poles viewed Russia positively, the lowest number in the world among countries polled. Poland, a member of the European Union and NATO, sanctioned Russia after its invasion of Ukraine.

== History ==
=== Poland and Kievan Rus ===
One of the earliest known events in Rus'-Polish history dates back to 981, when the Grand Prince of Kiev, Vladimir Svyatoslavich, seized the Cherven Cities from the Duchy of Poland. The relationship between two by that time was mostly close and cordial, as there had been no serious wars between both.

In 966, Poland accepted Christianity from Rome while Kievan Rus'—the ancestor of Russia, Ukraine and Belarus—was Christianized by Constantinople. In 1054, the internal Christian divide formally split the Church into the Catholic and Orthodox branches separating the Poles from the Eastern Slavs.

In 1018, Svyatopolk the Cursed who fled from Kiev turned for help to the Polish king Bolesław I the Brave, who defeated Yaroslav the Wise in the Battle of the River Bug. During the Kiev campaign, Boleslaw was crowned with the capture of the city, but Boleslaw, instead of transferring power to Svyatopolk, began to rule in the city himself. In response, the people of Kiev raised an uprising, as a result of which they began to “beat the Poles”. Boleslaw fled with the treasury, and also took Yaroslav the Wise's sisters with him. The Cherven cities were restored to Poland until conquered again by Yaroslav the Wise and his brother Mstislav the Brave in 1030–1031.

A similar story took place in 1069, when the Grand Duke Izyaslav Yaroslavich ran to Poland to his nephew Bolesław II the Brave, and he, having made a trip to Kiev, intervened in the Rus' dynastic dispute in favor of Izyaslav. According to legend, a relic sword named Szczerbiec, which was used during the coronations of Polish kings, was notched when Boleslaw I or Boleslaw II struck the Golden Gate in Kiev. The first option cannot be true due to the fact that the Golden Gate was built in the 1030s, the second is also not confirmed by the results of carbon dating of the sword, which, apparently, was created not earlier than the second half of the 12th century.

At the same time, Kievan Rus' and Poland also knew long periods of peaceful coexistence (for example, during the life of Vladimir after 981) and military alliances. Thus, the Polish king, Kazimierz I, concluded an alliance with Yaroslav the Wise in 1042, marrying the first to the sister of the Grand Duke Maria Dobroneg. In 1074, according to the chronicle, peace with Boleslaw II was signed in Suteisk by the Smolensk prince Vladimir Vsevolodovich Monomakh, and in 1076 he together with the Volyn prince Oleg Svyatoslavich came to the aid of the Poles in a military campaign against the Czechs. The Grand Prince of Kiev, Svyatopolk Izyaslavich, made peace with the Polish king, Bolesław III Wrymouth, who in 1103 married the daughter of Svyatopolk Sbyslav; when in Poland a struggle broke out between Boleslaw III and his brother Zbigniew, the Rus' troops came to the aid of the king and forced Zbigniew to recognize his power.

Like the principalities that arose from the disintegration of Kievan Rus', Poland experienced several Mongol invasions in the 13th century, however, despite the devastation, the Mongol yoke was not established, which subsequently provided Poland with an advantage in the development of trade, culture and public relations. In 1340, Vladimir Lvovich died, the last Galician heir to the Rurik dynasty, after which the Galician principality was inherited by Kazimierz III the Great and annexed to the Kingdom of Poland.

=== Russian Tsardom and Russian Empire ===
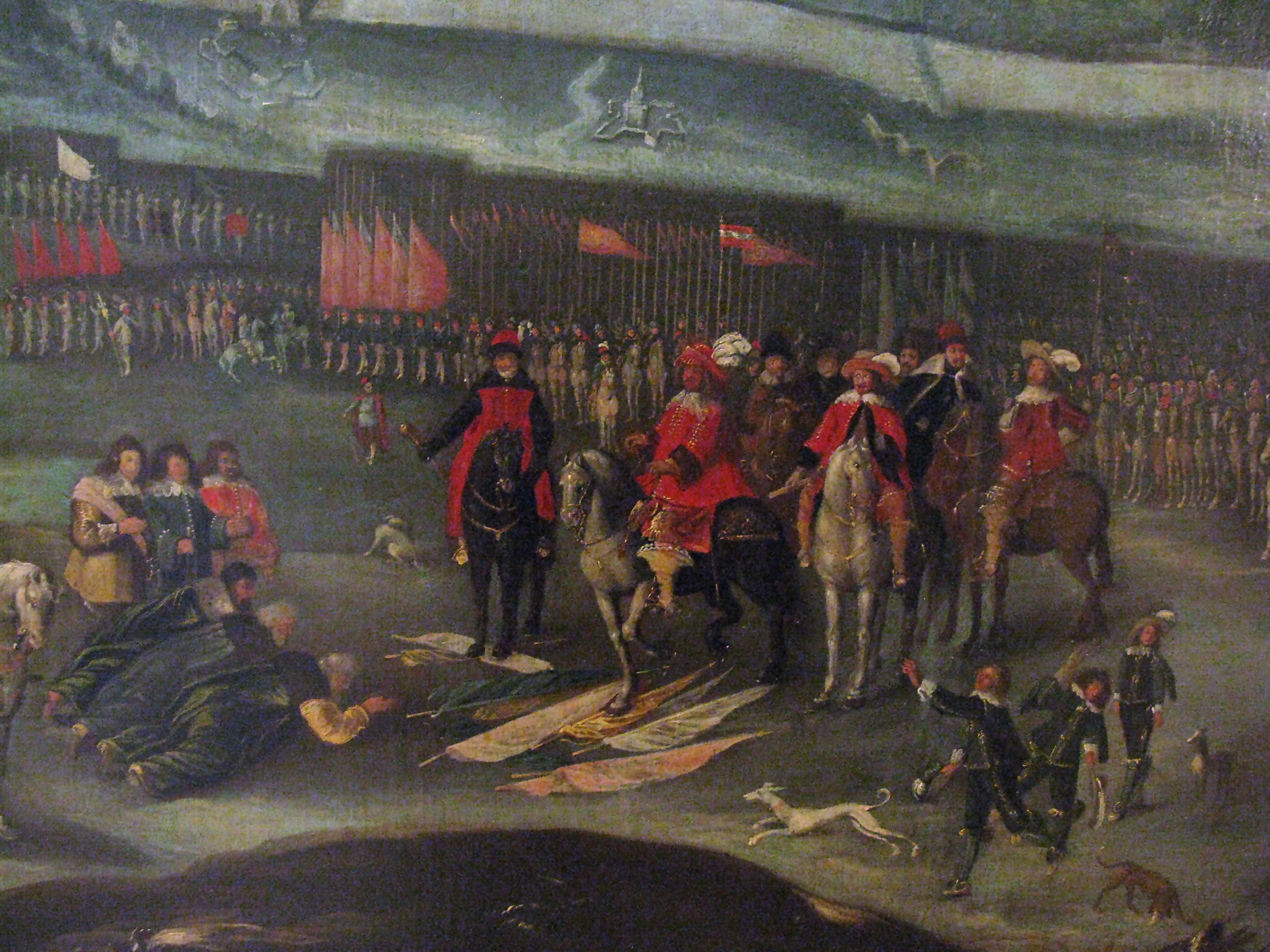
Capitulation of Russian garrison of Smolensk before Władysław IV of Poland in 1634

Relations between Poland and Muscovite Russia have been tense, as the increasingly desperate Grand Duchy of Lithuania involved the Kingdom of Poland into its war with Muscovy around 16th century. As Polish historian Andrzej Nowak wrote, while there were occasional contacts between Poles and Russians before that, it was the Polish union with Lithuania which brought Catholic Poland and Orthodox Russia into a real, constant relation with both states engaged in "the contest for the political, strategic and civilizational preponderance in Central and Eastern Europe". While there were occasional attempts to create an alliance between the new Polish–Lithuanian Commonwealth and the Grand Duchy of Moscow (including several attempts to elect the Muscovite tsars to the Polish throne and create the Polish–Lithuanian–Muscovite Commonwealth), they all failed. Instead, several wars occurred. Notably, during the Polish–Muscovite War (1605–18), Poland exploited Moscow's politically weakened state caused by civil war and Polish forces took Moscow – an event that would become one of the many defining moments of the future Polish–Russian relations. Russian Tsardom, now transforming into the Russian Empire, retaliated by taking advantage of the weakening Commonwealth, taking over disputed territories and moving its borders westwards in the aftermath of the Russo-Polish War (1654–67) and later participated in the destruction of the Commonwealth during the Swedish Deluge. By the beginning of the 18th century, with the deterioration of the Commonwealth political system (Golden Liberty) into anarchy, Russians were able to intervene in internal Polish affairs at will, politically and militarily, see (Silent Sejm, War of the Polish Succession). Around the mid-18th century, the influence of ambassadors and envoys from Russia to Poland, could be compared to those of colonial viceroys and the Commonwealth was seen by Russians as a form of protectorate.

With the failure of the Bar Confederation opposing the Russian political and military influence in Poland, the First Partition took place in 1772, followed by the Second Partition, and the Third Partition of Poland. By 1795, the three partitions of Poland erased Poland from the map of Europe. As Nowak remarked, "a new justification for Russian colonialism gathered strength from the Enlightenment": occupied Poland was portrayed by the Russian authors as an anarchic, dangerous country whose Catholic and democratic ideas had to be suppressed by the 'more enlightened neighbors.' Over the next 123 years, a large part of Polish population and former territory would be subject to the rule of the Russian Empire. However, Poland was undergoing a cultural and political revival after the First Partition culminating in the Constitution of 3 May 1791 and the Kościuszko Uprising in 1794. Many Polish expatriates and volunteers sided with Revolutionary and Napoleonic France in its struggles with the very same powers (Russia, Austria and Prussia) which had partitioned Poland. After 1815, several uprisings (most notably, the November Uprising and the January Uprising) would take place, attempting to regain Polish independence and stop the Russification and similar policies, aimed at removal of any traces of former Polish rule or Polish cultural influence, however only in the aftermath of the First World War would Poland regain independence (as the Second Polish Republic).

=== Soviet Union ===
Poland–Soviet Union relations
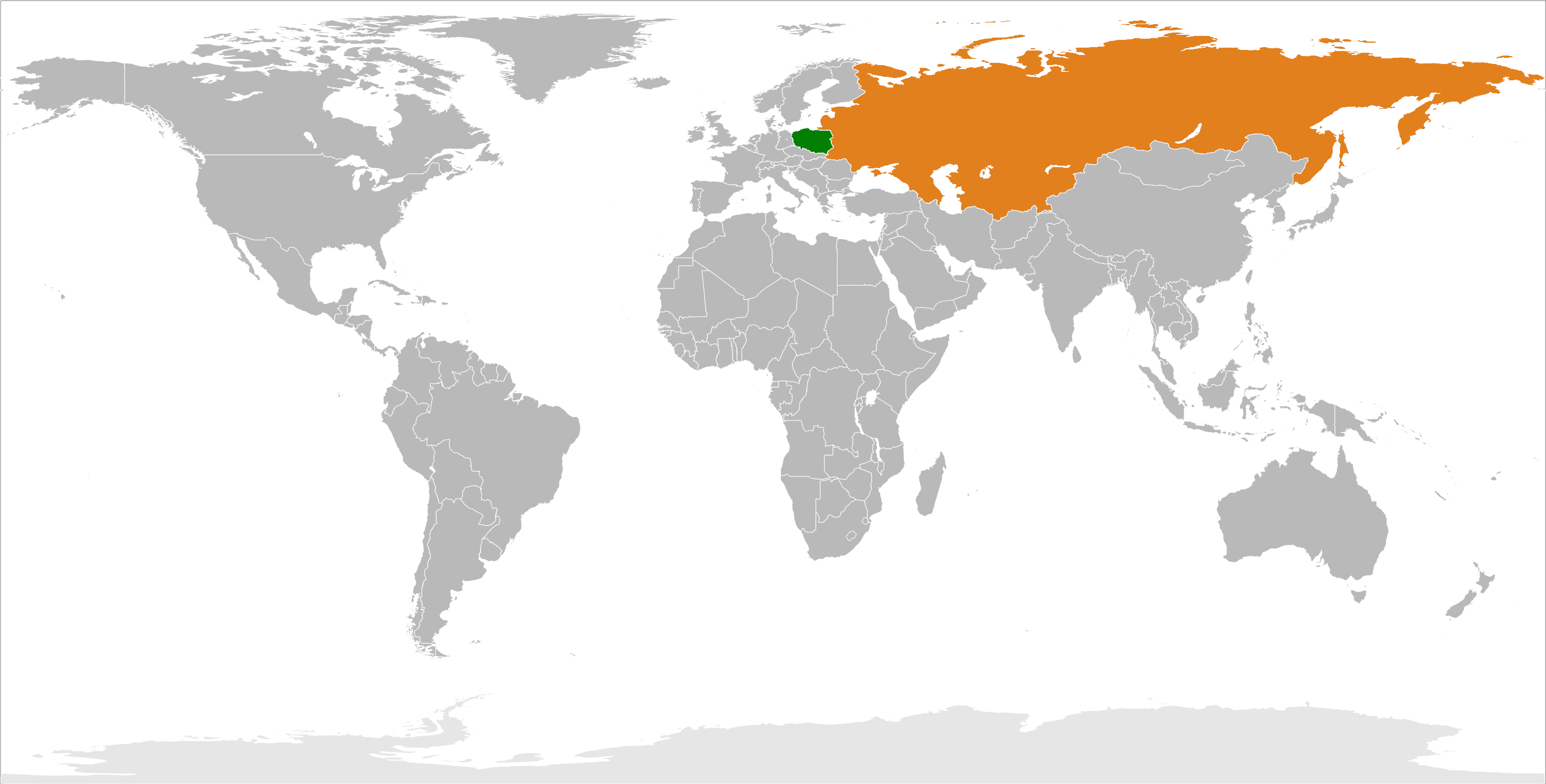

- Poland: Soviet Union

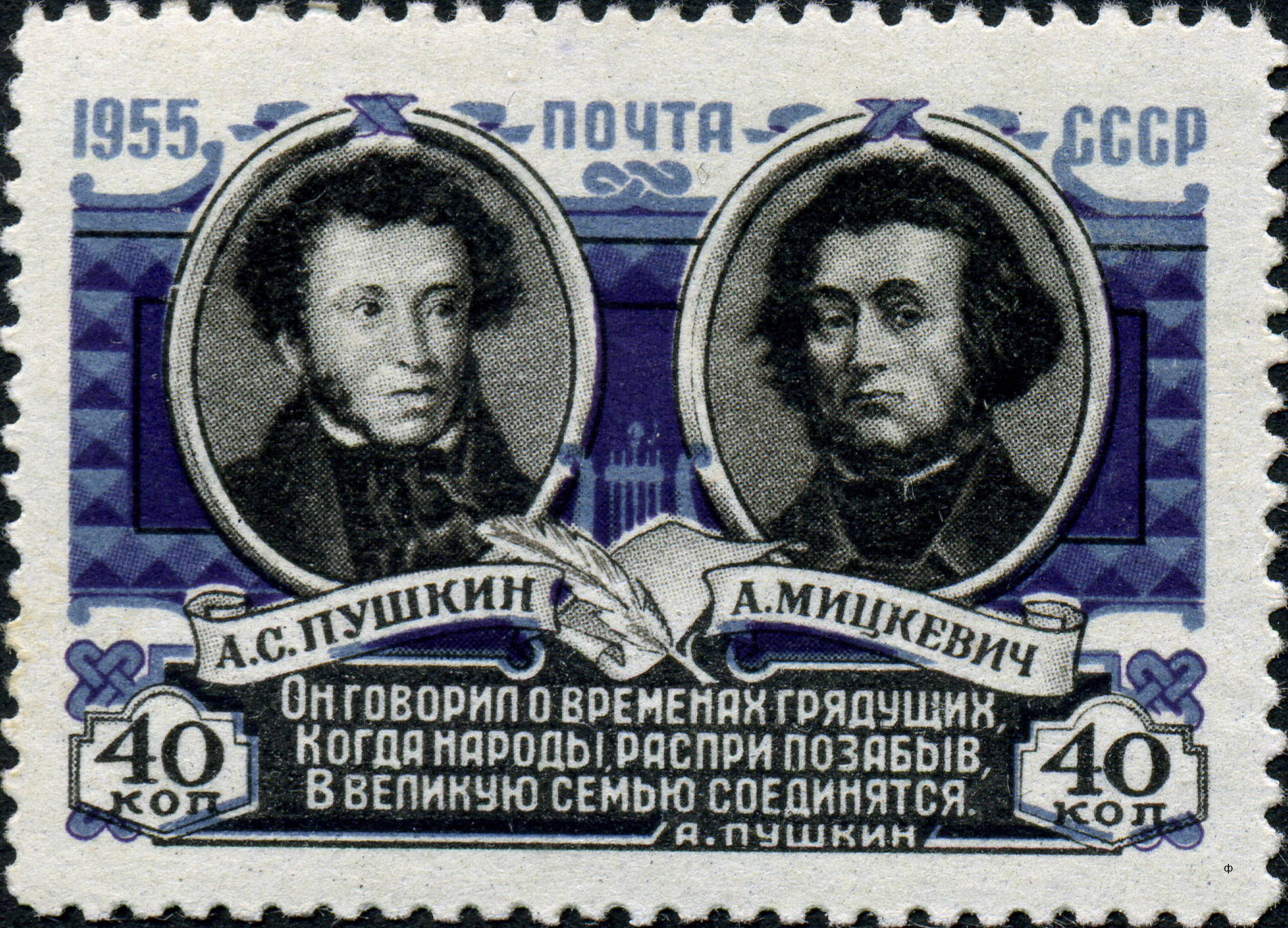
1955 Soviet stamp honouring Adam Mickiewicz and Alexander Pushkin

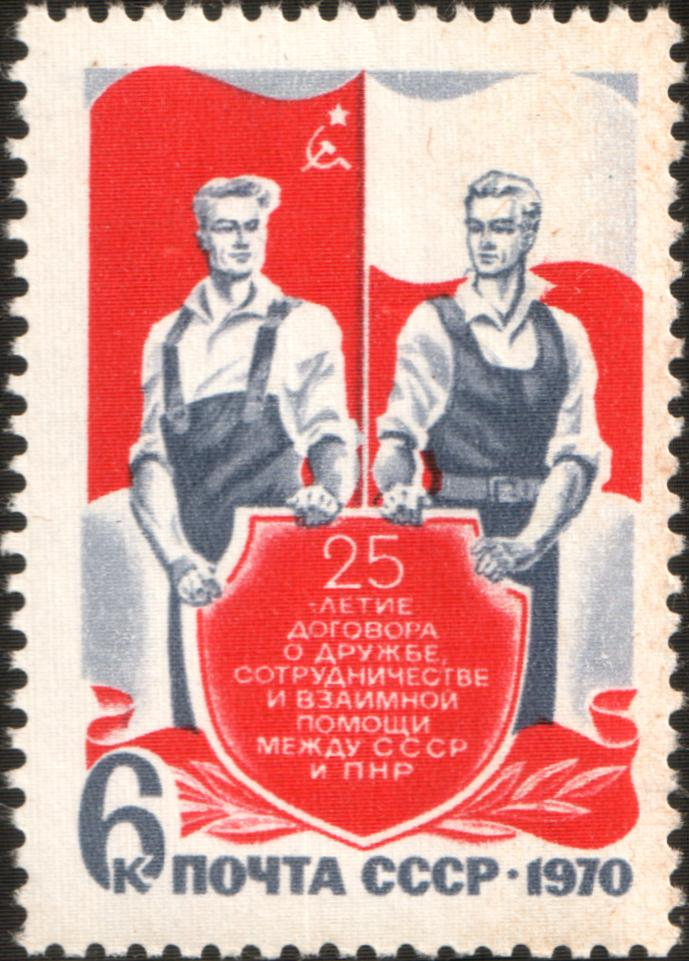
25th Anniversary of the Treaty of Friendship, Collaboration and Mutual Assistance between USSR and Poland

Nationalist opposition to Russian rule of Poland persisted through the 19th century, and after the fall of the Romanov dynasty in the Russian Revolution the German Empire forced Vladimir Lenin's new Bolshevik regime to sign the Treaty of Brest-Litovsk surrendering most of Russian Poland as a German client state. Immediately after regaining independence in 1918 after the fall of Germany, Poland was faced with a war with the new Bolshevik Russia, with the Polish–Soviet War eventually ending up with a Polish victory at Warsaw, spoiling Lenin's plans of sending his Red Army west to start a worldwide Communist revolution. However, Poland failed in its war aims to annex Soviet-occupied territories such as Ukraine, Belarus, and Lithuania, which were incorporated into the Soviet Union as Soviet Socialist Republics.

For the next two decades, Poland was seen by the Soviet Union as an enemy and, along with Germany (under both the Weimar Republic and the Third Reich), as a "politically illegitimate" state created by the Allied Powers during World War I at the expense of Germany and Russia. During the interwar period Joseph Stalin feared a coordinated Polish-Japanese two-front invasion. Numerous residents of the Ukrainian Soviet Socialist Republic also fled across the border to Poland in protest of the First Five-Year Plan's collectivization policies and the Holodomor. The Soviet Union supported subversive activities of the Communist Party of Poland, the Communist Party of Western Belarus, and the Communist Party of Western Ukraine. Poland in turn sent secret agents across the border to encourage rebellion against Soviet rule, which caused Stalin to begin to associate Poles in the Soviet Union with nationalist dissident and terrorist groups. The NKVD murdered 111,091 Poles during the Polish Operation and deported many families to Kazakhstan. Fears of a Polish invasion and external espionage also gave justification to the general internal repression of the Great Purge in the 1930s. Nevertheless, the USSR and Poland concluded a formal Non-Aggression Pact in 1932.

Eventually a secret agreement with Nazi Germany allowed Germany and the Soviet Union to successfully invade the Second Republic in 1939. The Soviet invasion of Poland, conducted mostly by Ukrainian Red Army units under Semyon Timoshenko, allowed the Soviet Union to annex much of Eastern Poland into Ukraine and Belarus. Most Polish Armed Forces officers captured by the Soviet Union were killed, while many soldiers were held in the Gulag system. The following years of Soviet repressions of Polish citizens, especially the brutal mass murder in 1940, known as the Katyn massacre, of more than 20,000 Polish officers and its subsequent Soviet denial for 50 years, became additional events with lasting repercussions on the Polish–Russian relations to this day. Nevertheless, Poland and the Soviet Union nominally became allies after the German invasion of the Soviet Union. In 1944, the Polish Home Army timed their capital's uprising to coincide with the Lublin-Brest Offensive by the Red Army and First Polish Army on the eastern suburbs of the city and the retreat of German forces. However, the Red Army stopped at the city limits, and wasn't advancing for several weeks, which some historians have described as deliberate inactivity. The Soviet Union also did not allow other allies to use its nearby airports for airdrops into Warsaw. This allowed the German forces to regroup and demolish the city while defeating the Polish resistance and causing between 150,000 and 200,000 civilian deaths. The tragic circumstances under which Poland's capital was liberated even further strained the Polish–Russian relations.

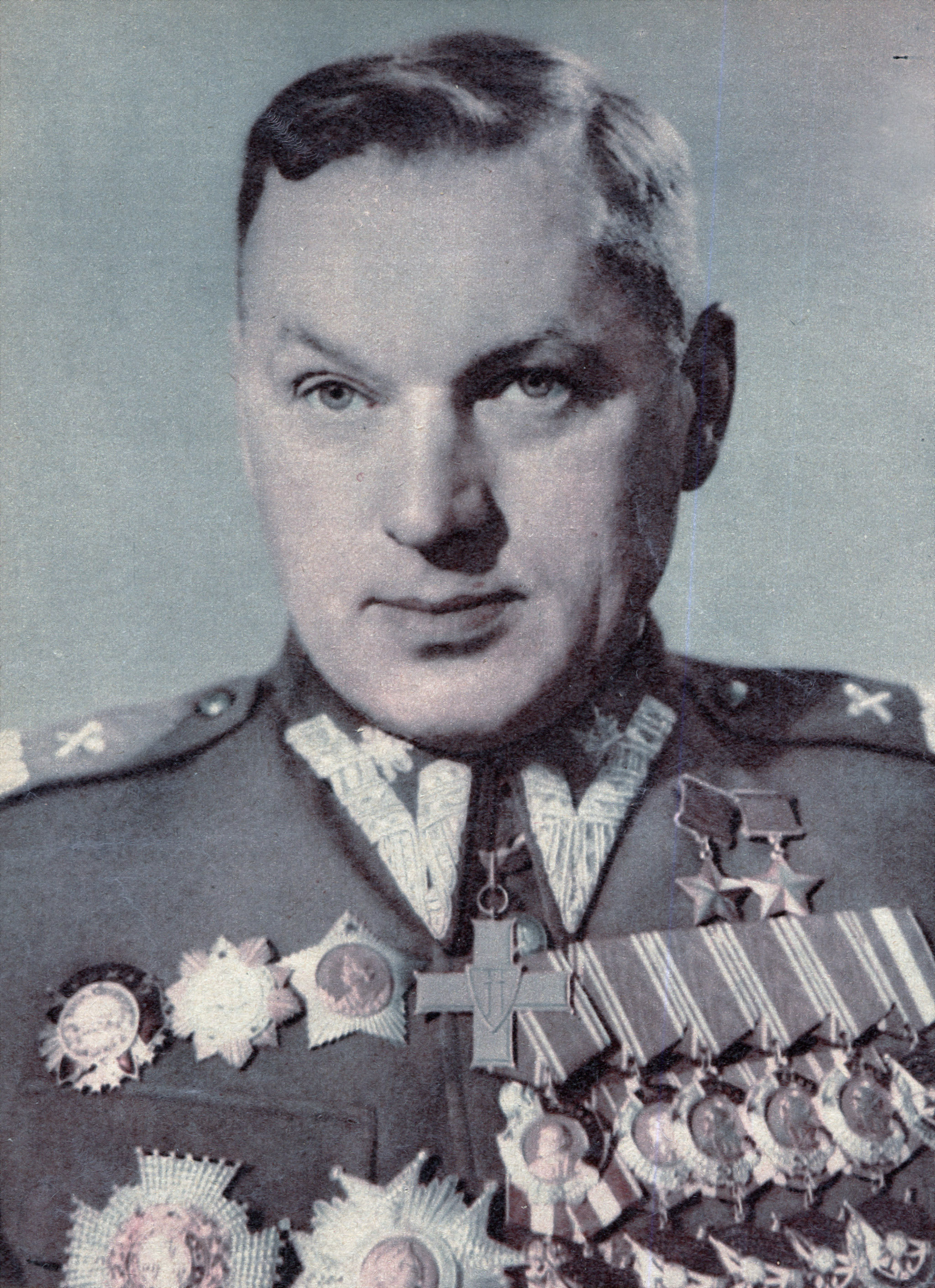
Konstantin Rokossovsky, Soviet Marshal of Polish origin and Poland's Defence Minister from 1949 until his removal in 1956

At the Yalta Conference in February 1945, Joseph Stalin was able to present his major allies, Franklin Roosevelt and Winston Churchill, with a fait accompli in Poland. His armed forces were in occupation of the country, and his agents, the communists, were in control of its administration. The Soviet Union was in the process of annexing the lands in eastern Poland, including the mass expulsion of the Polish population, which it had occupied between 1939 and 1941, after participating in the invasion and partition of Poland with Nazi Germany. Stalin was determined that Poland's new government would become his tool towards making Poland a Soviet puppet state controlled by the communists. He had severed relations with the legitimate Polish government-in-exile in London in 1943, but to appease Roosevelt and Churchill he agreed at Yalta that a coalition government would be formed. The Soviet Union supported Polish demands to be compensated by the loss of the eastern lands, from which 2-3 millions Polish citizens were expelled, by German hands east of the rivers Oder and Lusatian Neisse which had homed 9 million Germans. Stalin allowed Polish communist authorities to man the Oder–Neisse line as border, notwithstanding the lack of international consent for the new border, to prevent Germans from returning to their former homes after the German capitulation.

Many Poles were killed (e.g. during the Augustów roundup) or deported to the Soviet Union. Joseph Stalin decided to create a communist, Soviet allied Polish state subservient to him, the People's Republic of Poland. Thus Poland became part of the Eastern Bloc, as the People's Republic of Poland. The Soviet Union had much influence over both internal and external affairs, and Red Army forces were stationed in Poland (1945: 500,000; until 1955: 120,000 to 150,000; until 1989: 40,000). In 1945, Soviet generals and advisors formed 80% of the officer cadre of the Polish Armed Forces. The communists held a majority of key posts in this new government, and with Soviet support they soon gained almost total control of the country, rigging all elections. A pro-Soviet coalition between the Polish Socialist Party and the Polish Workers' Party assumed control of the country after the rigged 1947 Polish legislative election. Many of their opponents decided to leave the country, and others were put on staged trials and sentenced to many years of imprisonment or execution. In 1947 the ruling Polish Workers' Party joined the Soviet Cominform, beginning its entrance into the Eastern Bloc and increasing Soviet dominance of the Polish government.

Soviet control over the Polish People's Republic lessened after Stalin's death and Gomułka's Thaw, and ceased completely after the fall of the communist government in Poland in late 1989, although the Soviet-Russian Northern Group of Forces did not leave Polish soil until 1993. The continuing Soviet military presence allowed the Soviet Union to heavily influence Polish politics. The Polish People's Army was dominated by the Soviet Union through the Warsaw Pact, and Poland participated in the 1968 Warsaw Pact invasion of Czechoslovakia to suppress the Prague Spring reforms in Czechoslovakia. The Soviet Politburo closely monitored the rise in political dissent in Poland in the late 1970s and the subsequent rise of the anti-communist Solidarity trade union after the 1980 Lenin Shipyard strike. The Soviet state newspaper Pravda denounced the Gdańsk Agreement between the Polish government and Solidarity in similar terms to state media coverage of Alexander Dubček's government during the Prague Spring. It subsequently pressured the ruling Polish United Workers' Party and Wojciech Jaruzelski's government into declaring martial law. Soviet influence in Poland finally ended with the Round Table Agreement of 1989 guaranteeing free elections in Poland, the Revolutions of 1989 against Soviet-sponsored Communist governments in the Eastern Bloc, and finally the formal dissolution of the Warsaw Pact.

=== Post-communism ===
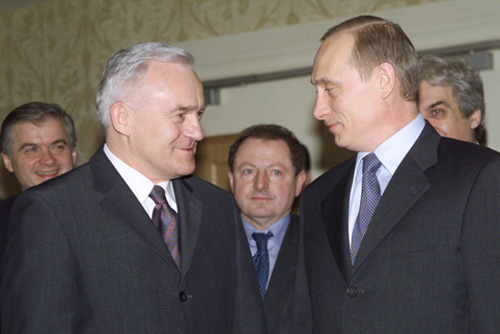
President of Russia Vladimir Putin and Prime Minister of Poland Leszek Miller in 2002

Modern Polish–Russian relations begin with the fall of communism – 1989 in Poland (Solidarity and the Polish Round Table Agreement) and 1991 in Russia (dissolution of the Soviet Union). With a new democratic government after the 1989 elections, Poland regained full sovereignty, and what was the Soviet Union, became 15 newly independent states, including the Russian Federation. Relations between modern Poland and Russia suffer from constant ups and downs. Among the constantly revisited issues is the fact that Poland has moved away from the Russian sphere of influence (joining NATO and the European Union) and pursuing an independent politic, including establishing a significant relations with post-Soviet states; for example, Poland was the first nation to recognize Ukraine's independence and Polish support for the pro-democratic Orange Revolution in 2004 against the pro-Russian presidential candidate Viktor Yanukovych in Ukraine has resulted in a temporary crisis in Polish–Russian relations.

Occasionally, relations will worsen due to remembrance of uneasy historical events and anniversaries, such as when Polish politicians bring up the issue of Russia apologizing for the '39 invasion, the Katyn massacre (which scholars internationally see as genocide, but Russian officials refer to as a war crime instead), or for the ensuing decades of Soviet occupation; in turn, Russians criticize Poles' perceived lack of “thankfulness” for “liberation” from Nazi occupation. During the 1990s, assistance granted by Polish government and civilian agencies to members of the Chechen separatist movement had been met with criticism by Russian authorities. In 2009, there had been controversy over the Russian government and state media publishing claims that Poland, which signed non-aggression pacts with Soviet Union and Nazi Germany in the early 1930s, played a role in the partition of Czechoslovakia after the Munich Agreement and that Nazi Germany, the Empire of Japan and the Second Polish Republic had allied or intended to ally against the Soviet Union before the Second World War. These claims were denounced by Polish politicians and diplomats as an attempt at historical revision.

Other issues important in the recent Polish–Russian relations include the establishment of visas for Russian citizens, NATO plans for an anti-missile site in Poland, the Nord Stream 1 pipeline (Poland, which imports over 90 percent of oil and 60 percent of gas from Russia, continues to be concerned about its energy security which the pipeline threatens to undermine), Polish influence on the EU–Russian relations and various economic issues (e.g., the Russian ban on Polish food imports). Since the fall of the Soviet Union, with Lithuania, Ukraine and Belarus regaining independence, the Polish–Russian border has mostly been replaced by borders with the respective countries, but there still is a 210 km long border between Poland and the Kaliningrad Oblast.

According to a 2013 BBC World Service poll, 19% of Poles view Russia's influence positively while 49% express a negative view.

After 2017, most of the Soviet War Memorials in Poland were dismantled due to policy of decommunization.

=== 2008 Russo-Georgian war ===
During the 2008 Russian invasion of Georgia, Polish president Lech Kaczyński flew to the Georgian capital of Tbilisi as a show of support to the country. Kaczyński held a speech in front of the Georgian parliament in which he warned that Russia was trying to re-establish its dominance in the region by force. The Polish government afterwards led a group of eastern European countries in proposing sanctions against Russia, drawing anger from the Russian government.

=== 2010 plane crash ===
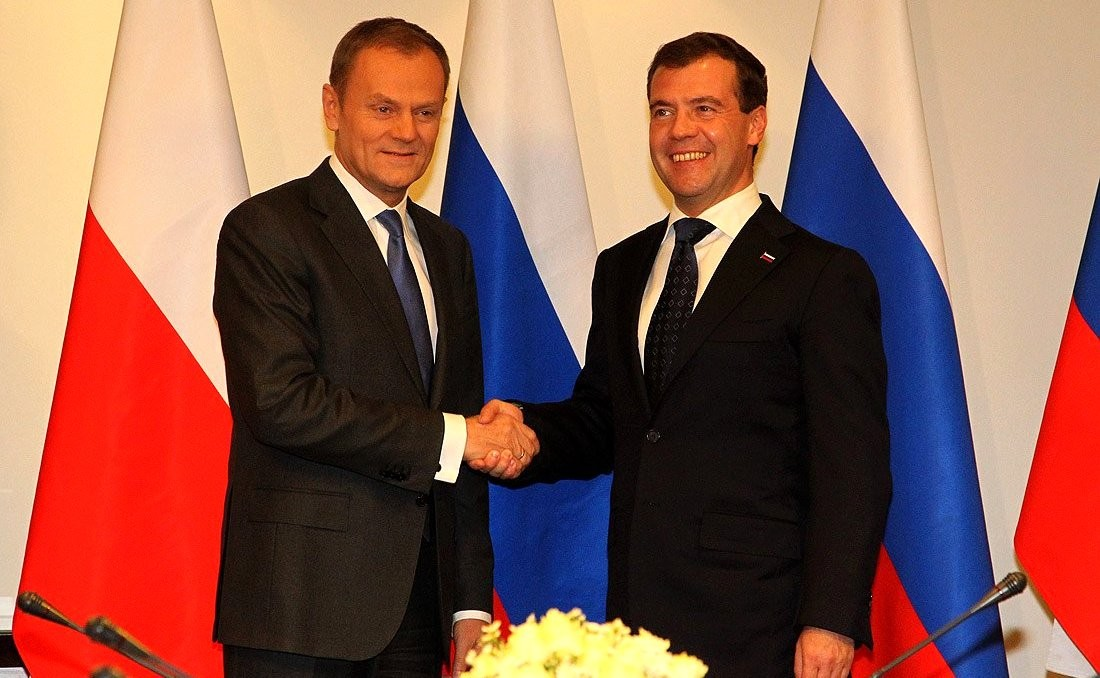
Dmitry Medvedev and then Polish prime minister Donald Tusk, 6 December 2010

BBC News reported that one of the main effects of the 2010 Polish Air Force Tu-154 crash would be the impact it has on Russian-Polish relations. It was thought if the inquiry into the crash were not transparent, it would increase suspicions toward Russia in Poland. The Wall Street Journal stated that the result of the joint declaration by Prime Ministers Vladimir Putin and Donald Tusk on Katyn on the verge of the crash, and the aftermath of Russia's response had united the two nations, and presented a unique opportunity at ending centuries of long rivalry and confrontation.

=== 2011 dialog centers ===
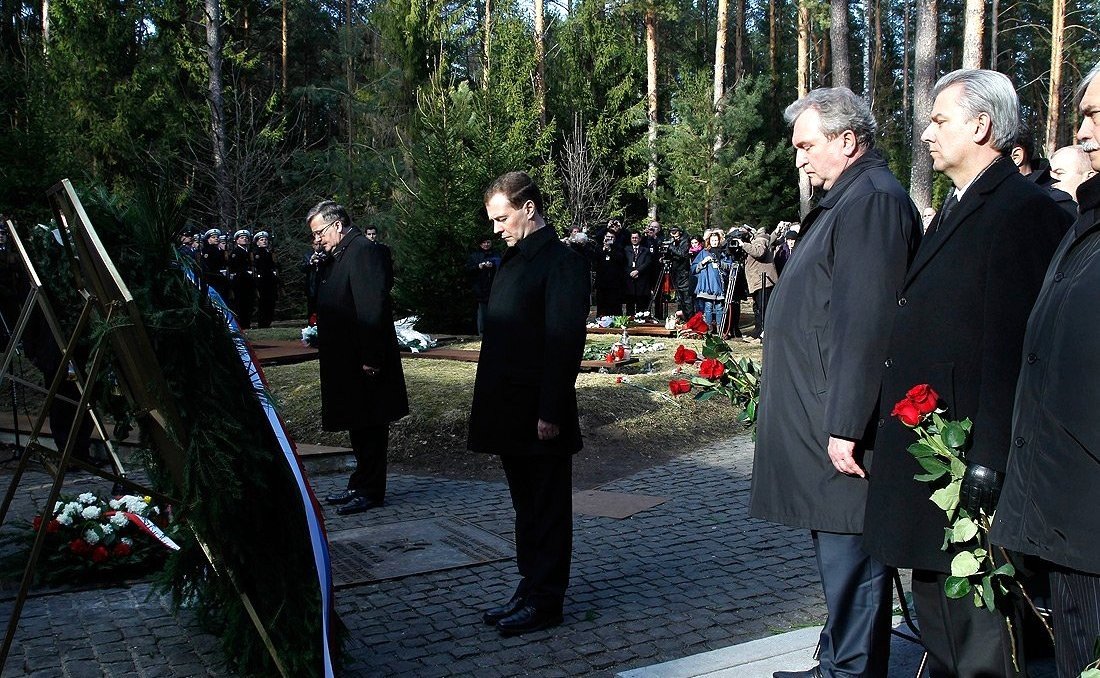
Russian president Dmitry Medvedev and Polish president Bronislaw Komorowski laying wreaths at the Katyn massacre memorial complex, 11 April 2011

Creation of parallel Polish and Russian dialogue centres was decided during President Medvedev's visit to Poland in December 2010. The Polish Centre for Polish-Russian Dialogue and Understanding supports cooperation of youth from both countries.

Russia has created parallel foundation called The Russian-Polish Center for Dialogue and Understanding, which does not fully cooperate with the Polish Centre. Its director, Juri Bondarenko, presents controversial opinions about Russian-Polish relations. The Foundation has organised a trip for Polish students to Russian-annexed Crimea, being aware the visit breaks Polish law.

=== 2014 airliner shootdown ===
Following the shootdown of Malaysia Airlines Flight 17 over the separatist Donetsk People's Republic in eastern Ukraine July 2014, the Polish government on 24 July cancelled the "Polish Year in Russia" and "Russian Year in Poland" that were planned for 2015.

=== Aftermath of the Russian annexation of Crimea ===
Poland has repeatedly requested the additional permanent deployment of NATO military assets to Poland following Russia's annexation of Crimea and its subsequent support of pro-Russian separatists in eastern Ukraine. In response to these events, Poland has been a staunch supporter of tougher sanctions against Russia by the EU. Poland's continued support of the new Ukrainian government and its criticism of Russian interference in the new Ukrainian government's affairs has angered Russia and increased tensions between both countries. On 30 July 2014, Russia banned the import of Polish fruits and vegetables amidst the Ukraine sanctions war. Russia's food hygiene authorities said that the imports had unacceptable levels of pesticide residues and nitrates. They earn Poland more than 1bn euros (£795m; $1.3bn) annually. Russia is Poland's biggest market for apples. The move follows EU sanctions against Russia over the Russo-Ukrainian war.

However, since the Russian annexation of Crimea, over 60–80% of Poles are worried about the possibility of a future conflict with Russia, given the fact that Russia maintains control of the Kaliningrad Oblast, directly bordering Poland.

=== Historical revisionism ===
Both Poland and Russia had accused each other for their historical revisionism. Russia has repeatedly accused Poland for not honoring Soviet Red Army soldiers fallen in World War II for Poland, notably in 2017, in which Poland was thought on "attempting to impose its own version of history" after Moscow was not allowed to join an international effort to renovate a World War II museum at Sobibór, site of the notorious Sobibor extermination camp. Meanwhile, Poland also accuses Russia for its unlimited historical distortion, notably back to 2014 when Putin signed a bill using any comparison of Nazi to Soviet war crimes as a punishment, as the Poles were also treated brutally by the Soviets; although Russia's historical revisionism might have influenced Poland's Andrzej Duda over its Nazi war crime laws; and Poland also has concerned that Russia's political and historical revisionism might put Poland at risk.

=== Poland–Russia gas disputes ===
As part of Poland's plans to become fully energy independent from Russia within the next years, Piotr Wozniak, president of state-controlled oil and gas company PGNiG, stated in February 2019: "The strategy of the company is just to forget about Eastern suppliers and especially about Gazprom." In 2020, the Stockholm Arbitral Tribunal ruled that PGNiG's long-term contract gas price with Gazprom linked to oil prices should be changed to approximate the Western European gas market price, backdated to 1 November 2014 when PGNiG requested a price review under the contract. Gazprom had to refund about $1.5 billion to PGNiG. The 1996 Yamal pipeline related contract is for up to 10.2 billion cubic metres of gas per year until it expired in 2022, with a minimum annual amount of 8.7 billion cubic metres. Following the 2021 global energy crisis, PGNiG made a further price review request on 28 October 2021. PGNiG stated the recent extraordinary increases in natural gas prices "provides a basis for renegotiating the price terms on which we purchase gas under the Yamal Contract." However, in April 2022, it was announced that Russia will suspend sending gas supplies to Bulgaria and Poland, in exchange for their refusal to pay in roubles. The Russian gas export monopoly, Gazprom is known to supply about 50% of Poland’s consumption. Poland stated that its gas storage is still 76% full and will not need to draw on its reserves.

=== Russian invasion of Ukraine ===
In the lead-up to the Russian invasion of Ukraine, Polish prime minister Mateusz Morawiecki warned that Russian president Vladimir Putin sought to rebuild the Russian Empire and urged Europe to unite and prevent Putin from making his dreams reality. On 22 February, after Putin recognized the independence of the Donetsk and Luhansk regions of Ukraine, Prime Minister Morawiecki called the action "an act of aggression against Ukraine," and Polish leaders urged European powers to adopt strong financial sanctions against Russia. Morawiecki singled out Germany's Nord Stream 2 gas pipeline from Russia as "harmful and dangerous."

After the 2022 Russian invasion of Ukraine started, Poland, as one of the EU countries, imposed sanctions on Russia, and Russia added all EU countries to the list of "unfriendly countries".

After the Russian invasion began on 24 February, Morawiecki tweeted, "We must immediately respond to Russia's criminal aggression on Ukraine Europe and the free world has to stop Putin."

On 26 February, the Polish Football Association announced that it would not participate in a planned 24 March 2022 FIFA World Cup qualifying match against Russia in Moscow. Poland joined other countries in spring 2022 in declaring a number of Russian diplomats persona non grata.

On 9 May, during VE Day, Russian Ambassador to Poland Sergey Andreev was splashed with red liquid by Ukrainian protestors of the invasion, as he arrived at a Soviet military cemetery in Warsaw for wreath-laying ceremony. The protestors prevented the Russian delegation from laying the wreath and shouted "murderers" and "fascists" at them, before the police escorted Andreev and his delegation away from the Soviet military cemetery. Russian Foreign Ministry spokeswoman Maria Zakharova denounced the attack and called the protestors "young neo-Nazis", and demanded Poland to organize without delay the wreath-laying ceremony while providing complete security. Polish Minister of Interior and Administration Mariusz Kaminski defended the protestors saying that their gathering was legal and claimed that the protestors' actions were understandable due to emotions of Ukrainian women present in the protests "whose husbands are fighting bravely in defense of their homeland".

A survey from June 22 noted that only 2% of Poles hold a favourable view of Russia, while 97% have an unfavourable opinion, which was the most negative views of Russia among all countries included in that international survey. The 2% view was a stark decrease from previous polls, which for the past two decades had about 20–40% of Poles expressing a favourable view of Russia.

In September 2022, Poland, Lithuania, Latvia, and Estonia decided to close entry for Russian citizens with Schengen visas, including those issued by third countries.

In October 2022, the Senate of Poland unanimously declared Russia as a terrorist state.

On November 2, 2022, Poland's Minister of National Defence Mariusz Błaszczak announced the construction of a barrier along the border with the Russian exclave of Kaliningrad, as Russia uses the border to illegally transport African and Asian immigrants to Europe.

Russia had failed to pay rent on a building in Warsaw and failed to vacate a building, despite a 2016 court order. After Poland took possession of these buildings, Russia announced it would close the Polish consulate in Smolensk in July 2023.

On September 10, 2025, Poland shot down multiple drones that entered its airspace during a large-scale Russian attack on Ukraine, marking the first known instance of a NATO member firing weapons during the Russian invasion of Ukraine. Polish authorities reported that 19 aerial objects had crossed into its territory, with those deemed a threat being destroyed. Prime Minister Donald Tusk described the incident as a "large-scale provocation," stated that the alliance takes the threat "very seriously," and invoked Article 4 of the North Atlantic Treaty to initiate consultations with NATO allies. Countries bordering Ukraine had previously reported occasional Russian missiles or drones entering their airspace during the war, but not on such a large scale, and they were not known to have shot them down. Several European officials, NATO, and EU foreign policy chief Kaja Kallas characterized the incursion as intentional and an escalation of the war in Ukraine. According to Ukrainian president Volodymyr Zelenskyy, at least eight Iranian-made Shahed drones had been aimed towards Poland, and "a strong response is needed." The operation involved NATO aircraft and surveillance assets, and no casualties were reported, though a house in Wyryki-Kolonia, about 16 kilometers (9.9 mi) from the Ukrainian border, was severely damaged. The incident prompted renewed calls within the European Union and NATO for strengthened air defenses and increased sanctions on Russia, with European Commission President Ursula von der Leyen urging further measures.

Following the 2026 Poland–Ukraine diplomatic crisis, leader of the Front party Krzysztof Tołwiński sent medical supplies for Russian soldiers, which his party purchased in Belarus.

== Russian intelligence and influence operations in Poland ==
The 1997 textbook Foundations of Geopolitics by a controversial Russian sociologist and philosopher Aleksandr Dugin, among other things, dwells upon the Eurasianism, and within Dugin's plans, Poland (as well as Latvia and Lithuania) would have a "special status" within the Eurasian-Russian sphere of influence. In 1996, Poland's prime minister Józef Oleksy resigned because of his links to Russian Foreign Intelligence Service agent Vladimir Alganov. In 2004 Polish intelligence recorded Vladimir Alganov talking about bribery of top Polish politicians.

In May 2023, Poland's Parliament voted for a law that will establish a commission to investigate alleged Russian influence during the period from 2007 to 2022.

Russian military exercises have practiced attacks against Poland. Exercise Zapad in September 2009 practiced a simulated nuclear attack against Poland, suppression of an uprising by a Polish minority in Belarus, and many operations of offensive nature.

== Trade ==
In 2021 Poland exported $8.83 billion worth of goods to Russia, the top product being computers. Russia exports to Poland were $12.7 billion with crude oil being the main product. Between 1995 and 2021 Polish exports rose by an average of 7.84% p.a. with Russian exports rising by an average of 7.92%.

EU sanctions and decisions taken by Russia and Poland, following the 2022 Russian invasion of Ukraine, means that imports of oil and gas from Russia have fallen, affecting the balance of trade between the two nations.

== Resident diplomatic missions ==
of Poland in Russia

- Moscow (Embassy)

of Russia in Poland

- Warsaw (Embassy)

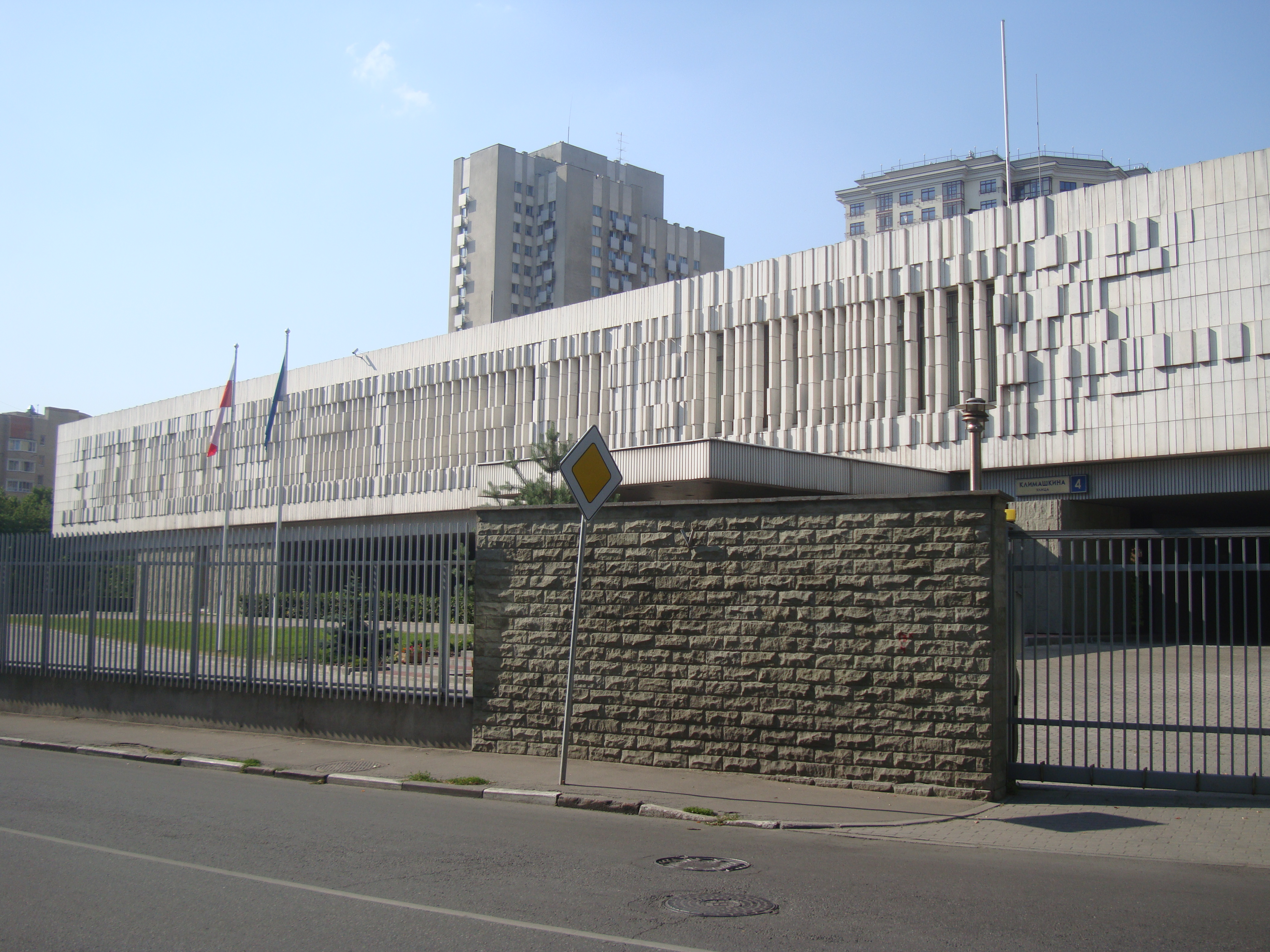
Embassy of Poland in Moscow

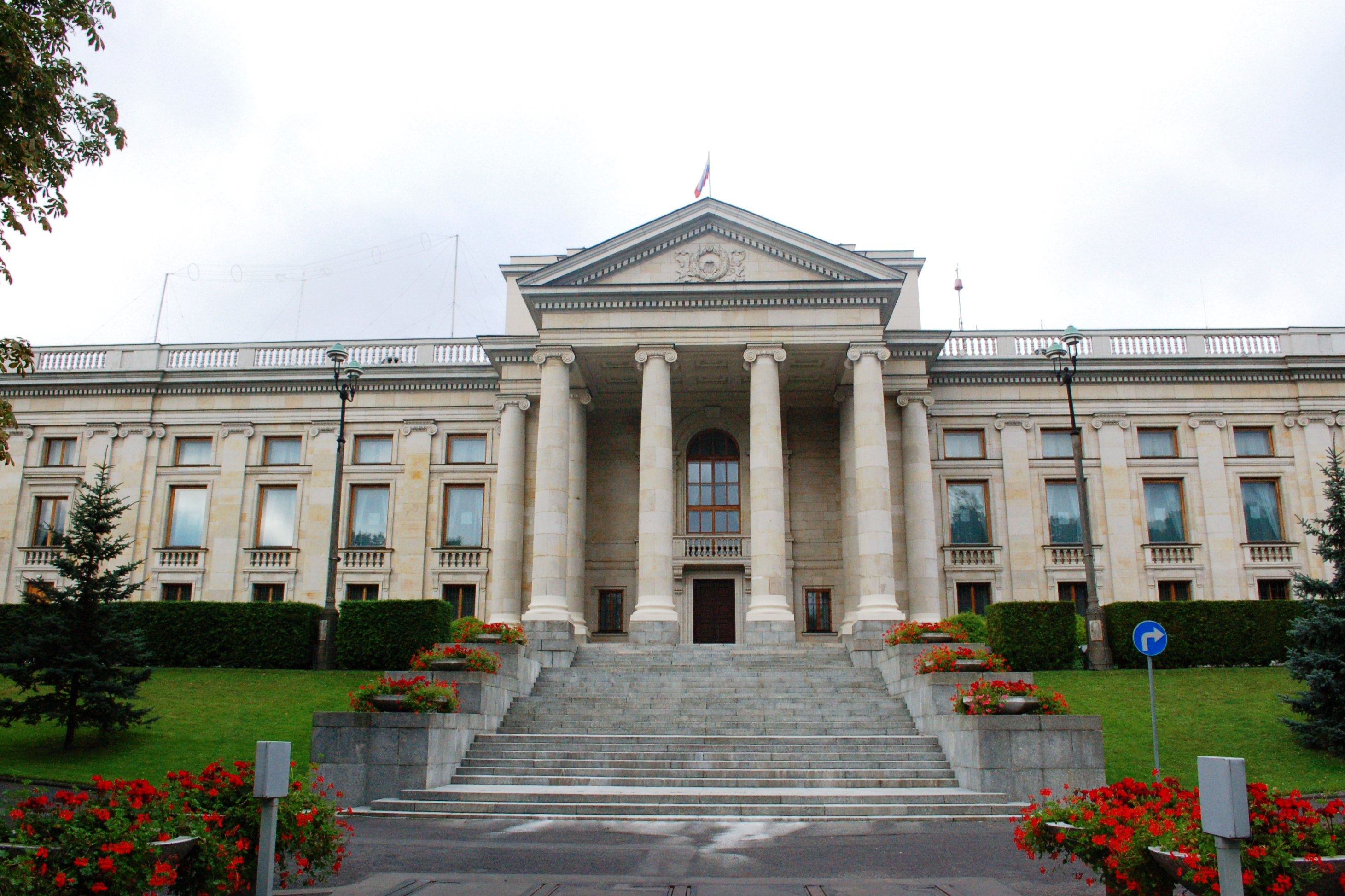
Embassy of Russia in Warsaw

== See also ==
- Poland–Soviet Union relations
- List of Ambassadors of Poland to Russia
- List of Ambassadors of Russia to Poland
- Foreign relations of the Soviet Union
- Anti-Katyń
- Augustów roundup
- Russification
- Russophobia
- Polonophobia
- Polish–Russian Wars
- Poland–Russia border
- Russia–EU relations
- Russians in Poland
- Poles in Russia
- Embassy of Poland, Moscow
- Embassy of Russia, Warsaw
