= Embassy of Poland, Moscow =

Embassy of the Republic of Poland in Moscow Ambasada Rzeczypospolitej Polskiej w Moskwie Посольство Республики Польша в Москве
- Address: Klimashkina 4, 123-557 Moscow
- Coordinates: 55°46′03″N 37°34′39″E
- Ambassador: Krzysztof Krajewski

The Embassy of Poland in Moscow is the diplomatic mission of the Republic of Poland to the Russian Federation. The chancery is located at Klimashkina Street 4, Moscow.

The Polish embassy occupies a purpose-built building of modernist design, incorporating Polish national motifs which is sited on a special diplomatic compound just outside Moscow's 'Garden Ring'. The compound is, in accordance with diplomatic protocol, considered part of the territory of the Polish Republic; for this reason the ambassador's residence as well as apartments for a number of other diplomatic staff are located there, alongside the chancery and consular buildings.

The embassy served as the primary target for groups wishing to express their disagreement with the directives of the late president Lech Kaczyński.

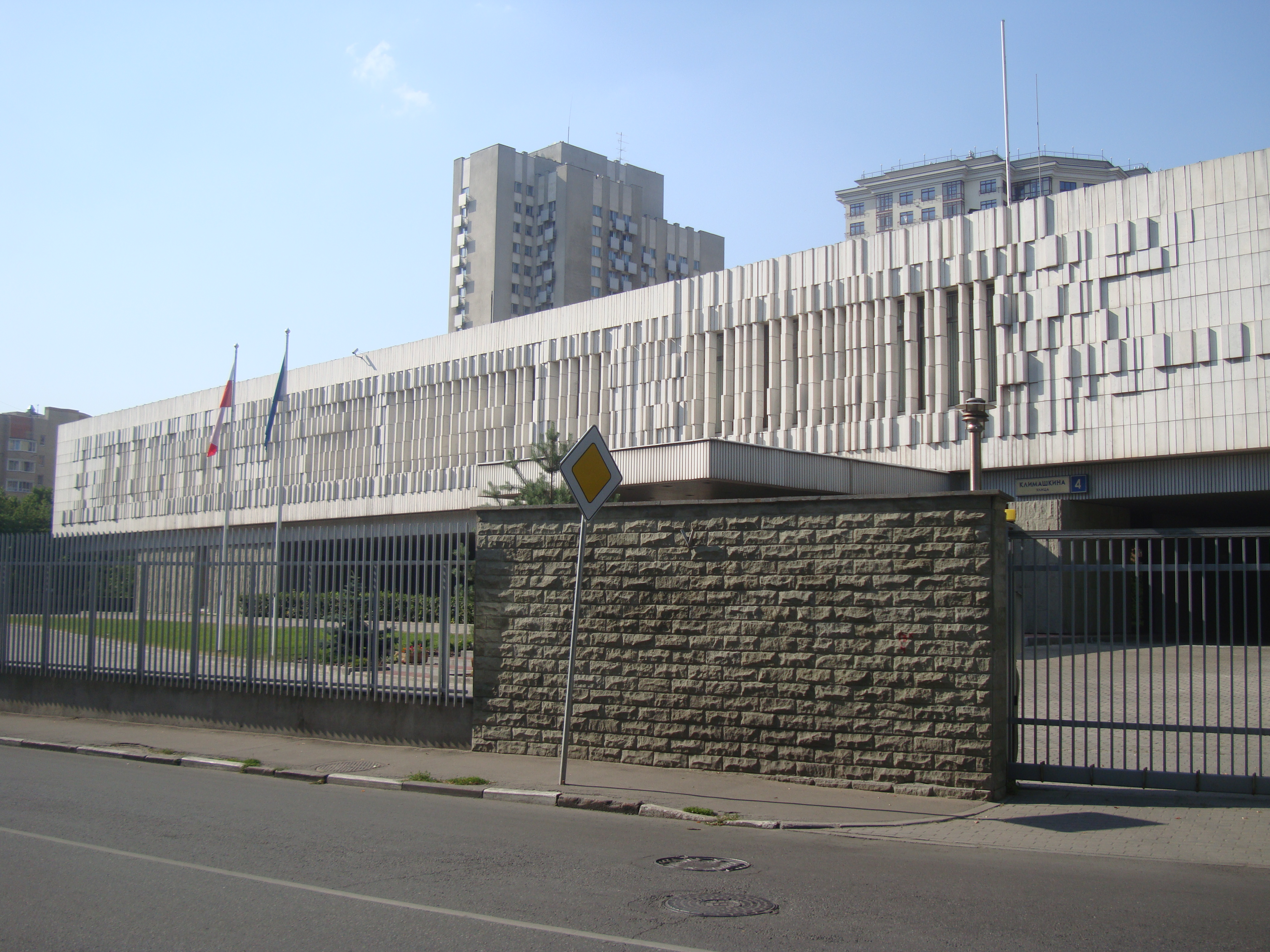
Polish Embassy complex in Moscow

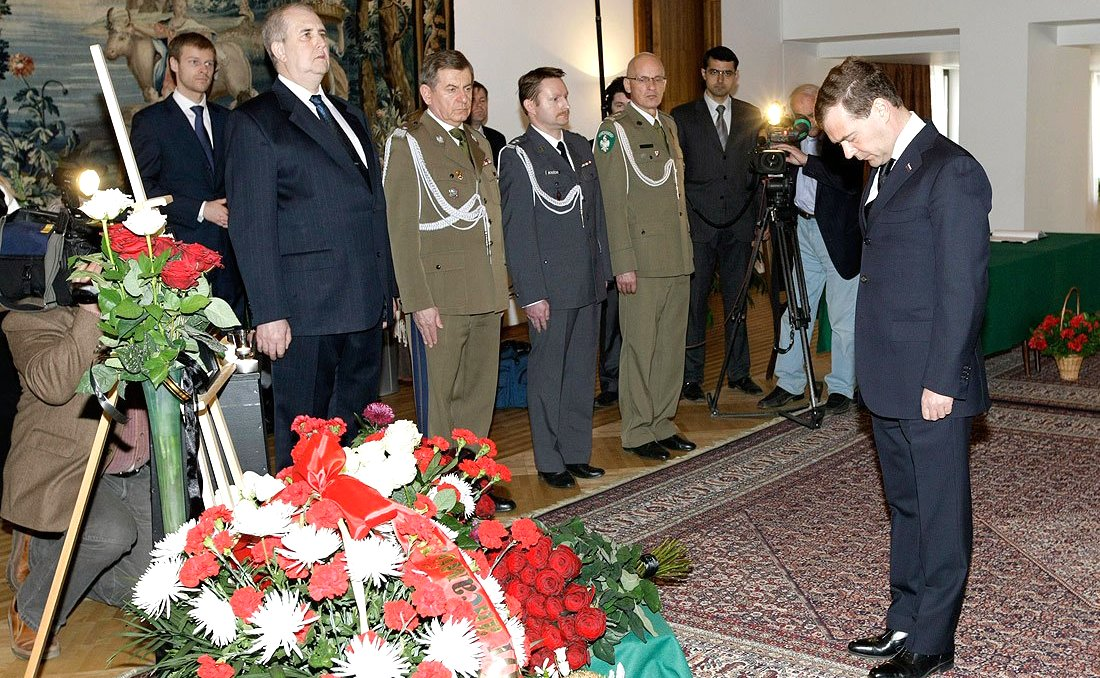
Russian president Dmitry Medvedev pays his respects to the victims of the 2010 Polish Government Tu-154 crash

== See also ==
- List of ambassadors of Poland to Russia
- Poland–Russia relations
- We will bury you
