= Ignacy Kluczewski =

Polish royal secretary

Lieutenant colonel The Honourable Ignacy Kluczewski
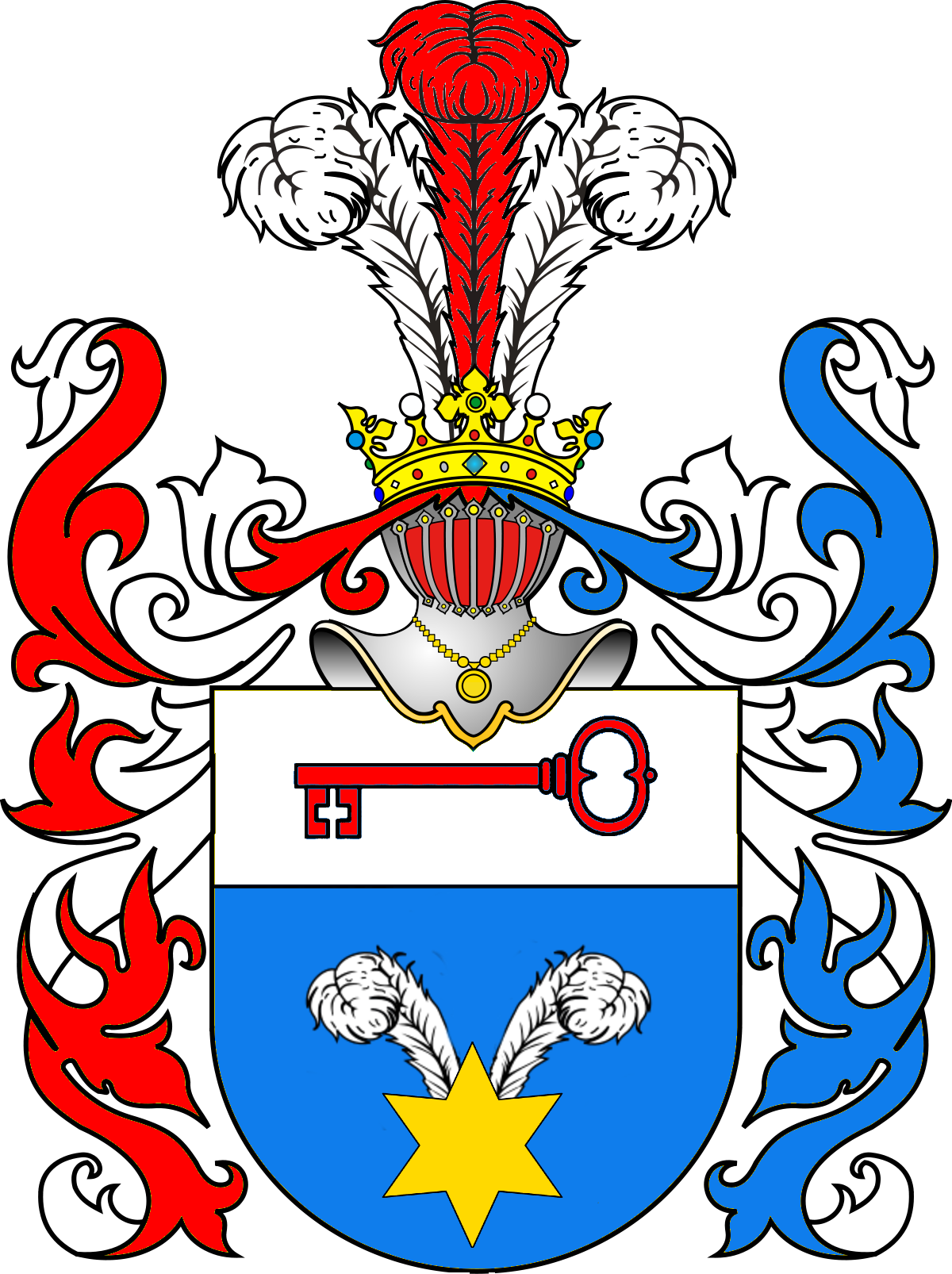
- Coat of arms: Ozdoba
- Born: c. 1730
- Died: Before 1793
- Noble family: Kluczewski
- Spouse: Anna Baudouin (m. 1775)
- Issue: Apolonia, Antoni, Józef, Roman and Stanisław
- Father: Jakub Kluczewski

Ignacy Kluczewski (c. 1730 – before 1793) was a Polish Royal Secretary to King Stanisław II Augustus of Poland. He was also the Crown Army military official and diplomat who served as a Polish–Lithuanian Commonwealth chargé d'affaires to Russian Empire.

== Biography ==
He was born as the son of Jakub in the family with the military traditions. In 1766 Holy Roman Emperor Joseph II conferred on him and his siblings hereditary status of untitled nobility of the Holy Roman Empire. In 1768 he was incorporated to the Polish nobility by the Parliament of the Polish–Lithuanian Commonwealth and was granted Ozdoba coat of arms. From January to February 1776 he was serving as a chief of a Polish diplomatic mission in the Russian Empire superseding Antoni Augustyn Deboli. During his short term in Saint Petersburg he was among others responsible for conducting encrypted correspondence with the Permanent Council.

== Family ==
On March 19, 1775, he married in the Holy Cross Church in Warsaw, Anna née Baudouin. They had five children: Apolonia, Antoni, Józef, Roman and Stanisław. Around 1777 Kluczewski family moved to Parfimowce (Parkhimovtsy in today's Belarus) in the Wielka Brzostowica parish (Vyalikaya Byerastavitsa in today's Belarus). He built there a classicist manor house. With time Kluczewski family built another manor house in the neighbouring Żebry village (Zhabry in today's Belarus). Wielka Brzostowica parish together with the manor houses in Parchimowce and Żebry served as the family nest of the descendants of Ignacy Kluczewski until 1939 when World War II broke out and the lands were incorporated into the Soviet Union.

== Bibliography ==
- Seweryn Uruski, Family. Herbarz szlachty polskiej, Warsaw 1910, volume VII, p. 7
- Group: 9243/D- Record books of the Roman Catholic parish of St. Krzyża in Warsaw, unit 118 Book of baptisms 1773–1777, sheets 278 and 417
- The wedding book of the parish of St. Cross in Warsaw from 1768 to 1784 (Latin), leaf 77v
- Adam Boniecki, Herbarz polski, Warszawa 1907, volume X, pp. 150–151
- Polish Biographical Dictionary, Warsaw 1964–1965, volume XIII
- Włodzimierz Roman Aftanazy, The history of residences in the former borderlands of the Republic of Poland, Warsaw 1994, volume III, pp. 109–110
