= Włodzimierz Marciniak =

Polish political scientist

Włodzimierz Marciniak Ph.D.
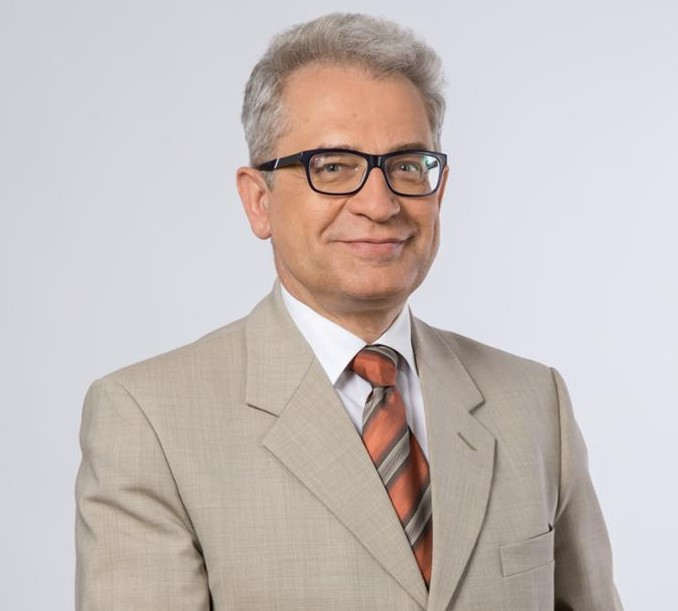

Poland Ambassador to Russia
- In office 13 October 2016 – 31 July 2020
- President: Andrzej Duda
- Preceded by: Katarzyna Pełczyńska-Nałęcz
- Succeeded by: Krzysztof Krajewski

Personal details
- Born: 31 March 1954 (age 72) Łódź
- Profession: Political scientist, historian, university teacher

Włodzimierz Aleksander Marciniak (born 31 March 1954, Łódź) is a Polish university teacher, political scientist and historian of Russia, an ambassador to Russia (2016–2020).

== Life ==
Marciniak, in 1976, graduated from political science at the University of Warsaw. From 1977 to 1980 he was doing his doctoral studies. In 1989, he defended his thesis on Marxist social philosophy, supervised by Marek Siemek. In 2001, he gained post-doctoral degree (habilitation), presenting a book on dissolution of the Soviet Union.

In 1980, he began his professional career as a scientist and university teacher at the Main School of Planning and Statistics in Warsaw (in 1991 renamed Warsaw School of Economics, SGH). Between 1992 and 1997 he was working as a counsellor at the Polish embassy in Moscow. In 1997, Marciniak returned to SGH, between 2001 and 2002 heading its Department of Political Studies. Since 2000, he has been working also for the Institute of Political Studies of the Polish Academy of Sciences. In 2002, he became head of the Comparative Postsoviet Research Unit. Between 2006 and 2008 he was a lecturer at the Centre for East European Studies, University of Warsaw. He has been a visiting professor of the Jesuit University of Philosophy and Education Ignatianum, Kraków, and Wyższa Szkoła Biznesu – National-Louis University, Nowy Sącz.

Marciniak has been a member of the Polish-Russian Group for Difficult Matters, and the presidential National Development Council (since 2010).

On 13 October 2016, he became Poland ambassador to Russia, presenting on 9 November 2016 his letter of credence. He ended his term on 31 July 2020.

His brother, Piotr Marciniak, was a member of Parliament of Poland (1993–1997), ambassador to Moldova (2000–2005), as well as consul-general in Irkutsk (2008–2009) and Saint Petersburg (2011–2015).

== Works ==
- Rozgrabione imperium: upadek Związku Sowieckiego i powstanie Federacji Rosyjskiej, Kraków: Arcana, 2001, 2004, ISBN 838622598X.
- Inne wymiary polityki, Warszawa: Instytut Studiów Politycznych Polskiej Akademii Nauk, 2013, ISBN 9788364091056.
