= Irena Lichnerowicz =

Polish diplomat

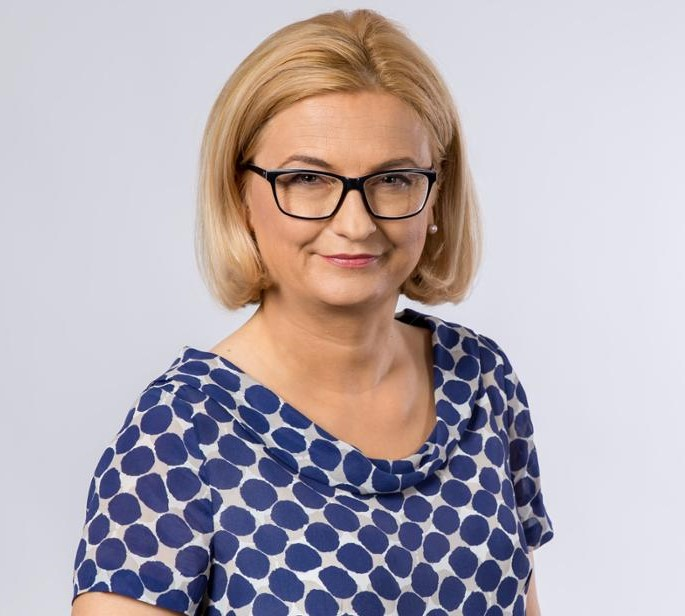

Poland Ambassador to Cyprus
- In office 5 September 2018 – 18 August 2023
- Appointed by: Andrzej Duda
- President: Nicos Anastasiades
- Preceded by: Barbara Tuge-Erecińska
- Succeeded by: Marek Szczepanowski

Director of the Diplomatic Protocol
- In office 2014–2018
- Appointed by: Grzegorz Schetyna
- Preceded by: Piotr Wojtczak
- Succeeded by: Krzysztof Krajewski

Personal details
- Born: 16 May 1974 (age 52) Brodnica
- Education: Nicolaus Copernicus University in Toruń; University of Bath
- Profession: diplomat

Irena Maria Lichnerowicz (born 16 May 1974, Brodnica) is a Polish diplomat who served as an ambassador of Poland to Cyprus between 5 September 2018 and 18 August 2023.

== Life ==
Irena Lichnerowicz has graduated from the English studies at the Nicolaus Copernicus University in Toruń. She also studied at the Université d’Angers (Lettres et Sciences Humaines) and did her MA at University of Bath from European Studies-Euromasters programme.

In 1999 she started her career at the Chancellery of the President of the Republic of Poland, initially as an expert in the Foreign Affairs Office and then senior expert in the Presidential Protocol Division. In 2005 she began her diplomatic career at the Ministry of Foreign Affairs. Since December 2014 until 2018 she was the director of the Diplomatic Protocol. She was responsible for organizing and coordinating such events as NATO Summit in Warsaw in 2016 and World Youth Days in 2016. On 5 September she became ambassador to Cyprus. She presented her credentials on 14 November 2018. She ended her term on 18 August 2023, and returned to the position of the director of the Diplomatic Protocol.

Besides Polish, she can speak English, French, Italian, and to some extent, German and Russian languages. She is married, with one daughter.

== Honours ==
- Silver Cross of Merit (Poland, 2012)
- Officer's Cross of the Order of Leopold II (Belgium, 2004)
- Cross of Merit with Ribbon of the Order of Merit (Germany, 2005)
- Commander of the Order of the Lion of Finland (Finland, 2015)
- Grand Officer of the Order of the Crown (Belgium 2015)
- Commander of the Order of Merit of the Republic of Italy (Italy, 2014)
- Commander's Cross of the Royal Norwegian Order of Merit (Norway, 2016)
- Grand Commander of the Order of Makarios III (Cyprus, 2021)
- Medal of the Centenary of Regained Independence (Poland, 2021)
