= Andrzej Załucki =

Polish diplomat

Poland Ambassador to Russia
- In office 1996–2002
- Preceded by: Stanisław Ciosek
- Succeeded by: Stefan Meller

Poland Ambassador to the Czech Republic
- In office November 2005 – March 2006
- Preceded by: Andrzej Krawczyk
- Succeeded by: Jan Pastwa

Personal details
- Born: September 2, 1941 (age 85) Kołomyja
- Children: 1 son
- Education: Pedagogical University of Cracow
- Profession: Diplomat

Andrzej Załucki (born 2 September 1941 in Kolomyia, Ukrainian SSR) is a Polish diplomat and former Deputy Minister of Foreign Affairs (2002–2005). He served as Ambassador to the Russian Federation from 1996 to 2002 and to the Czech Republic from 2005 to 2006. He was deputy director in the political office of the Prime Minister 1995–1996.

In 2004, he received the Order of Prince Yaroslav the Wise, 5th class.
