= Sławomir Dębski =

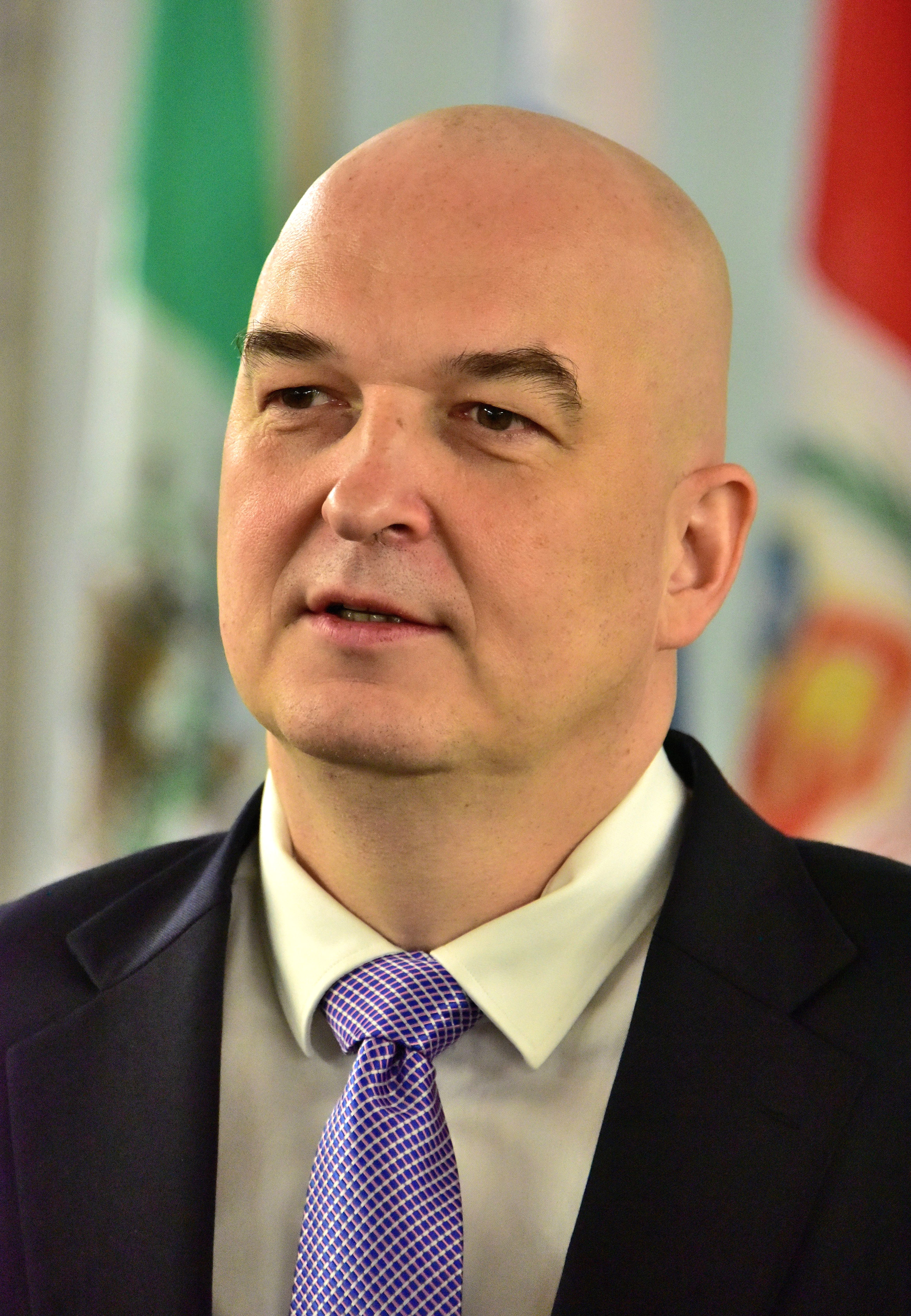
- Born: Sławomir Jan Dębski; 23 May 1971 (age 55); Kraków, Poland
- Education: Jagiellonian University; Central European University
- Employer(s): Polish Institute of International Affairs (2007–2010; 2016–2024); Cardinal Stefan Wyszyński University in Warsaw (2007–2010); University of Warsaw (2010–2014)

Sławomir Jan Dębski (born 23 May 1971) is a Polish historian who has served as director of Polish Institute of International Affairs from 2007 until 2010 and again from 2016 until 2024. He previously headed The Centre for Polish-Russian Dialogue and Understanding (2011–2016), and was a member of the Polish-Russian Group for Difficult Matters. He was assistant professor of the Cardinal Stefan Wyszyński University in Warsaw (2007–2010) and Warsaw University (2010–2014). Furthermore, he is a presenter at Kanal Zero.

== Life ==
In 1996 he graduated from the Faculty of History of Jagiellonian University. He also studied at the Department of History of Central European University in Budapest and obtained a Master's degree in Central European History in 1994. In 2002 he obtained a Doctor of Humanities degree in the field of History from the Faculty of History of Jagiellonian University.

Dębski is a foreign policy expert and an advisor to all Poland's governments since 2000, a team leader, institution builder and interagency communication expert. He joined the Polish Institute of International Affairs (PISM) in 2000 as a Russia foreign policy analyst, then served at PISM as Eastern Europe research coordinator, head of the Research Office (2002–2007), deputy director and ultimately, for the first time, director (2007–2010). In 2008, he was nominated to the Polish-Russian Group for Difficult Matters (2008–2016). In 2010, he became a special appointee of the Minister of Culture and National Heritage for the establishment of the Center for Polish-Russian Dialogue and Understanding (CPRDiP), responsible for drafting an act of the Parliament and legislation procedures. In September 2011 he was appointed a director of CPRDiP. In February 2016, he was appointed a director of PISM for the second time. In this capacity he was a head of NATO Warsaw Summit Experts' Forum 2017 organization team, combining different domestic and international stakeholders. In June 2024, he ended his term as a director of PISM.

Since 2019, Dębski has been serving on the Transatlantic Task Force of the German Marshall Fund and the Bundeskanzler-Helmut-Schmidt-Stiftung (BKHS), co-chaired by Karen Donfried and Wolfgang Ischinger. Since 1 February 2024, he has been co-hosting the program "Ground Zero" with General Rajmund Andrzejczak on Kanał Zero.

== Writings ==
Dębski served as editor-in-chief of Polski Przegląd Dyplomatyczny (Polish Diplomatic Review) and the Russian-language quarterly Evropa. He has also edited collections of Polish diplomatic documents and published works on diplomatic history and international relations.

His monograph Między Berlinem a Moskwą. Stosunki niemiecko-sowieckie 1939–1941 (Between Berlin and Moscow: German-Soviet Relations in 1939–1941) was first published in Polish in 2003, with a revised second edition appearing in 2007. The book received the Przegląd Wschodni Award in 2003 and the second-degree Klio Award in the scholarly monograph category in 2004. Historian R. C. Raack reviewed the book in The Russian Review in 2004. An English edition, Between Berlin and Moscow: German-Soviet Relations in 1939–1941, was published by De Gruyter Oldenbourg in 2025.

Zbigniew Brzezinski described the work as a "top-notch reconstruction" of relations between Nazi Germany and the Soviet Union, praising its analysis of the origins and strategic mechanisms of the German-Soviet war. Former Polish Minister of Foreign Affairs Adam Daniel Rotfeld praised Dębski's use of previously unknown documents and his examination of the motivations behind the Molotov–Ribbentrop Pact and Operation Barbarossa.

== Book ==
- Między Berlinem a Moskwą. Stosunki niemiecko-sowieckie 1939–1941, PISM, Warsaw 2003; corrected second edition 2007 (Between Berlin and Moscow. German-Soviet relationships 1939–1941).
