= List of ambassadors of Poland to Cyprus =

Poland Ambassador to Cyprus
- Ambasador Rzeczypospolitej Polskiej na Cyprze
- Coat of arms of Poland

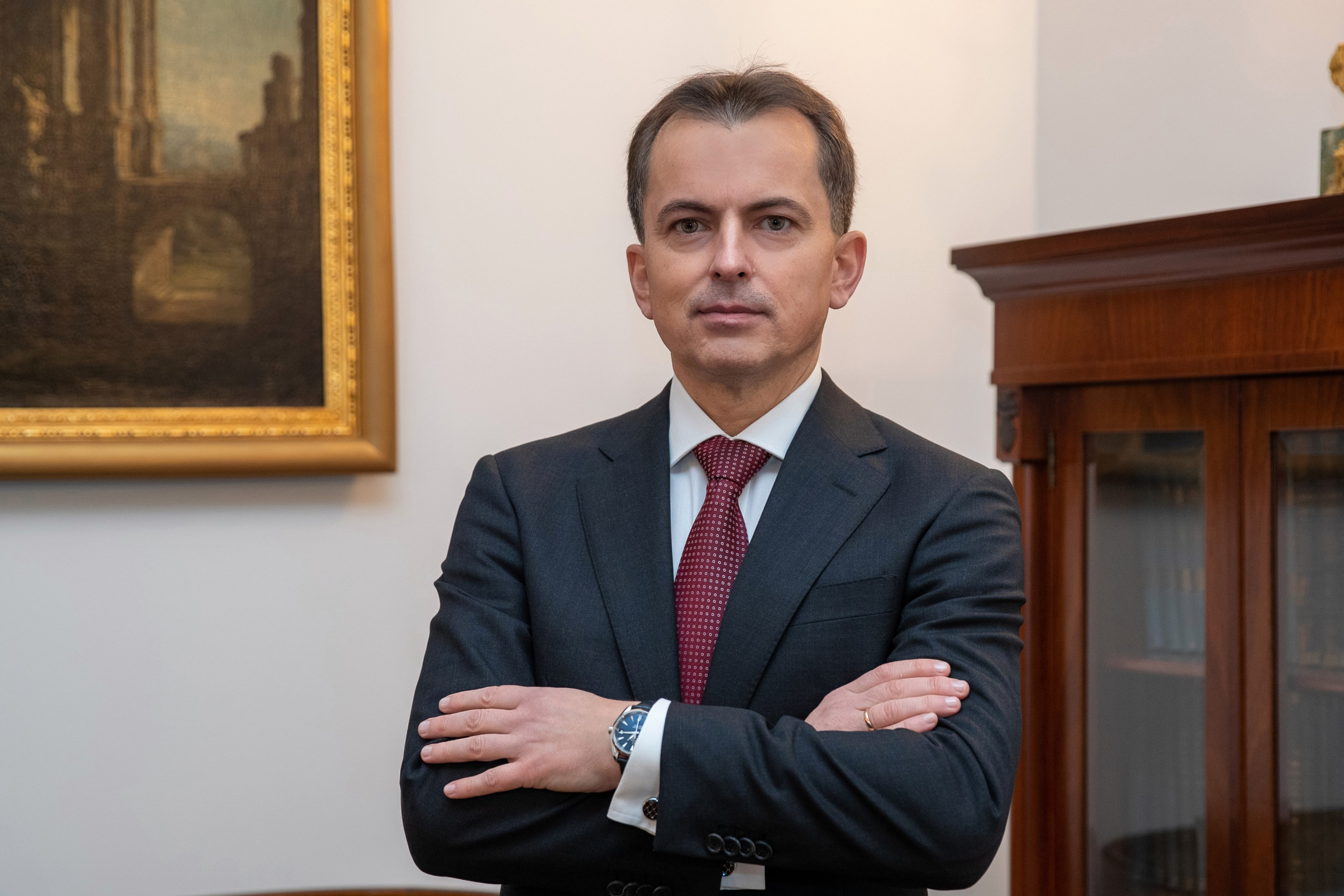
- Incumbent; Marek Szczepanowski since 2023
- Style: Mr. Ambassador (informal); His Excellency (diplomatic)
- Reports to: Polish Ministry of Foreign Affairs
- Seat: Nicosia, Cyprus
- Appointer: President of Poland
- Term length: No fixed term
- Website: Embassy of Poland, Cyprus

The Republic of Poland Ambassador to Cyprus is the leader of the Poland delegation, Poland Mission to Cyprus.

As with all Poland Ambassadors, the ambassador to Cyprus is nominated by the President of Poland and confirmed by the Parliamentary Commission of the Foreign Affairs. The ambassador serves at the pleasure of the president, and enjoys full diplomatic immunity. On August 16, 1960, Cyprus gained its independence from the United Kingdom. Poland established diplomatic relations with Cyprus on January 15, 1961.

Poland does not recognize the Turkish Republic of Northern Cyprus, proclaimed November 15, 1983, by Turkey.

Poland Embassy in Cyprus is located in Nicosia.

== List of ambassadors of Poland to Cyprus ==
=== Polish People's Republic ===
- 1961-1963: Zygmunt Dworakowski (envoy)
- 1963-1966: Wiktor Mokoszko (chargé d’affaires)
- 1966-1968: Henryk Golański
- 1968-1971: Zygmunt Goć (chargé d’affaires)
- 1971-1973: Tadeusz Wujek
- 1973-1974: Wacław Zalewski (chargé d’affaires)
- 1974-1978: Stanisław Goliszek (chargé d’affaires)
- 1978-1982: Władysław Wieczorek (chargé d’affaires)
- 1982-1984: Janusz Lewandowski
- 1984-1988: Józef Tejchma
- 1988-1989: Bolesław Fedorowicz (chargé d’affaires)

=== Third Polish Republic ===
- 1989-1992: Janusz Lewandowski
- 1992-1993: Ryszard Żółtaniecki
- 1993-1997: Janusz Jesionek (chargé d’affaires)
- 1997-2000: Wojciech Lamentowicz
- 2000-2003: Tomasz Lis
- 2004-2008: Zbigniew Szymański
- 2008-2014: Paweł Dobrowolski
- 2014-2018: Barbara Tuge-Erecińska
- 2018-2023: Irena Lichnerowicz-Augustyn
- since 2023: Marek Szczepanowski
