= Marek Szczepanowski =

Polish diplomat

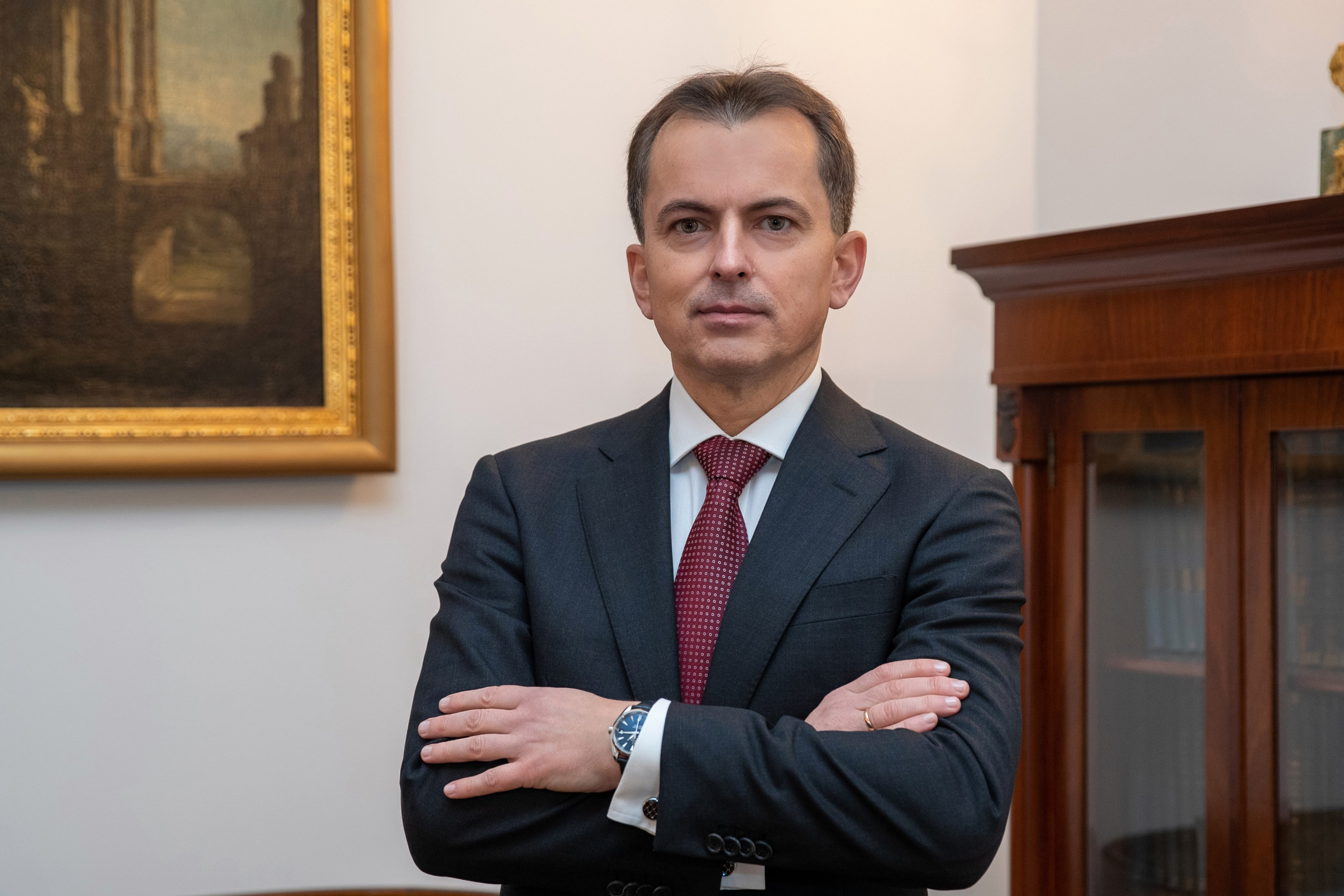
- Marek Szczepanowski (2023)

Poland Ambassador to Cyprus
- Incumbent
- Assumed office September 2023
- Appointed by: Andrzej Duda
- President: Nikos Christodoulides
- Preceded by: Irena Lichnerowicz-Augustyn

Personal details
- Born: 4 June 1972 (age 54) Sochaczew
- Children: 2
- Education: University of Warsaw; National School of Public Administration
- Profession: diplomat, civil servant

Marek Szczepanowski (born 4 June 1972, Sochaczew) is a Polish diplomat and civil servant who serves as an ambassador of Poland to Cyprus since September 2023.

== Life ==
Szczepanowski has graduated cum laude from International Relations at the University of Warsaw and from the National School of Public Administration (1999–2001). He studied also post-graduate National Security Studies at the University of Warsaw.

He started his professional career at the Office of the Committee for European Integration. In 2001, he joined the Ministry of Foreign Affairs (MFA), initially as an expert for relations with European Union. He was posted at the Consulate General in Milan, Italy, at the Political Unit of the Embassy in Rome as a counsellor, and at the Polish Institute in Rome as a deputy director. He received the diplomatic rank of Minister-Counsellor.

Following his return to Warsaw in 2010, he held the post of deputy director and director of the Bureau of Archives and Information Management. He was responsible there, among others, for the preparation and implementation of the first Electronic Document Management System, new visualization of the MFA and foreign missions, and coordination of the reform of workflow of classified documents at the MFA. Since 2018, he was deputy director and director of the Department of Public and Cultural Diplomacy. Between April 2021 and August 2023 he was director of the Diplomatic Protocol.

On 11 August 2023, he was nominated ambassador to Cyprus. He took the post in September 2023.

Besides Polish, he speaks English, Italian, and German languages. He is married, with two children.

== Honours ==
- Medal of the Centenary of Regained Independence (Poland, 2022)
- Commander of the Order for Merits to Lithuania (Lithuania, 2023)
- Grand Commander of the Order of Makarios III (Cyprus)
