= Andrzej Nowak (historian) =

Polish historian (born 1960)

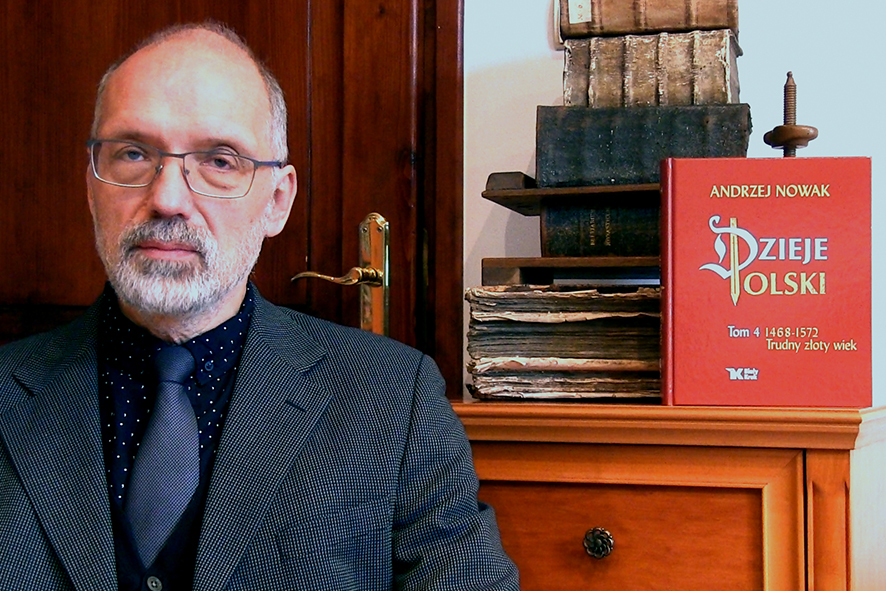
- Portrait of Nowak alongside his opus magnum Dzieje Polski (transl. The History of Poland), 2019
- Born: 1960 (age 65–66); Cracow, Poland
- Occupations: historian and opinion journalist
- Organizations: Jagiellonian University; Institute of History of the Polish Academy of Sciences; The Centre for Polish-Russian Dialogue and Understanding; Institute of National Remembrance
- Awards: Order of the White Eagle

Andrzej Witold Nowak (born 1960 in Cracow) is a Polish historian, public intellectual and author of the multi-volume history of Poland. He is a Knight of the Order of the White Eagle, Poland’s highest national honour.

== Life and work ==
Nowak is a professor at the Institute of History, Jagiellonian University and at the Institute of History of the Polish Academy of Sciences (PAN) in Warsaw, where he is the head of the Section for the History of Eastern Europe and the Empires of the 19th and 20th Centuries. He also teaches (since 2016) at the College of Europe in Natolin. He lectured as a visiting professor at several universities in a variety of countries including: in the United States ( Columbia University, Harvard University, Rice University), Great Britain (University of Cambridge, University College of London), Canada, Ireland, Japan and the Czech Republic.

He was the co-founder and for many years (1994–2012) chief editor of the conservative cultural-political magazine Arcana. He cooperates with the monthly Wpis regularly and is one of the main authors of the publishing house Biały Kruk.

Nowak has published over 40 books (sold in almost a million copies) and more than 200 historical publications (articles and studies) in scientific periodicals and dozens of articles, reviews and interviews.

His main research areas are: cultural and political history of Eastern Europe in the 19th and 20th century; political philosophy; international political relations; modern mass-media. He has published several books about the Polish-Russian relations. He is currently the president of the Advisory Council of The Centre for Polish-Russian Dialogue and Understanding, as well as a member of the Council of Poland's Institute of National Remembrance. Due to his expertise in history and modern politics he is a frequent guest of radio programs and talk-shows.

Between 1980 and 1988, Nowak was involved in anti-Communist journalistic and educational activities. He published numerous articles in samizdat periodicals, including Arka, Miesięcznik Małopolski, Alternatywy, and Tumult. From 1980 to 1981, he was a member of the Independent Students’ Association (NZS) and served as a delegate to its convention at Jagiellonian University. During the period of martial law in Poland, he co-organized the underground Free Jagiellonian University and collaborated with the Christian Workers’ University established by Father Kazimierz Jancarz in Kraków-Nowa Huta, both of which organized alternative lectures, including history courses for workers. From 1988 to 1991, he was active in the Solidarity movement at Jagiellonian University and served on the university’s Solidarity Workers’ Commission in 1990–1991. He also participated in two international human rights conferences, held in Kraków-Mistrzejowice in 1989 and Leningrad in 1990.

Nowak is known in particular for his monumental History of Poland (Dzieje Polski). As of August 2026, he has completed seven of the planned twelve volumes.

He holds conservative views. In 2005, Nowak joined the honorary committee supporting Lech Kaczyński’s presidential campaign and later regularly participated in seminars organized by President Kaczyński in Lucień. During the 2010 presidential election, he served on the honorary committee supporting Jarosław Kaczyński. His commentaries and interviews on Eastern European history and contemporary issues appear regularly in Polish media, and occasionally in foreign journals, such as Le Figaro, L’Opinion, The Times, Die Welt, The Spectator, or The New Yorker. He is a member of the Academic Civic Club of President Lech Kaczyński in Poznań. In October 2024, he joined Kanał Zero, one of Poland’s largest YouTube channels, with more than two million subscribers, where he regularly presents popular lectures on history.

On 24 November 2024, at a Civic Congress organized by Law and Justice in Kraków, Nowak announced Karol Nawrocki as the party-supported non-partisan candidate in the 2025 Polish presidential election. He was also appointed chairman of the Civic Support Committee for Nawrocki, who went on to win the election. International media described Nowak as Karol Nawrocki’s kingmaker. In August 2025 he was nominated honorary advisor to the new President of Poland, Karol Nawrocki.

Nowak has received several awards and honors, including the Order of the White Eagle Poland's highest state distinction.

Andrzej Nowak is married and has two children.

== Main works ==
- Między carem i rewolucją. Studium wyobraźni politycznej i postaw Wielkiej Emigracji wobec Rosji, 1831–1849 (Between Tsar and Revolution. A Study of Political Imagination and Attitudes of the Polish Great Emigration, 1831–1849), Warszawa 1994, 370 pp;
- Jak rozbić rosyjskie imperium? Idee polskiej polityki wschodniej, 1733-1921 (How to break up the Russian Empire? Ideas of the Polish Eastern Policy, 1733–1921), Warszawa 1995, 270 pp.
- Kronika Polski, Wydawnictwo Kluszczyński, Kraków 1997.
- Polacy, Rosjanie i biesy. Studia i szkice historyczne z XIX i XX w. (Poles, Russians, and demons. Historical studies and essays from the 19th and 20th centuries), Kraków 1998, 270 pp.
- Ojczyzna Ocalona. Wojna sowiecko-polska 1919-1920, Wydawnictwo Biały Kruk, Kraków 2010.
- Imperium a ti druzi. Rusko, Polsko a moderni dĕjiny východni Evropy, CDK, Brno 2010.
- Hołd Katyński, Wydawnictwo Biały Kruk, Kraków 2010.
- Hołd Katyński II, Wydawnictwo Biały Kruk, Kraków 2011.
- Czas walki z Bogiem. Kościół na straży wolności Polaków, Wydawnictwo Biały Kruk, Kraków 2011.
- Krzyż polski. Patriotyzm i męczeństwo, Wydawnictwo Biały Kruk, Kraków 2011.
- Strachy i Lachy. Przemiany polskiej pamięci, Wydawnictwo Biały Kruk, Kraków 2012.
- Dzieje Polski. Skąd nasz ród, t.1, Wydawnictwo Biały Kruk, Kraków 2014.
- Dzieje Polski. Od rozbicia do nowej Polski, t.2, Wydawnictwo Biały Kruk, Kraków 2016.
- Uległość czy niepodległość, Wydawnictwo Biały Kruk, Kraków 2014.
- Wygaszanie Polski 1989-2015, Wydawnictwo Biały Kruk, Kraków 2015.
- Pierwsza zdrada Zachodu. 1920 - zapomniany appeasement, Wydawnictwo Literackie, Kraków 2015
- Historia i Polityka, Wydawnictwo Biały Kruk, Kraków 2016.
- Polskość jest przywilejem, Wydawnictwo Biały Kruk, Kraków 2016.
- Dzieje Polski. Królestwo zwycięskiego Orła, t. 3, Wydawnictwo Biały Kruk, Kraków 2017.
- Metamorfozy Imperium Rosyjskiego 1721-1921. Geopolityka, ody i narody, Wydawnictwo Literackie 2018.
- Niepodległa! 1864-1924. Jak Polacy odzyskali Ojczyznę, Wydawnictwo Biały Kruk, Kraków 2018.
- Filary Niepodległości, Wydawnictwo Biały Kruk, Kraków 2018.
- Kościół na straży polskiej niepodległości (wspólnie z Martyną Deszczyńską), Wydawnictwo Biały Kruk, Kraków 2018.
- O historii nie dla idiotów. Rozmowy i przypadki, Wydawnictwo Literackie, Kraków 2019.
- Dzieje Polski. Trudny złoty wiek, t. 4, Wydawnictwo Biały Kruk, Kraków 2019.
- Klęska Imperium Zła. Rok 1920 (The defeat of the Evil Empire. The year 1920), Wydawnictwo Biały Kruk, Kraków 2020.
- Między nieładem a niewolą. Krótka historia myśli politycznej (Between disorder and slavery. A short history of political thought), Wydawnictwo Biały Kruk, Kraków 2020.
- Chluba i zguba. Antologia najnowszej publicystyki patriotycznej (Glory and loss. An anthology of the latest patriotic opinion journalism), Wydawnictwo Biały Kruk, Kraków 2020.
- Dzieje Polski. Imperium Rzeczypospolitej, t. 5 (The history of Poland (volume 5). The Commonwealth's empire), Wydawnictwo Biały Kruk, Kraków 2021.
- Polska i Rosja. Sąsiedztwo wolności i despotyzmu X–XXI w., Wydawnictwo Biały Kruk, Kraków 2022.
- Dzieje Polski. Potop i ogień, t. 6, Wydawnictwo Biały Kruk, Kraków 2023, ISBN 978-83-7553-394-1.
- Dzieje Polski. Upadanie i powstawanie, t. 7, Wydawnictwo Biały Kruk, Kraków 2025, ISBN 978-83-7553-445-0.
- Skąd się wziął Karol Nawrocki. Rozmowy z prezydentem RP, Wydawnictwo Biały Kruk 2026, ISBN 978-83-7553-467-2.

=== Works in Translation ===
- History and Geopolitics. A Contest for Eastern Europe, Warszawa 2008.
- Imperiological Studies. A Polish Perspective, Kraków 2011.
- The Forgotten Appeasement of 1920. Lloyd-George, Lenin and Poland, Routledge, London-New York 2023, 408 p. ISBN 9781032434636.
- Poland and Russia. The Neighborhood of Freedom and Despotism in the X-XXI Centuries, Kraków, Polska Fundacja Humanistyczna im. Wincentego Kadłubka 2023, 448 p., ISBN 978-83-7553-375-0.
- The History of Poland, Vol. I-V, transl. Jan Czarniecki a.o., Polska Fundacja Humanistyczna im. Wincentego Kadłubka, Kraków 2023, ISBN 978-83-7553-383-5, 978-83-7553-384-2, 978-83-7553-385-9, 978-83-7553-386-6, 978-83-7553-387-3.
- Das vergessene Appeasement von 1920: Lloyd George, Lenin und Polen, tłum. Markus Krzoska, De Gruyter Oldenbourg, 2024, 437 p. ISBN 978-3-111-33143-0.
- Means and Ways of Empires: ideologies and Political Practices of the Russian/Soviet/Russian States Between 1689 and 2022, ed. Andrzej Nowak with collaboration of Łukasz Dryblak), Wyd. Instytutu Historii PAN: Warszawa 2024, pp. 506, ISBN 978-83-66911-81-9.
- Russian Empires: Deaths and Transfigurations. Mentalities, Ideologies, and Fears (1913-2023), transl. Teresa Baluk-Ulewiczowa a.o, Göttingen: Brill-Schöningh 2026, 294 p., ISBN 978-3-506-70537-2.
- Spatial Dimensions of Russian and Soviet Imperial Ideologies and Practices (1689–2024), ed. by Andrzej Nowak, Göttingen: Brill-Schöningh 2026, 512 p., ISBN 978-3-506-70536-5.

== Awards ==
- POLCUL (Polish Cultural Foundation) Award in Journalism (in underground publications during the martial law in Poland), 1989;
- Przegląd Wschodni (Eastern Review) Award for the best book on Eastern European History, 1995;
- CLIO Awards (by Commission of the Polish Historical Books Editors) for the best book on history published in Poland, 1994, 1995 and 1998;
- Jerzy Lojek Foundation/Institute of Joseph Piłsudski in New York Award for the whole output, 1999;
- Silver Cross of Merit, 2003;
- Book of the Year for the first volume of Dzieje Polski, 2014;
- Józef Mackiewicz Prize for Outstanding Literature for the first volume of Dzieje Polski, 2015;
- Order of Polonia Restituta Third Class, Krzyż Komandorski, the Commander's Cross, 2016;
- Kazimierz Moczarski Historical Award (Nagroda Historyczna im. Kazimierza Moczarskiego), 2016;
- Golden Feniks (Award of the Society of Catholic Editors), 2018;
- President Lech Kaczynski Award, 2019;
- Order of the White Eagle, 2019;
- Cross of Freedom and Solidarity, 2026.
