= List of ambassadors of Poland to Russia =

Poland Ambassador to Russia
- Ambasador Rzeczypospolitej Polskiej w Rosji
- Coat of arms of Poland

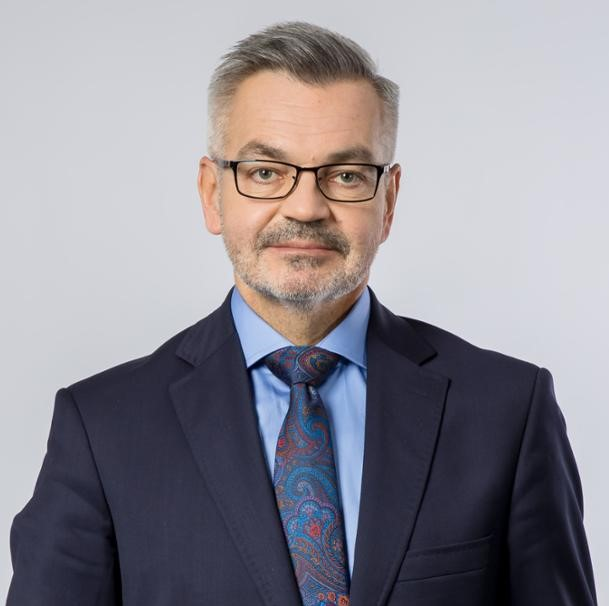
- Incumbent; Krzysztof Krajewski since 18 May 2021
- Style: Mr. Ambassador (informal); His Excellency (diplomatic)
- Reports to: Polish Ministry of Foreign Affairs
- Seat: Moscow, Russia
- Appointer: President of Poland
- Term length: No fixed term
- Website: Embassy of Poland, Russia

The Republic of Poland Ambassador to Russia is the leader of the Poland delegation to Russia.

As with all Poland Ambassadors, the ambassador to Russia is nominated by the President of Poland and confirmed by the Parliamentary Commission of the Foreign Affairs. The ambassador serves at the pleasure of the president, and enjoys full diplomatic immunity.

Poland Embassy in Russia is located in Moscow. In addition there are Consulates General located in Irkutsk, Kaliningrad and Saint Petersburg. There is also Consular Agency in Smolensk, which is responsible for looking after the Katyn massacre and Smolensk air disaster memorials.

== History ==
Poland and Russia had exchanged diplomatic missions for centuries. The first ambassador in the modern meaning of this word, from Poland to Russia, was Antoni Augustyn Deboli, in late 18th century. After the period of partitions of Poland, in 1918, relations were established between the Second Polish Republic and Soviet Union. After Soviet invasion of Poland in 1939 those relations were broken, to be briefly reestablished in 1941 after the German invasion of the Soviet Union, when the Soviet Union and Polish government in exile agreed to cooperate against their common enemy, Nazi Germany. Those relations were broken in 1943 after discovery of the Katyn massacre. From that point onward, Soviet Union created its own puppet Polish government, which had its "ambassadors" in the Soviet Union. In 1989 the People's Republic of Poland was transformed into the modern Poland; in 1991, Soviet Union was transformed into modern Russia.

== List of ambassadors of Poland to Russia ==
=== Polish–Lithuanian Commonwealth ===
- 1556 Stefan Zbaraski
- 1571 Michał Haraburda
- 1686 Krzysztof Grzymułtowski
- 1702 Krzysztof Białłozor
- 1704 Tomasz Działyński
- 1707–1709 Józef Tausz
- 1712 Marcin Wołłowicz i Michał Puzyna
- 1717–1718 Franciszek Poniński
- 1718 Lesiowski
- 1719–1720 Stanisław Chomętowski
- 1735 Ignacy Zawisza
- 1739–1743 Ignacy Ogiński
- 1762 Alojzy Fryderyk von Brühl
- 1763 Jan Jędrzej Borch
- 1764 Gerwazy Ludwik Oskierka
- 1764–1765 Franciszek Rzewuski
- 1765–1766 Jakub Psarski
- 1766–1767 Franciszek Rzewuski
- 1767–1772 Jakub Psarski (resident)
- 1771 Franciszek Ksawery Branicki
- 1767–1776 Antoni Augustyn Deboli (first ambassador in the modern meaning of this word)
- 1776 Ignacy Kluczewski (chargé d’affaires)
- 1776–1792 Antoni Augustyn Deboli

=== Second Polish Republic ===
Note: Second Republic was created in 1918. Its ambassadors were sent to the newly created successor state of Russia, the Soviet Union.

- 1917–1918 Aleksander Lednicki (of the Regency Council)
- 1918–1919 Ludwik Darowski (j.w.)
- 1919–1920 Józef Targowski (Minister Pełnomocny i Wysoki Komisarz RP na Syberię)
- 1921 Tytus Filipowicz (Chargé d'Affaires)
- 1921–1923 Roman Knoll (Poseł)
- 1923–1924 Kazimierz Wyszyński (Chargé d'Affaires a.i.)
- 1924 Ludwik Darowski
- 1924–1925 Kazimierz Wyszyński (Chargé d'Affaires a.i.)
- 1925–1926 Stanisław Kętrzyński
- 1926–1932 Stanisław Patek
- 1932–1933 Henryk Sokolnicki (Chargé d'Affaires a.i.)
- 1933–1934 Juliusz Łukasiewicz
- 1934–1936 Juliusz Łukasiewicz (Ambasador)
- 1936–1939 Wacław Grzybowski

=== Polish government-in-exile ===
Note: Legal successor of the Second Polish Republic.

- 1941 Józef Retinger (Chargé d'Affaires)
- 1941–1942 Stanisław Kot
- 1942 Henryk Sokolnicki (Chargé d'Affaires a.i.)
- 1942–1943 Tadeusz Romer

=== People's Republic of Poland ===
Note: Officially, People's Republic of Poland is the name used since 1952. Unofficially, this name is used for all Polish communist governments since 1944.

- 1944 Stefan Jędrychowski
- 1945 Zygmunt Modzelewski
- 1945–1946 Henryk Raabe
- 1947–1950 Marian Naszkowski
- 1953–1957 Wacław Lewikowski
- 1957–1959 Tadeusz Gede
- 1959–1963 Bolesław Jaszczuk
- 1963–1964 Edmund Pszczółkowski
- 1968–1971 Jan Ptasiński
- 1971 Zenon Nowak
- 1978–1982 Kazimierz Olszewski
- 1982–1985 Stanisław Kociołek
- 1985–1989 Włodzimierz Natorf

=== Third Polish Republic ===
Note: modern Poland.

- 1989–1996 Stanisław Ciosek
- 1996–2002 Andrzej Załucki
- 2002–2005 Stefan Meller
- 2005–2006 Wiktor Ross (chargé d'affaires a.i.)
- 2006–2010 Jerzy Bahr
- 2010–2014 Wojciech Zajączkowski
- 2014–2016 Katarzyna Pełczyńska-Nałęcz
- 2016–2020 Włodzimierz Marciniak
- since 2021 – Krzysztof Krajewski

== See also ==
- Ambassadors and envoys from Russia to Poland (1763–1794)
- Ambassadors and envoys from the Soviet Union to Poland
- Poland–Russia relations
