= Krzysztof Krajewski =

Polish diplomat

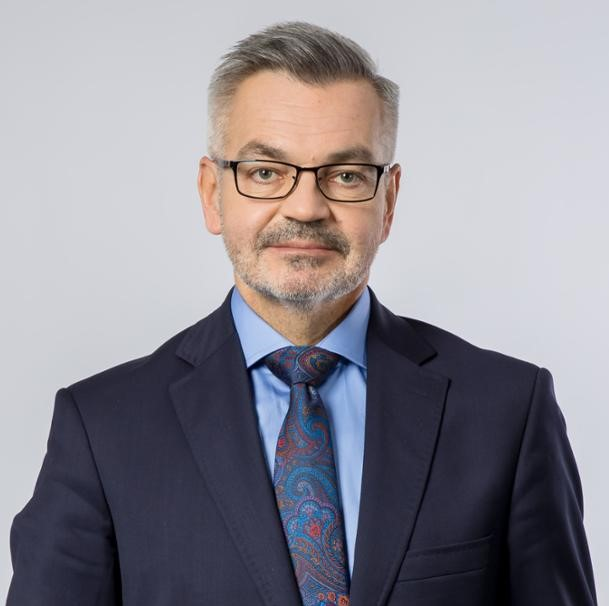
- Krajewski in 2021

Poland Ambassador to Russia
- Incumbent
- Assumed office 27 February 2021
- Appointed by: Andrzej Duda
- President: Vladimir Putin
- Preceded by: Włodzimierz Marciniak

Director of the Diplomatic Protocol
- In office 2018–2021
- Appointed by: Jacek Czaputowicz
- Preceded by: Irena Lichnerowicz-Augustyn
- Succeeded by: Marek Szczepanowski
- In office 2010–2014
- Appointed by: Radosław Sikorski
- Preceded by: Mariusz Kazana
- Succeeded by: Piotr Wojtczak

Poland Ambassador to Bulgaria
- In office 2014–2018
- Appointed by: Bronisław Komorowski
- President: Rosen Plevneliev; Rumen Radev
- Preceded by: Leszek Hensel
- Succeeded by: Maciej Szymański

Poland Ambassador to Azerbaijan
- In office 2005–2010
- Appointed by: Aleksander Kwaśniewski
- President: Ilham Aliyev
- Preceded by: Marcin Nawrot
- Succeeded by: Michał Łabenda

Poland Consul General to Varna
- In office 1998–2003
- Preceded by: Zenon Mikołajczyk
- Succeeded by: Wiesław Nowicki

Personal details
- Born: 3 August 1963 (age 63) Warsaw
- Spouse: Aldona Krajewska
- Children: 2
- Education: University of Warsaw
- Profession: Diplomat

Krzysztof Adam Krajewski (born 3 August 1963, in Warsaw) is a Polish diplomat; ambassador to Azerbaijan (2005–2010), Bulgaria (2014–2018), and Russia (since 2021).

== Life ==
Krajewski has graduated from international relations at the University of Warsaw in 1987. Just after graduation he worked for the Office of the Council of Ministers.

In 1993, he joined the Ministry of Foreign Affairs of Poland. He was heading the Information Unit at the Department of Information and Promotion. From 1994 to 1998 he held the posts of deputy director and director of the Bureau of Human Resources. Between 1998 and 2003 he was serving as Consul-General in Varna. In 2005, he was advisor to the Marshal of Sejm. Following his directoral post at the Minister of Foreign Affairs Secretariat (2003–2005), in 2005 he was nominated Poland ambassador to Azerbaijan. He ended his term in 2010. and became director of the Diplomatic Protocol. On 28 July 2014, he was nominated Poland ambassador to Bulgaria, and presented his letter of credence on 9 August 2014. Ending his term on 30 September 2018, he returned to the post of the director of Diplomatic Protocol. In October 2020, he was unanimously accepted by both ruling and opposing parties of Polish Sejm as an ambassador to Russia. He had received the nomination in November 2020. He arrived to Moscow on 27 February 2021 and began his term officially on 4 March 2021. He handed his credentials on 18 May 2021.

Besides Polish, Krajewski speaks English, Bulgarian, German and Russian. He is married to Aldona Krajewska, with two children.

== Honours ==
- Gold Cross of Merit, Poland (1997)
- Honorary citizen of Varna (2002)
- Medal of the National Education Commission, Poland (2003)
- Dostlug Order, Azerbaijan (2010)
- Knight's Cross of the Order of Polonia Restituta, Poland (2011)
- Commander's Cross of the Order of Merit, Portugal (2012)
- Commander's Cross of the Order of Orange-Nassau, the Netherlands (2012)
- Commander's Cross of the Royal Norwegian Order of Merit, Norway (2012)
- Commander's Cross of the Order of the Three Stars, Latvia (2012)
- Commander's Cross of the Order of the Phoenix, Greece (2014)
- Order of the Cross of Terra Mariana, 3rd Class, Estonia (2014)
- Order of the Balkan Mountains, 1st class, Bulgaria (2018)
- Commander's Cross of the Order for Merits to Lithuania (2019)
- Officer's Cross of the Order of Polonia Restituta, Poland (2019)
