= Barbara Tuge-Erecińska =

Polish diplomat and civil service member

Her Excellency Barbara Tuge-Erecińska
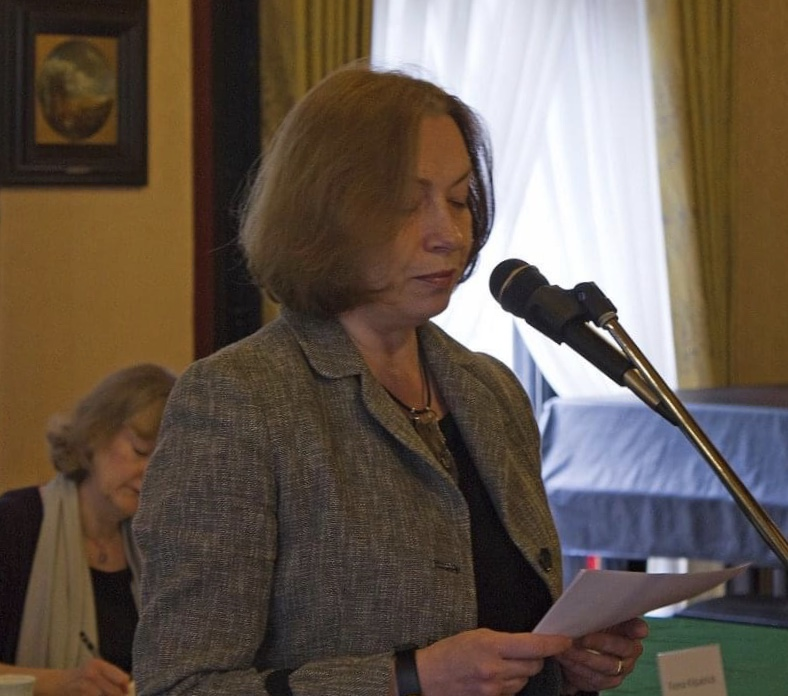

Poland Ambassador to Cyprus
- In office 2014–2018
- Appointed by: Bronisław Komorowski
- President: Nicos Anastasiades
- Preceded by: Paweł Dobrowolski
- Succeeded by: Irena Lichnerowicz-Augustyn

Poland Ambassador to the United Kingdom
- In office 2006–2012
- Appointed by: Lech Kaczyński
- Monarch: Elizabeth II
- Preceded by: Zbigniew Matuszewski
- Succeeded by: Witold Sobków

Secretary of State in the Ministry of Foreign Affairs
- In office 2005–2006

Poland Ambassador to Denmark
- In office 2001–2005
- Appointed by: Aleksander Kwaśniewski
- Monarch: Margrethe II
- Preceded by: Jan Górecki
- Succeeded by: Jakub Wolski

Undersecretary of State in the Ministry of Foreign Affairs
- In office 1999–2001

Poland Ambassador to Sweden
- In office 1991–1997
- Appointed by: Lech Wałęsa
- Monarch: Carl XVI Gustaf
- Preceded by: Sławomir Dąbrowa
- Succeeded by: Ryszard Czarny

Personal details
- Born: 24 March 1956 (age 70) Gdańsk, Poland
- Children: one son

Barbara Krystyna Tuge-Erecińska (Polish pronunciation: [tugɛ-ɛrɛ't͡ɕiɲska]; born 24 March 1956) is a Polish diplomat and civil service member who served as a Ambassador of the Republic of Poland to Sweden (1991–1997), to Denmark (2001–2005), to the United Kingdom of Great Britain and Northern Ireland (2006–2012), and to Cyprus (2014–2018). She also served as an Undersecretary of State (1999–2001) and Secretary of State (2005–2006) in the Ministry of Foreign Affairs.

== Life ==
After graduating in 1980 from the University of Gdańsk at the onset of the anti-communist Solidarity movement, Tuge-Erecińska joined the Union and set up the Solidarity International Department. "In a way, this was my first diplomatic post," she said. Her father and grandfather were members of the Home Army (Armia Krajowa) during the German and Soviet occupations of Poland in World War II. They were arrested by the Soviets and sent to Siberia. Both survived the gulags thanks to the lifesaving determination of her father.

Tuge-Erecińska worked closely with Solidarity leader Lech Wałęsa during the 1980s. When martial law was declared in Poland on 13 December 1981, she joined the protest in the shipyard. She was the one to smuggle out the official statement by the striking workers that the resistance would continue in spite of military coup d'état. She assisted families of political prisoners and set up a commission with the Polish Church to help them. Active in the underground during the martial law in Poland, she was harassed by the communist party. "It wasn't a big deal compared to what happened to some," she remembered. "The worst experience was when my son was one year old – to see those security men searching in my baby's cot." Nearly a decade later, in 1989 during the first partially free elections in the Eastern Bloc, Tuge-Erecińska was appointed Gdańsk's liaison with the foreign dignitaries and journalists visiting Wałęsa, Poland's ‘real’ president. After Wałęsa's election victory in 1990, she was appointed Ambassador to Sweden (1991–1997). "At 35, not only was I the only female at our embassy, I was also the youngest member of staff," she told British Diplomat magazine.

In 1999, Tuge-Erecińska became Poland's first woman Deputy Foreign Minister—the position held until 2001, and again in 2005. During her inaugural speech as Ambassador to the UK, Tuge-Erecińska said: I feel privileged to be posted to this special place, which supported us during the darkest days... . Her work as the highest ranking diplomat revolves around the Polish participation in the EU with its complex political life and economy. Between 2014 and 2018 she was ambassador to Cyprus. In April 2025, she took the post of Chargé d'affaires of Poland to Czechia.

She is mother to a son.

== Awards ==
- Gold Cross of Merit – 1997
- Commander of the Order of Merit of the Italian Republic – 2000
- Commander of the Order of Merit of the Republic of Hungary – 2001
- Commander of the Order of the Dannebrog – 2005
- Grand Cross of the Order pro Merito Melitensi – 2011
- Grand Cross of the Sacred Military Constantinian Order of Saint George – 2012

== See also ==
- List of Ambassadors of Poland to the United Kingdom
- Poland–United Kingdom relations
