= Stanisław Ciosek =

Polish diplomat and politician (1939–2022)

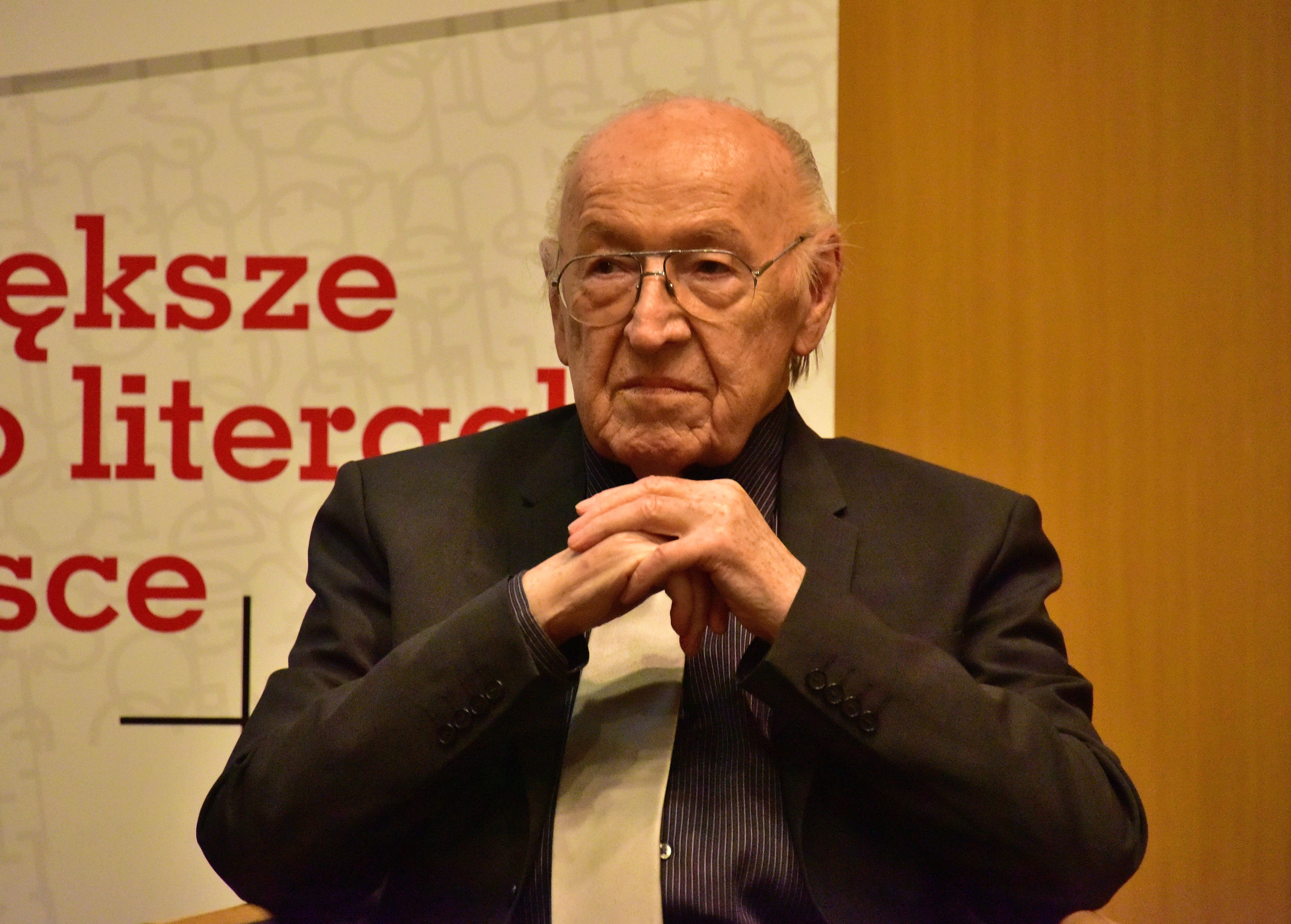
- Ciosek in 2019

Poland Ambassador to Russia
- In office 1989–1996
- Preceded by: Włodzimierz Natorf
- Succeeded by: Andrzej Załucki

Minister for Cooperation with Trade Unions
- In office 21 November 1980 – 12 November 1985

Minister of Labor and Social Policy
- In office 23 March 1983 – 30 May 1984
- Preceded by: Antoni Rajkiewicz
- Succeeded by: Stanisław Gębala

Member of the Sejm
- In office 28 March 1972 – 3 December 1984

Personal details
- Born: Stanisław Józef Ciosek; 2 May 1939 Pawłowice, Poland
- Died: 19 October 2022 (aged 83)
- Party: PZPR
- Education: University of Gdańsk
- Occupation: Diplomat

Stanisław Józef Ciosek (2 May 1939 – 19 October 2022) was a Polish diplomat and politician.

A member of the Polish United Workers' Party, he served in the Sejm from 1972 to 1985. He was Minister of Labor and Social Policy from 1983 to 1984 and Minister for Cooperation with Trade Unions from 1980 to 1985. Lastly, he served as Poland Ambassador to Russia from 1989 to 1996.

Ciosek died on 19 October 2022, at the age of 83.

== Awards and decorations ==
- Commander's Cross with Star of Order of Polonia Restituta (2005)
- Commander's Cross of Order of Polonia Restituta
- Knight's Cross of Order of Polonia Restituta
- Officer's Cross of Order of the Lithuanian Grand Duke Gediminas (Lithuania, 1999)
- Commander of Order for Merits to Lithuania (Lithuania, 2003)
- Order of the White Star, 2nd Class (Estonia, 2002)
