= Juliusz Mieroszewski Centre for Dialogue =

Juliusz Mieroszewski Centre for Dialogue, Polish Centrum Dialogu im. Juliusza Mieroszewskiego (formerly, Centre for Polish-Russian Dialogue and Understanding, Polish Centrum Polsko-Rosyjskiego Dialogu i Porozumienia) initiates and supports projects improving dialogue and understanding between Poland and the Russian Federation. The centre is a state legal person supervised by the Ministry of Culture and National Heritage since 19 April 2011 according to the March 2011 law.

Creation of parallel Polish and Russian dialogue centres was decided during President Medvedev's visit to Poland in December 2010. Russia created the Centre for Russian-Polish Dialogue and Reconciliation in Moscow, which however does not cooperate with the Polish one and its director Juri Bondarenko presents controversial opinions about Russian-Polish relations.

In 2022, the institution changed its name from the Centre for Polish-Russian Dialogue and Understanding to the Juliusz Mieroszewski Centre for Dialogue. It is named after Juliusz Mieroszewski. Since 2026, it's director is Łukasz Adamski who had presented controversial opinions about Polish-Ukrainian relations.

== Directors ==
- Sławomir Dębski (2011–2016)
- Ernest Wyciszkiewicz (2016–2026)
- Łukasz Adamski (2026–present)

== Advisory Council ==
- Andrzej Nowak – historian
- Sławomir Dębski – director of Polish Institute of International Affairs
- Andrzej Grajewski – deputy editor-in-chief of the weekly Gość Niedzielny
- Jacek Miler – director of the Department of Cultural Heritage of the Polish Ministry of Culture and National Heritage
- Maria Przełomiec – journalist of Telewizja Polska

== Projects ==
- School Afloat – sailing camp for Polish and Russian youth, led by Krzysztof Baranowski
- Football Championship for boys and girls living around Polish-Russian border
- Club of Gdańsk – meeting point for Polish and Russian young leaders
- The Intersection Project: Russia/Europe/World is an online platform
- Summer School (Poland, Russia, Germany, Ukraine)

== Cultural exchange ==
Teatr.doc has been invited to Warsaw.

== Books ==
The centre has published two books about Polish-Russian history.
