= Vladimir Alganov =

Russian spy

Vladimir Petrovich Alganov (Russian: Владимир Петрович Алганов; born 22 October 1952 in Leningrad) is a Russian spy. He was Soviet KGB officer in Warsaw, Poland in the 1980s and Russian SVR officer in the same city in the 1990s.

In 1996, Poland's Prime Minister Józef Oleksy resigned because of his links to Alganov.

Alganov was deported from Poland in 1997.

In 2005 Lithuanian authorities said that Alganov had been issued a long-term Lithuanian visa in 2002 and Alganov had met managers of the Ignalina Nuclear Power Plant.

In 2003, Alganov secretly met Jan Kulczyk in a restaurant in Vienna, Austria. The conversation was recorded by Polish intelligence officers. According to Antoni Macierewicz, a member of the investigative board:

- Alganov offered Kulczyk $5 million to influence Poland's then-President Aleksander Kwaśniewski.
- Alganov said that six months earlier, Russians had paid $1m to the Minister of Finance Wiesław Kaczmarek for the Russian company Lukoil to win the privatization tender for a refinery in Gdansk.

Also present at the meeting was Aleksander Żagiel, Alganov's Vienna-based business partner.
