= Antoni Augustyn Deboli =

Polish noble and diplomat (1747–1810)

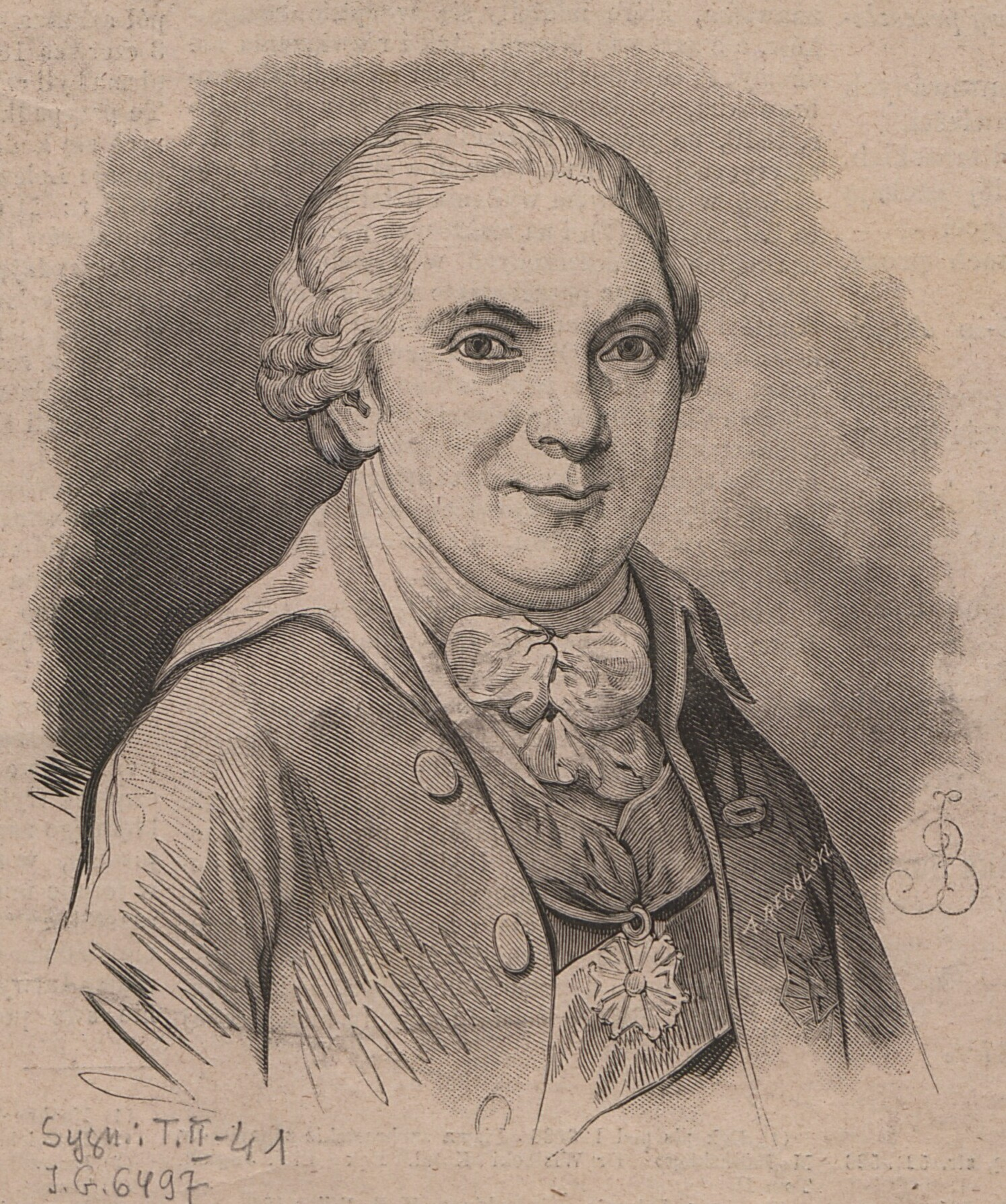
Augustyn Deboli.

Antoni Augustyn Deboli (1747–1810) was a Polish noble, diplomat, and politician.

He was the representative of the Polish king Stanisław August Poniatowski to the Russian court, from 1788 to 1795, though he had been active as a diplomat there since 1767. Prior to this, he had been a student at the Corps of Cadets.

In 1780 he became a chevalier of the Order of Saint Stanislaus.

During the Kościuszko Uprising, he was a member of the Supreme National Council.
