= Piotr Wojtczak =

Polish politician

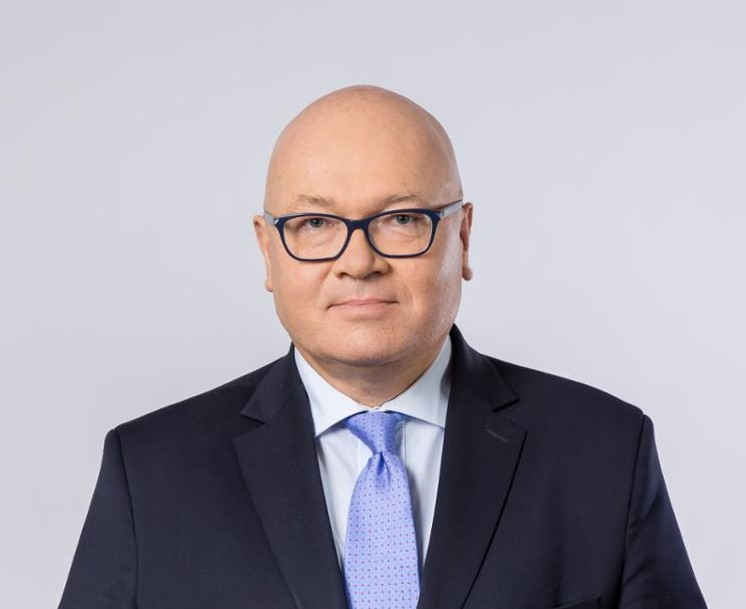

3rd Poland Ambassador to Luxembourg
- In office January 2017 – August 2024
- Preceded by: Bartosz Jałowiecki

Personal details
- Born: 1963 (age 62–63) Lublin, Poland
- Education: Maria Curie-Skłodowska University
- Profession: Diplomat

Piotr Wojtczak (born 1963, in Lublin) is a Polish diplomat, from 2017 to 2024 he was serving as an ambassador to Luxembourg.

== Life ==
Piotr Wojtczak has graduated from Romance studies and political science at the Maria Curie-Skłodowska University in Lublin. In 1994, he finished also National School of Public Administration. Besides Polish, he speaks English, French and Italian languages.

In 1994 he joined the Ministry of Foreign Affairs (MFA), becoming a specialist on European integration. He was working at the Permanent Representation to the European Union in Brussels, as a member of a team in charge of accession negotiations. Following work on a post of a deputy ambassador to Belgium (2004–2006), in January 2006 he became deputy director of the Department of Europe. Between 2006 and 2007 he was back at the Permanent Representation to the EU, this time as chargé d’affaires. For the next year he was the MFA director general. From 2008 to 2013 he was deputy ambassador and consul-general in Brussels. Following his nomination on ambassador to Luxembourg in January 2017, on 8 February 2017, he presented his diplomatic credentials to Henri, Grand Duke of Luxembourg. He ended his mission in August 2024.

== Honours ==
- Grand Officer Cross of the Order pro Merito Melitensi
