= Bekić =

Bekić is a Serbo-Croatian surname. Notable people with the surname include:

- Almir Bekić (born 1989), Bosnian footballer
- Andrea Bekić (born 1965), Croatian diplomat
- Darko Bekić (born 1946), Croatian historian and diplomat
- Dejan Bekić (1944–1967), former Serbian footballer
- Hans Bekić (1936–1982), author of Bekić's theorem
