= Bulgarian Center for Not-For-Profit Law =

Agency overview
- Formed: 2001
- Headquarters: Sofia
- Agency executives: Luben Panov, Director; Alexander Yolovski, Organizational development Legal Consultant
- Website: www.bcnl.org

The Bulgarian Center for Not-For-Profit Law (BCNL), founded in 2001, is a legal entity based in Sofia, Bulgaria with public benefit purposes to provide legal support for the development of civil society in Bulgaria. BCNL is under the guidance of the International Center for Not-for-Profit Law (ICNL) under an Affiliation Agreement. It is registered in the Central Registry at the Ministry of Justice of Bulgaria. It is also a partner of the European Center for Not-for-Profit Law (ECNL) with its headquarters in Budapest.

The BCNL aims at developing a legal framework for non-profit organizations which they believe is vitally important towards the creation of an independent and more prosperous civil society. It operates across Bulgaria, providing expertise and legal assistance to NGOs. The BCNL revolves around three interlinked priority areas of work. These include creating an enabling environment and improvement of the legal and financial framework for increased financial sustainability of NGOs in Bulgaria, assistance to NGOs to provide the knowledge for legal provisions and regulations and the promotion of an inter-government/NGO partnership. The Bulgaria Center also deals a diversity of legal and tax issues, including the private-sector provision of social and healthcare services.

== 2002 ==
The BCNL is supported by USAID and the International Center for Not-for-Profit Law in both Bulgarian and international legal expertise. The program has been of notable importance in drawing together multi-party support of a modern legal framework. A new law was drafted in Bulgaria which permitted not-for-profit organizations to engage in economic and legal activity, curbing the state control over the activities of not-for-profit organizations. In 2002 the BCNL participated with the Ministry of Finance for drafting amendments to pre existing tax laws related to NGOs. The BCNL initiated a major e-mail campaign for support of the draft amendments on the NGO taxation. This initiative and lobbying elsewhere resulted in the adoption of new tax concessions for NGOs in Bulgaria in December 2002.

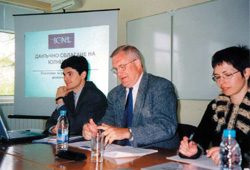
Leaders of International Center for Not-for-Profit Law conducting training for the Bulgarian Chief Tax Directorate.

During 2002, BCNL operatatives consulted over 140 organizations to undertake the implementation of the basic NGO Law, labor legislation and taxation and signed a partnership agreement with the American Red Cross which provided the obligation to provide legal assistance to the Bulgarian Red Cross. The BCNL worked with the Bulgaria Pilot Community Fund and Social Enterprise Program also, supporting the foundation of three Community Funds in Chepelare, Gabrovo and Blagoevgrad.

== 2003 ==
In 2003, the BCNL and the Open Society Foundation of Sofia continued their campaign for draft amendments of the Not-for-Profit Legal Entities Act. These proposals included the abolition of the dividend tax for public benefit NGOs, the right to withhold 50% of the corporate tax on related economic activity by public benefit NGOs, and the inclusion of public benefit NGOs among the recipients of donations exempted from value added tax. However, although the proposals were supported by the Parliamentary Civil Society Committee, the Ministry of Finance did not approve of the proposals and did not include them in drafting amendments to the tax laws. In 2003 together with the Open Society Foundation and the Program and Analytical Center for European Law, the BCNL started a joint initiative for creating a central guideline for financial sustainability of the NGO sector in Bulgaria. Their objective was to systematize different tools that would aid the financial independence of NGOs in the country and to provide knowledge on legislation to increase their power. The BCNL also initiated the preparation of a NGO Law Textbook, which presented an in-depth analysis on the NGO legal framework in Bulgaria. In 2003, the BCNL completed a project on the “Legal Arrangements on Hospices in the Republic of Bulgaria” and published three books related to the subject. In December, 2003 they initiated a project called ”Social Services in Bulgaria – new opportunities for development“ which was funded by the PHARE Civil Society Development Program of the European Union. It was conducted for 8 months ending in July 2004 which the objective to develop the system of social services in Bulgaria and facilitating a partnership between NGOs and municipalities in the social sector.

== 2004 ==
At the end of 2004, the BCNL helped the municipalities of Pazardzhik, Drianovo and Byala Slatina to organize 7 of the first competitions in Bulgaria for contracting out of social services. The initiation was followed by several other municipalities and social services reform at a local level and established public councils. In 2004 the BCNL signed a partnership with the Ministry of Labor and Social Policy (MLSP) to facilitate this social reform and provided a cooperation with various other state institutions in this area, aiming at achieving the decentralization of social services in Bulgaria and providing new and modern alternatives to social policy in the country.

== 2005 ==
In February 2005, the Bulgarian Center for Not-For-Profit Law conducted a nationwide Survey on the legal problems of non-profit organizations in Bulgaria. They drew up a concept paper for changes to NGO legislation based on the analysis of the results of this survey. The BCNL organized a campaign for discussing this new Concept Paper which was sent to over 3000 organizations and well publicized in public events and seminars. In the end over 400 Bulgarian organizations supported the documentation and provided the background to new NPO legislation in 2006. In 2005 the BCNL aimed to strengthen informal NPO alliances under the project Strategy for Strengthening the Sustainability of the Non-Profit Sector in Bulgaria, playing a key role in the organisation of meetings and in legislative priorities of the political parties who cooperated. In the social sphere, they formed a partnership with the Bulgarian Association for Persons with Intellectual Disabilities (BAPID) to provide mutual support on social projects, training and initiatives, with the BCNL providing legal aid to the BAPID and to further their objectives of social services decentralization. This involved the entity in international conferences held in Lisbon and Brussels. In November 2005 they established the Association of Social Enterprises in Bulgaria in Varna in which 26 organizations formed a social enterprise alliance.

The BCNL also attempted to address problems with VAT law registration in European program financing Including the PHARE Civil Society Development Program, a meeting was held with the Delegation of the European Commission in Bulgaria with the new Deputy Minister of Finance Georgi Kadiev to discuss reforms but it was eventually upheld. In 2005 they also worked in partnership with the Bulgarian Charities Aid Foundation and the Bulgarian Donors’ Forum and in the October participated in an experts’ group that made further proposals to the Maecenas Law prior to its second parliamentary reading. The BCNL published the book on Social Entrepreneurship and Control on the Social Services in Bulgaria and in the European Union analysing the legal framework of social enterprise in Bulgarian legislation, and controls on social services in Bulgarian and the European Union and to examine the current trend in social reform. They also published the books What is a Social Enterprise?, a question and answer publication published with financial aid from the European Union and Philanthropy for Cultural Organizations in Bulgaria with the intent to analyse the existing legal regime of cultural organizations and stipulated legal possibilities for philanthropy and sponsorship of cultural and tax initiatives.

== 2007 ==
In 2007, the Bulgarian Center for Not-For-Profit Law opposed a new bill for the modification and amendment of the Law on Taxes introduced in Parliament, which attempted to cancel of all types of tax deduction for donors. The BCNL saw the bill as a way in which the Bulgarian government were attempting to counteract the large number of non-profit organizations now running in the country.

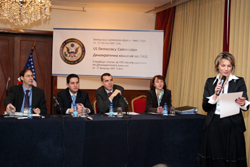
A 2007 conference organized by the Bulgarian Center for Not-For-Profit Law between USAID and key members of the Bulgarian government in legal and social policy

However the BCNL has worked with the government and received support on many of its initiatives. On May 16, 2007, the BCNL organized a charity event in the Central Military Club in Sofia to raise funds for the establishment of a crisis centre for homeless people in Veliko Tarnovo. The event which was coordinated under the banner “Let’s help homeless people change their destiny” received support from the Bulgarian Ministry of Labour and Social Policy and the Municipality of Veliko Tarnovo.

In October 2007 the BCNL attended a conference held by the European Citizen Action Service (ECAS) in Brussels within “The Next Mile of the European Civil Society Infrastructure” Programme. The mission was to provide help to NGOs in the EU with advice on how to lobby, fund raise and protect the rights of European citizens.

== Staff ==
Luben Panov is the director of the entity. Notable legal consultants working for the BCNL include Marieta Dimitrova, Nadya Shabani, Mila Boyanova, Ralitsa Velichkova, Atanas Slavov and Pavleta Alexieva.
