= Jarosław Lindenberg =

Polish diplomat (born 1956)

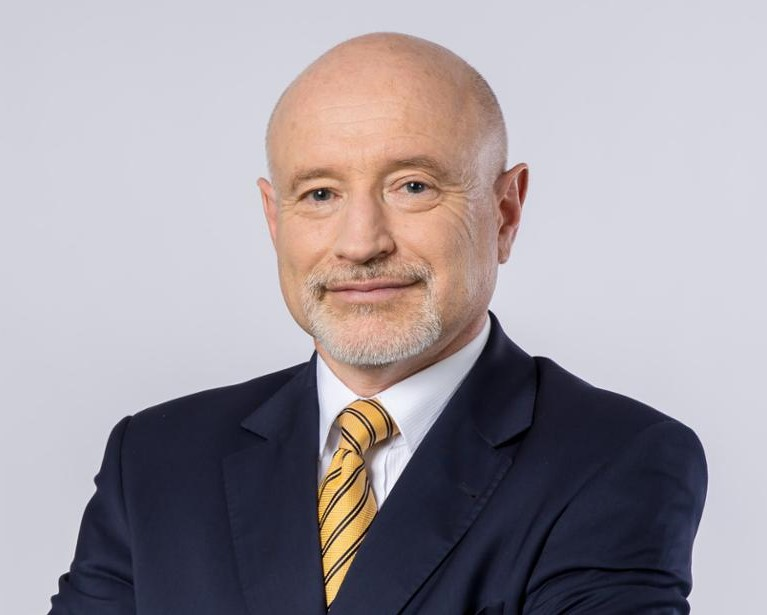

Poland Ambassador to Bosnia and Herzegovina
- In office August 2018 – September 2023
- Appointed by: Andrzej Duda
- Chairman of the Presidency: Bakir Izetbegović; Milorad Dodik; Željko Komšić; Šefik Džaferović; Milorad Dodik; Željko Komšić; Šefik Džaferović
- Preceded by: Andrzej Krawczyk
- Succeeded by: Andrzej Jasionowski

Poland Charge d'Affairs to Montenegro
- In office 2007–2011
- Appointed by: Lech Kaczyński
- President: Filip Vujanović
- Preceded by: Office established
- Succeeded by: Grażyna Sikorska

Poland Ambassador to Bulgaria
- In office 1998–2003
- Appointed by: Aleksander Kwaśniewski
- President: Petar Stoyanov; Georgi Parvanov
- Preceded by: Romuald Kunat
- Succeeded by: Sławomir Dąbrowa

Poland Ambassador to Latvia
- In office 1991–1997
- Appointed by: Lech Wałęsa
- President: Anatolijs Gorbunovs; Guntis Ulmanis
- Preceded by: Office restored
- Succeeded by: Jarosław Bratkiewicz

Personal details
- Born: 9 November 1956 (age 69) Warsaw, Poland
- Children: 3
- Education: University of Warsaw
- Profession: Diplomat, philosopher

Jarosław Lindenberg (born 9 November 1956 in Warsaw) is a Polish diplomat and philosopher. Between 11 September 2023 and 13 December 2023, he served as the Under Undersecretary of State at the Ministry of Foreign Affairs. He was previously the Polish ambassador to Latvia (1992–1997), Bulgaria (1998–2003), and Bosnia and Herzegovina (2018-2023), as well as chargé d'affaires to Montenegro (2007–2011).

== Life ==
Lindenberg graduated from Faculty of Philosophy of the University of Warsaw. In 1985, he defended his PhD thesis on philosophy of history by Bolesław Limanowski.

Since the late 1970s, he was engaged in Polish dissident movement, for instance, he was editor of the samizdat magazine "Jaruzela"; he was cooperating with Jacek Czaputowicz at that time. He was member of the Club of Catholic Intelligentsia. He was an internee during the martial law in 1981–1982.

Between 1980 and 1986, he worked at Branch of the University of Warsaw in Białystok. For the next five years he was a lecturer at the Academy of Special Education in Warsaw. In the 1980s, he was also, occasionally, writing scenarios and co-authoring novels.

In 1990, he joined the Polish Ministry of Foreign Affairs, starting at the minister cabinet. In 1991, he was responsible for opening Polish embassies in Riga, Latvia and Tallinn, Estonia, heading them as chargé d'affaires. From 1992 to 1997, he was ambassador to Latvia, until 1994 accredited to Estonia as well. From 1997 he was working at the MFA Department of Promotion and Information. In 1998, Lindenberg became ambassador to Bulgaria, ending his term in 2003. For the next four years he worked at the MFA European Department and Director General's Office. Between 2007 and 2011, he was chargé d'affaires and ambassador to newly opened embassy in Podgorica, Montenegro. From 2011 to 2018, he was deputy director of the Diplomatic Protocol. In August 2018, he was nominated ambassador to Bosnia and Herzegovina, presenting his letter of credence on 20 August 2018. He ended his term on 9 September 2023. On 11 September 2023, he took the post of Under Undersecretary of State at the Ministry of Foreign Affairs, being responsible for consular affairs, cultural and public diplomacy, as well as cooperation with Polish diaspora and Poles abroad. He ended his term on 13 December 2023.

== Honours ==
- Commander of the Order of the Three Stars, Latvia (1996)
- Meritorious Activist of Culture, Poland (2001)
- Order of the Balkan Mountains, Bulgaria (2004)
- Cross of Freedom and Solidarity, Poland (2012)
- Medal of the Centenary of Regained Independence, Poland (2023)

== Private life ==
Lindenberg is married to Aleksandra Emilia Lindenberg, with three children. He is brother to Grzegorz Lindenberg. In his youth, he was close friend to Jacek Kaczmarski.

Besides Polish, he speaks English, French, Russian, Bulgarian and Serbo-Croatian.

== Works ==
- Lindenberg, Jarosław; Szołajski, Konrad (1992). Człowiek z krwi i kości (in Polish). Warszawa: Migo. ISBN 83-85596-00-3. OCLC 750939683.
- Lindenberg, Jarosław; Buchholtz, Tomasz (2018). Jak wyginęły dinozaury czyli Tajemnica Bursztynowej Komnaty : powieść sensacyjna dla inteligentnych inaczej : lektura szkolna zalecana przez Ministerstwo Zdrowia (Psychicznego) (in Polish). Wrocław: Liberum Verbum. ISBN 978-83-952119-0-4.

== See also ==
- List of ambassadors of Poland
- Bulgaria–Poland relations
- Latvia–Poland relations
