= Poles in Bulgaria =

Polish diaspora in Bulgaria

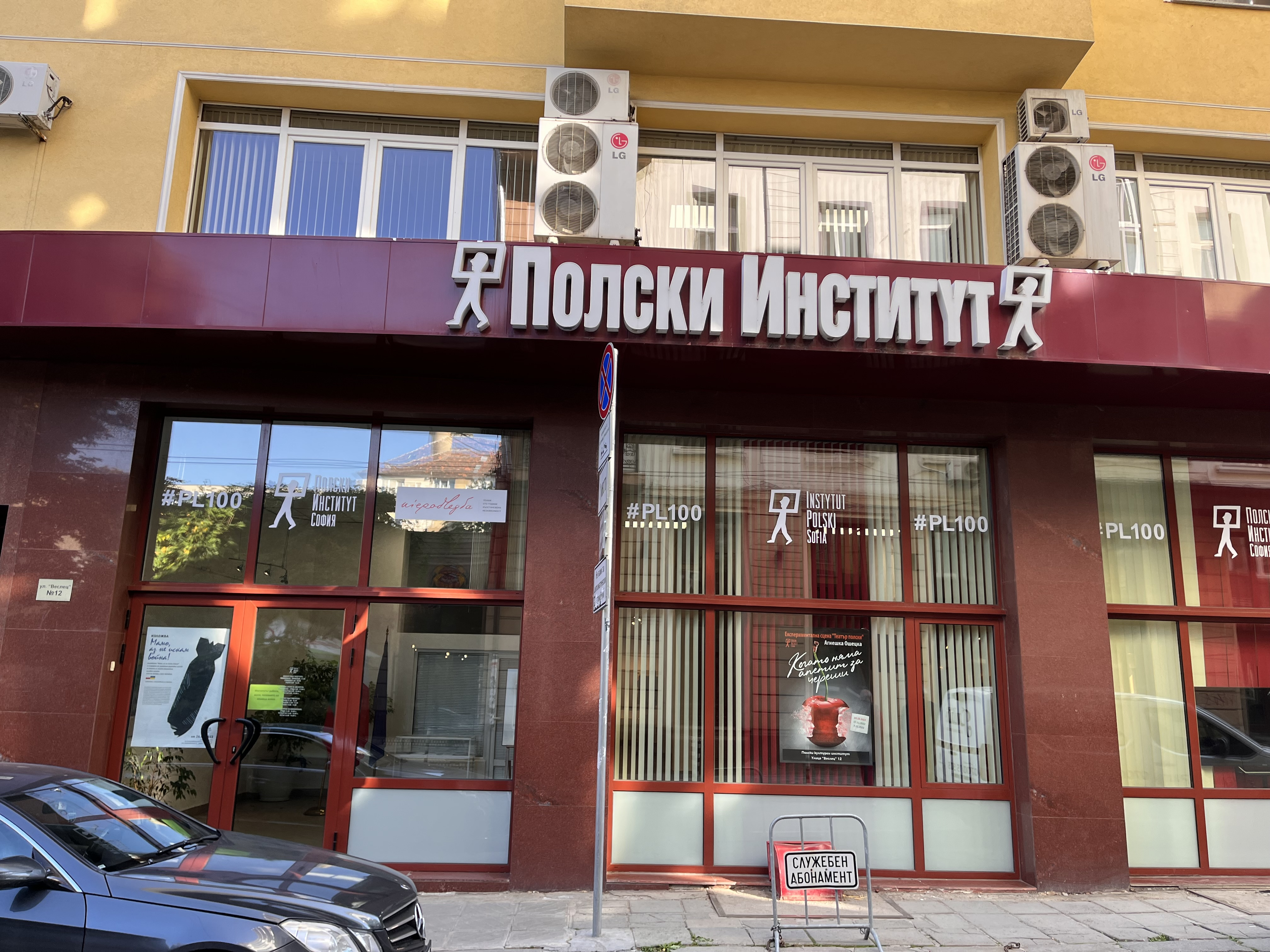
- Polish Institute in Sofia

Total population
- 5,500 (2023)

Regions with significant populations
- Sofia City Province, Burgas Province, Varna Province

Languages
- Polish, Bulgarian

Related ethnic groups
- Polish diaspora

Poles in Bulgaria form a population of several thousand, part of the Polish diaspora in the Balkans, and Polish presence in Bulgaria dates back to the 19th century.

According to 2023 estimates of the Polish Embassy in Sofia, some 5,500 Poles and people of Polish descent live in Bulgaria.

== History ==
First Polish migrants to Bulgarian territory were insurgents fleeing repressions in partitioned Poland after the unsuccessful November Uprising of 1830–1831.

After Bulgaria regained independence in 1878, Poles have made contributions to the development of the reborn country, including in the field of medicine. Polish gynecologist Mikołaj Unterberg was the pioneer of Bulgarian gynecology and obstetrics, first director of the Sofia midwifery school and co-founder of the Bulgarian Red Cross (1885), remaining active in the life of the Polish diaspora in Bulgaria. Ignacy Muszler was a pioneer of preventive dental care in Bulgaria, and worked for the Bulgarian Red Cross. Zygfryd Zdzisław Hof was the first certified dentist in Bulgaria, and he treated poor people free of charge. Ignacy Barbar is considered the founder of Bulgarian military medicine and war hygiene, and was also a member of the Polish-Bulgarian Society. Emanuel Messer was on the first surgeons in Bulgaria.

Some 100 Poles lived in the country in the 1920s.

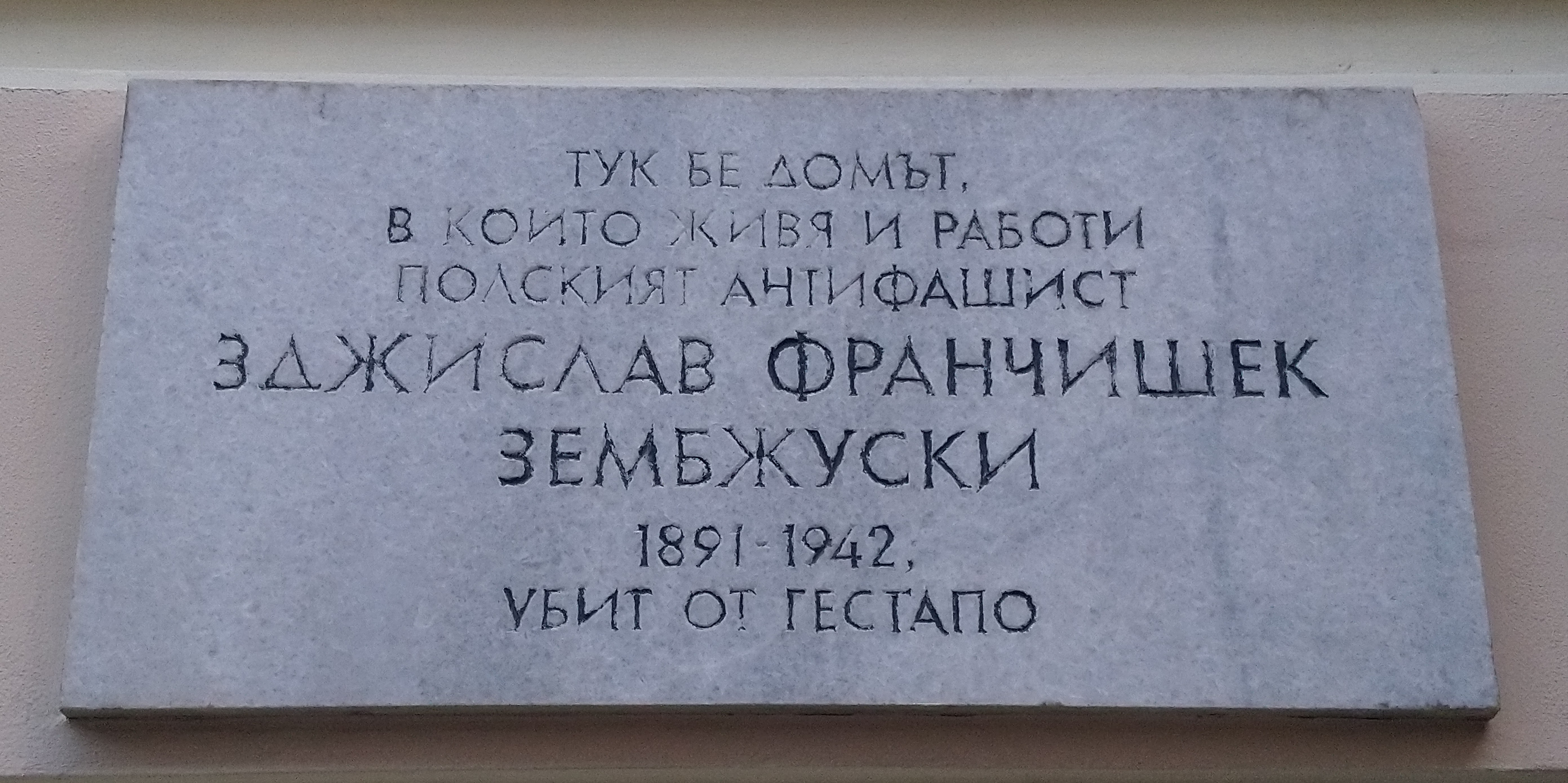
Memorial plaque to writer Zdzisław Zembrzuski in Sofia

One of the escape routes of Poles who fled to Hungary after the German-Soviet invasion of Poland, which started World War II, to Polish-allied France, where the Polish Army was reconstituted to continue the fight against Germany, led through Bulgaria. Bulgaria confidentially authorized the evacuation of Poles through its territory, after difficulties began to arise in escaping through Yugoslavia and Greece, due to those countries' fear of Germany.

In the post-war period, some Polish women moved to the country after marrying Bulgarians. A new wave of Polish immigration to Bulgaria occurred after Bulgaria's accession to the European Union, with Polish enterprises expanding their businesses in Bulgaria.

== Culture ==
Władysław of Varna Polish Cultural and Educational Association in Bulgaria was established in 1984. Polish-language Catholic church services are held in Sofia.

== See also ==
- Bulgaria–Poland relations
- Polish diaspora
- Immigration to Bulgaria
- Bulgarians in Poland
