= Bulgaria–Poland relations =

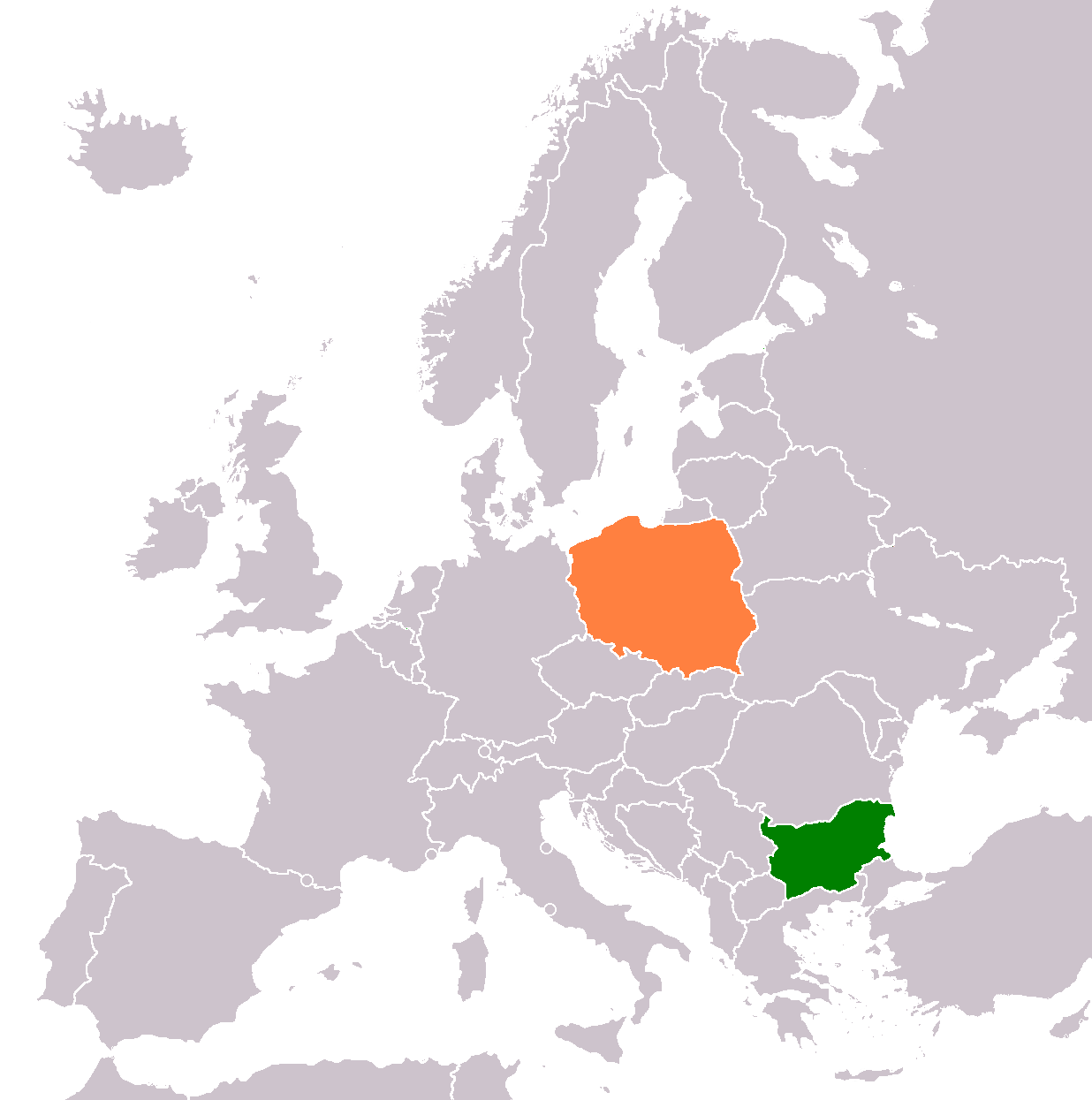

- Bulgaria: Poland

Bulgaria–Poland relations are foreign relations between Bulgaria and Poland. Bulgaria has an embassy in Warsaw. Poland has an embassy in Sofia. Both countries are full members of the European Union, NATO, Bucharest Nine, Three Seas Initiative, OSCE, Council of Europe and World Trade Organization.

Poland has given full support to Bulgaria's membership in the European Union and NATO.

== History ==
=== Medieval period ===
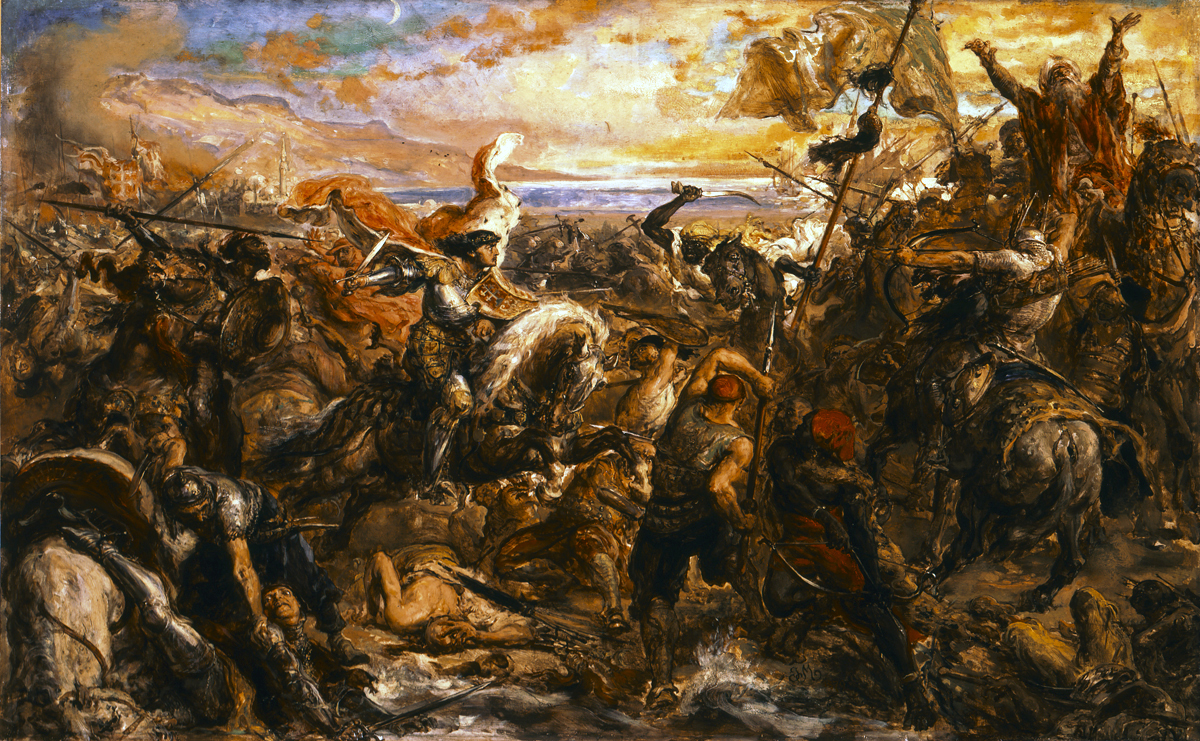
Battle of Varna, 19th-century painting by Jan Matejko

Codex Suprasliensis, the oldest Slavic literary work located in Poland, was written in Bulgaria in the 10th century. It was discovered in 1823 in Supraśl in Poland, and is now listed on the UNESCO Memory of the World Register.

Relations between Bulgaria and Poland date back to the Middle Ages. Bulgarians and Poles fought together as part of a larger European coalition at the Battle of Nicopolis in 1396 in an attempt to stop the Ottoman invasion and conquest of Bulgaria. In 1444, a coalition of Central and Eastern European countries led by Poland and King Władysław III of Poland fought in the Battle of Varna against the Ottoman Empire, in an attempt to repel the Ottoman invasion of Europe and liberate the already conquered nations of Southeast Europe, including Bulgaria. Bulgarian insurgents of Fruzhin fought alongside Poles in hope of restoring independence, however, the battle ended in the defeat of the coalition army and the death of the Polish king.

=== Modern period ===
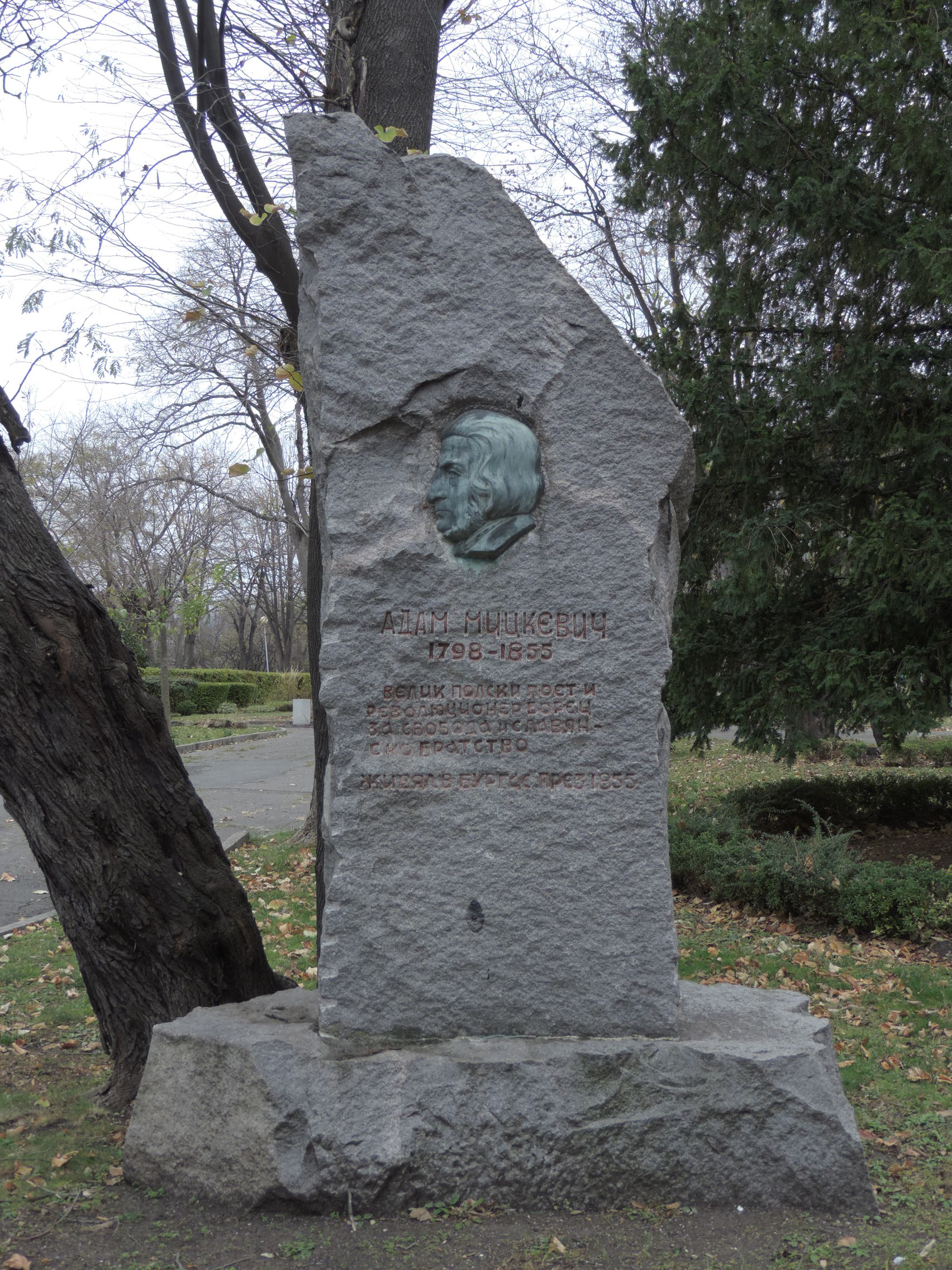
Adam Mickiewicz Monument in Burgas

In the 19th century both nations shared a similar fate, as both were under the rule of foreign powers. Bulgaria was ruled by the Ottoman Empire, and Poland was partitioned between Austria, Prussia (afterwards Germany) and Russia. Polish physician in Ottoman service Paweł Stankiewicz saved from hanging a group of Bulgarian insurgents imprisoned by the Turks in 1864.

After Bulgaria regained independence in 1878, Poles have made contributions to the development of medicine in Bulgaria. Polish gynecologist Mikołaj Unterberg was the pioneer of Bulgarian gynecology and obstetrics, first director of the Sofia midwifery school and co-founder of the Bulgarian Red Cross (1885), remaining active in the life of the Polish diaspora in Bulgaria. Ignacy Muszler was a pioneer of preventive dental care in Bulgaria, and worked for the Bulgarian Red Cross. Zygfryd Zdzisław Hof was the first certified dentist in Bulgaria, and he treated poor people free of charge. Ignacy Barbar is considered the founder of Bulgarian military medicine and war hygiene, and was also a member of the Polish-Bulgarian Society. Emanuel Messer was on the first surgeons in Bulgaria.

In 1918, Poland also regained sovereignty, and then both countries established diplomatic relations. In independent Bulgaria, a memorial complex dedicated to King Władysław III of Poland was erected in Varna, with a symbolic mausoleum of the fallen king. A conciliation and arbitration treaty was signed in 1929 in Warsaw.

One of the escape routes of Poles who fled to Hungary after the German-Soviet invasion of Poland, which started World War II, to Polish-allied France, where the Polish Army was reconstituted to continue the fight against Germany, led through Bulgaria. Bulgaria confidentially authorized the evacuation of Poles through its territory, after difficulties began to arise in escaping through Yugoslavia and Greece, due to those countries' fear of Germany. During the war, Bulgarian prisoners were held by the Germans alike Poles in the camps in Świecko and Słońsk.

Following World War II, several treaties were signed, including a cultural cooperation treaty in 1947, a friendship, cooperation and mutual assistance treaty and an economic cooperation treaty in 1948. In 1949, the Polish Institute in Sofia was established.

A new friendship and cooperation treaty and a new cultural and scientific cooperation treaty were signed in Warsaw in 1993. In 1994, a double tax avoidance agreement was signed.

== Recent political relations ==
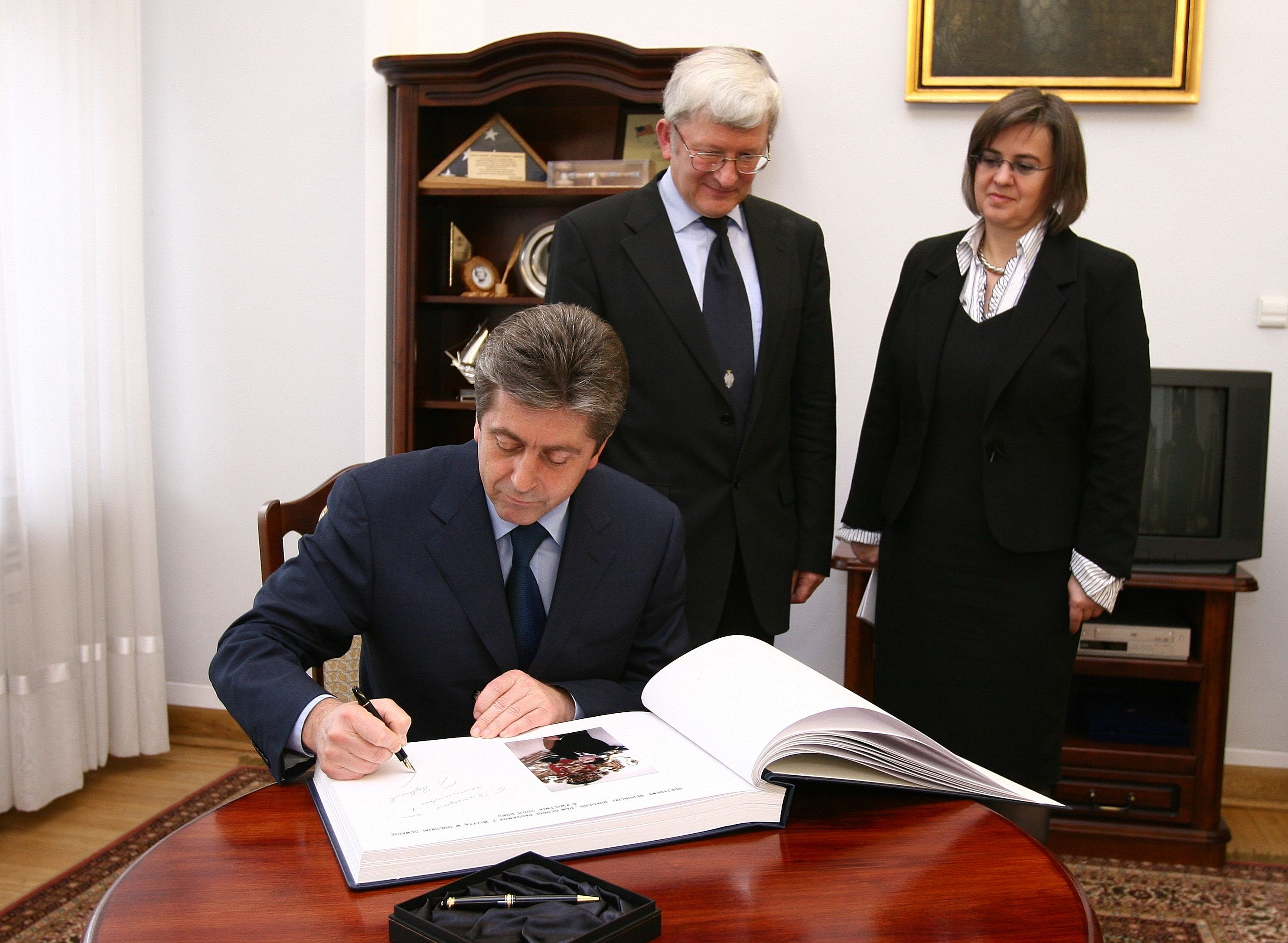
Visit of Bulgarian President Georgi Parvanov to the Senate of Poland in 2008

April 18, 2010, day of the state funeral of Lech and Maria Kaczyński, was declared a day of national mourning in Bulgaria to commemorate the 96 victims of the Smolensk air disaster, including Polish President Lech Kaczyński and his wife Maria Kaczyńska.

For the first time in 13 years, on 18 April 2016, the Polish president, Andrzej Duda, was on a state visit to Sofia to meet his counterpart Rossen Plevneliev and Bulgaria's prime minister Boyko Borisov. The heads of states discussed the options to expand business relations and deepen bilateral cooperation in the security sphere. In a joint press conference Presidents Plevneliev and Duda called for Russia to give up its "aggressive actions" and "come back" to international order and stood by the sovereignty and territorial integrity of Ukraine.

Prime minister Borisov noted that Poland is a "very important country" for Bulgaria and Sofia values the development of bilateral relations in the context of the EU and NATO. Other topics of discussion were cooperation in defense and security, trade and economic relations and opportunities to realize their full potential. Mr. Borisov added that Bulgaria "relies" on Poland to support "common interests" in the field of energy security and in establishing the EU's Energy Union.

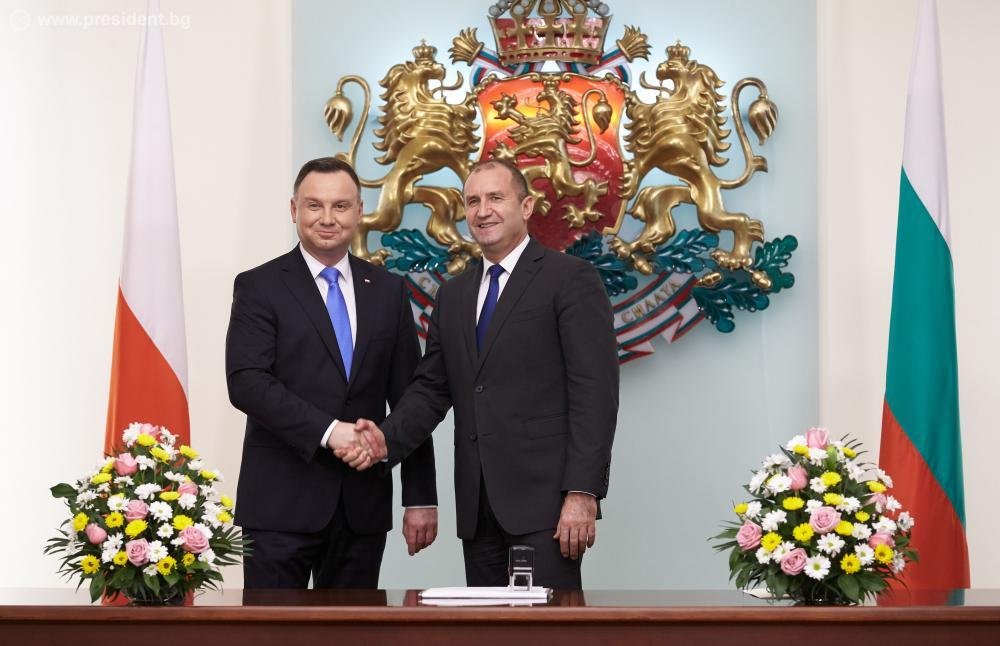
Meeting of President of Bulgaria Rumen Radev and President of Poland Andrzej Duda in Sofia in 2018

President Duda said that his visit in Sofia is a "realization of the ABC format" – Adriatic, Baltic, Black Sea (in Polish – Adriatyk, Bałtyk, Czarne [Morze]) – a project to expand the transport and energy infrastructure in this large region. Mr. Duda also said "there is no doubt" that NATO must strengthen its eastern flank from the Baltic to the Black Sea. In a joint statement, Mr. Duda and Mr. Plevneliev said that the forthcoming NATO summit in Warsaw in July is "crucial for the security of the countries of Eastern Europe". Mr. Plevneliev stressed the need for increased NATO presence in Central and Eastern Europe, as well as conducting more joint exercises and drills.

== Economic relations ==
Trade exchanges between the two countries have doubled over the past five years, from EUR 670 million in 2010 to EUR 1.3 billion in 2015. Bulgaria is also traditional destination for Polish tourists as last year 260,000 Polish tourists visited Bulgarian resorts, the statement said. Statistical data from Bulgaria's National Statistical Institute confirms the figures and also shows that the trade exchange is more or less balanced, with imports from Poland slightly exceeding exports for the same period. For example, the trade data for 2015 shows that imports and exports from and to Poland are at about the same level as those with the Netherlands, a traditional investor and trade partner for Bulgaria. Tourist visits from Poland have increased with 7% in 2014 and 3.2% in 2015. In 2015, Poland occupied the 8th spot in the top 10 ranking for most important tourist markets for Bulgaria. In January 2016, the Bulgarian Ministry of Tourism said it expects a 40% increase in the number of Poles visiting Bulgaria in 2016. Major Bulgarian cities like the capital Sofia and Varna on the Black Sea coast have purchased Polish-made trams and buses for their public transport systems. According to media reports, the total figure of the purchase is valued at about EUR 90 million.

== Military cooperation ==
In October 2015, Bulgaria signed a contract with two Polish companies to carry out repair works on six engines for the country's Mig-29 fighter jets. Maintenance and supply for the Soviet-made military hardware was usually done by Russia's RSK MiG, but in September 2015 the contract ran its course. The price of the Polish contracts was EUR 6.1 million and reports said it was lower than what the Russian company had offered, although a figure was never made public. Bulgaria's defense minister Nikolay Nenchev said the new contract would be about EUR 12 million cheaper. In December 2015, Poland delivered two spare Mig-29 engines to Bulgaria to be used while repairs on the other six engines will be ongoing. At the end of March, the Bulgarian government approved a EUR 1.2 billion program aiming to modernize its ageing armed forces. During Mr Nenchev's working visit to Warsaw in February 2015, the then-minister of defense of Poland, Tomasz Siemoniak, said Bulgaria was interested in Poland's experience with military reforms, drill programs, and equipment and military hardware.

== Upcoming projects ==
In March 2016, at an international conference in Warsaw government representatives from Lithuania, Poland, Romania, Slovakia, Turkey, Hungary and Ukraine signed a declaration on promoting the construction of the new transport route named Via Carpathia. Bulgaria was not a signatory to the document, but a Polish government spokesman was reported by Polish media as saying that Bulgaria supported the project and would "join it in the future". The statements by Presidents Duda and Plevneliev made in Sofia touch upon the development of trans-border links and infrastructure.

== NATO and European Union ==
Poland joined NATO and the EU in 1999, and 2004, respectively. Poland supported Bulgaria's aspiration to join NATO, and ratified Bulgaria's accession in 2003. Bulgaria joined NATO in 2004 and the EU in 2007.

== Resident diplomatic missions ==
- Bulgaria has an embassy in Warsaw.
- Poland has an embassy in Sofia.
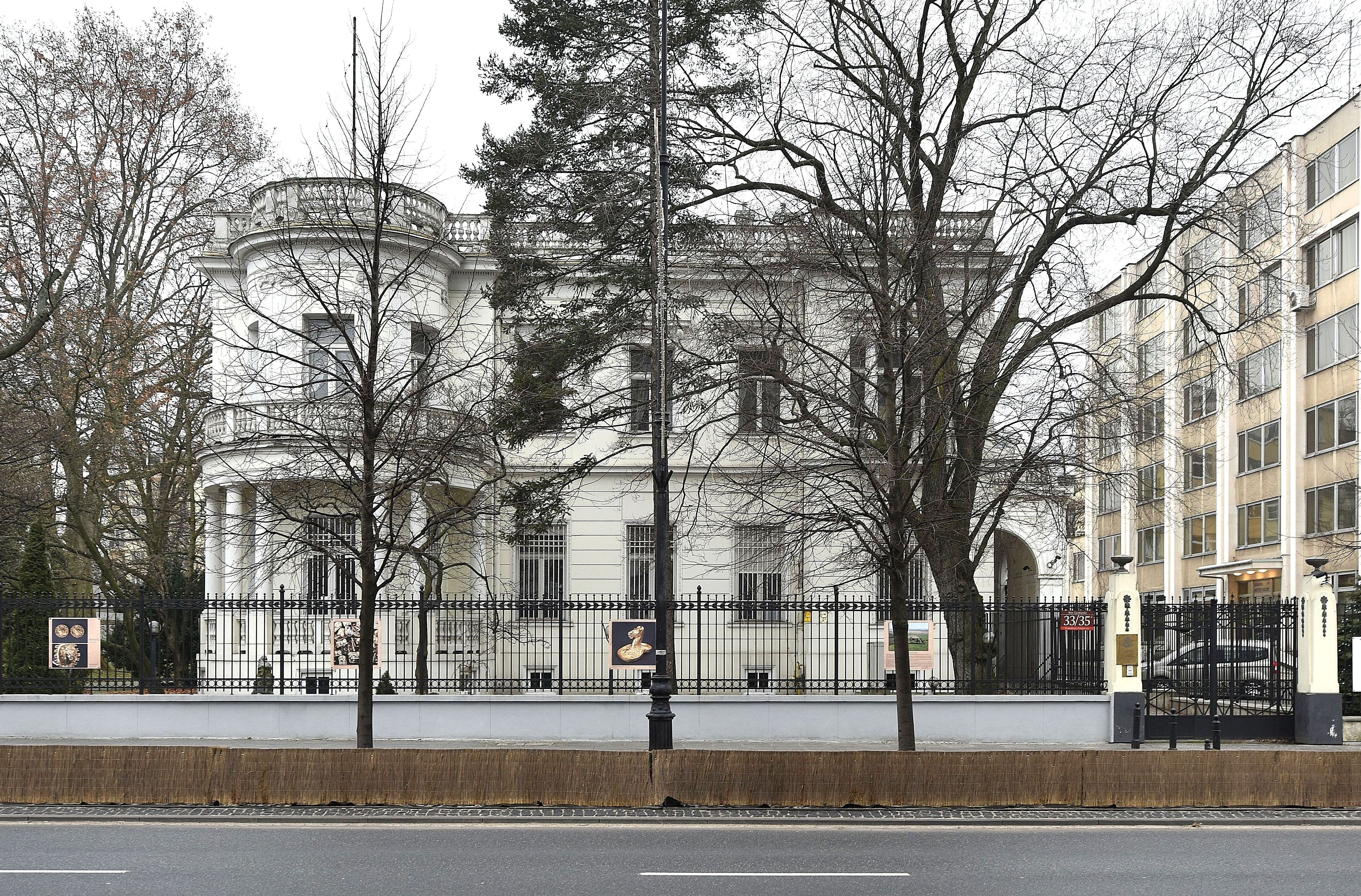
Embassy of Bulgaria in Warsaw

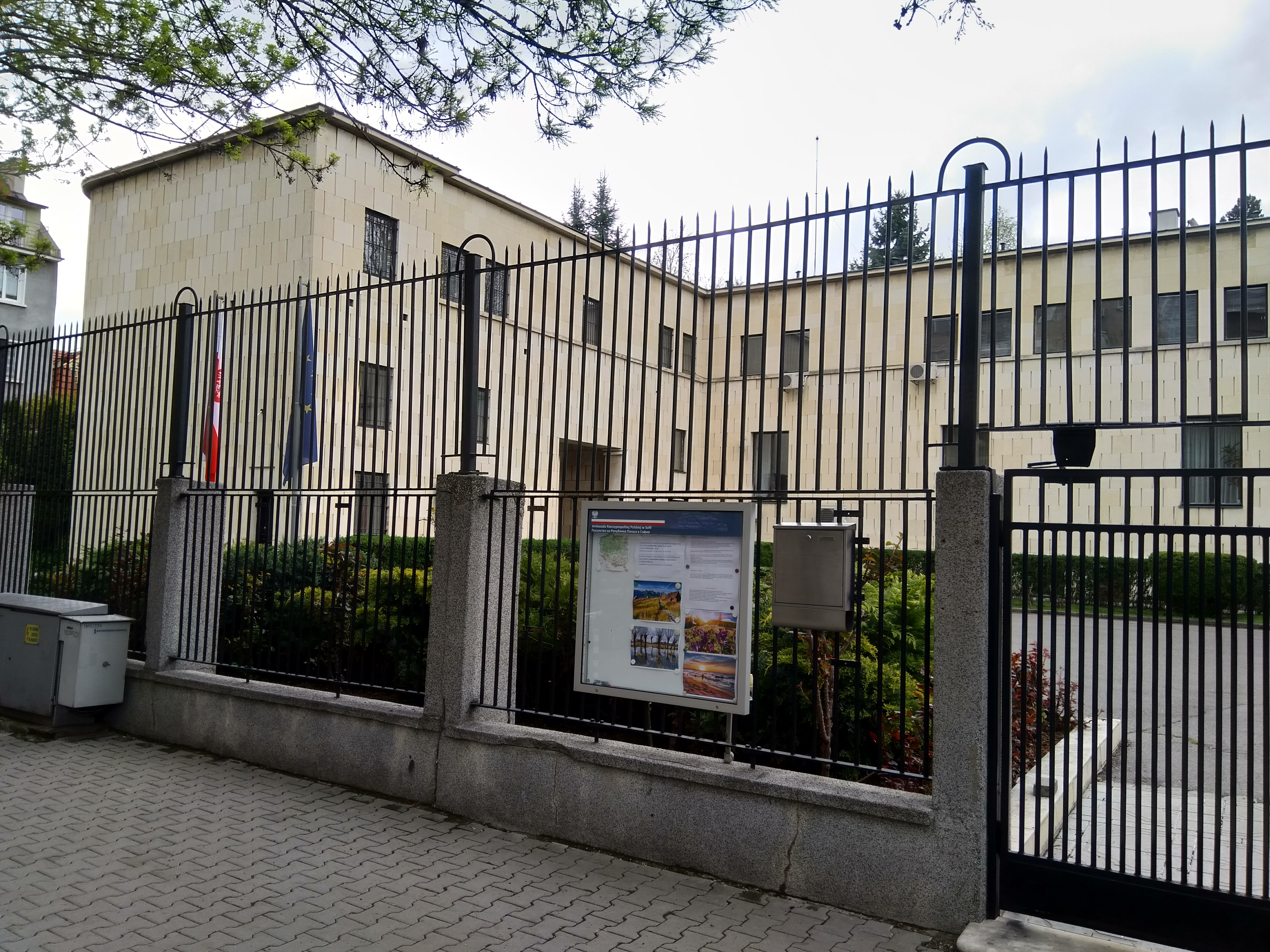
Embassy of Poland in Sofia

== See also ==
- Foreign relations of Bulgaria
- Foreign relations of Poland
- Poles in Bulgaria
