= Markiyan Lubkivsky =

Ukrainian diplomat

- Маркіян Лубківський
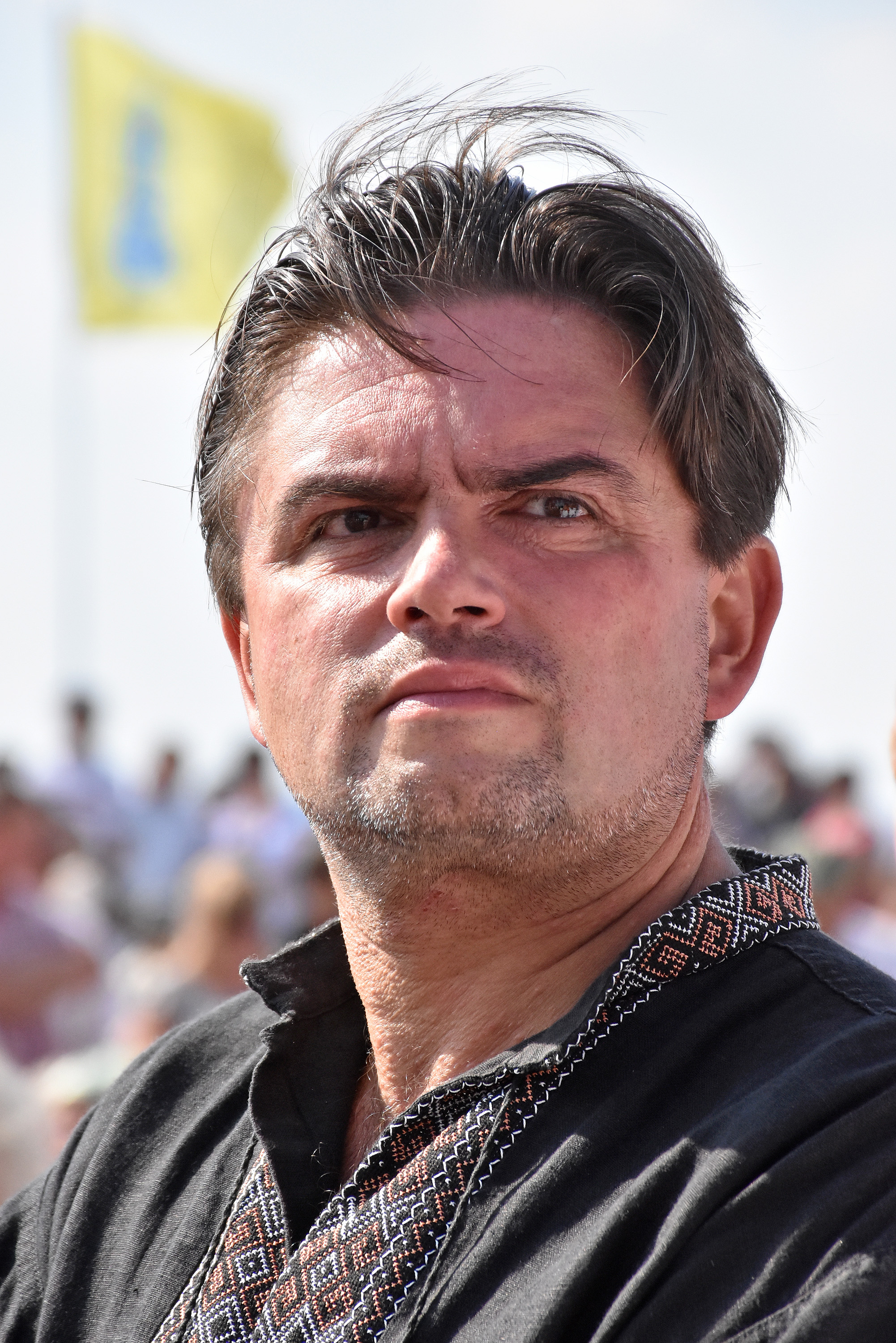

MFA of Ukraine Spokesperson
- In office 2003–2005
- Preceded by: Ihor Dolhov
- Succeeded by: Vasyl Filipchuk

Personal details
- Born: Markiyan Romanovych Lubkivsky; 2 September 1971 (age 55) Lviv, Ukrainian SSR, Soviet Union
- Parent: Roman Lubkivsky (father)
- Education: Faculty of Philology of the University of Lviv
- Occupation: Diplomat

Markiyan Romanovych Lubkivsky (Ukrainian: Маркіян Романович Лубківський; born 2 September 1971) is a Ukrainian diplomat and politician. He was spokesperson of the Foreign Ministry of Ukraine from 2003 to 2005. He has worked as a diplomat in the Republic of Croatia and Yugoslavia.

== Early life and education ==
Lubkivsky was born in Lviv, on September 2, 1971. He is the son of Ukrainian author and politician Roman Lubkivsky. Lubkivsky graduated from Ivan Franko National University of Lviv.

== Professional career ==
From August 1995 to March 1996, Lubkivsky was an attaché for the Europe and America department of the Ministry of Foreign Affairs of Ukraine.

From 2003 to 2005, Lubkivsky was the spokesperson for the Ministry of Foreign Affairs.

In 2005, he began working as a deputy state secretary of Ukraine, president's adviser. He left this role in 2006.

From 2006 to 2009, Lubkivsky was part of a diplomatic mission in Croatia. While there, he led cultural events such as exhibitions and concerts, and published Ukrainian poetry in Croatian and Croatian poetry in Ukrainian. While Lubkivsky was in Croatia, it would become the first country in the EU to introduce a visa-free regime for short term trips of Ukrainian citizens.

Lubkivsky was the UEFA Ukraine 2012 tournament director. In 2012, Lubkivsky became the head of the Organizing Committee for EuroBasket 2015 in Ukraine. He remained in this position until 2014.

On September 3, 2014, it was announced that Lubkivsky would be appointed Security Service of Ukraine chief advisor. In this role, he would manage communications and the flow of information regarding the SSU. In June 2015 he resigns from his post.

== Diplomatic rank ==
Lubkivsky has held the rank of Ambassador Extraordinary and Plenipotentiary of Ukraine since 2008.

== Personal life ==
Lubkivsky is married, and has a son and a daughter. His brother, Danylo Lubkivsky, is also a diplomat.

== Awards ==
- Order of Duke Branimir for significant contribution to the development of Ukrainian-Croatian relations (May 2003).
- Order of Merit III for significant personal contribution to the preparation of EURO 2012 in Ukraine, successful implementation of infrastructure, public safety during the tournament, raising the international prestige of Ukraine, high professionalism (June 2012).
