= Andrzej Papierz =

Polish politician

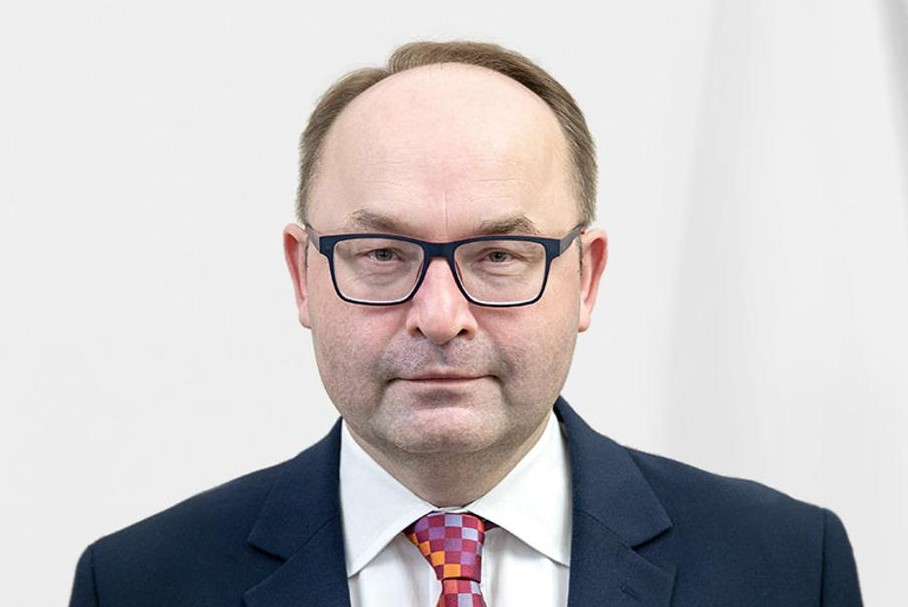

Poland Ambassador to Montenegro
- In office 2023–2024
- Appointed by: Andrzej Duda
- Preceded by: Artur Dmochowski

Director General of the Foreign Service
- In office 22 October 2018 – 13 April 2021
- Appointed by: Jacek Czaputowicz
- Preceded by: Maciej Szymański
- Succeeded by: Maciej Karasiński

Undersecretary of State in the Ministry of Foreign Affairs
- In office 3 April 2018 – 22 October 2021
- Appointed by: Mateusz Morawiecki

Poland Consul General to Istanbul
- In office 2017–2018
- Preceded by: Grzegorz Michalski
- Succeeded by: Joanna Pilecka

Poland Consul General to Almaty
- In office 2013–2016
- Preceded by: Wiesław Osuchowski
- Succeeded by: Radosław Gruk

Poland Ambassador to Bulgaria
- In office 2007–2010
- Appointed by: Lech Kaczyński
- President: Georgi Parvanov
- Preceded by: Sławomir Dąbrowa
- Succeeded by: Leszek Hensel

Personal details
- Born: 21 November 1966 (age 59) Frampol, Poland
- Spouse: Krystyna
- Children: 5
- Education: University of Warsaw
- Profession: Diplomat, journalist

Andrzej Papierz (born 21 November 1966 in Frampol) is a Polish journalist and diplomat. He has served as the Ambassador of Poland to Montenegro (2023–2024) and Bulgaria (2007–2010), the Undersecretary of State at the Ministry of Foreign Affairs (2018), and the Director General of the Foreign Service (2018–2021).

== Life ==
Papierz holds an M.A. in history from the University of Warsaw; he defended his thesis in 1999. During his studies, he was a board member of the Independent Students’ Association. He was also active in underground Solidarity and was several times detained for political reasons. He was co-founder and one of the leaders of the Republican League.

In 1990, Papierz became a journalist at the Tygodnik Solidarność weekly. Between 1991 and 1993, he was working for the Office for State Protection, being responsible for analysing the political situation in the states of the then collapsing Soviet Union. In 1993, he returned to journalism. Following work for the Polish Radio, he worked for Polsat TV, Telewizja Polska, Życie daily, RTL 7 TV. He was foreign correspondent in the Caucasus region. In 1998, he joined the Chancellery of the Prime Minister, becoming the Deputy Director, and then Director of Government Information Centre.

From 2001 to 2006, he held the position of the Director of the Polish Institute in Sofia. Afterwards, he was the Director of the Human Resources and Training Department at the MFA. In 2007, he was nominated ambassador to Bulgaria, ending his term in 2010. Later, he was serving at the Embassy in Kabul, Afghanistan, and as a Senior Advisor to commanders of the ISAF’s Polish Military Contingent in Ghazni Province. Next, for a couple of months he was posted to Belgrade. From 2013 to 2016, he was Consul-General in Almaty, being in charge of majority of Kazakhstan and whole Kyrgyzstan. For the next two years, he was on the same position in Istanbul, Turkey (2017–2018). From April to October 2018 he was the Undersecretary of State at the MFA covering Polish Community Abroad, and Public Diplomacy issues. From 22 October 2018 to 13 April 2021 Papierz was the Director General of the Foreign Service. Afterwards, he worked at the European Policy Department, MFA. In June 2023, Papierz was nominated ambassador to Montenegro. He ended his term in 2024.

Married to Krystyna, with five children. Beside Polish, he speaks Bulgarian, Russian, and English languages. He has also passive knowledge of Serbian and Macedonian.

== Honours ==
- Decoration of Honor Meritorious for Polish Culture (2000)
- Medal of Merit for National Defence (2011)
- Afghanistan Star Medal (2012)
- Afghanistan Campaign Medal (2012)
- Cross of Freedom and Solidarity (2015)
- Pro Patria Medal (2016)
- Officer's Cross of the Order of Polonia Restituta (2019)
- Medal of the Centenary of Regained Independence (2021)
