= Paweł Czerwiński =

Polish diplomat

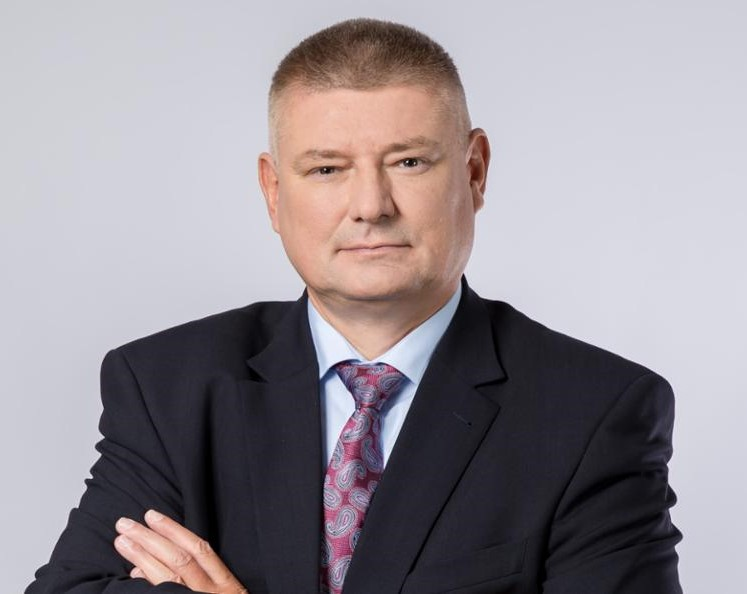

6th Poland Ambassador to Slovenia
- In office 17 September 2015 – 29 February 2020
- Preceded by: Cezary Król
- Succeeded by: Krzysztof Olendzki

7th Poland Ambassador to Croatia
- Incumbent
- Assumed office 2023
- Preceded by: Andrzej Jasionowski

Personal details
- Born: August 25, 1965 (age 61) Kraków
- Children: 1 son
- Education: Jagiellonian University
- Profession: Diplomat

Paweł Czerwiński (born 25 August 1965, in Kraków) is a Polish diplomat, ambassador to Slovenia (2015–2020) and Croatia (since 2023).

== Life ==
Czerwiński graduated in 1989 from Jagiellonian University, Faculty of Law and Administration. He started working for the Kraków public prosecutor's office. In 1990, he joined the Ministry of Foreign Affairs of Poland, starting from the attaché post at the Embassy of Poland in Moscow. Between 1991 and 1996 he served at the embassy in Riga, supervising legal, political and economic relations. At that time, he authored a manual on restitution of the properties nationalized after World War II. For the next two years, he was desk officer for relations with Lithuania. From 1998 to 2002 he was First Secretary for political affairs at the embassy in Ljubljana, for the first three years being in charge of not only Slovenia but also Bosnia and Herzegovina. In autumn 2002, he was back in Warsaw, as a specialist for Serbia, Montenegro, Kosovo, and Bosnia and Herzegovina. Since August 2004, Czerwiński has been heading as chargé d’affaires the embassy in Ankara. In July 2006 he became deputy chief of mission in Belgrade, being responsible for Polish-Serbian relations, Polish-Montenegrin relations (until the embassy in Podgorica in 2007 was opened), as well as cooperation with Polish soldiers and police officers serving in Kosovo. Upon return from Belgrade in August 2012, he worked at the Diplomatic Protocol and the Inspectorate of the Foreign Service. Since September 2013, he held the position of the Minister's Secretariat deputy director.

On 24 July 2015, he was nominated Poland ambassador to Slovenia, presenting his letter of credence on 17 September 2015. He completed his mission on 29 February 2020. On 1 October 2020, he was appointed to the position of foreign policy advisor to the President of the Republic of Poland. On 19 July 2023, Czerwiński was nominated ambassador to Croatia.

Czerwiński is married to Agnieszka Czerwińska, with a son. Besides Polish, he speaks English, Russian, Serbian, Slovene, and French.
