= Esther Gitman =

American historian of the Holocaust in Yugoslavia

- אסתר גיטמן
- Born: September 20, 1939 (age 87); Sarajevo, Kingdom of Yugoslavia
- Occupations: Writer, historian
- Years active: 1999-present

Esther Gitman (Hebrew: אסתר גיטמן, born September 20, 1939) is an American historian and scholar on the Holocaust specifically in the Nazi German puppet state known as the Independent State of Croatia (Croatian: Nezavisna Država Hrvatska, NDH) during World War II. Gitman received the Order of Duke Branimir in 2019 from the Croatian President.

== Early life ==
Esther Gitman was born on 20 September 1939 in Sarajevo to a Jewish mother and father who were from Croatia. Her father died when she was only four yours old. Yugoslavia was invaded from all sides by the Axis powers, led by Nazi Germany and Fascist Italy on 6 April 1941. The Royal Yugoslav Army surrendered on 17 April, and the Nazis created a puppet state, the Independent State of Croatia (Croatian: Nezavisna Država Hrvatska or NDH) under dictator Ante Pavelić. The NDH incorporated almost all of modern-day Croatia, all of modern-day Bosnia and Herzegovina and parts of modern-day Serbia, but the Istrian Peninsula and Dalmatia were annexed by the Italians in May 1941, as part of the Treaties of Rome. NDH authorities, led by the ultranationalist Ustaše militas committed violent atrocities against the Serb, Jewish and Roma populations living within the borders of the new country. The NDH was the only regime in Nazi-occupied Europe that ran its own concentration camps.

The four year old Gitman and her mother escaped Sarajevo in October 1941 to the Italian zone of occupation on the Adriatic, where Jews seeking refuge from the Nazis and the Ustaše were interned by the Italians but were provided sanctuary and treated better. After Italy capitulated in September 1943 and the Nazis occupied the region, the Yugoslav partisans helped them escape to Santa Maria al Bagno in southern Italy via boat, both were able to survive the Holocaust thanks to the help of Righteous Gentiles. After the war ended in 1945, Yugoslavia was reestablished as a socialist state under the partisan leader Tito and the two moved back to Sarajevo. In 1948 the Gitmans made aliyah to Israel where Esther lived for 19 years and served in the Israeli army. She married her husband Israel and had a daughter, Michal. Following the Six-Day War, the family moved to Montreal where Israel earned his PhD, before eventually settling in New York, where they have lived since 1972. Michal is married to Dan Drillich and has 6 children. Gitman is fluent in Croatian, Ladino, Italian, Hebrew and English.

The Jewish populations of Croatia and Bosnia were all but nearly annihilated during the Holocaust. Out of the 39,000 Jews living within the borders of the NDH in April 1941, more than 30,000 were murdered in Nazi concentration camps such as Jasenovac and Auschwitz. Only 9,000 (50%) survived either by escaping to the Italian occupation zones, Partisan held territory or joining the Yugoslav Partisans. The NDH is considered by historians to be one of the only nations in occupied Europe where the Nazis and their allies succeeded in “solving” the Jewish question. Siegfried Kasche, the German attaché in Zagreb reported to Berlin on 18 April 1944 saying “Croatia is one of the countries in which the Jewish problem has been solved."

== Scholarship career ==
She earned a bachelor's degree in history and sociology from Carleton University in Ottawa, Ontario, Canada, and a graduate degree in criminal justice from Long Island University. She earned a PhD from City University in New York in Jewish history. She began her research into the Croatian-Jewish history in 1999 with her dissertation, entitled Rescue of Jews in the Independent State of Croatia, 1941–1945. In 2002, she received a Fulbright scholarship to travel to Croatia to continue her research.

In 2007 Gitman received a post-doctoral grant from the United States Holocaust Memorial Museum. In 2008, she participated in a conference on Aloysius Cardinal Stepinac, the senior member of the Catholic Church among the Croats in the Second World War. Gitman has compiled databases and documents on Jews from Sarajevo and Zagreb who survived the Holocaust.

In 2011, she published When Courage Prevailed: The Rescue and Survival of Jews in the Independent State of Croatia 1941–1945, with the subject of rescues and survival of Jews in Independent State of Croatia and about the role of Aloysius Cardinal Stepinac during that time. In the interview for the Croatian daily Večernji list, Gitman stated that, for her, "Stepinac is a holy man who saved many Jews".

In 2019, for her research and promotion of truth in relation to Croatian history of 20th century, she received the Order of Duke Branimir by Croatian President Kolinda Grabar-Kitarović, as well as published a new book entirely dedicated to Stepinac, titled Alojzije Stepinac - Pillar of Human Rights.
