= Order of Duke Branimir =

Medal awarded by Croatia

Order of Duke Branimir Red kneza Branimira
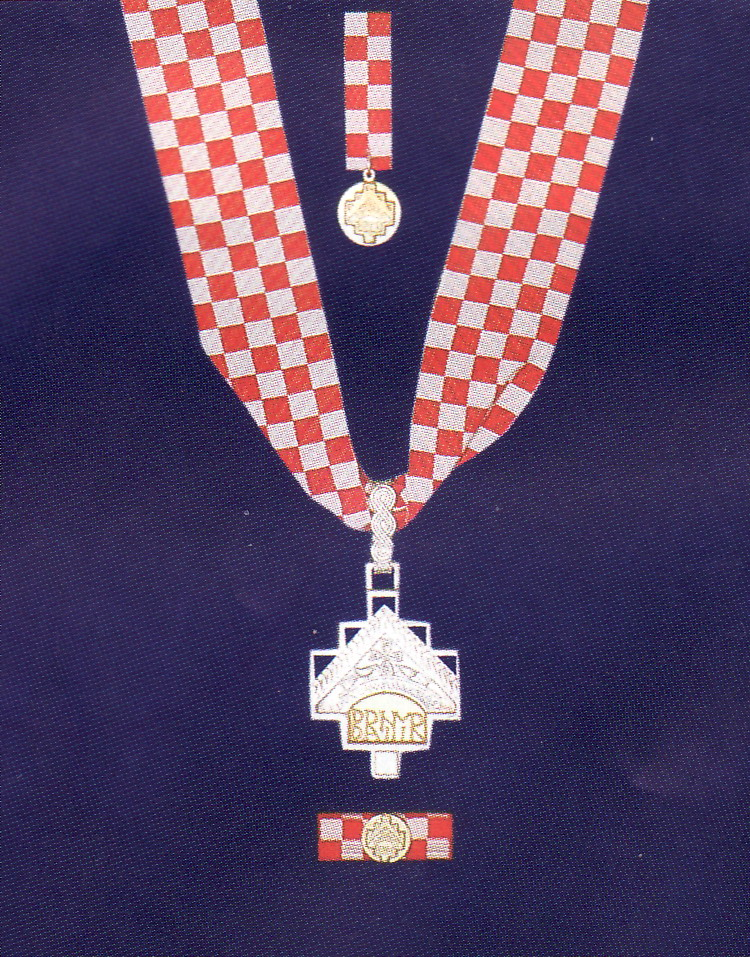
- Type: State order
- Awarded for: excellence in promoting Croatia in international relations
- Country: Republic of Croatia
- Presented by: the President of Croatia
- Eligibility: Croatian and foreign citizens
- Status: Active
- Established: 10 March 1995
- Ribbon of the Order of Duke Branimir

Precedence
- Next (higher): Order of Duke Trpimir
- Next (lower): Order of Duke Domagoj

The Order of Duke Branimir (Croatian: Red kneza Branimira) is the 7th most important medal given by the Republic of Croatia. The order was founded on 1 April 1995. The medal is awarded for excellence in promoting Croatia in international relations. It is named after duke Branimir of Croatia.

== Notable recipients ==
- Alain Erlande-Brandenburg
- Alexander Scrymgeour, 12th Earl of Dundee
- Ante Kostelić
- Anvar Azimov
- Croatia's 2018 FIFA World Cup squad including:
  - Andrej Kramarić
  - Ante Rebić
  - Danijel Subašić
  - Dejan Lovren
  - Domagoj Vida
  - Dominik Livaković
  - Duje Ćaleta-Car
  - Filip Bradarić
  - Ivan Perišić
  - Ivan Rakitić
  - Ivan Strinić
  - Josip Pivarić
  - Lovre Kalinić
  - Luka Modrić
  - Marcelo Brozović
  - Mario Mandžukić
  - Marko Pjaca
  - Mateo Kovačić
  - Milan Badelj
  - Nikola Kalinić
  - Šime Vrsaljko
  - Tin Jedvaj
  - Vedran Ćorluka
- Darko Bekić
- Davor Ivo Stier
- Esther Gitman
- Sir Fitzroy Maclean
- Ivan Đikić
- Johann Georg Reißmüller
- Julian Grenfell, 3rd Baron Grenfell
- Juraj Priputen
- Karel Kühnl
- Maciej Szymański
- Mahi Nesimi
- Marin Barišić
- Markiyan Lubkivsky
- Marko Perković
- Mate Parlov
- Mike Moore
- Milan Moguš
- Mirko Šundov
- Miroslav Blažević
- Miroslav Šeparović
- Orrin Hatch
- Ratko Rudić
- Sandra Perković Elkasević
- Shen Zhifei
- Slobodan Lang
- Thomas Schultze
- Valentina Tereshkova
- Valter Matošević
- W. Robert Kohorst
- Wiesław Tarka
- Ole Henrik Frijs-Madsen
