= List of ambassadors of Poland to Montenegro =

Poland Ambassador to Montenegro
- Coat of arms of Poland
- Style: Mr. Ambassador (informal); His Excellency (diplomatic)
- Reports to: Polish Ministry of Foreign Affairs
- Seat: Podgorica, Montenegro
- Appointer: President of Poland
- Term length: No fixed term
- Website: Embassy of Poland Montenegro

The Republic of Poland Ambassador to Montenegro is Poland's foremost diplomatic representative in Montenegro and head of the Poland's diplomatic mission in Podgorica.

== History ==
Poland established diplomatic relations with Montenegro shortly after it gained independence in 2006. In 2008 Poland opened its embassy in Podgorica.

== List of ambassadors of Poland to Montenegro ==
- 2006–2011: Jarosław Lindenberg (chargé d’affaires)
- 2011–2015: Grażyna Sikorska
- 2015–2017: Irena Tatarzyńska
- 2018–2023: Artur Dmochowski
- 2023–2024: Andrzej Papierz

== See also ==
- List of diplomatic missions of Poland
