= Andrzej Jasionowski =

Polish diplomat

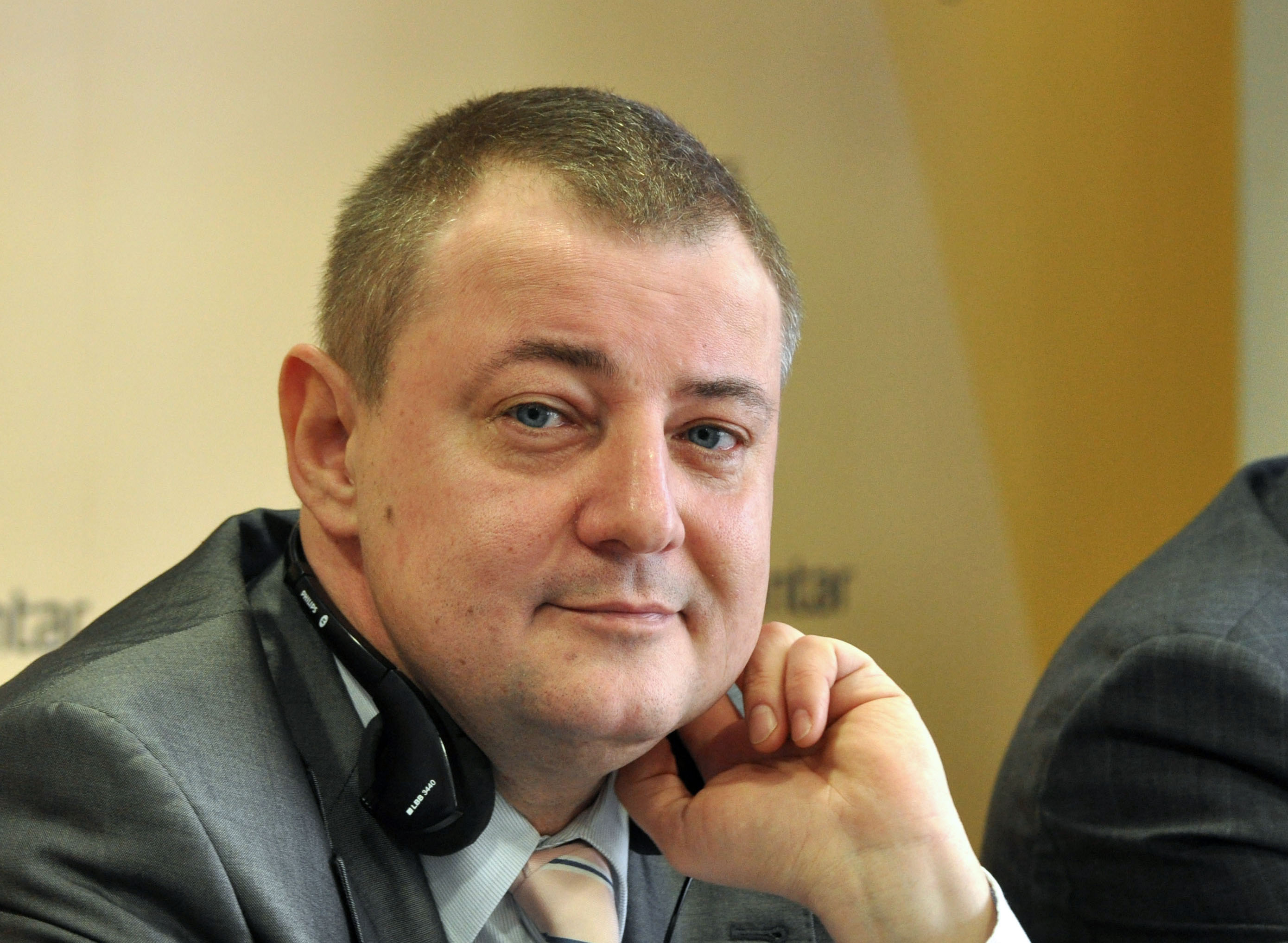

3rd Poland Ambassador to Serbia
- In office 2009–2014
- Preceded by: Maciej Szymański
- Succeeded by: Aleksander Chećko

6th Poland Ambassador to Croatia
- In office January 2018 – 31 August 2023
- Preceded by: Maciej Szymański
- Succeeded by: Paweł Czerwiński

Poland Ambassador to Bosnia and Herzegovina
- In office 2023 – November 2025
- Preceded by: Jarosław Lindenberg

Personal details
- Born: 29 November 1964 (age 61) Łódź, Poland
- Education: University of Warsaw
- Profession: Diplomat, civil servant

Andrzej Edward Jasionowski (born 29 November 1964) is a Polish civil servant and diplomat; ambassador to Serbia (2009–2014), Croatia (2018–2023), and Bosnia and Herzegovina (2023–2025).

== Life ==
Jasionowski, following his studies at the University of Łódź, graduated in 1991 from the Faculty of Law and Administration, University of Warsaw, specializing in international public law.

From 1986 to 1989 he was chairman of the Independent Students’ Association (NZS) of the University of Łódź, president of the Alliance of Independent Students’ Associations of Łódź’s higher schools, and member of the NZS’s National Coordinating Committee.

After 1990, he was working for the Ministry of Transportation and Marine Economy and Office for State Protection. In 1992, he joined the Ministry of Foreign Affairs of Poland. Between 1992 and 1994, he was posted at the embassy in Lagos as deputy commercial counsellor. From 1995, he was consul in Almaty. In 1997, he was posted to Stockholm as consul. From 2000, he was at the MFA’s Department of Polish Diaspora. That year, for a couple of months, he was seconded to Oslo. In 2002, he became head of the Consular Department at the embassy in Helsinki. From 2006 to 2008, he was Director of the Department of Consular Affairs and Polish Diaspora. Between 14 October 2009 and 2014, he served as an Ambassador to Serbia. Later, he was Deputy Director, and Director of the Department of Consular Affairs. From August 2016 to 2017 he was holding post of the Director General of Foreign Service. Since January 2018 he was representing Poland as ambassador to Croatia. He finished his term on 31 August 2023. In October 2023, he was nominated ambassador to Bosnia and Herzegovina and ended his mission in November 2025.

Besides Polish, Jasionowski speaks English, Russian, and Croatian. In his youth, he trained archery.

== Honours ==
- Cross of Freedom and Solidarity, 2017
