= List of ambassadors of Poland to Bulgaria =

Poland Ambassador to Bulgaria
- Coat of arms of Poland
- Style: Mr. Ambassador (informal); His Excellency (diplomatic)
- Reports to: Polish Ministry of Foreign Affairs
- Seat: Sofia, Bulgaria
- Appointer: President of Poland
- Term length: No fixed term
- Website: Embassy of Poland, Bulgaria

The Republic of Poland Ambassador to Bulgaria is the Poland's foremost diplomatic representative in Bulgaria, and in charge of the Polish diplomatic mission in Sofia.

As with all Poland Ambassadors, the ambassador to Bulgaria is nominated by the President of Poland and confirmed by the Prime Minister and Parliamentary Commission of the Foreign Affairs. The ambassador serves at the pleasure of the president, and enjoys full diplomatic immunity.

The Embassy of Poland in Bulgaria is located in Sofia; additionally, there is an Honorary Consulate located in Nesebar.

== List of ambassadors of Poland to Bulgaria ==
=== Second Polish Republic ===
- 1918–1925 – Tadeusz Stanisław Grabowski (Envoy)
- 1925–1930 – Władysław Baranowski (Envoy)
- 1930–1941 – Adam Tarnowski (Envoy)

=== Polish People's Republic ===
- 1945–1948 – Edmund Zalewski (Envoy)
- 1948 – Stefan Chanachowicz (chargé d'affaires a.i.)
- 1948–1953 – Aleksander Barchacz
- 1953–1956 – Marian Szczepański
- 1956–1957 – Leon Szyguła
- 1957–1964 – Aleksander Juszkiewicz
- 1964–1970 – Ryszard Nieszporek
- 1970–1973 – Jerzy Szyszko
- 1973–1978 – Józef Muszyński
- 1978–1981 – Lucjan Motyka
- 1981–1986 – Władysław Napieraj
- 1986–1990 – Wiesław Bek

=== Third Polish Republic ===
- 1990–1991 – Władysław Pożoga
- 1991–1997 – Tadeusz Wasilewski
- 1997–1998 – Romuald Kunat
- 1998–2003 – Jarosław Lindenberg
- 2003–2006 – Sławomir Dąbrowa
- 2006–2007 – Irena Tatarzyńska (chargé d'affaires)
- 2007–2010 – Andrzej Papierz
- 2010–2014 – Leszek Hensel
- 2014–2018 – Krzysztof Krajewski
- 2019–2025 – Maciej Szymański
