= Johann Georg Reißmüller =

German journalist (1932–2018)

- Born: 20 February 1932; Leitmeritz, Germany
- Died: 10 December 2018 (aged 86); Frankfurt am Main, Germany
- Occupations: Journalist; Newspaper publisher
- Organization: Frankfurter Allgemeine Zeitung
- Awards: honorary doctorate of the University of Zagreb; Order of Duke Branimir

Johann Georg Reißmüller (20 February 1932 – 10 December 2018) was a German journalist, and co-publisher of the Frankfurter Allgemeine Zeitung (FAZ). He was a correspondent in Belgrade, then the capital of Yugoslavia, from 1967 to 1971. When the country broke up in the early 1990s, he became instrumental in Germany recognizing Croatia and Slovenia as sovereign states.

== Career ==
Born in Leitmeritz in today's Czech Republic, Reißmüller grew up in Bohemia. He took singing lessons as a child. He had to leave after the 1946 Expulsion of Germans from Czechoslovakia, and was deported to Vorpommern. His father was arrested in 1950, and Reißmüller escaped to West Berlin. Reißmüller studied law at the University of Tübingen where he obtained his J.D. in 1958, under Günter Dürig, with a dissertation about the limits of the common right to freedom (Schranken des allgemeinen Freiheitsrechts). From 1957 to 1961 Reißmüller worked for the JuristenZeitung (JZ) in Tübingen.

He joined the FAZ on 1 April 1961, writing for the political editorial department. He was a reporter in Belgrade from 1967 to 1971, then the capital of Yugoslavia. His topics were communism in Eastern Europe, socialism in Yugoslavia and the churches there. In 1974, he became one of five publishers (Herausgeber) of the FAZ.

Reißmüller supported in his articles, numbering almost 130 between 1990 and 1992, the recognition of Croatia and Slovenia, and was credited with his influence on politics when their independence was recognised on 15 January 1992. In 1995, he received an honorary doctorate from the University of Zagreb which was the only award he accepted.

Reißmüller retired from the FAZ on 1 March 1999. He performed songs from the early German Democratic Republic at the farewell celebration, accompanied by the journalist and musicologist Heribert Klein. Several songs were published as a CD by Zweitausendeins, Uns gefällt diese Welt – Lieder der frühen DDR.

Reißmüller died on 10 December 2018 in Frankfurt am Main.

== Work ==
=== Music ===
- Johann Georg Reißmüller: Uns gefällt diese Welt – Lieder der frühen DDR. 55 min CD, Biton 4007 bei Zweitausendeins, Frankfurt/M. 2000.

=== Literature ===
- Fritz Behrendt (author), Johann Georg Reißmüller (preface): Eine Feder für die Freiheit: Zeichnungen und Karikaturen 1950–2000. Deutsche Verlags-Anstalt DVA, 2000, ISBN 3-421-05347-2.

=== Books ===
- Johann Georg Reißmüller: Jugoslawien. Vielvölkerstaat zwischen Ost und West. Diederichs Verlag, Düsseldorf 1971, ISBN 3-424-00409-X.
- Johann Georg Reißmüller (ed.): 111 Zeitgenossen. 1st edition. Societäts-Verlag, Frankfurt 1977.
- Johann Georg Reißmüller: Die vergessene Hälfte. Osteuropa und wir. Langen Müller-Verlag, 1986, ISBN 3-7844-2124-5.
- Der Krieg vor unserer Haustür. Hintergründe der historischen Tragödie. Deutsche Verlags Anstalt, Stuttgart 1991, ISBN 3-421-06543-8.
- Die bosnische Tragödie. Deutsche Verlags Anstalt, Stuttgart 1993, ISBN 3-421-06657-4.
- Johann Georg Reißmüller (ed.): Dazu möchte ich bemerken--: Leserbriefe in der Frankfurter Allgemeinen Zeitung aus 50 Jahren. Keyser, 1999.

=== Essay ===
- Johann Georg Reissmüller: Das Monopol des Bundesverfassungsgerichts aus Art. 18 des Grundgesetzes. Juristenzeitung 1960, pp. 529ff

== Honours ==
- University of Zagreb awarded him honorary doctorate on 5 April 1995.
- posthumously decorated with Order of Duke Branimir "for special merits in recognizing Croatian independence and promoting the truth about the Croatian War of Independence" by Kolinda Grabar-Kitarović in November 2019
