= Maciej Szymański =

Polish diplomat (born 1957)

Maciej Szymański Doctor of Philosophy
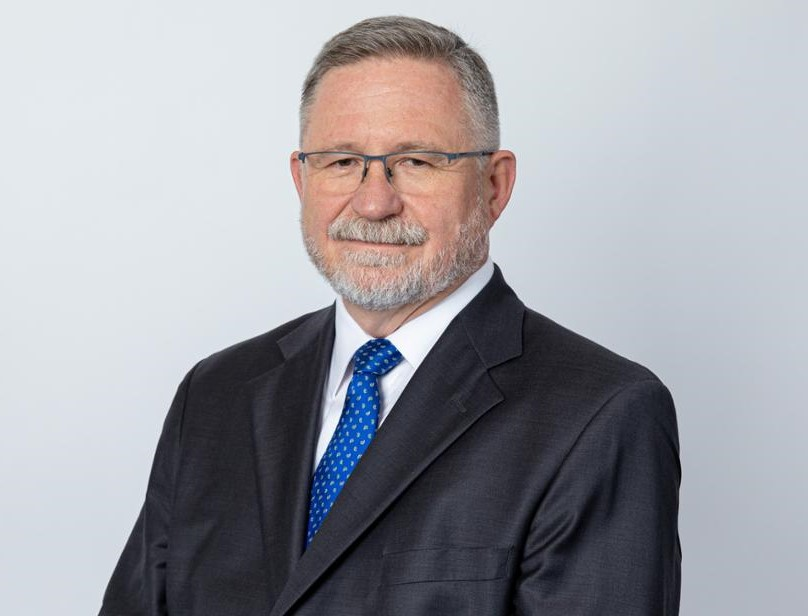

Poland Ambassador to Bulgaria
- In office April 2019 – November 2025
- Appointed by: Andrzej Duda
- President: Rumen Radev
- Preceded by: Krzysztof Krajewski

Director General of the Foreign Service
- In office February 2018 – October 2018
- Appointed by: Jacek Czaputowicz
- Preceded by: Andrzej Jasionowski
- Succeeded by: Andrzej Papierz

Poland Ambassador to Croatia
- In office January 2013 – July 2017
- Appointed by: Bronisław Komorowski
- President: Ivo Josipović; Kolinda Grabar-Kitarović
- Preceded by: Wiesław Tarka
- Succeeded by: Andrzej Jasionowski

Poland Ambassador to Serbia
- In office 2005–2009
- Appointed by: Aleksander Kwaśniewski
- President: Svetozar Marović; Boris Tadić
- Preceded by: Tadeusz Diem
- Succeeded by: Andrzej Jasionowski

Poland Ambassador to Slovenia
- In office 1998–2002
- Appointed by: Aleksander Kwaśniewski
- President: Milan Kučan
- Preceded by: Jan Tombiński
- Succeeded by: Janusz Jesionek

Personal details
- Born: 25 January 1957 (age 69) Milicz, Poland
- Children: 4
- Education: University of Silesia in Katowice
- Profession: Diplomat, philologist

Maciej Grzegorz Szymański (born 25 January 1957, Milicz) is a Polish philologist and diplomat who has served as Polish ambassador to Slovenia (1998–2002), Serbia (2005–2009), Croatia (2013–2017), and Bulgaria (2019–2025).

== Life ==
Szymański grew up in Międzyrzec Podlaski, and finished high school in Wrocław. In 1981, he graduated from Yugoslav studies at the University of Silesia in Katowice, specialising in Macedonian and Serbo-Croatian languages.

In 1982, he began his professional career at the Ossolineum library in Wrocław. Between 1984 and 1992, he worked as a scientist at the Slavic Institute of the Polish Academy of Sciences. He obtained his Ph.D. thesis on Slavic linguistics there.

In 1992, Szymański joined the Ministry of Foreign Affairs. He began as a head of the unit at the Consular Department. In 1995, he became deputy director there. In 1998, he was director of the Department of Central and South-Eastern Europe. That year he was nominated ambassador to Slovenia, next year being accredited also to newly formed embassy in Sarajevo, Bosnia and Herzegovina. In 2002, he returned to the Consular Department, as a head of unit, and then as a director. Between 2005 and 2009, he was ambassador to Serbia and Montenegro, and since 2006, after the dissolution, to Serbia. Back at the Ministry, he was serving as a director of the Department for Cooperation with Polish Diaspora and Poles Abroad.

In January 2013, Szymański started his mission as an ambassador to Croatia, ending his term in July 2017. Next, for a year, he has been director of the Diplomatic Academy. From February to October 2018, he was the Director General of the Foreign Service. In April 2019, he was nominated ambassador to Bulgaria. He ended his mission in November 2025.

Szymański is married, with four children. In his free time, he photographs nature, birds mostly. His works have been publishing in books, atlases, and magazines, including National Geographic.

== Honours ==
- Knight of the Order of Polonia Restituta, Poland, 2011
- Knight of the Order of Duke Branimir, Croatia, 2017
- Order of the cavalier of Madara, Bulgaria, 2025
