= Artur Dmochowski =

Polish journalist

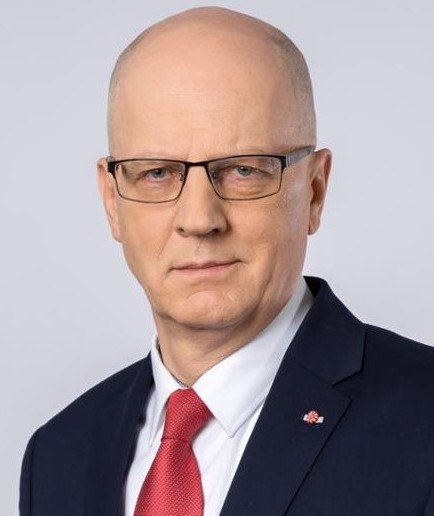

Poland Ambassador to Montenegro
- In office 31 August 2018 – 31 May 2023
- Appointed by: Andrzej Duda
- President: Milo Đukanović
- Preceded by: Irena Tatarzyńska
- Succeeded by: Andrzej Papierz

Chairman of the Polish Press Agency
- In office 9 May 2016 – 9 October 2017
- Appointed by: National Media Council
- Preceded by: Jerzy Paciorkowski
- Succeeded by: Wojciech Surmacz

Personal details
- Born: 13 June 1959 (age 67) Kraków
- Spouse: Monika Dmochowska
- Children: 2
- Education: Jagiellonian University; Middlebury Institute of International Studies at Monterey
- Profession: Journalist, columnist, historian, diplomat

Artur Antoni Dmochowski (born 13 June 1959 in Kraków) is a Polish journalist, historian, and diplomat, who has served as Poland's ambassador to Montenegro (2018–2023) and Thailand (2023–2024).

== Life ==
Dmochowski had started, in 1978, his studies at the AGH University of Science and Technology, Kraków. In 1986, he graduated from history at the Jagiellonian University. He has been educated also at the University of Maryland (postgraduate studies in foreign policy) and, thanks to Fulbright grant, in 1995, he gained MA from the Middlebury Institute of International Studies at Monterey, California.

In 1980, he was spokesman of the Founding Committee of the AGH Independent Students’ Association. In 1984 and 1985, he was presiding the Student Self-Government and was member of the Senate of the Jagiellonian University. During the whole 1980s he was active in the underground publishing movement; being founder and editor-in-chief of the Od Nowa and Czas Solidarności magazines. He has been arrested and detained several times.

After the collapse of communism in 1989, he continued his work as an editor and journalist for, among others, Nowy Dziennik in New York, TVP3 Kraków, and Gazeta Polska. In 1993, he started his career at the Ministry of Foreign Affairs. He was representing Poland at the CSCE Peace Mission in Georgia (1994) and the OSCE Mission in Bosnia and Herzegovina (1996), among others. From 2000 to 2006 he was serving as a minister-counsellor at the Embassy in Rome. Since 2006, he was journalist again, founding and directing the TVP Historia channel. Since 2011, Dmochowski has been editor of Gazeta Polska and Gazeta Polska Codziennie daily. In November 2015 he was back at the Ministry of Foreign Affairs, on a post of a spokesman. From 9 May 2016 to 9 October 2017 he was chairman of the Polish Press Agency.

On 29 August 2018, Dmochowski was nominated ambassador to Montenegro, presenting his letter of credence on 6 September 2018. He ended his term on 31 May 2023. In June 2023 he was nominated ambassador to Thailand, accredited also to Cambodia. He returned from the posting in July 2024.

== Honours ==
- The Commander's Cross of the Order of Polonia Restituta (2017)
- Cross of Freedom and Solidarity (2016)
- Order of the Montenegrin Flag (2023)

== Books ==
- Zginął za Polskę bez komunistów. Zarys biografii Józefa Kurasia „Ognia”, Warszawa: Wydawnictwo CDN, 1987.
- Wietnam. Wojna bez zwycięzców, Kraków: Europa, 1991, 2000.
- Wietnam 1962–1975, Warszawa: Dom Wydawniczy Bellona, 2003.
- Kulisy kryzysu: o przyszłości Polski i Europy, Lublin; Warszawa: Wydawnictwo Słowa i Myśli, 2013.
- Między Unią a Rosją: o polskiej racji stanu, polityce zagranicznej i miejscu Polski w Unii Europejskiej, Lublin; Warszawa" Wydawnictwo Słowa i Myśli, 2013.
- Kościół "Wyborczej": największa operacja resortowych dzieci, Lublin: Wydawnictwo Słowa i Myśli, 2014.
- Najdłuższa wojna: przed Ukrainą był Wietnam, Lublin; Warszawa: Wydawnictwo Słowa i Myśli, 2014.
- Jak wygrać wybory, Lublin; Warszawa: Wydawnictwo Słowa i Myśli, 2014.
