= Grzegorz Lindenberg =

Polish journalist and sociologist (1955–2026)

Grzegorz Lindenberg (September 26, 1955 – November 20, 2026) was a Polish journalist and sociologist. He was one of the co-founders of Gazeta Wyborcza, General Director of Agora, founder and first editor-in-chief of Super Express, and one of founders of a right-wing anti-immigration website Euroislam.pl. He was also the president of two online businesses (SuperMedia in 1996 and eCard in 2000).

== Biography ==
In 1979 he obtained a degree in sociology. In 1985 he obtained a PhD Degree at the Institute of Sociology at the University of Warsaw. In the years 1985–1987 he was a researcher working at the Russian Research Center at Harvard University as part of a scholarship from the Kościuszko Foundation and a lecturer at the University of Boston.

From 1996 to 2004, he was a board member of the Stefan Batory Foundation in Warsaw.

From 2001 to his death in 2026, he was an independent consultant.

He was a brother to Jarosław Lindenberg.

Lindenberg died on November 20, 2026, aged 71.

== Novels ==
- Zmiana społeczna a świadomość polityczna, Warsaw 1986
- Świadomość społeczna wobec kryzysu i konfliktu społecznego (co-author; Krzysztof Nowak), Warsaw 1987
- Anna Maria Goławska, Toskania i okolice: przewodnik subiektywny (photography author), Warsaw 2006 ISBN 978-83-7386-327-9
- Goławska, Anna Maria, and Grzegorz Lindenberg. Włochy: podróż na południe. Warsaw: Wydawnictwo Nowy Świat, 2010 ISBN 978-83-7386-393-4
- Ludzkość poprawiona. Jak najbliższe lata zmienią świat w którym żyjemy, Wydawnictwo Otwarte, Warsaw 2018 ISBN 978-83-7515-545-7
- Wzbierająca fala. Europa wobec eksplozji demograficznej w Afryce, Fundacja Instytut Dyplomacji Europejskiej, Warsaw 2019 ISBN 978-83-953891-0-8
