= Darko Bekić =

Croatian historian

Foreign Policy Advisor
- In office 1990–1991
- President: Franjo Tuđman

Croatian Ambassador to the OSCE
- In office 1992–1996
- Preceded by: None
- Succeeded by: Mario Nobilo

Croatian Ambassador to the OUN Geneva
- In office 1996–1998
- Preceded by: Neven Madey
- Succeeded by: Spomenka Cek

Personal details
- Born: 18 January 1946 (age 80) Zagreb, Yugoslavia (now Croatia)
- Spouse: Andrea Bekić
- Children: 4
- Education: University of Zagreb; Université de Paris I-Panthéon

Darko Bekić (born January 18, 1946) is a Croatian historian, author, diplomat and foreign policy advisor to the first President of the Republic of Croatia Franjo Tuđman. He served, inter alia, as the Croatian Ambassador to the OSCE in Vienna (1992–1996) and as Permanent Representative of Croatia to the United Nations in Geneva (1996–1998). He authored the first-ever History of Croatian Diplomacy published in 2016 by Skolska Knjiga, Zagreb.

== Early life and education ==
Darko Bekić was born on January 18, 1946, in Zagreb. He started his higher education at the Faculty of Philosophy and the Faculty of Economics of the University of Zagreb, where he obtained his BA (1969) and MA degrees (1972) in the field of Development Economics. He continued his education by attending Cours de doctorate d'Universite at the Département de Science Politique de la Sorbonne, Université de Paris I-Panthéon in the field of International Relations of the Third World. He obtained his PhD degree in the field of International Relations at the Faculty of Political Science, University of Zagreb (1980).

== Career ==
Darko Bekić began his career as a journalist in 1966 at the age of 20, when he joined the editorial board of the Zagreb newspaper Studentski list. He later moved to another youth weekly magazine Omladinski tjednik. In the period 1969/1970, he was editor-in-chief of "TLO". His career flourished in January 1971, when he was nominated editor-in-chief of the popular Yugoslav illustrated magazine Plavi vjesnik (circulation cca 100,000 copies). However, his mandate lasted less than a year due to his involvement in the Croatian Spring movement in 1971. Bekić was accused of "petty bourgeois and nationalist deviations" and was purged from the League of Communists of Croatia, along with hundreds of other movement members by the president of the League of Communists of Yugoslavia, Marshal Tito. Darko Bekić was removed from the position of editor-in-chief, fired from the Editing House Vjesnik, expelled from the League of Communists and deprived of his passport. According to Nacional, in the aftermath of the Croatian Spring, Darko Bekić was put under Yugoslav secret service UDBA surveillance.

By the end of 1971, Darko Bekić was employed as a research assistant at the Economic Institute in Zagreb. In 1976, he moved to the Institute for Developing Countries, where he continued his career as a research fellow. He led missions to a number of African and Asian countries, serving as a consultant and speaker at numerous congresses and seminars and as an expert member to various national and UN agencies. In the 1984–1986 period he was a post-doctoral Rockefeller Fellow at the Kennan Institute for Advanced Russian Studies of the Woodrow Wilson Center, Washington D.C. At the same time, he served as a guest professor at the Foreign Service Institute in Roslyn, Virginia.

In 1989, he joined the Institute for Contemporary History and renewed his political activity by participating in the establishment of the Croatian Social Liberal Party (HSLS), the first opposition party in Communist Yugoslavia along with Slavko Goldstein, Vlado Gotovac, Zvonko Lerotic, Bozo Kovacevic and others. At the founding convention, on May 20, 1989, he was elected a member of the executive committee. However, Bekic and Lerotic left the party soon after due to internal political disputes with Goldstein. In the summer of 1990, after the first multi-party elections in Croatia, the new, democratically elected President of the Socialist Republic of Croatia, Franjo Tudjman, engaged Bekic as his first Foreign Policy Advisor. In this capacity, he co-authored the proposal for the confederal transformation of Yugoslavia along with Prof. Dr. Vladimir Đuro Degan. This proposal was rejected by the Bush administration as unacceptable. In 1992, he was appointed Ambassador/Permanent Representative of the now independent and internationally recognized Republic of Croatia to the OSCE in Vienna, where he was particularly engaged in the peace negotiations during the 1994 First Chechen War. He was a member of the Croatian delegation in the Bosnia-Herzegowina peace negotiations in 1994. In 1996, he was appointed Ambassador of Croatia to the Organisation of the United Nations in Geneva. In 1998, he was posted as Ambassador to the Republic of Portugal. From 2002 to 2004 he was Assistant Foreign Minister in the Cabinet of Prime Minister Ivica Račan. From 2006 to 2011, he was Ambassador of Croatia to the Kingdom of Morocco. Darko Bekić retired from diplomatic service in 2012 and is currently engaged as a free-lance political analyst, consultant, author and columnist.

== Personal life ==
Darko Bekić is married with four children. He is fluent in Croatian, English and French and has a working knowledge of Italian.

== Books and monographs ==
- Darko Bekić, Razvoj sovjetskog privrednog sustava (Development of the Soviet Economic System) EIZ,1972
- Darko Bekic, Republika Burundi (Republic of Burundi), Rad, Beograd, 1976
- Darko Bekic Svjetsko trziste sirovina, zemlje u razvoju i Jugoslavija (Global Raw-material Market, Developing Countries and Yugoslavia), IZUR, Zagreb,1977
- Darko Bekic, Politicki, ekonomski i vojnostrateski interesi SSSR-a u Africi (Political, Economic and Strategic Interests of the Soviet Union in Africa), IZUR, Zagreb, 1982
- Darko Bekić, Jugoslavija u hladnom ratu. Odnosi s velikim silama 1949–1955 (Yugoslavia in the Cold War. Relations with Big Powers 1949–1955), Globus, Zagreb, 1988
- Darko Bekić, Vojin Bakić. Biografija; kratka povijest Kiposlavije (Vojin Bakic, A Biography. Short History of Monumentoslavia), Profil, Zagreb, 2006
- Darko Bekić, Povijest hrvatske diplomacije (History of Croatian Diplomacy) Vol.1, Školska Knjiga, Zagreb, 2016

=== Articles and studies ===
- Darko Bekic et al., Sigurnost malih i srednjih drzava (Security of small and medium-sized countries), in dr.Darko Bekic ur., Sigurnost malih i srednjih država, IZUR, Zagreb, 1982
- Darko Bekic, "Kriza višenacionalnih zemalja u razvoju; politekonomski aspekti"(The Crisis of Multiethnical Developing Countries; Political-Economic Aspects), in J. Jelic, ed., Antikolonijalna revolucija, socijalna ekonomska i politicka emancipacija (Anti-Colonial Revolution, Social, Economic and Political Emancipation), ICD/ICSF, Zagreb,1984
- Darko Bekic, "Etnicki i vjerski sukobi-izvor politicke nestabilnosti (Ethnical and Religious Conflicts - Source of Instability), in D. Vulovic, S. Stefanovic, eds., Mediteran 80-ih (Mediterranean in the 80s), Grupa izdavaca, Beograd,1984., pp. 123–162.
- Darko Bekić, "Eguaglianza economica e indipendenza politica come promesse di stabilita" (Economic Equality and Political Independence As Guarantees of Stability), in Politica Internazionale, Vol.XII, No.2/Febbraio 1984, pp.5-9.
- Darko Bekic, "Albania`s Gorbachev?", in Washington Post (Washington, D.C.),14 April 1985, p.B7.
- Darko Bekic, "Soviet Goals in Yugoslavia and the Balkans", in John D. Stremlau, ed., Soviet Policy in an Uncertain World, in The Annals of the American Academy of Political and Social Science, Beverly Hills, Ca, September 1985, pp. 81–91.
- Darko Bekic, "Yugoslav System in Crisis: Internal Views", in Problems of Communism, Washington, D.C., November–December 1985, Vol. XXXIV, pp. 70–78
- Darko Bekic, "Political Education in a Communist Country; A Critical Retrospective", in Ki-Shik, S.J. Hahn, eds., The Political Education for Democracies, Korean Research Institute for Moral and Political Education, Seoul, 1990, pp. 105–146.
- Darko Bekic, The Role of the CSCE in the Management of the War on the Territories of Former Yugoslavia, u KSZE; in Die Entwicklung von Rüstungskontrole und Abrüstung... (Proceedings), Europaische Akademie, Wien/Karl Theodor Molinary-Stiftung, e. v. Bonn, 1992
- Darko Bekic, The Beginning of the Colonial Expansion of the Dubrovnik Republic in the 16th Century: The Saint Blaise Colony in Portuguese Goa in India, in Diplomacy of the Republic of Dubrovnik (Proceedings), Diplomatic Academy of the MFARC, Zagreb,1998, pp. 45–153.
- Darko Bekić, "Diplomacija u fazi globalizacije:izvoz kapitala ili/i izvoz demokracije ?"(Diplomacy in the Age of Globalisation: Export of Capital or Export of Democracy ?), in Zbornik Diplomatske akademije, Simpozij "Iskustva moderne hrvatske diplomacije" (Diplomatic Academy Yearbook, Symposium "Experiences of the Modern Croatian Diplomacy"), Diplomatska akademija MVP, Zagreb, 1999, pp. 99–104.
- Darko Bekić, "Political Culture in Theory and Practice of Diplomacy", in Diplomatic Academy Yearbook, International Conference "The Role od Diplomacy in Countries in Transition With Special Emphasis on Education and Training", Dubrovnik, Croatia, October 1–2, 1998, MFA RC/DA, Zagreb, 1999, pp. 47–53
- Darko Bekić, "Neke razlike i sličnosti između normalizacije francusko-njemačkih i hrvatsko-srpskih odnosa u procesu europske integracije, kao i aktualnog proširenja Europske Unije" (Some Differences and Similarities Between Normalisation of Franco-German and Croatian-Serbian Relations In the Process of European Integration and the Ongoing Enlargement of the EU), Međunarodni znanstveni kolokvij "Poslijeratni francusko-njemački odnosi i europsko približavanje", 19.svibnja 2003 (International Scientific Colloquium "Post-WW2 Franco-German Relations and the European Rapprochement"), Katedra za svjetsku povijest FF/Centar za suvremenu hrvatsku povijest/Veleposlanstvo RF i SRNJ u Zagrebu, May 19, 2003
- Darko Bekic, The Balkan Pact: The Still-Born of the Cold War, in E. Klein, J. Gibianskii, R. Preussen, eds., Yugoslavia in the Cold War (Proceedings), University of Toronto/ INZG, Ljubljana, 2004.
- Darko Bekic, Public Diplomacy and Branding of a Nation; the Case of Croatia, in M.Andrlić, ed., Cultural Promotion and Diplomacy, Dubrovnik, Croatia, October 14–15, 2005, Diplomatic Academy Proceedings, Ministry of Foreign Affairs and European Integration, Republic of Croatia, Zagreb, 2009., pp. 61–68.
- Darko Bekic, Prilog poznavanju diplomatskih odnosa Dubrovnika i Marokanskog sultanata u posljednjim desetljecima Republike (Contribution to the knowledge of diplomatic relations between Dubrovnik and the Moroccan Sultanate in the last decades of the Republic, The Mediterranean Memory Project, Dubrovnik Consulates, Dubrovnik, October 15–17, 2010., p. 9.
- Darko Bekic, Future Scenarios for SEE after 2013, The Friedrich Ebert-Stiftung Dubrovnik Dialogue 2012: "Southeast Europe after 2013: Future Scenarios for a Problematic Region and the Role of Parliaments“, Cavtat, October 5–7, 2012., pp. 24.
- Darko Bekić, "O državnim, dinastičkim, političkim i diplomatskim vezama Hrvatske i Poljske od 14. do 16.stoljeća" (On State, Dynastic, Political and Diplomatic Ties Between Croatia and Poland From 14th to 16th Century), simpozij "Poljsko-hrvatske veze kroz stoljeća. Povijest, kultura, književnost", Institut slavenske filologije Jagiellonskog sveučilišta u Krakowu, 8-9 lipnja 2016 (Symposium "Centennial Polish-Croatian Ties. History, Culture, Literature", Institute for Slavic filology, Jagellonian University in Krakow), 8–9 June 2016

== Decorations ==
- Official Commemorative Medal for the service to Developing countries, by the UNVP (OUN), 1978
- Commemorative Medal for the participation in the Homeland War 1990–1992 (Republic of Croatia), 1993
- Order of Duke Branimir with Ribbon for the service to the State of Croatia (Republic of Croatia), 1995
- Alaouite Grand Officer Ouissam (Kingdom of Morocco), 2011
