= Andrea Bekić =

Croatian diplomat

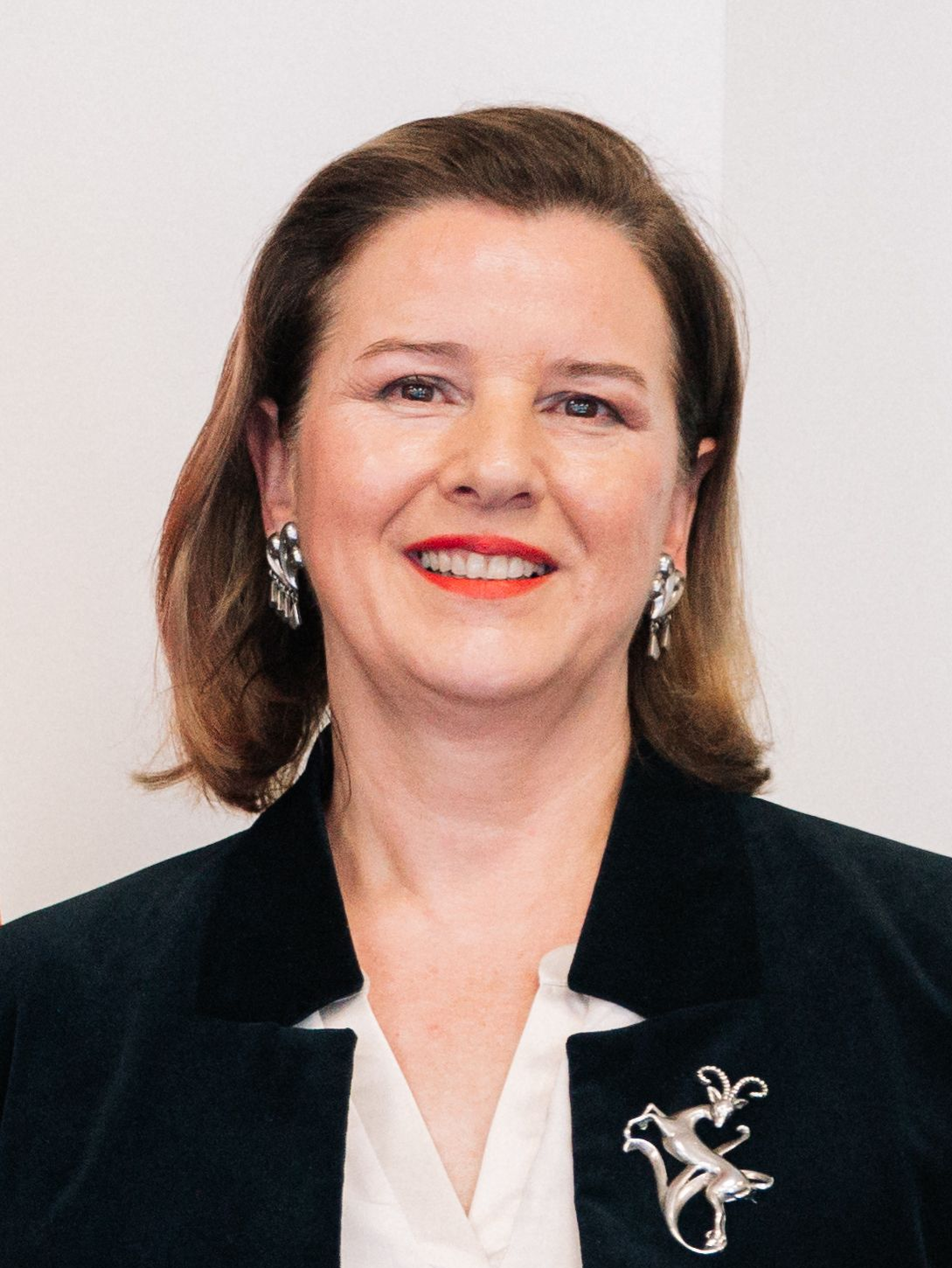
- Andrea Bekić in 2024

Croatian Ambassador to Switzerland
- In office 2018–Present
- Preceded by: Aleksandar Heina

Croatian Ambassador to Poland
- In office 2013–2018
- Preceded by: Ivan del Vecchio

Personal details
- Born: May 14, 1965 (age 61) Zagreb, Yugoslavia (now Croatia)
- Spouse: Darko Bekić
- Children: 2
- Education: University of Zagreb

Andrea Bekić (born May 14, 1965) is a Croatian diplomat, current Ambassador Extraordinary and Plenipotentiary to The Swiss Confederation. Formerly, she was Croatian Ambassador to The Republic of Poland.

== Early life and education ==
Andrea Bekić was born on May 14, 1965, in Zagreb, Croatia. She was educated in Zagreb, where she earned her BA (Bachelor of Arts) in English and French language and literature, at the Faculty of Humanities and Social Sciences of the University of Zagreb (1993). Later on, in 2009, Andrea Bekic obtained her MA in Political Science/International Relations, followed by a PhD degree in Political Science/International Relations at the Faculty of Political Science of the University of Zagreb (2012). Andrea Bekic continued her specialisation by attending the MVEP/Ecole Nationale d'Administration (ENA) seminar on the preparation of the Croatian administration for the accession to the EU (2011) as well as completing the High Level Course on EU Common Foreign and Security Policy at the European Security and Defence College (2013)

== Career ==
Andrea Bekic began her career as a Liaison-officer and interpreter for the European Community Monitoring Mission in Croatia and Former Yugoslavia (1991). In March 1992, she entered the Ministry of Foreign Affairs as an Assistant in the Office of Minister Zvonimir Šeparović. Afterwards, she was Second Secretary and advisor to the spokesperson of the Foreign Ministry (1992–1995).

Andrea Bekic continued her diplomatic career as a First Secretary in the Embassy of Croatia in Portugal (1998–2002). Later on, she was counsellor in the North America Department of the Ministry of Foreign Affairs (2002–2004). As the Head of the North American Department, in the 2003–2006 period, she was involved in negotiating SOFA with the US and shaping Croatian policies for NATO membership.

In 2011, Andrea Bekic was nominated senior diplomat in the Department for EU institutions, and Senior diplomat in the Department for Common Foreign and Security Policy (CFSP) and Common Security and Defence Policy (CSDP). As the Head of the Missions and Operations Department, Andrea Bekic represented Croatia in various EU fora and at the Steering Committee of the European Security and Defence College (2012–2013). She also coordinated Croatia’s projects in the Task Force for Tunisia within the Community of Democracies (2012–2013).

In 2013, Andrea Bekic was appointed Ambassador Extraordinary and Plenipotentiary of the Republic of Croatia to the Republic of Poland. In 2018, she was appointed Ambassador to The Swiss Confederation.

== Personal life ==
Andrea Bekić is married to Dr. Darko Bekić, a retired Ambassador and a historian of diplomacy. She is the mother of two sons.

She is fluent in Croatian, English and French and has a working knowledge of Polish, Italian, Portuguese, Spanish and German.

== Publications ==
Andrea Bekić, Review of Economic and Social Development of Portugal Before and After Joining EC, Ministry of Foreign Affairs/Diplomatic Academy, Zagreb, March 2004. (Prikaz gospodarskog i društvenog razvoja Portugala prije i nakon ulaska u EZ, Ministarstvo vanjskih poslova RH/Diplomatska akademija, Savjetnički rad, ožujak, 2004.)

Andrea Bekic, Perception of the establishment of Republic of Croatia in key political capitals:Washington, Bonn, London, Bruxelles Moscow 1990–1992 (MA Thesis), Zagreb, 2009. (Percepcija uspostave Republike Hrvatske u političkim metropolama 1990.-1992.: Washington, Bonn, London, Bruxelles, Moskva, Magistarski rad, Zagreb, 2009.)

Andrea Bekic, Continuity of US Policy towards the Republic of Croatia from the First Multiparty Elections to International Recognition,1990–1992, International Studies, Vol.10, No.2, 2010., pp. 12–38 (Kontinuitet politike SAD-a prema uspostavi Republike Hrvatske od prvih višestranačkih izbora do međunarodnog priznanja1990-1992, Međunarodne studije, God.10, br.2/2010., pp. 12–38.)

Andrea Bekic, London and Bonn - Two Poles of the European Community's Policy Concerning the Recognition of the Republic of Croatia in 1991, Journal of Contemporary History, Zagreb, No.2, 2010, pp. 339–366 (London i Bonn - dva pola politike Europske zajednice prema priznanju Republike Hrvatske 1991.godine, Časopis za suvremenu povijest, br.2, 2010, str.339-366).

Andrea Bekic, The Influence of Small Member States on Framing or Defining and Implementing the Common Foreign and Security Policy of the European Union (PhD Thesis), Zagreb, 2012.(Utjecaj malih zemalja članica na oblikovanje ili osmišljavanje i provođenje zajedničke vanjske i sigurnosne poltike Europske Unije, Doktorski rad, Zagreb,2012.)

Andrea Bekic, Preface by the Ambassador of Croatia, in E.Pralat, Giants in Seamless (...) Cultural Links Between Greater Poland and Croatia in the 19th Century, Poznan-Lodz,2014.(Wielcy w niepozornym...Stosunki kulturalne miedzy Wielkopolska a Chorwacja w XIX wieku, Poznan-Lodz,2014)

Andrea Bekic, "Slovenian Blockade of the Accession Negotiations Between the Republic of Croatia and the EU", in J.Vujić, M.Nakić, red., Croatian Membership in the EU; Challenges and Perspectives (Proceedings), Croatian Diplomatic Association, Zagreb, 2015. ("Slovenska blokada pristupnih pregovora Republike Hrvatske Europskoj Uniji, 2007.-2009.", u J.Vujić, M.Nakić, ur., Hrvatsko članstvo u EU: izazovi i perspektive, Zbornik radova, Udruga hrvatskih diplomata, Zagreb 2015.)

Andrea Bekić, "Croatia was not a «willing executioner» in the Holocaust", Neue Zürcher Zeitung, 19.12.2018 ("Kroatien war kein «williger Helfer» im Holocaust", Neue Zürcher Zeitung, 19.12.2018.)

== Decorations ==
- Commander's Cross with Star of the Order of Merit of the Republic of Poland
