= Bulgarian Red Cross =

Humanitarian aid organization in Bulgaria

- Български Червен кръст
- Formation: 1885; 141 years ago
- Purpose: Humanitarian Aid
- Headquarters: Sofia, Bulgaria
- Region served: Bulgaria
- President: Hristo Grigorov
- Revenue: 9,100,000 CHF (2016)
- Staff: 518 (2016)
- Volunteers: 17,582 (2016)
- Website: www.redcross.bg

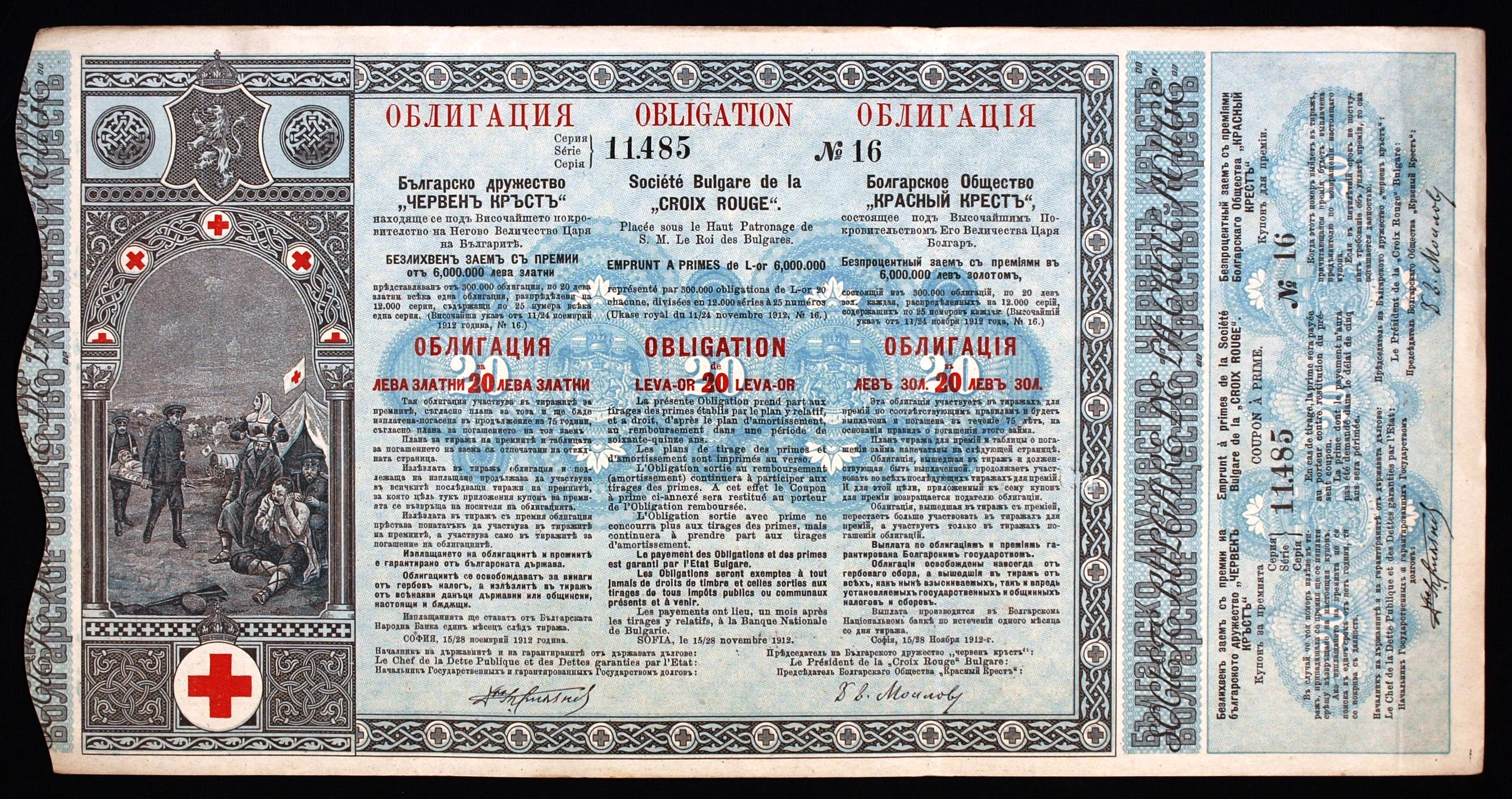
Bond of the Bulgarian Red Cross, issued 28 November 1912

The Bulgarian Red Cross, or BRC (Bulgarian: Български Червен кръст, romanized: Bŭlgarski Cherven krŭst) was established in 1878 after the liberation of the Principality of Bulgaria and the region of Eastern Rumelia from the Ottoman Empire. The first BRC organization was established in May 1878 in Sofia. The regional governor, V.P. Alabin, recruited many prominent citizens of the city, and led their work in the first BRC. The two Bulgarian provinces, Principality of Bulgaria and Eastern Rumelia, became unified on September 20, 1885. The National Organization of the BRC was then founded, with the approval of the statues of the organization by the first Bulgarian Prince, Prince Alexander of Battenberg. On October 20, 1885, the BRC was recognized by, and became a member of the International Committee of the Red Cross (ICRC). Significant contributions made by Tsar Boris III during the period of 1918–1943, which provided the organization with the ability to establish itself, and to take the first steps towards creating a Bulgarian social health system.

The headquarters of the BRC is located in Sofia, Bulgaria. The branches of the BRC are located in: Blagoevgrad, Burgas, Varna, Veliko Tarnovo, Vidin, Vratsa, Gabrovo, Dobrich, Kardjali, Kyustendil, Lovech, Montana, Pazardzhik, Pernik, Pleven, Plovdiv, Razgrad, Russe, Silistra, Sliven, Smolyan, Sofia, Stara Zagora, Targovishte, Haskovo, Shumen, and Yambol.
