= Joanna Trafiałek =

Polish food technologist

- Citizenship: Polish
- Education: Warsaw University of Life Sciences
- Occupations: food technologist and human nutrition

Joanna Trafiałek is a Polish food technologist and human nutrition specialist, professor of agricultural sciences, and professor at the Warsaw University of Life Sciences (SGGW). Her research focuses on human nutrition and the health safety of food products.

== Biography ==
In 1996, she graduated in food technology and human nutrition from the Warsaw University of Life Sciences. In 2008, she defended her doctoral dissertation at the Faculty of Human Nutrition and Consumer Sciences of SGGW, entitled Ocena stopnia wdrożenia systemu zapewnienia bezpieczeństwa zdrowotnego w produkcji żywności w Polsce, supervised by Danuta Kołożyn-Krajewska. In 2017, she obtained her habilitation at the same faculty based on the thesis Studia nad systemowym zapewnieniem bezpieczeństwa żywności. In 2023, the Council of Scientific Excellence initiated the professorial procedure for Joanna Trafałek. On May 15, 2024, after the application was positively considered by the President of the Republic of Poland, she was awarded the title of Professor of Agricultural sciences.
