= Mościcki =

Mościcki may refer to:

- Ignacy Mościcki (1867–1946), Polish chemist, politician, and President of Poland (1926–1939)
- Henryka Mościcka-Dendys (born 1976), Polish diplomat, legal scholar
- Jan Mościcki (1988), Polish ice dancer, partner of Joanna Budner
