= Hanna Kowalska =

- Citizenship: Polish
- Education: Warsaw University of Life Sciences
- Occupations: food technologist and human nutrition

Hanna Kowalska is a Polish food and nutrition technologist, a Professor of agricultural sciences, and a professor at the Warsaw University of Life Sciences (SGGW).

== Życiorys ==
In 1987, she graduated from the Warsaw University of Life Sciences (SGGW) with a degree in food technology. In 2002, she defended her doctoral dissertation entitled Badanie procesu odwadniania osmotycznego wybranych owoców i warzyw (Study of the osmotic dehydration process of selected fruits and vegetables), supervised by Prof. Andrzej Lenart. In 2013, she obtained her habilitation based on the thesis entitled Wybrane aspekty odwadniania osmotycznego jabłek w roztworze sacharozy z dodatkiem kwasu askorbinowego i soli wapnia. In 2022, the Council of Scientific Excellence initiated the professorial procedure for Hanna Kowalska. On September 7, 2023, after the application was positively considered by the President of the Republic of Poland, she was awarded the title of Professor of Agricultural sciences.

She was employed as an Assistant Professor in the Department of Food Engineering and Production Organisation at the Faculty of Food Sciences of the Warsaw University of Life Sciences (SGGW). She was later promoted to the position of University Professor in the Institute of Food Sciences at SGGW.
