= Embassy of Poland, Copenhagen =

Ambasada Rzeczypospolitej Polskiej w Kopenhadze Embassy of the Republic of Poland in Copenhagen

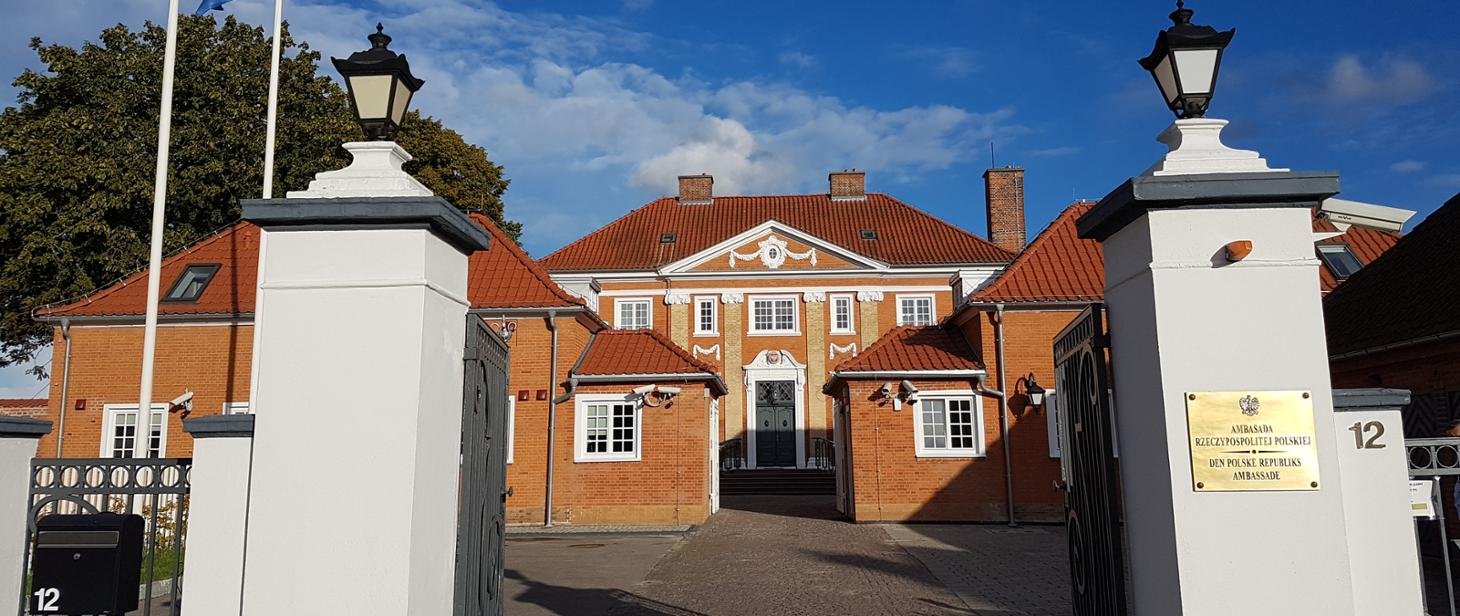
- Location: Richelieus Alle, Hellerup, Denmark
- Address: Richelieus Alle 12, 2900 Hellerup
- Coordinates: 55.7381°N 12.5832°E
- Ambassador: Ewa Dębska (Chargé d’affaires)

The Polish Embassy in Copenhagen is the diplomatic mission of the Republic of Poland to the Kingdom of Denmark. The chancery is located at Richelieus Alle 12, Hellerup, Copenhagen.

== Building ==
The embassy is housed within a rococo style building on the banks of the Øresund sound. The main chancery building is adjoined by the ambassador's residence which is also of a rococo architectural style and the embassy's consular complex which was designed in a neo-classical style with elements of Danish baroque architecture such as the tented roof.

== See also ==
- Denmark–Poland relations
- List of ambassadors of Poland to Denmark
- List of diplomatic missions of Poland
- Foreign relations of Poland
