= Jan Górecki =

Polish economist (1934–2025)

Jan Górecki (18 August 1934 – 6 July 2025) was a Polish economist, academic, rector of the Warsaw University of Life Sciences and diplomat.

== Life and career ==
Górecki was born on 18 August 1934. He graduated in 1956 from the Faculty of Economics and Agriculture of the Warsaw University of Life Sciences. He then started working at the Department of Economics and Organization of Agricultural Farms at the university.

In 1974, he was awarded the Commander's Cross of the First Class of the Badge of Honour for Merit to the Republic of Austria.

From 1974 to 1979, he worked as an expert at the Food and Agriculture Secretariat of the United Nations (FAO) in Rome. In 1982, he was appointed a member of the Organizing Committee and the Negotiation Team of the Church Agricultural Foundation. In the years 1991–1995, he was the chairman of the Council for Rural Affairs and Agriculture at the Chancellery of President Lech Wałęsa, then he was a member of the council at the Chancellery of President Lech Kaczyński. In 1997–2001, he was the Polish ambassador to Denmark.

Górecki died on 6 July 2025, at the age of 90.
