= List of ambassadors of Poland to Denmark =

Poland Ambassador to Denmark
- Ambasador Rzeczypospolitej Polskiej w Danii
- Coat of arms of Poland

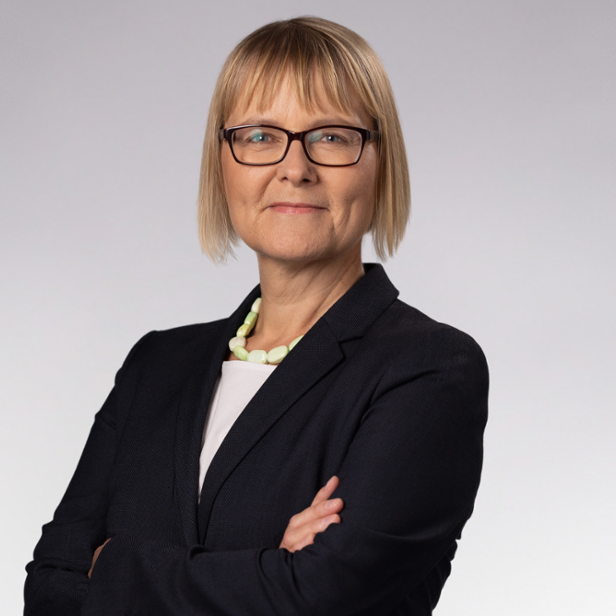
- Incumbent; Ewa Dębska (chargé d’affaires) since 4 October 2024
- Style: Mr. Ambassador (informal); His Excellency (diplomatic)
- Reports to: Polish Ministry of Foreign Affairs
- Seat: Copenhagen, Denmark
- Appointer: President of Poland
- Term length: No fixed term
- Website: Embassy of Poland, Denmark

The Republic of Poland Ambassador to Denmark is the Poland's foremost diplomatic representative in Denmark, and head of the Poland's diplomatic mission in Denmark. He is Poland's highest diplomatic representative to the Queen and the Government of the Kingdom of Denmark.

As with all Poland Ambassadors, the ambassador to Denmark is nominated by the President of Poland and confirmed by the Parliamentary Commission of the Foreign Affairs. The ambassador serves at the pleasure of the President, and enjoys full diplomatic immunity.

Poland Embassy in Denmark is located in Copenhagen.

== List of ambassadors of Poland to Denmark ==
=== Second Polish Republic ===
- 1919–1924: Aleksander Maria Dzieduszycki (envoy)
- 1924: Kazimierz Papée (chargé d’affaires)
- 1924–1928: Konstanty Rozwadowski (envoy)
- 1928–1931: Zygmunt Michałowski (envoy)
- 1936–1936: Michał Sokolnicki (envoy)
- 1936–1940: Jan Starzewski (envoy)

April 5, 1940 – close-down of the embassy due to the German Occupation of Denmark

=== People's Polish Republic ===
- 1945–1946: Piotr Szamański (chargé d’affaires)
- 1946–1954: Stanisław Kelles-Krauz (envoy)
- 1954–1957: Józef Dryblas (envoy)
- 1957–1963: Stanisław Dobrowolski
- 1963–1968: Romuald Poleszczuk
- 1968–1973: Henryk Wendrowski
- 1973–1978: Stanisław Pichla
- 1978–1981: Bohdan Trąmpczyński
- 1981–1984: Tadeusz Wujek
- 1984–1989: Lucjan Piątkowski

=== Third Polish Republic ===
- 1989–1991: Janusz Roszkowski
- 1991–1997: Jerzy Sito
- 1997–2001: Jan Górecki
- 2001–2005: Barbara Tuge-Erecińska
- 2005–2006: Jakub Wolski
- 2006–2010: Adam Halamski
- 2010–2015: Rafał Wiśniewski
- 2015–2020: Henryka Mościcka-Dendys
- 2020–2022: Mateusz Mońko (chargé d’affaires a.i.)
- 2022–2024: Antoni Fałkowski
- since 2024: Ewa Dębska (chargé d’affaires a.i.)
