= Monika Michaliszyn =

Polish diplomat (born 1974)

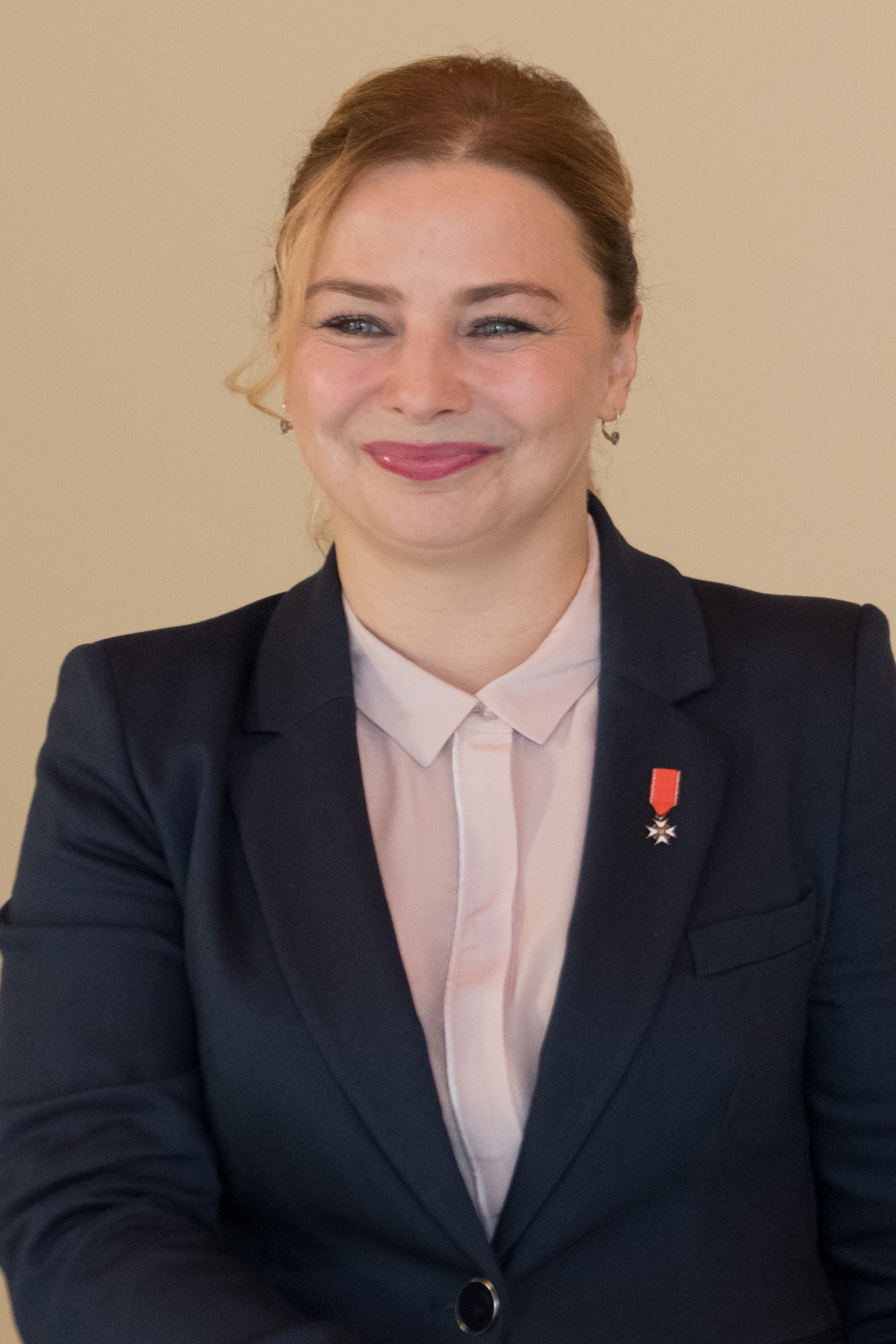

Poland Ambassador to Latvia
- In office 2 September 2018 – 31 May 2024
- Appointed by: Andrzej Duda
- President: Raimonds Vējonis; Egils Levits
- Preceded by: Ewa Dębska
- Succeeded by: Tomasz Szeratics

Personal details
- Born: 22 May 1974 (age 52)
- Education: Adam Mickiewicz University in Poznań
- Profession: Philologist, translator, diplomat

Monika Iwona Michaliszyn (born 22 May 1974) is a Polish philologist, translator and diplomat, between 2018 and 2024 serving as a Poland ambassador to Latvia.

== Life ==
=== Education ===
Monika Michaliszyn has graduated from Polish and Latvian studies at the Adam Mickiewicz University in Poznań. In 2003 she defended her Ph.D. thesis on names of colours in Polish and Latvian languages. Next year she became certified Latvian language translator.

Apart from Polish and Latvian, she speaks English, German and Russian languages.

=== Career ===
Between 1998 and 2003 she has been Head of Latvian-Polish Cultural Relationships unit at the Latvian Academy of Culture in Riga. From 2002 to 2003 she was also working as translator for the Polish embassy there.

In 2003 she moved to Poland where she started working for the University of Warsaw as an adiunkt. In 2013 she became the Head of the Polish-Baltic Cultural Relationships Unit, and, in 2015, coordinator of the University of Warsaw cooperation with the Baltic States. Her research focuses on Baltic states, especially Latvian history, culture and relations with Poland.

Between 2006 and 2007 she has been the main adviser of the Head of the Foreign Affairs Committee of the Polish Parliament. In 2007 she was Prime Minister envoy responsible for the cooperation with the Baltic states. In 2013 she became member of the Baltic Advisory Team to the Minister of Foreign Affairs.

Since 2006 she is the president of the Polish-Baltic Society (Towarzystwo Polsko-Bałtyckie).

She has been publishing on Latvia in Polish media, e.g. Polityka weekly and Dziennik Polska-Europa-Świat daily.

Between 2 September 2018 and 31 May 2024 she served as the ambassador to Latvia.

== Honours ==
- Cross of Recognition, Latvia (2012)
