= Antoni Fałkowski =

Polish official

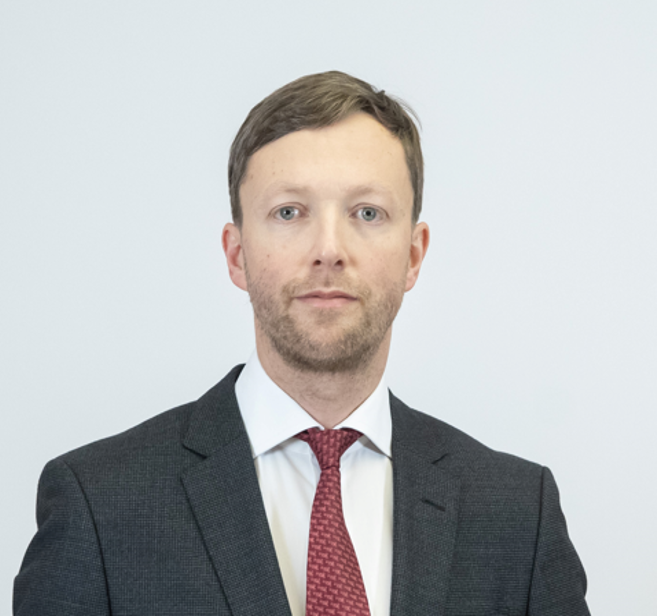
- Antoni Fałkowski (2022)

Poland Ambassador to Denmark
- In office 25 March 2022 – July 2024
- Appointed by: Andrzej Duda
- Monarch: Margrethe II
- Preceded by: Henryka Mościcka-Dendys

Personal details
- Spouse: Wiktoria Bernadetta Fałkowska
- Children: 3 children
- Education: University of Warsaw
- Profession: official

Antoni Jan Fałkowski is a Polish official who served as ambassador of Poland to Denmark (2022–2024).

== Life ==
Antoni Fałkowski graduated from the Faculty of Management of the University of Warsaw. He was studying also at the University of Marburg.

He was working in the United Kingdom as a consultant. Next, he joined the Ministry of Economy of Poland where he worked as an energy specialist responsible for European Union regulations. He worked also for the state-owned energy companies. Between 2007 and 2011 he was head of the Trade and Investment Promotion Section of the Embassy in Oslo, Norway, where he was covering, among others, construction of the natural gas pipeline connecting Norway and Poland. For the next two years, he worked at the Ministry of Environment of Poland, being in charge of creating legal regulations for shale gas exploration. He worked for three tears for PKN Orlen, PGNiG (as head of LNG section).

On 30 November 2021 he was appointed ambassador to Denmark. He took the post on 25 March 2022. On 6 May 2022, he presented his letter of credence. He ended his mission in July 2024.

He is married to Wiktoria Bernadetta Fałkowska with three sons.
