= Denmark–Poland relations =

Bilateral relations of Denmark and Poland

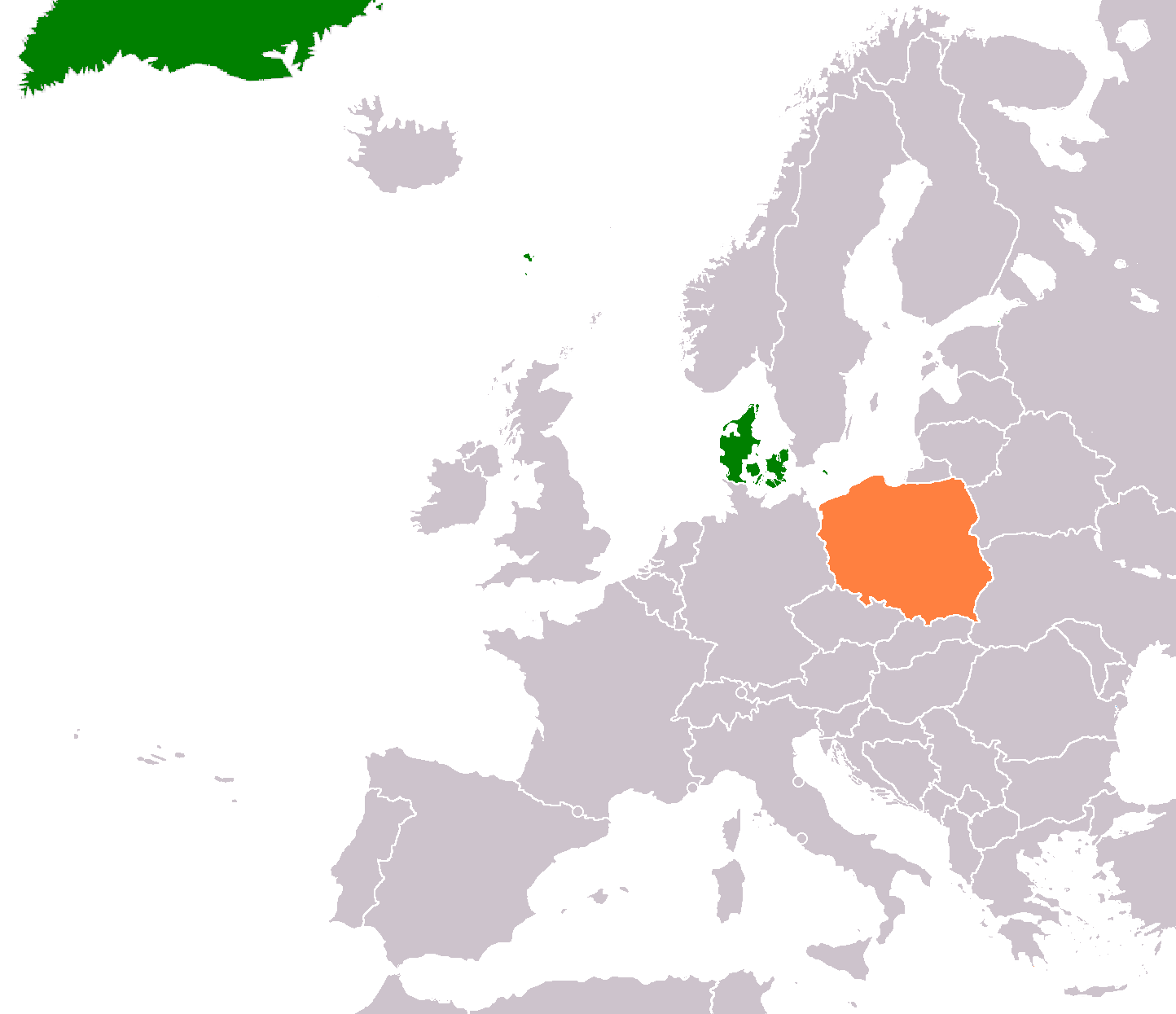
- Denmark: Poland

Denmark and Poland are separated by the Baltic Sea, and have had a very long historical contact. Both countries are full members of the Council of Europe, European Union, NATO, and the Council of the Baltic Sea States.

Relations date back to the Early Middle Ages. Throughout history, the two nations were more often allies than adversaries, with only a handful of clashes in the 11th, 15th and 16th centuries. Modern diplomatic relations were established on 8 September 1919. During the 20th century, relations were turbulent but amicable. The two countries moreover maintained a maritime border dispute until 2018 when it was delineated. Denmark and Poland are now strategic partners due to the Baltic Pipe and close military cooperation within the Multinational Corps Northeast of NATO.

== History ==
=== Medieval period ===
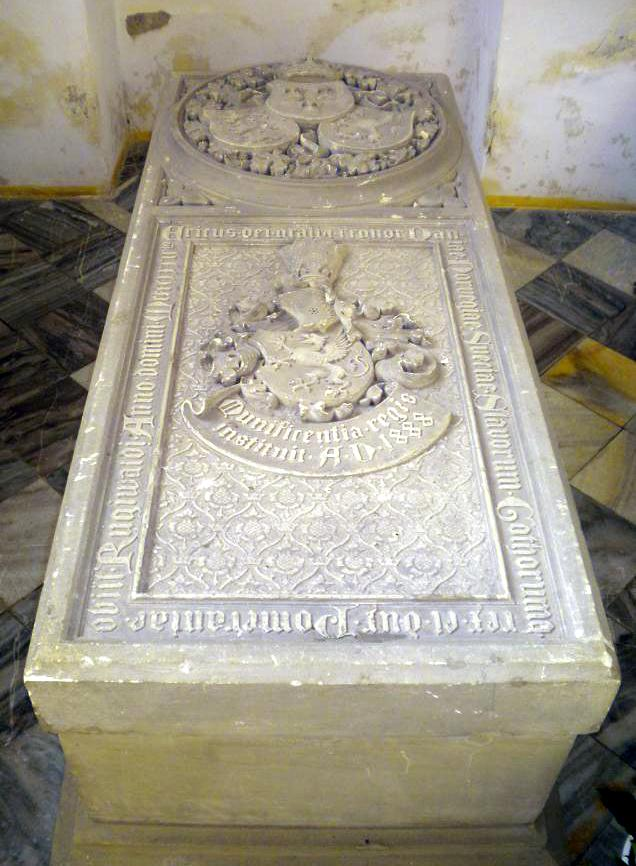
Tomb of King Eric VII of Denmark in Darłowo, Poland

Danish-Polish relations date back to the Middle Ages, with both countries adopting Christianity around 965–966 and thus joining the Western civilization. By 967 the emerging Polish state gained access to the Baltic Sea by obtaining Pomerania with Wolin, the largest Baltic port city at the time, stirring animosity of Denmark, which pursued a policy of conquest in the Baltic and feared the emergence of a potential major rival, thus invaded Wolin several times in the 11th century. Afterwards, in the medieval period, Poland and Denmark entered into alliances several times, including in the 1120s, 1315, 1350, 1363 and 1419. As a result of the expansion of Poland and Denmark, their spheres of influence bordered since c. 1130, when the Rugia island and Hither Pomerania passed under Polish suzerainty, and the Obotrites came under Danish sphere of influence. In 1320 Denmark also was allied with the duchies of Pomerania and Jawor, both formed in the course of the medieval fragmentation of Poland, in their war against the duchies of Mecklenburg and Saxe-Wittenberg, with Duke Henry I of Jawor visiting King Christopher II of Denmark at Vordingborg. In the medieval period, Poland and Denmark had vivid trade relations.

From 1396 to 1439, Eric of Pomerania of the House of Griffin was King of Denmark as Eric VII, and his tomb is located in his birth town of Darłowo in Poland. In 1423, Duke Henry X Rumpold from the Głogów line of the Polish Piast dynasty served as a mediator in a dispute between King Eric VII of Denmark and Henry IV, Count of Holstein-Rendsburg. He suddenly died of an unknown disease in Slesvig in 1423 and was buried in Haderslev, making it the northernmost burial place of a Polish ruler.

During the Polish-Teutonic wars of 1409–1411 and 1454–1466, Denmark temporarily sided with the Teutonic Knights, however, there were very few Danish-Polish clashes, and a truce between Poland and Denmark was signed in 1458.

=== Modern period ===
In 1516, Denmark and Poland signed an alliance and a trade agreement.

Denmark and Poland were initially allies in the Northern Seven Years' War since 1563, although eventually, a conflict arose over shipping through the port of Narva, and, in 1568, Poland formed an alliance with Sweden and afterwards helped conclude the Danish-Swedish peace at Szczecin in 1570.

The deterioration of Dano-Polish relations resulted in a Danish naval raid on Hel in Poland in 1571. King Frederick II of Denmark sought sole supremacy in the Baltic Sea, thus he attempted to hinder the growth of Poland as a maritime power and supported the rebellion of the bourgeoisie of Gdańsk, the largest port city of Poland, against Polish King Stephen Báthory and entered into talks to take Gdańsk under Danish suzerainty. Polish King Stephen Báthory still offered privileged terms to Denmark regarding trade in the Baltic Sea in an effort to make a new Dano-Polish alliance possible. Exaggerated rumours of an allegedly detailed plan to divide Denmark between Sweden and Spain with the participation of Poland and the forcible re-introduction of Catholicism in Denmark spread across Europe, causing concern in Protestant countries, even though Polish-Swedish talks of a potential new alliance had barely begun. In 1579, Frederick II of Denmark offered Poland an alliance against Russia, which, however, in view of the conflict of interests, was not concluded, but Danish-Polish relations remained good afterwards with the Danish Navy blocking Russian trade through the Baltic Sea.

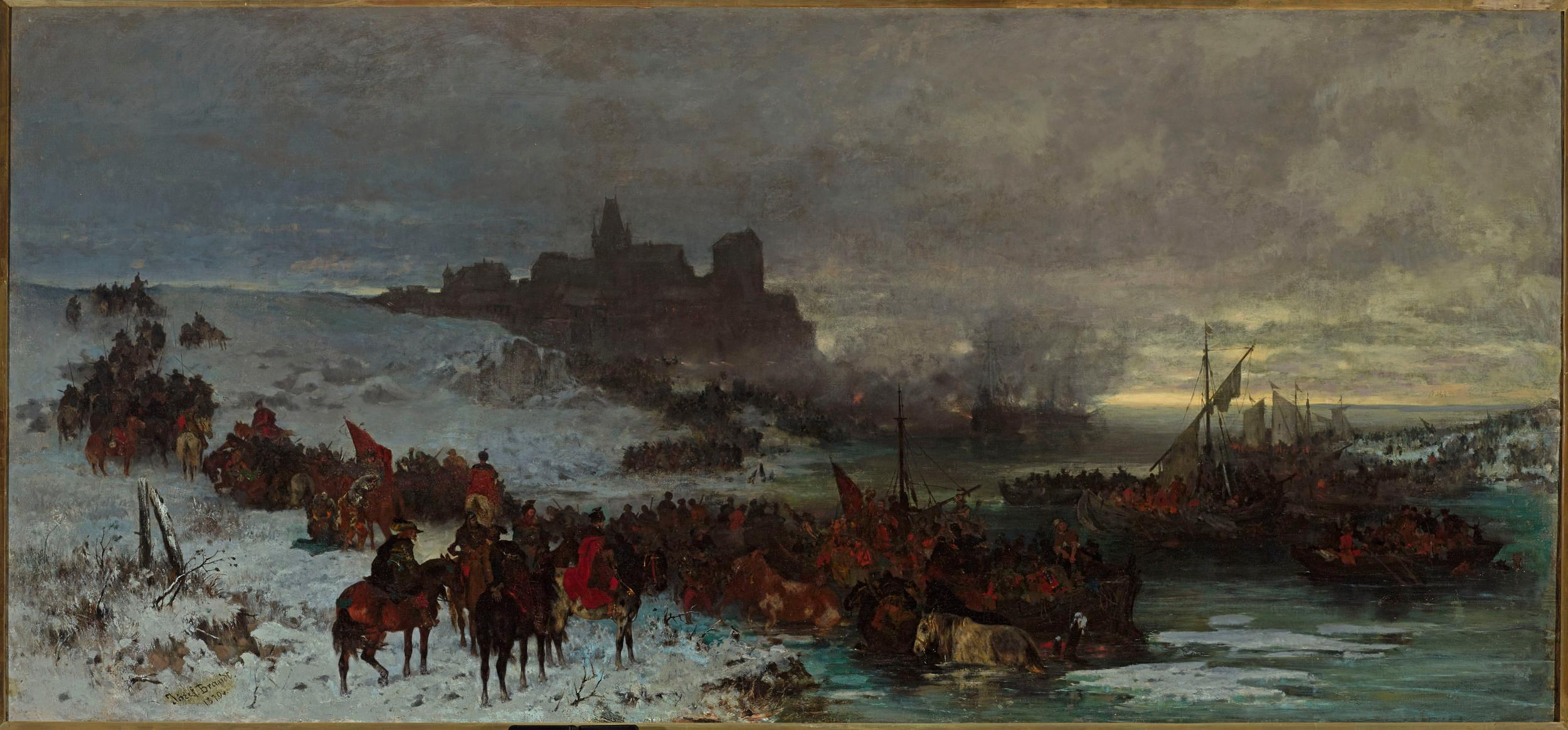
Siege of Kolding (1658) by allied Polish and Danish forces against the Swedish occupiers on a 19th-century painting by Józef Brandt; National Museum in Warsaw

Denmark and Poland were allies against Sweden again during the Northern War of 1655–1660, with Swedes invading both countries, and the Poles helping to drive Swedish occupiers out of Denmark.

Prince George of Denmark was a candidate in the 1674 Polish–Lithuanian royal election.

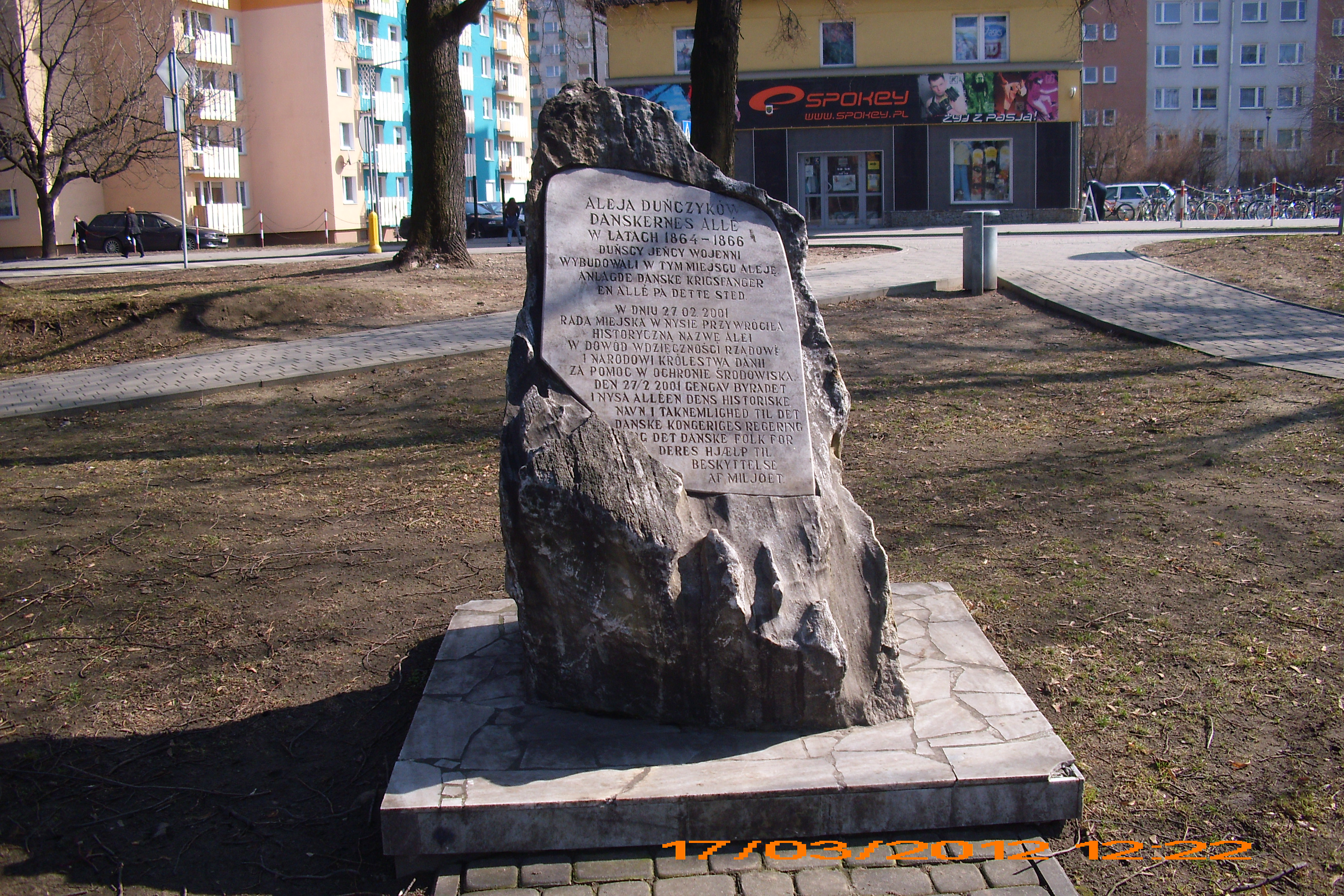
Memorial stone at Aleja Duńczyków (Avenue of the Danes) in Nysa, Poland

Denmark supported the Polish national uprisings when the Polish–Lithuanian Commonwealth fell in 1795. In Nysa, Poland, there is a road called Aleja Duńczyków (Avenue of the Danes), built in 1864–1866 by Danish soldiers taken prisoner by Prussia in the Second Schleswig War. There is a memorial stone at the site.

By 1904, there was a Polish community consisting of several thousand workers scattered throughout Denmark. Polak w Danii ("Pole in Denmark"), the oldest Polish newspaper in Denmark, was first published in July 1918, several months before Poland regained independence.

=== Interwar period ===
Modern relations stem back to the Interwar period. Contacts between Denmark and the new Second Polish Republic began in the first weeks after independence, when Poland asked Denmark to care for Poles in Germany and Russia. On 30 May 1919, Denmark decided to recognize the independence of Poland and diplomatic relations were ultimately established on 8 September 1919. The Polish legation was established in the Hotel Phoenix Copenhagen in 1919 with Aleksander Dzieduszycki as the first representative. In the following months, the Danish legation in Warsaw would send reports back on Polish border conflicts, war with Russia and domestic problems, while the territorial ambitions of the new county were met with caution. Before the Locarno conference in 1925, mainstream Polish media called for Poland and Denmark to cooperate so that both countries could be included in the defense pact negotiated by the Western powers with Germany. However, there was no negotiation and consequently no cooperation. Geographical integration itself was less productive, as Polish politicians simply found it difficult to grasp the Danish security doctrine of supporting disarmament during the interwar period.

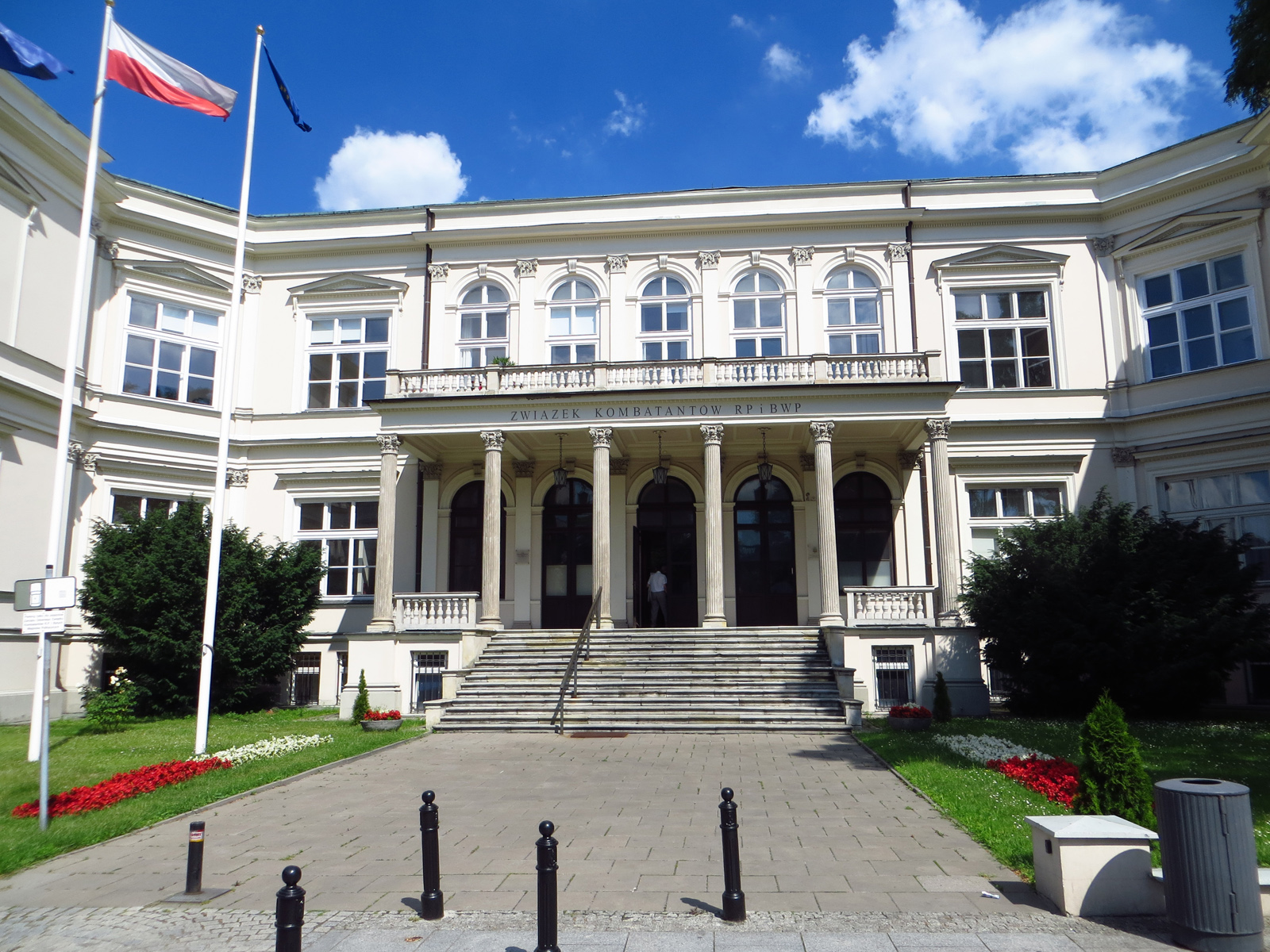
Rembieliński Palace in Warsaw, seat of the Embassy of Denmark in 1923-1928

Honorary vice-consulates of Poland were founded in Aalborg, Aarhus, Hasle in 1921 and in Odense in 1922, and an honorary consular agency Kolding in 1923.

A conciliation and arbitration treaty was signed on 23 April 1926 in Copenhagen. This was followed by a period of systematic contacts aimed at improving mutual familiarity. For example, the fleets of the two countries would make friendly crossings over the Baltic Sea. In 1930, the Danish fleet arrived in Gdynia, while the Polish Dar Pomorza arrived to Denmark in 1933.

Poland generally tried to take a more active role in the Baltic Sea region throughout the 1930s. For this, Denmark was a target of Polish diplomacy because of its advantageous location at the straits that connects the Baltic Sea and the North Sea.

The appointment of Michał Sokolnicki as envoy to Copenhagen in 1931 was one indication of growing Polish interest in Denmark. Sokolnicki was a close friend and associate of Józef Piłsudski during the Polish–Soviet War. In 1934, Polish Foreign Minister Józef Beck visited Copenhagen. However, by the mid-1930s, Danish import of Polish coal decreased due to the end of the coal strike in the United Kingdom.

During the interwar period, Poland had military intelligence people in Denmark who cooperated with their Danish counterparts against Germany.

==== Trade relations ====
A trade and navigation treaty was signed between Denmark and Poland in 1924. After 1926, Poland replaced the United Kingdom as a supplier of coal to Denmark. In 1925, the amount of Polish coal exports was 220,000 tons, 942,000 tons in 1926 and 1.3 million tons in 1927. By 1931, Danish imports from Poland amounted to 2.3% while the Polish import of Danish goods was less than one percent. In 1930, Polish Minister of Industry and Trade Eugeniusz Kwiatkowski visited Denmark to strengthen trade relations.

==== Polish representatives in Denmark ====
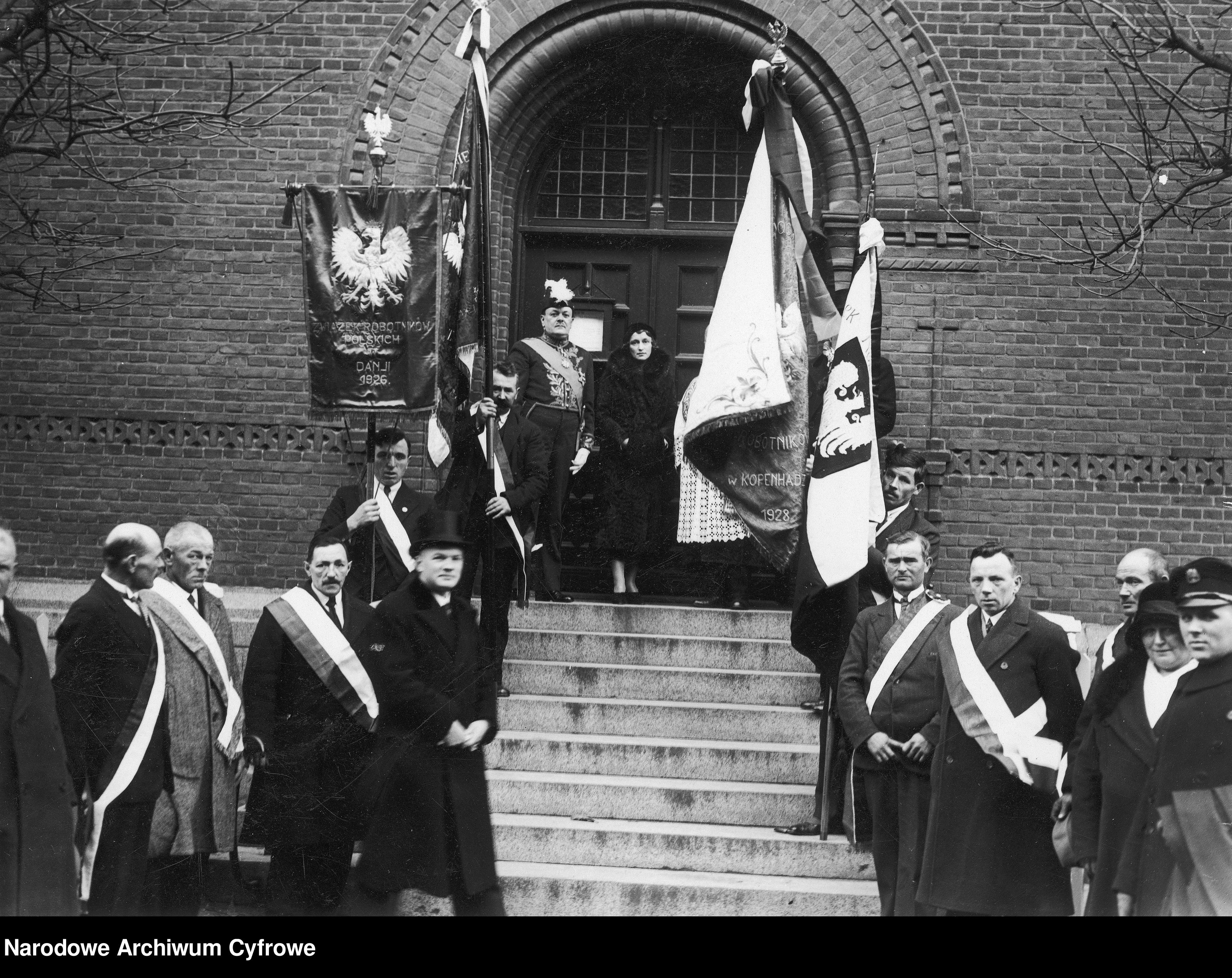
Ambassador Michał Sokolnicki with wife Irena Sokolnicka during Polish National Independence Day celebration in Copenhagen in 1933

List of Polish representatives of the Second Polish Republic to Denmark:

- Aleksander Dzieduszycki (1919–1924)
- Konstanty Rozwadowski (1924–1928)
- Jan Zygmunt Michałowski (1928–1931)
- Michał Sokolnicki (1931–1936)
- Jan Starzewski (1936–1940)
- Seweryn Sokołowski (designated to succeed Starzewski in 1939)

=== World War II ===
During the German-Soviet invasion of Poland, which started World War II in September 1939, Denmark declared neutrality. A majority of Polish diplomatic and consular personnel from Germany were evacuated to Denmark. Józef Lipski, evacuated Polish Ambassador to Berlin, stressed that evacuated Poles received a most hospitable and cordial welcome in Denmark.

In 1940, Denmark became the second country to be invaded by Germany during the war. King Christian X of Denmark obtained an approval from Germany so that the representatives of Poland were able to safely leave Denmark. Polish intelligence officers fled to Sweden for safety. Danish-Polish diplomatic relations were considered legally intact.

During the German occupation of both countries, relations were minimal. A Polish intelligence organization was established in Denmark, which recruited both Danish and Polish citizens. The Polish Home Army co-operated with the vice-consul of Denmark in German-occupied Gdańsk. Both Poles and Danes were among the prisoners of the Nazi German Sonnenburg concentration camp in Słońsk.

In 1944–1945, Poland was occupied by the Soviet Union, which installed a communist regime. In July 1945 Denmark went on to withdraw diplomatic recognition of the Polish government-in-exile in July 1945.

=== Relations during the Cold War (1945–1990) ===
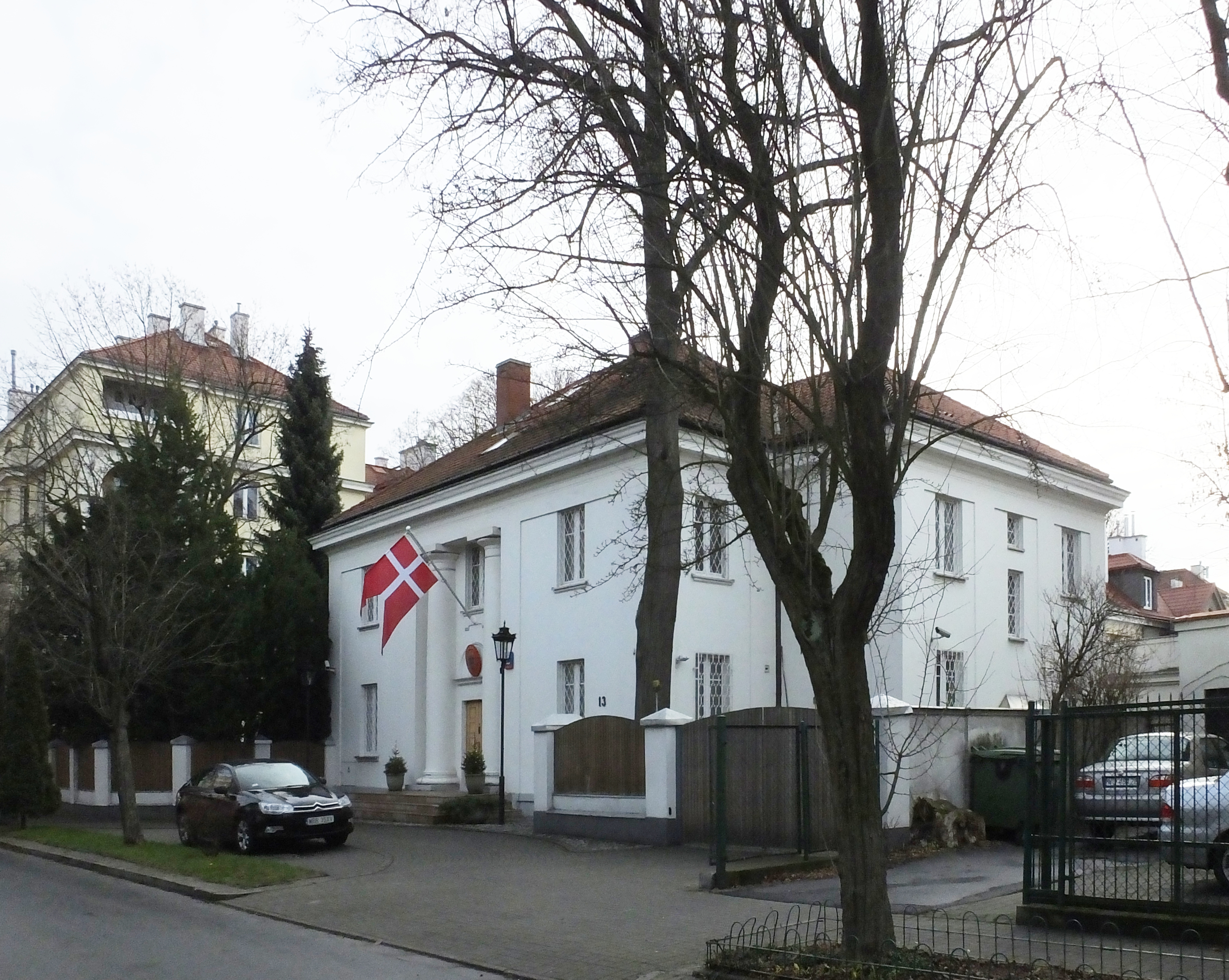
Zakrzewski Villa in Warsaw, seat of the Embassy of Denmark in 1951–1959, and the residence of the Danish Ambassador to Poland in 1964-2019

Denmark recognized the Provisional Government of National Unity in Poland on 7 July 1945 and started sending humanitarian aid to Poland that continued after the Cold War had commenced. The period from 1949 to 1953 was the most disconsolate period in the diplomatic relations between the two countries as Denmark had joined NATO and Poland was directly subordinate to Stalin and the Soviet Union. However, two protocols on the claims and compensation for nationalised Danish property were signed in 1949 and 1953.

After the death of Stalin, Denmark joined the Anglo-American strategy of subtly encouraging satellite nations of the Soviet Union to assert their independence by fostering trade and cultural ties with Western nations. In the 1950s, Danish-Polish relations improved with Poland elevating their representation in Copenhagen to an embassy on 15 August 1957 and appointed Stanisław Wincenty Dobrowolski as ambassador. Conversely, Denmark appointed their first ambassador to Poland in February 1960. In September 1960, Danish Foreign Minister Jens Otto Krag became the first foreign minister from a NATO country to visit a Soviet satellite state, when he visited Poland to meet Foreign Minister Adam Rapacki. During their meetings, they agreed to avoid provocative military acts in the Baltic Sea. They moreover agreed to develop economic and cultural exchange but Denmark refused to include the Rapacki Plan in their joint communique for fear of it being used as propaganda. Denmark did privately raise the proposal to their NATO allies and banned the presence of nuclear weapons on their territory. Foreign Minister Rapacki visited Copenhagen in June 1960 where he was received by King Frederik IX of Denmark and Prime Minister Viggo Kampmann.

A cultural and scientific cooperation treaty was signed between Denmark and Poland on 8 June 1960.

By the 1970s, Poland had become the largest trading partner for Denmark among the communist bloc and they moreover began negotiations on finding a solution on the maritime borders in 1972 which would continue until 2018 when Poland handed Denmark 80% of the disputed area. In the 1980s, communication decreased as Denmark joined other Western countries in pressuring Poland to re-establish dialogue with Solidarność and the Church. Only in 1987, did communication normalize as Polish authorities began political reforms and appeared to decompose.

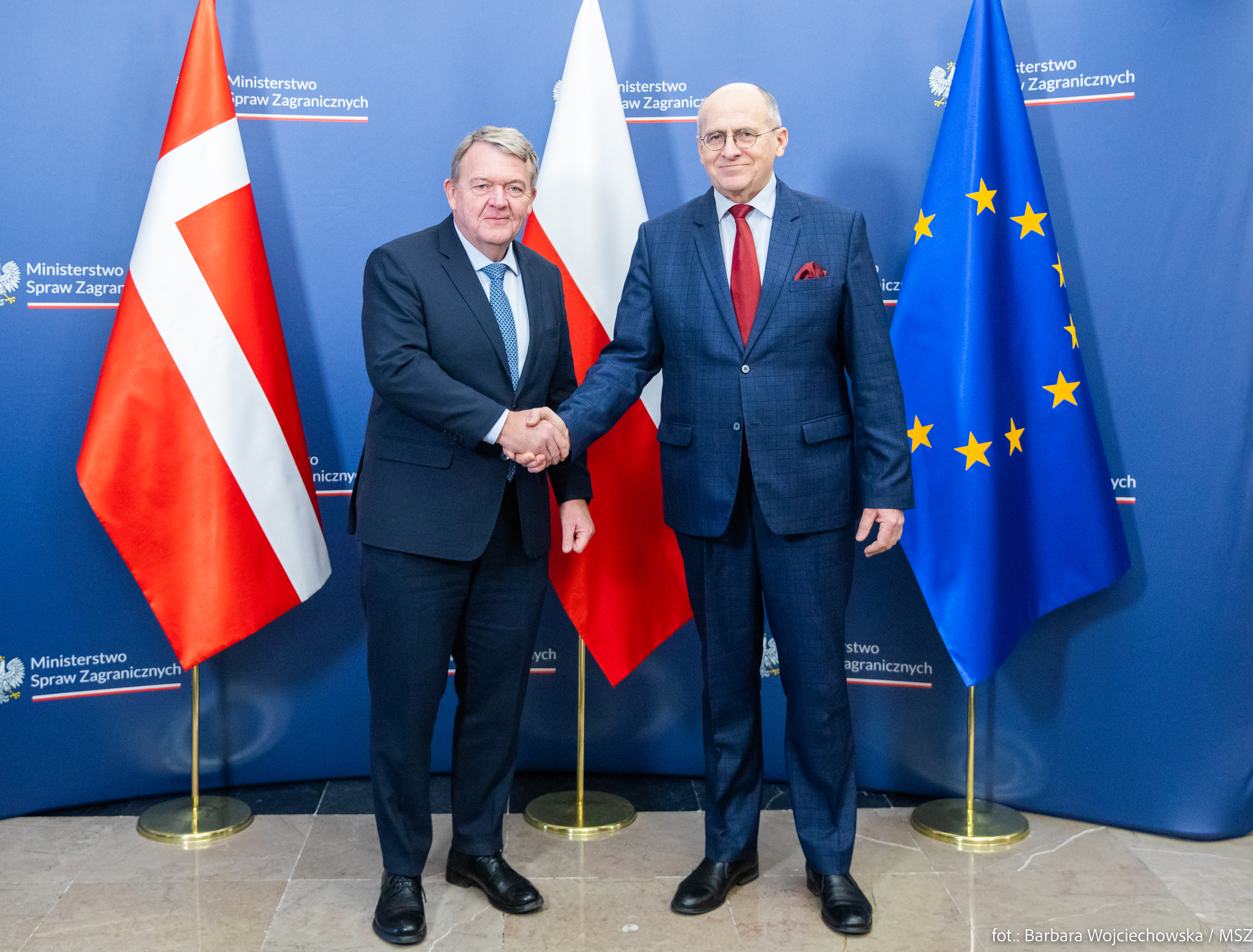
Minister of Foreign Affairs of Denmark Lars Løkke Rasmussen and Minister of Foreign Affairs of Poland Zbigniew Rau in 2023

=== Defense cooperation (1990s) ===
Danish and Polish defense cooperation began in October 1993, when the first bilateral cooperation agreement was signed. The cooperation was further developed in January 1994 with the two countries signing the first annual programme, which would determine the concrete activities which were to be carried out in the year. It was firstly a matter of a number of high-level visits. In September 1994, Denmark took part in the five-day Partnership for Peace military exercise codenamed "Cooperative Bridge 94" in Biedrusko. The two countries moreover joined forces in 1995 during the Bosnian War with the creation of the IFOR Nordic-Polish brigade. For the year 1996, the two countries agreed to organize 64 activities on defense which was an increase from the 30 in 1995. In 1997, the Multinational Corps Northeast was formed to lead to the integration of Poland into NATO which took place 12 March 1999.

=== Environmental assistance (1990s) ===
From 1991 to 2000, Denmark was one of the largest contributors to the Polish environmental sector comprising more than 35 per cent of the total bilateral assistance to the country. During this period, Denmark supported 232 projects in Poland amounting to 635 million DKK or 73 million USD.

== Trade ==
The following table shows the annual trade numbers between the two countries from 1988 to 2022 in euro:

Year	Polish imports to Denmark	Danish imports to Poland
1988	€203.16 million	€95.17 million
1989	€205.43 million	€156.43 million
1990	€277.88 million	€201.78 million
1991	€331.32 million	€520.25 million
1992	€355.83 million	€398.44 million
1993	€385.41 million	€389.11 million
1994	€502.82 million	€452.1 million
1995	€549.27 million	€480.14 million
1996	€550.44 million	€620.36 million
1997	€656.39 million	€698.87 million
1998	€694.05 million	€755.29 million
1999	€743.49 million	€734.92 million
2000	€873.42 million	€796.12 million
2001	€1019.64 million	€850.66 million
2002	€981.49 million	€856.45 million
2003	€883.17 million	€812.68 million
2004	€991.9 million	€849.71 million
2005	€1167.79 million	€1063.3 million
2006	€1556.22 million	€1288.83 million
2007	€1718.52 million	€1559.06 million
2008	€2012.81 million	€1748.56 million
2009	€1501.41 million	€1454.68 million
2010	€1859.08 million	€1600.45 million
2011	€2124.34 million	€1905.03 million
2012	€2244.04 million	€1853.19 million
2013	€2421.24 million	€1909.44 million
2014	€2414.35 million	€2064.78 million
2015	€2603.55 million	€2325.2 million
2016	€2952.44 million	€2301.87 million
2017	€3249.33 million	€2484.52 million
2018	€3394.93 million	€2536 million
2019	€3634.96 million	€3005.81 million
2020	€3911.15 million	€3243.49 million
2021	€4535.2 million	€3571.41 million

== Maritime borders ==
In 2018, Denmark and Poland ended 40 years of maritime border dispute when they signed an agreement concerning 3,600 km^{2} (1,400 sq mi) of Baltic Sea between Bornholm and Poland, with Denmark receiving 80% of the area. This paved the way for the Baltic Pipe, connecting Norway with Denmark and Poland, which was commissioned in September 2022.

== Resident diplomatic missions ==
- Denmark has an embassy in Warsaw.
- Poland has an embassy in Copenhagen.
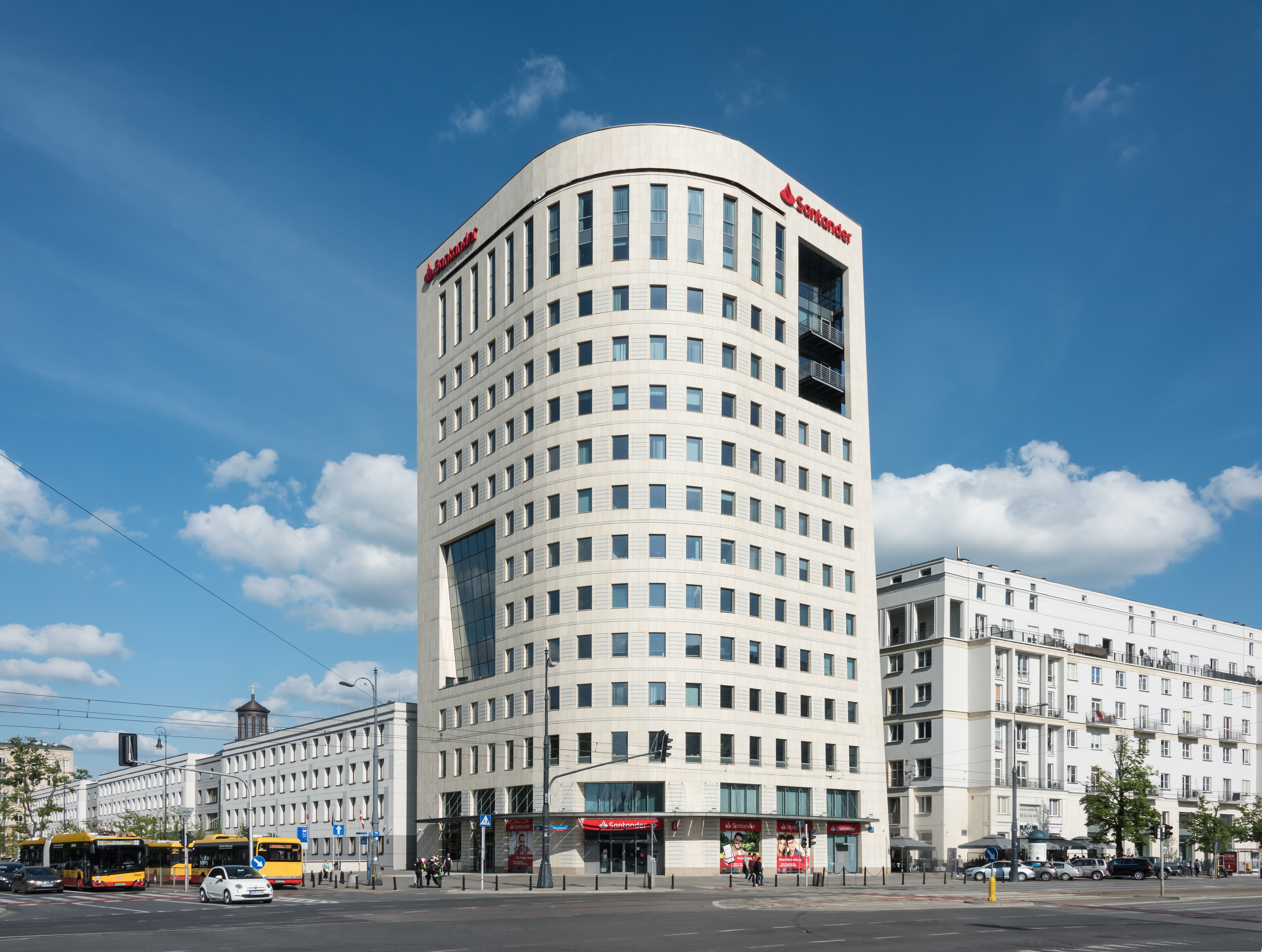
Building hosting the Embassy of Denmark in Warsaw

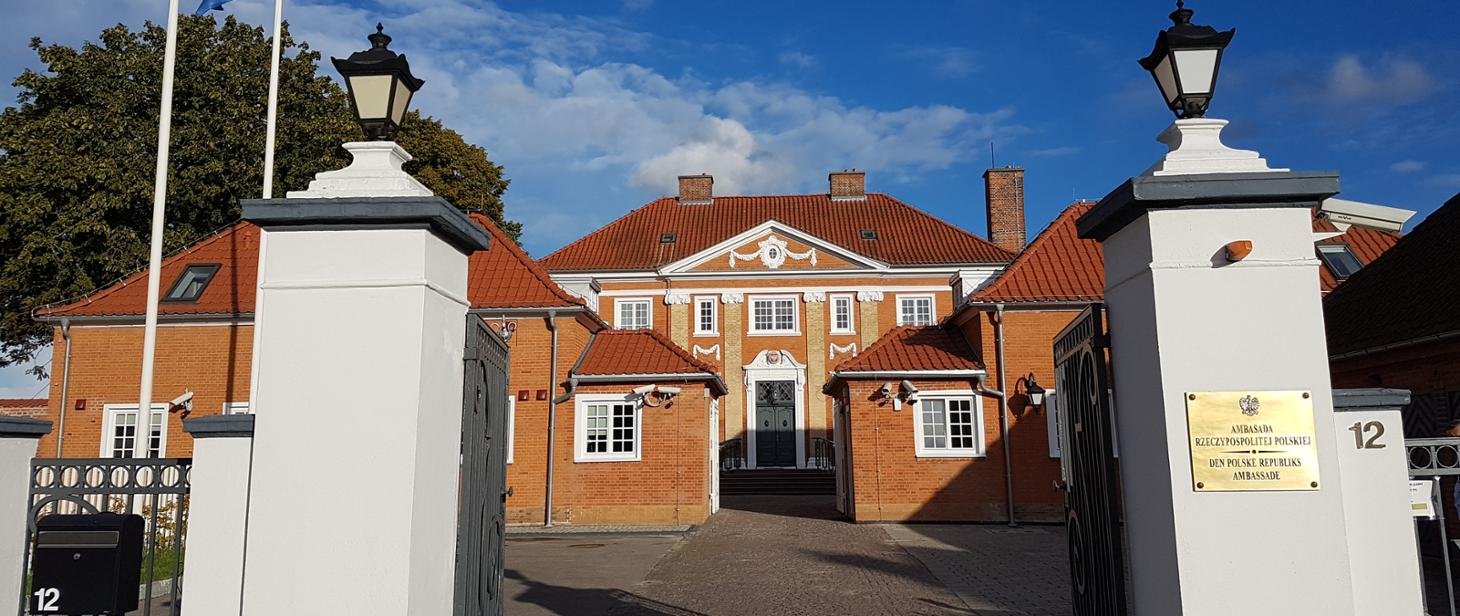
Embassy of Poland in Copenhagen

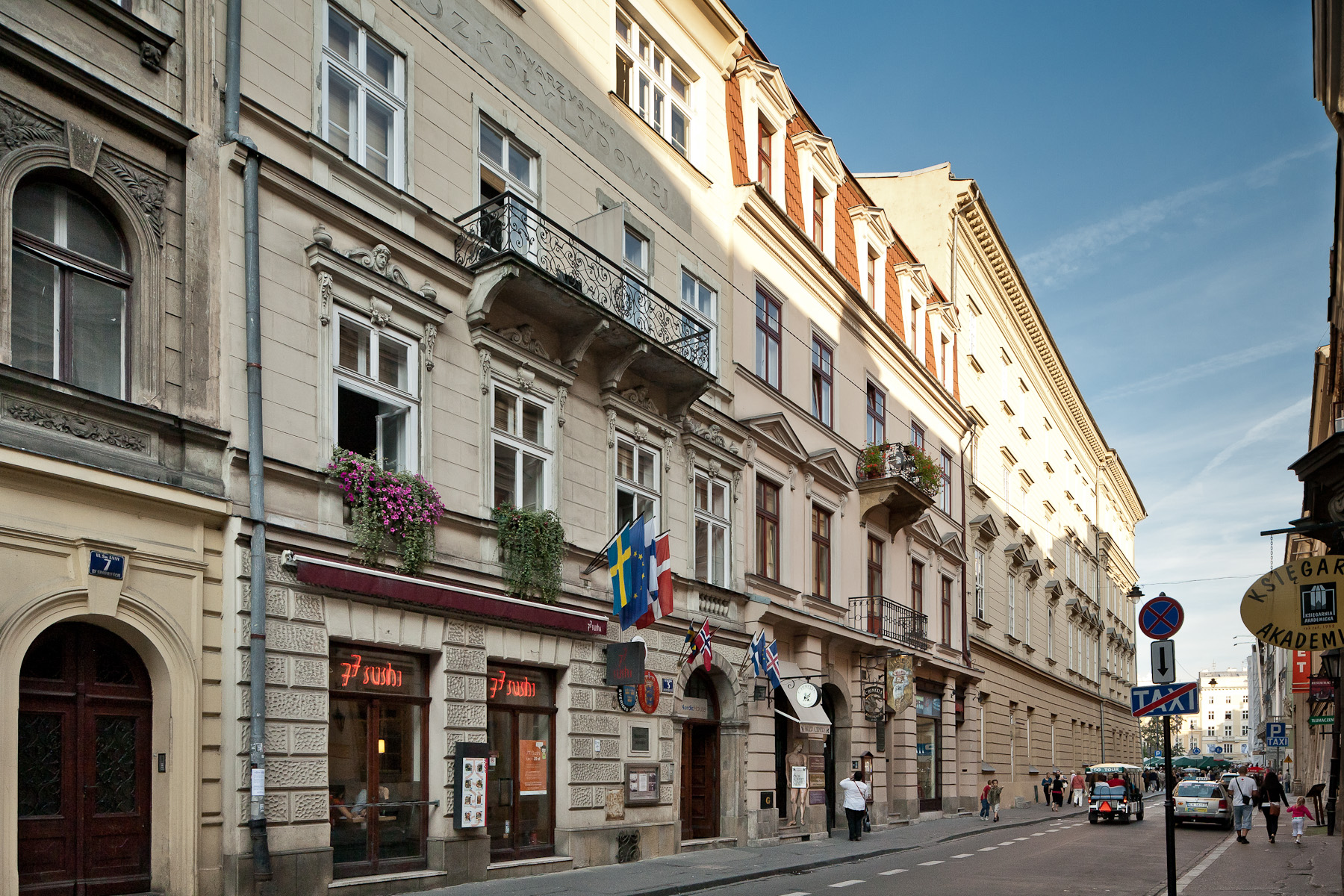
Honorary Consulate of Denmark in Kraków

== See also ==
- Foreign relations of Denmark
- Foreign relations of Poland
- Languages of Denmark#Polish
- Franciszek Jarecki - Polish pilot who fled to Denmark on 5 March 1953 with his MiG-15bis aircraft.
- Poles in Denmark

== Bibliography ==
- Nowodworski, Witold (1911a). "Stosunki Rzeczypospolitej ze Szwecyą i Danią za Batorego". Przegląd Historyczny (in Polish). 12 (1).
- Nowodworski, Witold (1911b). "Stosunki Rzeczypospolitej ze Szwecyą i Danią za Batorego (Ciąg dalszy)". Przegląd Historyczny (in Polish). 12 (2).
