= List of ambassadors of Poland to Latvia =

Poland Ambassador to Latvia
- Ambasador Rzeczypospolitej Polskiej na Łotwie
- Coat of arms of Poland
- Reports to: Polish Ministry of Foreign Affairs
- Seat: Riga, Latvia
- Appointer: President of Poland
- Term length: No fixed term
- Website: Embassy of Poland, Latvia

The Republic of Poland Ambassador to Latvia is the leader of the Poland delegation, Poland Mission to Latvia.

As with all Poland Ambassadors, the ambassador to Latvia is nominated by the Poland's Minister of Foreign Affairs and confirmed by the Parliamentary Commission of the Foreign Affairs. The ambassador is appointed by the President of Poland who is obligated to accept the ambassador's nomination unconditionally, in accordance with the Constitution of the Republic of Poland. The Ambassador enjoys full diplomatic immunity.

Poland Embassy in Latvia is located in Riga.

== History ==
Poland recognised independence of Latvia on January 27, 1921. In 1939, diplomatic relations between Poland and Latvia were dissolved because of the Soviet-German Molotov–Ribbentrop Pact, which expropriated among others Poland and Latvia. Between 1939 and 1991 there were no official relations between Polish People's Republic led by communists and Latvian Soviet Socialist Republic which was a part of the Soviet Union. In 1991 diplomatic relations between Poland and Latvia were restored.

== List of ambassadors of Poland to Latvia ==
=== Second Polish Republic ===
- 1919–1920: Bronisław Bouffałł (delegate of the mission)
- 1920–1921: Witold Kamieniecki (envoy)
- 1921–1923: Witold Jodko-Narkiewicz (envoy)
- 1923–1926: Aleksander Ładoś (envoy)
- 1926–1929: Juliusz Łukasiewicz (envoy)
- 1929–1932: Mirosław Arciszewski (envoy)
- 1933–1935: Zygmunt Beczkowicz (envoy)
- 1936–1938: Franciszek Charwat (envoy)
- 1938–1939: Jerzy Tadeusz Kłopotowski (chargé d’affaires)

=== Third Polish Republic ===
- 1991–1997: Jarosław Lindenberg
- 1997–2001: Jarosław Bratkiewicz
- 2001–2005: Tadeusz Fiszbach
- 2005–2009: Maciej Klimczak
- 2010–2014: Jerzy Marek Nowakowski
- 2015–2017: Ewa Dębska
- 2017–2018: Ewelina Brudnicka (chargé d’affaires)
- 2018–2024: Monika Michaliszyn
- since 2025: Tomasz Szeratics (chargé d’affaires)
