= Henryka Mościcka-Dendys =

Polish diplomat (born 1976)

Henryka Mościcka-Dendys PhD
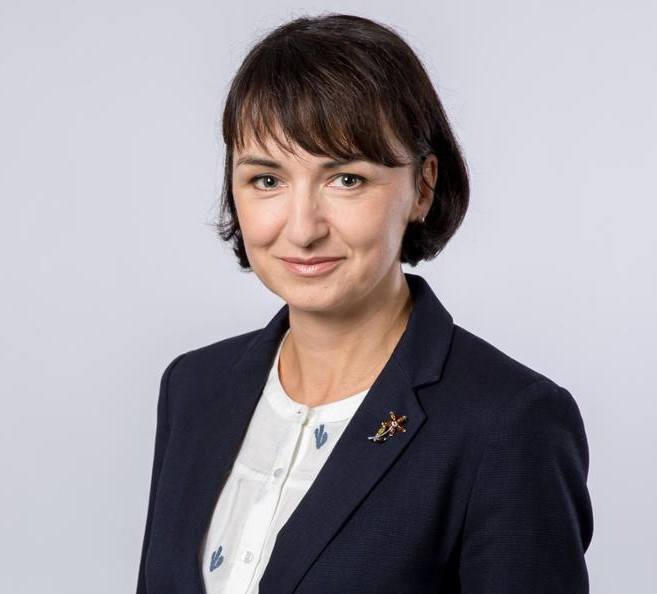

Poland Ambassador to Denmark
- In office 8 November 2015 – 15 September 2020
- Preceded by: Rafał Wiśniewski
- Succeeded by: Antoni Fałkowski

Personal details
- Born: 3 July 1976 (age 50) Kędzierzyn-Koźle
- Education: University of Silesia in Katowice
- Profession: diplomat
- Website: Twitter profile

Henryka Joanna Mościcka-Dendys (born 3 July 1976, Kędzierzyn-Koźle) is a Polish diplomat who served an ambassador of Poland to Denmark (2015–2020).

== Life ==
Henryka Mościcka-Dendys has graduated from the law and classics at the University of Silesia in Katowice. Since 2007 she holds a PhD in international law from the University of Warsaw. Her thesis was on Common Foreign and Security Policy of the European Union.

In 2002 she began her diplomatic career at the Ministry of Foreign Affairs. In 2003 she got seconded to the office of the Council of the Baltic Sea States Commissioner for Democratic Development in Copenhagen. Between 2007 and 2011 she was working at the Poland embassy in Berlin where she was covering EU policies, especially enlargement and institutional issues (2007–2011). Later, in 2011, she was the deputy director of the European Policy Department responsible for institutional affairs and Northern Europe and, since 2012, the director of that department.

On 16 April 2013 she was appointed Undersecretary of State at the MFA. Among her scope of responsibility were European policy, human rights and parliamentary affairs. On 8 November 2015 she started her service as an ambassador to Denmark, presenting her credentials to the queen Margrethe II of Denmark five days later. She ended her term on 15 September 2020. Week later, she became director of the MFA Bureau of Investments. In January 2024, she was nominated Undersecretary of State at the MFA for the second time.

She was member of the Council of the Foundation for Polish-German Cooperation between 2011 and 2016.

She speaks German, English, Russian, and Danish. She is married.

== Honours ==
- Gold Cross of Merit (Poland, 2013)
- Order of the Cross of Terra Mariana, 2nd Class (Estonia, 2014)
- Grand Cross of the Order of Merit of the Republic of Italy (2014)
- Commander of the Order of the Dannebrog (Denmark, 2020)
- Bene Merito honorary badge (Poland, 2021)
- Knight's Cross of the Order of Polonia Restituta (Poland, 2022)
