= Ewa Dębska =

Polish diplomat

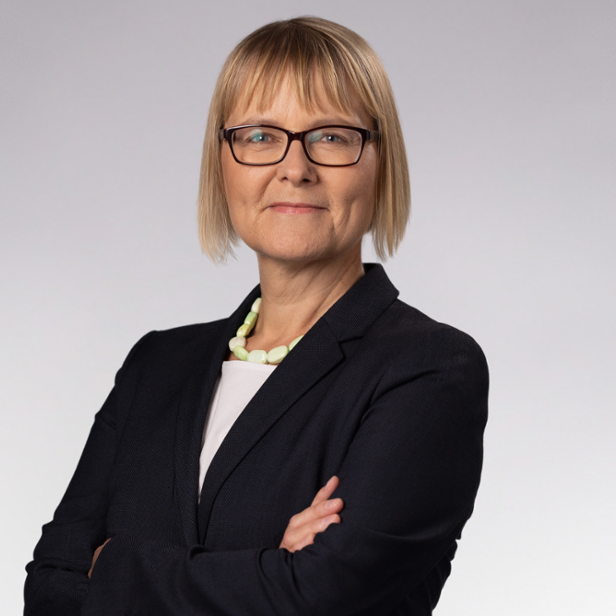
- Dębska in 2024

Poland Ambassador to Latvia
- In office 2015–2017
- Appointed by: Bronisław Komorowski
- President: Andris Bērziņš; Raimonds Vējonis
- Preceded by: Jerzy Marek Nowakowski
- Succeeded by: Monika Michaliszyn

Personal details
- Born: 21 May 1967 (age 59) Poznań, Poland
- Education: Adam Mickiewicz University in Poznań
- Profession: Diplomat

Ewa Dębska (born 21 May 1967 in Poznań, Poland) is a Polish diplomat, between 2015 and 2017 served as a Poland ambassador to Latvia.

== Life ==
Dębska graduated from Scandinavian studies at the Adam Mickiewicz University in Poznań (1991). She completed there also postgraduate studies on Europe and European integration (1997/98).

From 1991 to 1999, she worked as translator and interpreter from Danish language. At that time she cooperated, among others, with the University of Gdańsk (1995–1996), the Danish Embassy in Warsaw, the Danish Cultural Institute in Gdańsk. In 1999, she started her diplomatic career at the political section of the Embassy of Poland in Copenhagen. From 2004 to 2006, she worked at the European Union Department of the Ministry of Foreign Affairs, being in charge of, among others, relation with the Nordic and Baltic states. Between 2008 and 2013 she was Deputy Head of Mission and head of the Political and Economic Section at the Embassy of Poland in Stockholm. In 2013 she became deputy director at the MFA European Policy Department, being responsible for cooperation with the Nordic and Baltic countries and the Visegrád Group. Between March 2015 and 20 December 2017, she served as the ambassador to Latvia. Following her return to MFA in Warsaw, she worked at the Development Cooperation Department and at the European Policy Department. She was appointed the National Coordinator of the EU Strategy for the Baltic Sea Region and the representative of Poland to the Committee of Senior Officials of the Council of the Baltic Sea States. In December 2023, she became the MFA European Policy Department deputy director for relations with countries in Northern and the Mediterranean Europe. She ended her post in August 2024. On 4 October 2024, she became chargé d'affaires a.i. of Poland to the Kingdom of Denmark.

Besides her native Polish, she speaks English, German, Danish, and Swedish languages.

== Honours ==
- Order of the Cross of Terra Mariana, 3rd Class, Estonia, 2014
- Gold Cross of Merit, Poland, 2014
