= Warsaw University of Life Sciences =

Largest agricultural university in Poland, founded in 1816

Coordinates: 52°9′42″N 21°2′53″E

Warsaw University of Life Sciences – SGGW (WULS-SGGW)
- Szkoła Główna Gospodarstwa Wiejskiego (SGGW)
- Type: Public
- Established: September 23, 1816; 209 years ago
- Affiliations: Leonardo Da Vinci, SOCRATES, BUDDY, CEEPUS, ARENA, PHARE-SCI-TECH, PHARE-ACE, SENECA, COST, JEAN MONET, FAIR, TEMPUS
- Rector: Prof. dr. hab. Michał Zasada
- Administrative staff: 2,685 (2017)
- Students: 15,254 (12.2023)
- Location: Nowoursynowska 166, 02-787, Warsaw, Poland
- Campus: Urban
- Website: www.sggw.pl

University rankings

Regional – Overall
- QS Emerging Europe and Central Asia: 91 (2022)

The Warsaw University of Life Sciences (Polish: Szkoła Główna Gospodarstwa Wiejskiego, lit. 'Main School of Rural Homestead', SGGW) is the largest agricultural university in Poland, established in 1816 in Warsaw. It employs over 2,600 staff including over 1,200 academic educators. The University is since 2005 a member of the Euroleague for Life Sciences (ELLS) which was established in 2001. The SGGW offers some 37 different fields of study, 13 faculties in Agricultural Sciences, Economic Sciences, Humanities, Technical as well as Life Sciences. Its Agriculture and Forestry and Veterinary Medicine have been ranked as top 41 and 51-70 in the world on QS top university ranking 2023.

== History ==
On 23 September 1816 the School of Agronomy was founded at Marymont and was accommodated in the palace of Marie Casimire Louise de La Grange d'Arquien. Branches were established at Bielany, Ruda, Wawrzyszew and Buraków. An Institute of Veterinary Medicine was established at Rządowa, followed by the Institute of Rural Economy and Forestry in 1840. As Poland was ruled by the Tsar of Russia there were attempts at Russification which nearly resulted in the closure of the school, but it was transferred first to Puławy and later to Russia. After the independence of Poland in 1918 the Institute was returned to Warsaw and became the Major School of Rural Economy in 1919. Horticultural studies were added to those of agriculture and forestry in 1921. Activity was disrupted by the Second World War and resumed in 1945. The veterinary faculty was transferred from the University of Warsaw in 1952, and later the departments of agricultural drainage, wood technology, animal husbandry, and of landscape, now known as the Landscape Architecture Section, were established. Land and farms at Wolica and Natolin were acquired in 1956 and used for development. In 1973 the faculties of agricultural technology and human nutrition were established. The Rector of the university has an office in the historic palace of Julian Ursyn Niemcewicz, now known as "the rector's palace."

== Campus ==
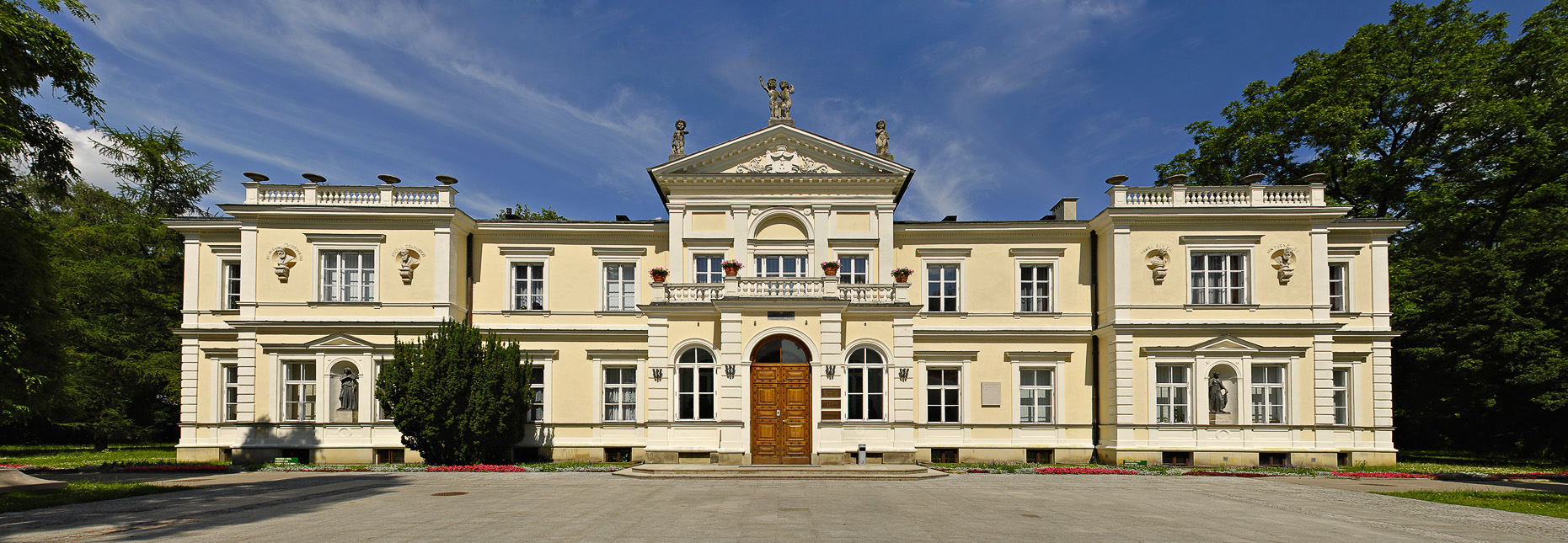
Rectorate of SGGW in the Palace of Krasiński

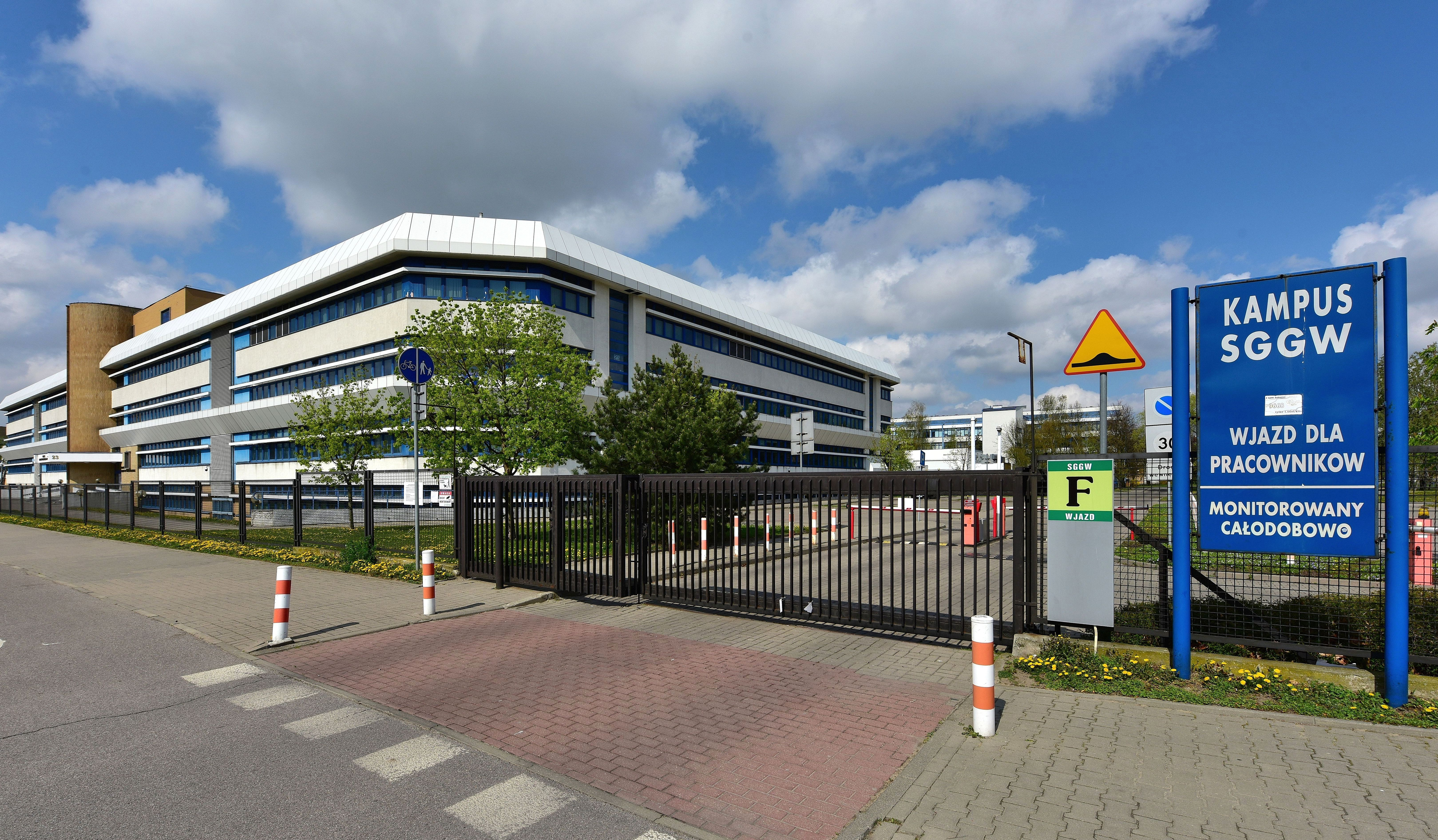
University campus

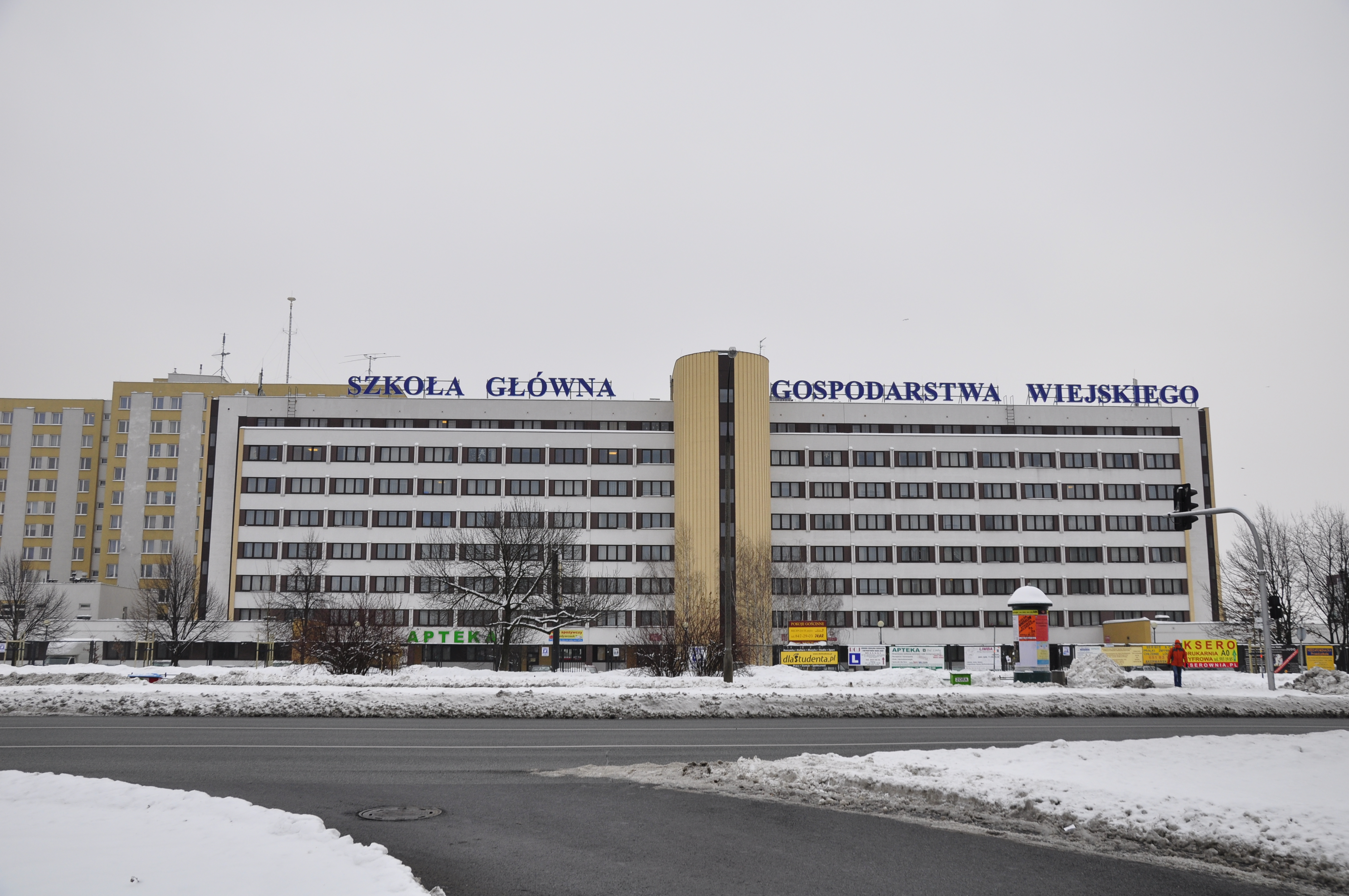
Limba Dormitory

The campus is located is the southernmost district of Warsaw, Ursynów. The campus has a historic part, with an 18th-century palace, and a contemporary part where most of the faculty buildings and dormitories are situated. On 70-hectare main campus are located 12 dormitories, a modern library, a sports centre (with tennis courts, a sports hall and a swimming pool) a foreign languages centre, a veterinary clinic.

== Faculties ==
1. Agriculture and Ecology
2. Animal Breeding, Bioengineering and Conservation
3. Applied Informatics and Mathematics
4. Biology and Biotechnology
5. Civil and Environmental Engineering
6. Economics
7. Food Technology
8. Forestry
9. Horticulture
10. Human Nutrition
11. Sociology and Education
12. Production Engineering
13. Wood Technology
14. Veterinary Medicine

== Notable staff ==
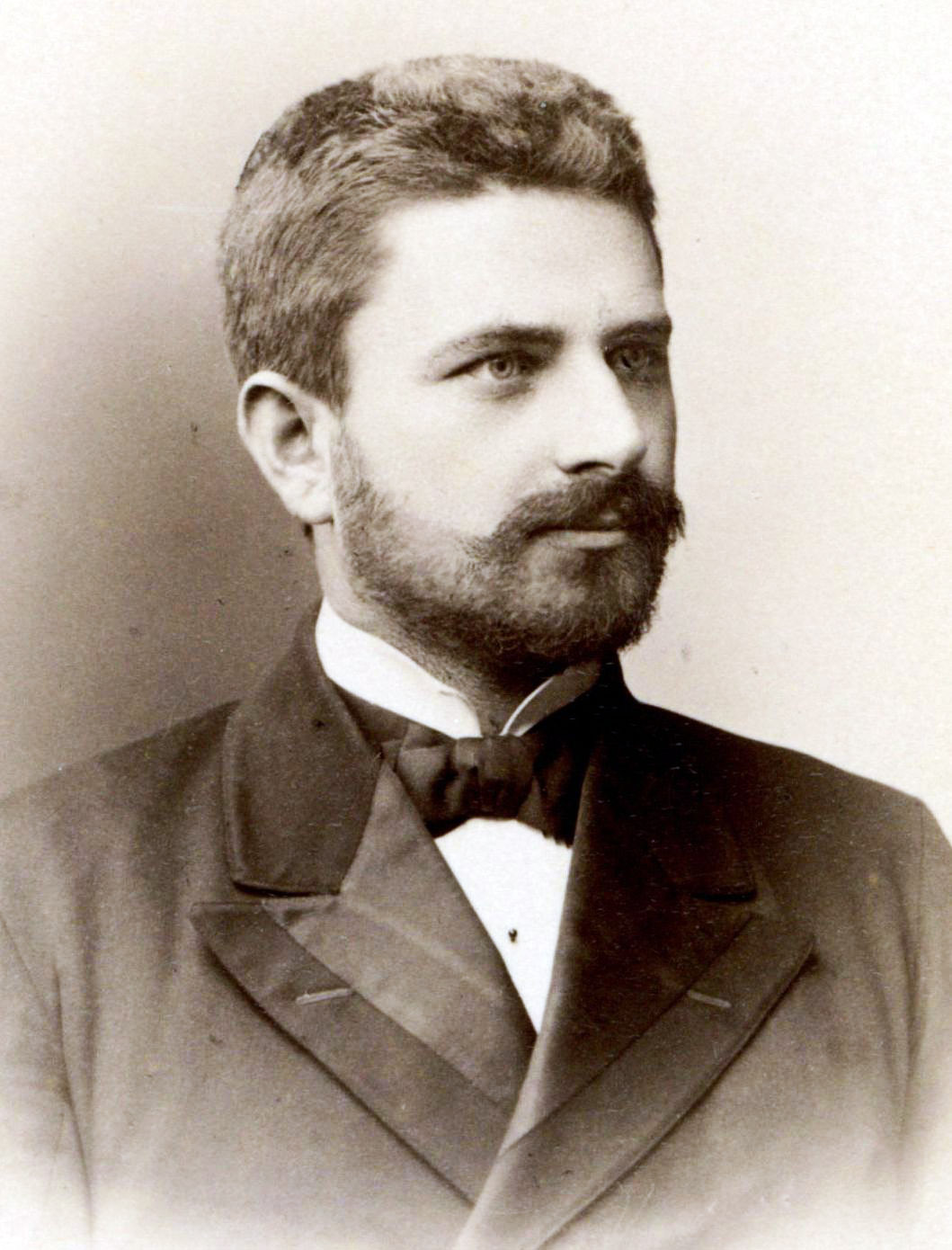
Józef Mikułowski-Pomorski

- Józef Mikułowski-Pomorski (1868–1935), politician, agricultural chemist; Minister of Religious and Public Enlightenment 1922–1923, 1926

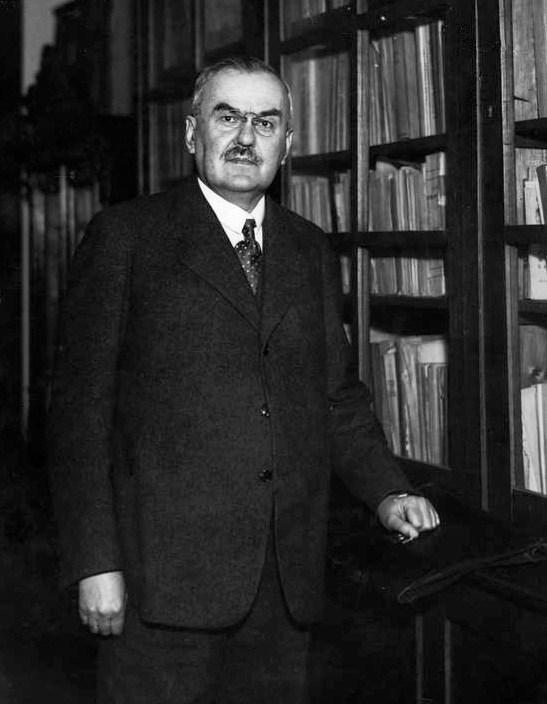
Władysław Grabski

- Władysław Grabski (1874–1938), politician, economist and historian; Prime Minister of Poland 1923–1925; founder of the Bank of Poland and the Polish currency
- Stefan Ignar (1908–1992), politician, economist, Deputy Prime Minister of the Republic of Poland 1956–1969

=== Rectors ===
1. Józef Mikułowski-Pomorski (1918–1920)
2. Tadeusz Miłobędzki (1920–1921)
3. Stefan Biedrzycki (1921–1922)
4. Wacław Dąbrowski (1922–1923)
5. Jan Sosnowski (1923–1925)
6. Zdzisław Ludkiewicz (1925–1926)
7. Władysław Grabski (1926–1928)
8. Józef Mikułowski-Pomorski (1928–1929)
9. Stefan Biedrzycki (1929–1932)
10. Jan Sosnowski (1932–1933)
11. Marian Górski (1933–1936)
12. Jan Miklaszewski (1936–1944)
13. Franciszek Staff (1944–1947)
14. Marian Górski (1947–1949)
15. Antoni Kleszczycki (1949–1955)
16. Kazimierz Krysiak (1955–1962)
17. Antoni Kleszczycki (1962–1969)
18. Zbigniew Muszyński (1969–1975)
19. Henryk Jasiorowski (1975–1981)
20. Maria Joanna Radomska (1981–1987)
21. Wiesław Barej (1987–1990)
22. Jan Górecki (1990–1996)
23. Włodzimierz Kluciński (1996–2002)
24. Tomasz Borecki (2002–2008)
25. Alojzy Szymański (2008–2016)
26. Wiesław Bielawski (2016–2020)
27. Michał Zasada (since 2020)

== See also ==
- List of forestry universities and colleges
